= Lebanon station =

Lebanon station may refer to:

- Lebanon station (Tennessee) a Music City Star train station in Lebanon, Tennessee
- Lebanon station (NJ Transit), a New Jersey Transit station in Lebanon, New Jersey
- Lebanon station (Pennsylvania Railroad), a former Pennsylvania Railroad train station in Lebanon, Pennsylvania
- Lebanon station (Reading Railroad), a former Reading Railroad station in Lebanon, Pennsylvania
- Mt. Lebanon station, a Pittsburgh Light Rail station in Mt. Lebanon, Pennsylvania
