= Cornwall Railroad =

Railway company in Pennsylvania

Overview
- Dates of operation: 1850–1968
- Successor: Reading Company

Technical
- Length: 11.5 miles (18.5 km)

The Cornwall Railroad, formerly the North Lebanon Railroad, was a railway company in the state of Pennsylvania. It was incorporated in 1850 and opened its initial line between Lebanon and Cornwall, Pennsylvania, in 1855. The Reading Company bought the Cornwall Railroad in 1968. The line passed to Conrail on the Reading's bankruptcy in 1976 and has since been abandoned. The line ran parallel to that of the Cornwall and Lebanon Railroad, later part of the Pennsylvania Railroad system.

== History ==
The company was incorporated as the North Lebanon Railroad on May 25, 1850. The backers of the new railroad planned to ship iron ore from mines around Cornwall to Lebanon, where a connection was available with the Union Canal. The 6-mile (9.7 km) line opened in 1854. At the same time, the Lebanon Valley Railroad was building what would become the Lebanon Valley Branch of the Reading Company between Reading and Harrisburg. The line opened between Reading and Lebanon in 1857 and between Lebanon and Harrisburg in 1858.

The company's name changed to the Cornwall Railroad on April 5, 1870. The Cornwall and Lebanon Railroad, whose line between the two namesake cities ran parallel (to the east) to that of the Cornwall Railroad, opened in 1883. The Cornwall Railroad acquired the Cornwall and Mount Hope Railroad in 1886, extending its line another 5 miles (8.0 km) to Mount Hope, Pennsylvania, where it interchanged with the Reading and Columbia Railroad.

Cornwall Railroad passenger trains used the Reading station in Lebanon until the end of passenger service on January 29, 1929. Bethlehem Steel bought the railroad on December 1, 1923. The Reading Company leased the line from Bethlehem Steel in 1964. At the same time, the line between Cornwall and Mount Hope was abandoned. The Reading bought the company outright in 1968. The Reading designated the line the Cornwall Branch, and it was conveyed to Conrail in 1976. R.J. Corman Railroad Group acquired the remaining portion of the branch in 1997. R. J. Corman abandoned the line in the 2000s. Much of the right-of-way is now the north end of the Lebanon Valley Rail Trail.
