= Mount Gretna Narrow Gauge Railway =

Narrow-gauge railway in Pennsylvania

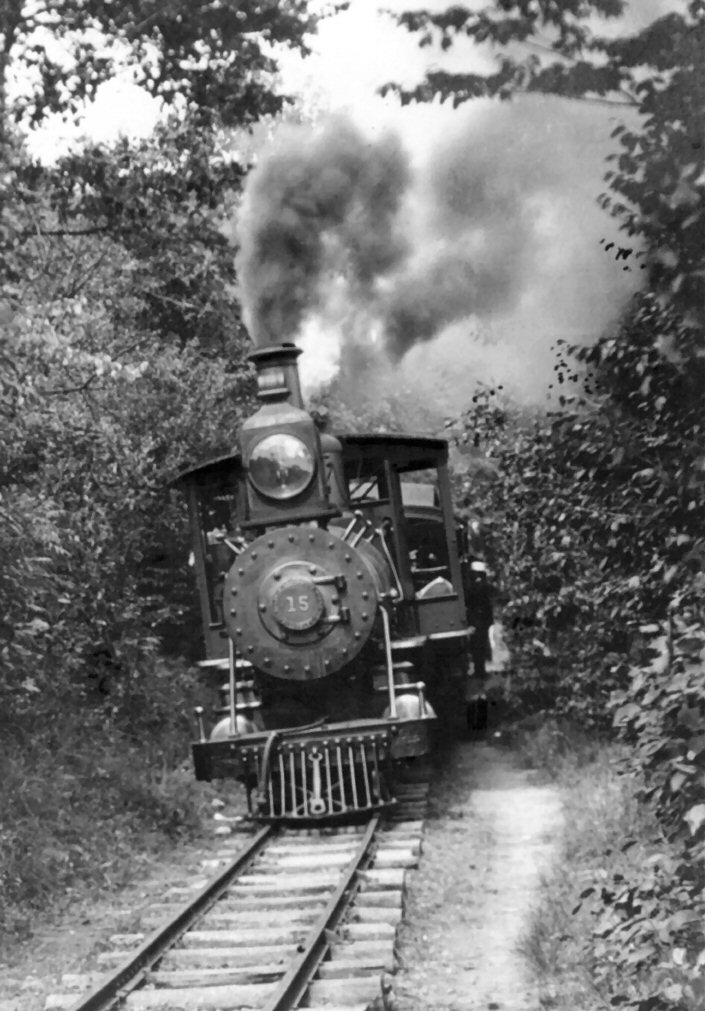
One of the 2 ft (610 mm) gauge 4-4-0 locomotives of the Mount Gretna Narrow Gauge Railway.

The Mount Gretna Narrow Gauge Railway was a 2 ft (610 mm) narrow-gauge line of the Cornwall and Lebanon Railroad in the state of Pennsylvania that operated between 1889 and 1915 under the parent Cornwall and Lebanon Railroad Company. The C&L Railroad earlier had established a station and picnic ground at Mount Gretna.

== History ==
The Gilded Age iron industrialist and railroad president Robert Habersham Coleman decided that a 4-mile (6-kilometer) narrow-gauge railroad to the top of nearby Governor Dick Mountain would provide an additional tourist draw, and a 0.6-mile (1-kilometer) spur at milepost 0.75 could service the Pennsylvania National Guard rifle ranges nearby. The line was built to the rare (in North America) and very narrow gauge of 24 inches (610 mm). Locomotives, apart from an early and unsuccessful H. K. Porter, Inc 0-4-4T Forney locomotive numbered 11 (first 11), were three 4-4-0 "American" types (#12, #11 (second 11), and #15 built in that order) built by Baldwin Locomotive Works. Baldwin locomotive #11 was ordered on 22 June 1889 and built in only 8 days to be ready for anticipated Independence Day crowds after the Porter Forney wheelbase proved too rigid for reliable service on small-radius curves. The Baldwin locomotives featured lagged smokeboxes and were the only 2 ft (610 mm) gauge 4-4-0s ever operated in North America (discounting Crown Metal Products locomotives); although Baldwin built a 600 mm (1 ft 11 5/8 in) gauge 4-4-0 for the Ferrocarril de Tacubaya of Mexico City in 1897.

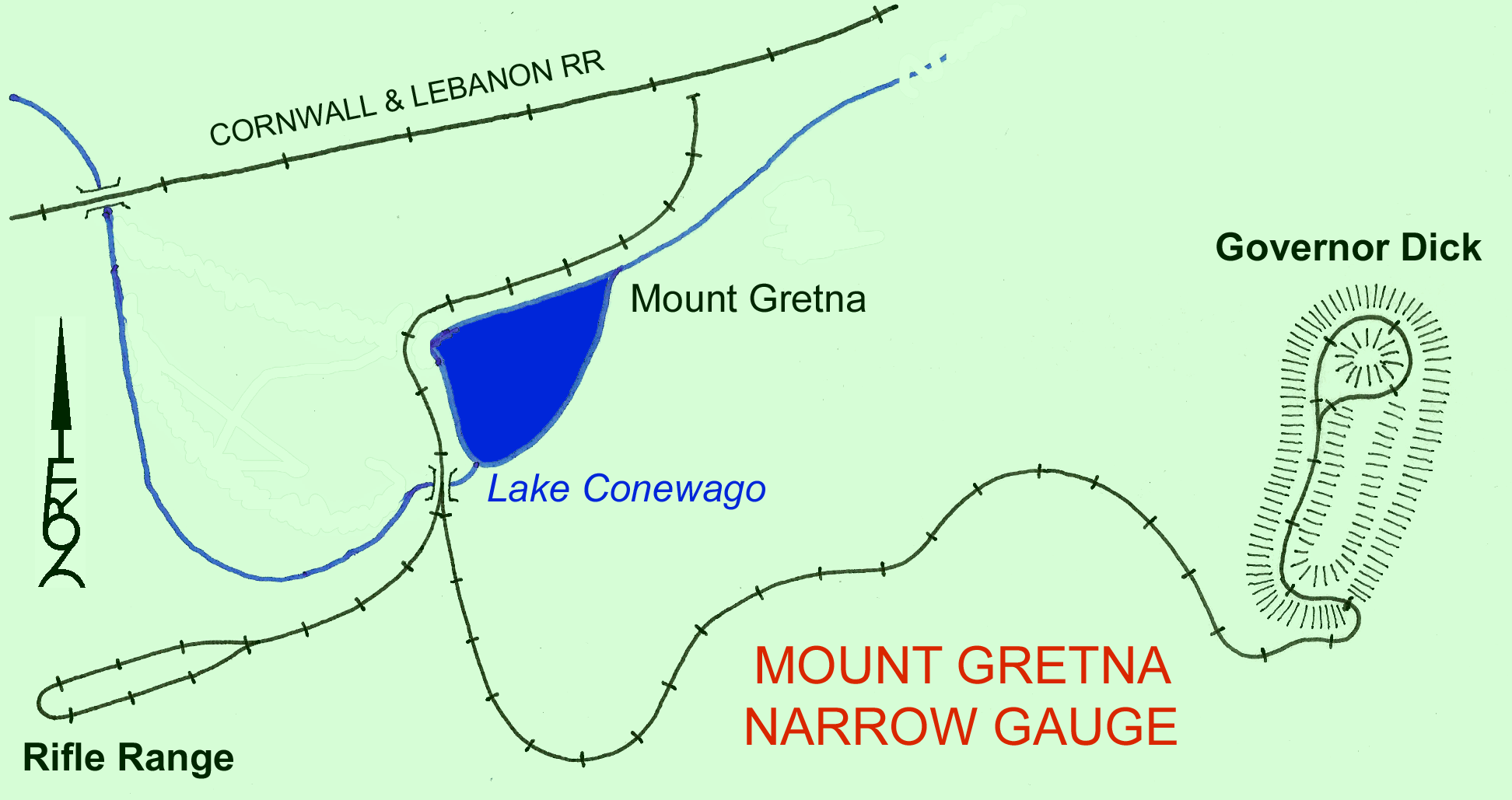
Map of the Mt Gretna Narrow Gauge Railway

Rails weighing 30 pounds per yard (10 kg/m) were spiked onto the 4-inch (10 cm) face of ties 3 feet (0.9 m) long. A turntable, engine-house, water tank, and storage tracks were near the junction with the Cornwall & Lebanon at Mount Gretna. Return loops were built near the rifle range and around Governor Dick peak. During the summer of 1889 passengers were carried in one conventional coach and 7 open-sided observation cars boarded from long foot-boards running along the length of either side of the car, though typically trains consisted of only one to three coaches. These eight passenger cars were built by the Jackson & Sharp Company. Two more observation cars were added when locomotive #15 was purchased for the summer of 1890. At first the railroad was popular, but the tourist trade declined after the novelty had died down. The loop around Governor Dick was dismantled after the summer of 1896, but the railroad continued operation for the National Guard rifle range. A serious accident on the 11th of July, 1915 killed off that traffic. One of the observation cars overturned on a sharp curve when a large number of guardsmen attempted to board simultaneously from one side of the car. There were some serious injuries, and the tiny railroad ceased operation in the summer of 1916, shortly after its parent company's purchase by the Pennsylvania Railroad. Most sources state that the narrow-gauge equipment was loaded aboard standard gauge cars on 14 September 1916. However, a newspaper clipping dating from the 24th of December, 1920 mentions the departure of "two miniature steam locomotives" with reference to the narrow gauge railroad. This clipping is backed up by numerous other reports from around that same time.

=== Locomotives ===
Number	Builder	Type	Built	Retired	Disposition
11	H.K.Porter Company	0-4-4t Forney	1889	Mid 1890s	Converted to standard gauge for use on the Cornwall & Lebanon and later scrapped after operations at the associated Cornwall Anthracite Furnaces ceased.
12	Baldwin Locomotive Works	4-4-0	1889	1916	Scrapped
11	Baldwin Locomotive Works	4-4-0	1889	1916	Scrapped
15	Baldwin Locomotive Works	4-4-0	1890	1916	Scrapped

== Cornwall and Lebanon Railroad ==
The standard-gauge Cornwall and Lebanon Railroad continued operations as a branch of the Pennsylvania Railroad, and later Penn Central Transportation Company until 1972. Hurricane Agnes caused flood damage, preventing operation of trains on the branch, and the damage was not repaired. The branch was converted to the 21st-century Lebanon Valley Rail Trail after the rails were removed.
