= Robert Habersham Coleman =

American industrialist (1856–1930)

- Born: March 27, 1856; Savannah, Georgia, U.S.
- Died: March 15, 1930 (aged 73); Hyde Park, New York, U.S.
- Burial place: Laurel Hill Cemetery
- Education: Trinity College
- Occupations: ironmaster, railroad president, industrialist
- Known for: "Iron King of Pennsylvania"
- Board member of: Trinity College

Robert Habersham Coleman (March 27, 1856 – March 15, 1930) was an iron industrialist, railroad president, and owner of extensive farmland in Pennsylvania. He was nationally known as the "Iron King of Pennsylvania." In 1879, he was worth about $7 million (equivalent to $241,875,000 in today's money). By 1889, he had turned that into $30 million (equivalent to $1,075,000,000 in today's money). At the time, he had more money than his contemporaries A. J. Drexel, Marshall Field, J. P. Morgan or Frederick William Vanderbilt.

He was "rich, progressive, generous, honest—he was utterly crushed by the financial panic of 1893."

== Early life ==
Coleman was born in Savanah, Georgia, the son of Susan Ellen Habersham (1835–1892) and William Coleman (1826–1864). His paternal great-grandfather, Robert Coleman, established an ironmaking dynasty in Cornwall, Pennsylvania in last quarter of the 1700s.

When his father died in 1864, nine-year-old Coleman and his seven-year-old sister Anne jointly inherited 1/3 of the Cornwall Ore Mines in Pennsylvania, as well as $1.2 million each in a trust (equivalent to $24,702,128 in today's money). The Cornwall Ore Mines was"the world's richest iron mine." His r wealth grew during the Civil War because of the need for munitions. Samuel Small, Coleman's guardian, protected the estate through economic crises by investing in farmland and herds of prize livestock. Small also expanded the inherited ironmaking business, purchasing Donaghmore Furnace in Lebanon and constructing the Burd Coleman Furnaces in North Cornwall, Pennsylvania.

Ellen Coleman purchased a residence on Madison Avenue in New York City. The family also spent time in her hometown of Savannah and traveled to England, France, and Germany in the summers. Coleman was educated by his mother. When he was fifteen, he enrolled in the Rectory, a school in Hamden, Connecticut.

Three years later, he attended Trinity College where he became interested in all things mechanical, especially trains. He became class president, president of the chess club, and a member and president of the Fraternity of Delta Psi (aka St. Anthony Hall). He also played first base and was manager of Trinity's baseball team. He was elected by his classmates to give the oratory at the exercises of February 22, 1877. He graduated from Trinity in 1877, next to last in his class academically—but he was selected as most popular. His popularity was probably influenced by "his generous parties, dances, sports, and musical pursuits."

When he turned 21 in 1877, Coleman received access to his trust fund. He also gained full ownership and control of the mines, iron furnaces, and land—his total inheritance was worth an estimate $7 million (equivalent to $211,640,625 in today's money).

== Career ==
=== Iron business ===
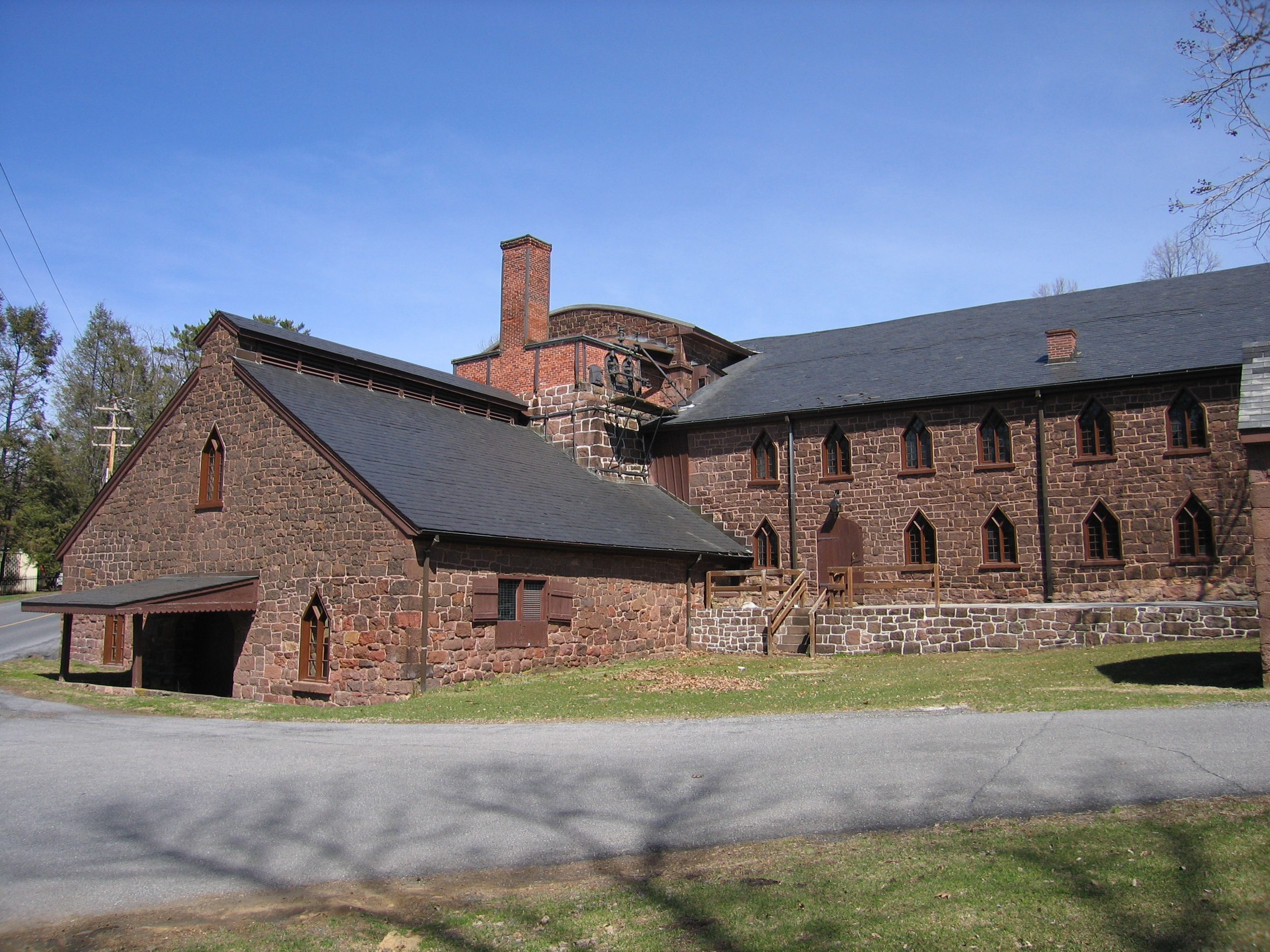
Cornwall Furnace

In 1879 at the age of 22, Coleman became president of the Cornwall Ore Bank Company and quickly proved to be "a man of brains and enterprise." He was the fourth-generation in his family to manage the Cornwall Iron Furnace, in Cornwall, Pennsylvania.

Coleman was influenced by the new manager of the Cornwall Ironworks, Artemus Wilhelm, who was a risk-taker. In 1879, he acquired land in western Lancaster County, Pennsylvania and began constructing two modern anthracite furnaces, Colebrook I and Colebrook II, at Sixteenth and Cumberland Streets. He also worked to create the Lebanon Iron Company which utilized the raw material created in his furnaces. In 1883, he closed the old family Cornwall Furnace that was obsolete. He also bought all of his sister's shares in the family business. No longer needing a mentor, he terminated Wilhelm's services in 1885.

In 1889, work stopped at Colebrook Furnace I for several months after six men were killed there. Coleman took care of the widows and children. By December 1889, all six of his furnaces were back in operation.

=== Railroads ===
==== Cornwall & Lebanon Railroad ====
In 1881, Coleman attempted to purchase a controlling interest in the Cornwall Railroad (CRR) which was owned by his uncle-by-marriage, William Coleman Freeman. The CRR was an industrial line that served the Coleman mines and furnaces. Freeman turned Coleman down—twice. Freeman had also turned down the Pennsylvania Railroad's offer the year before, but Coleman must have taken Freeman's refusal hard as this was "the inciting incident in what has long been reported as a personal and business rivalry between the two cousins."

In 1882, Coleman built the Cornwall & Lebanon Railroad (C&L) at his own expense. He also founded the Colebrook Railroad, merging it with the C&L in 1886. To build the C&L, Coleman had to cross the CRR, which ended up in litigation and a lot of expenses, including building a large fill and iron bridge over the Cornwall. At one point, Freeman brought in 250 men to tear up 400 feet (120 m) of a newly constructed C&L branch, dumping its materials over a steep embankment. Coleman eventually won the court cases and his railroad was more profitable than his cousin's because it served both industries and passengers and connected to the Pennsylvania Railroad at Conewago Junction near Cornwall. In 1880, Pennsylvania was the largest railroad in the world.

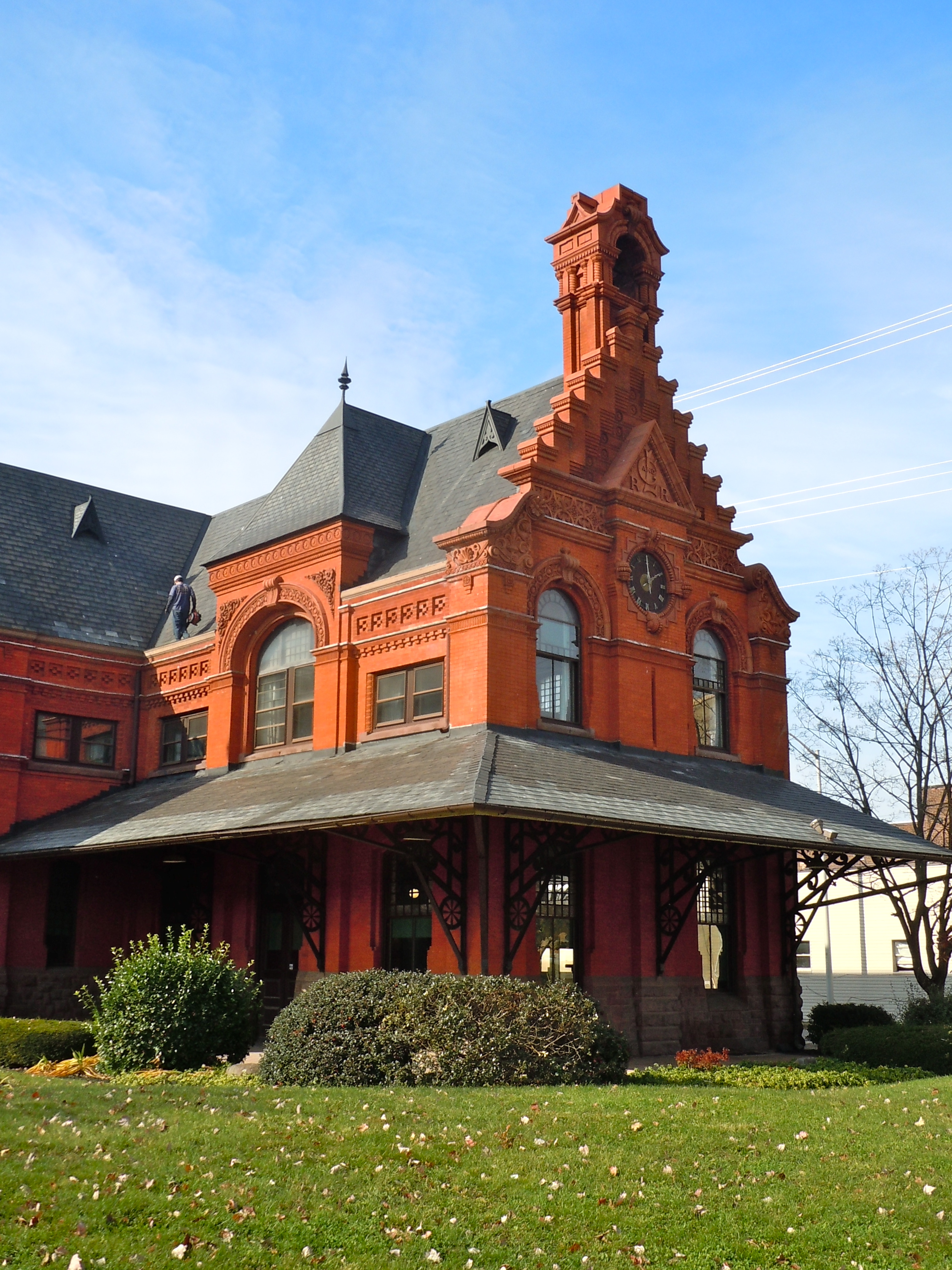
Cornwall & Lebanon Railroad Station, Lebanon, Pennsylvania

The rivalry between the two cousins continued. One historian notes, "Often the passenger trains of the Cornwall Railroad and the Cornwall & Lebanon Railroad would race each other from Cornwall to Lebanon. One train would sometimes delay its schedule to wait for the other—and then the race was on! This must have been a great thrill for the more hardy passengers. I have been told that Mr. Robert Coleman himself took over the engineer's job on a few occasions to race."

Coleman maintained his trains with "fierce pride, making sure that metal remained polished and the interiors spotless." In 1885, he hired architects G. W. & W. D. Hewitt to design a Queen Ann style railroad station in Lebanon, Pennsylvania. Coleman's seventeen-mile long railroad started in Lebanon and went to Cornwall and Elizabethtown. Along the way, it passed through a scenic wooded area in the mountains along Conewago Creek. There in 1882, Coleman created Mount Gretna, a pleasure stop on the railroad.

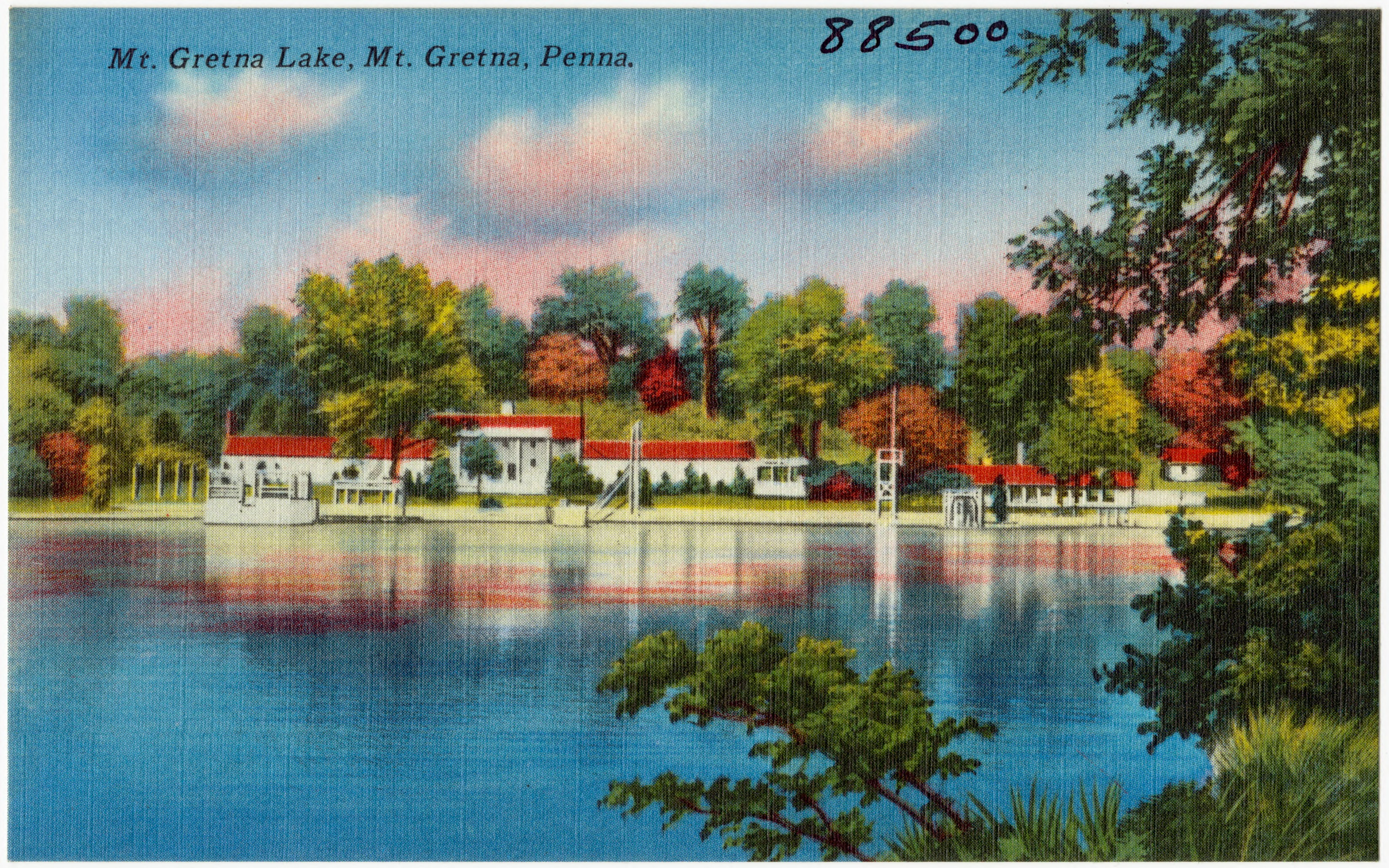
Lake Conewago at, Mount Gretna

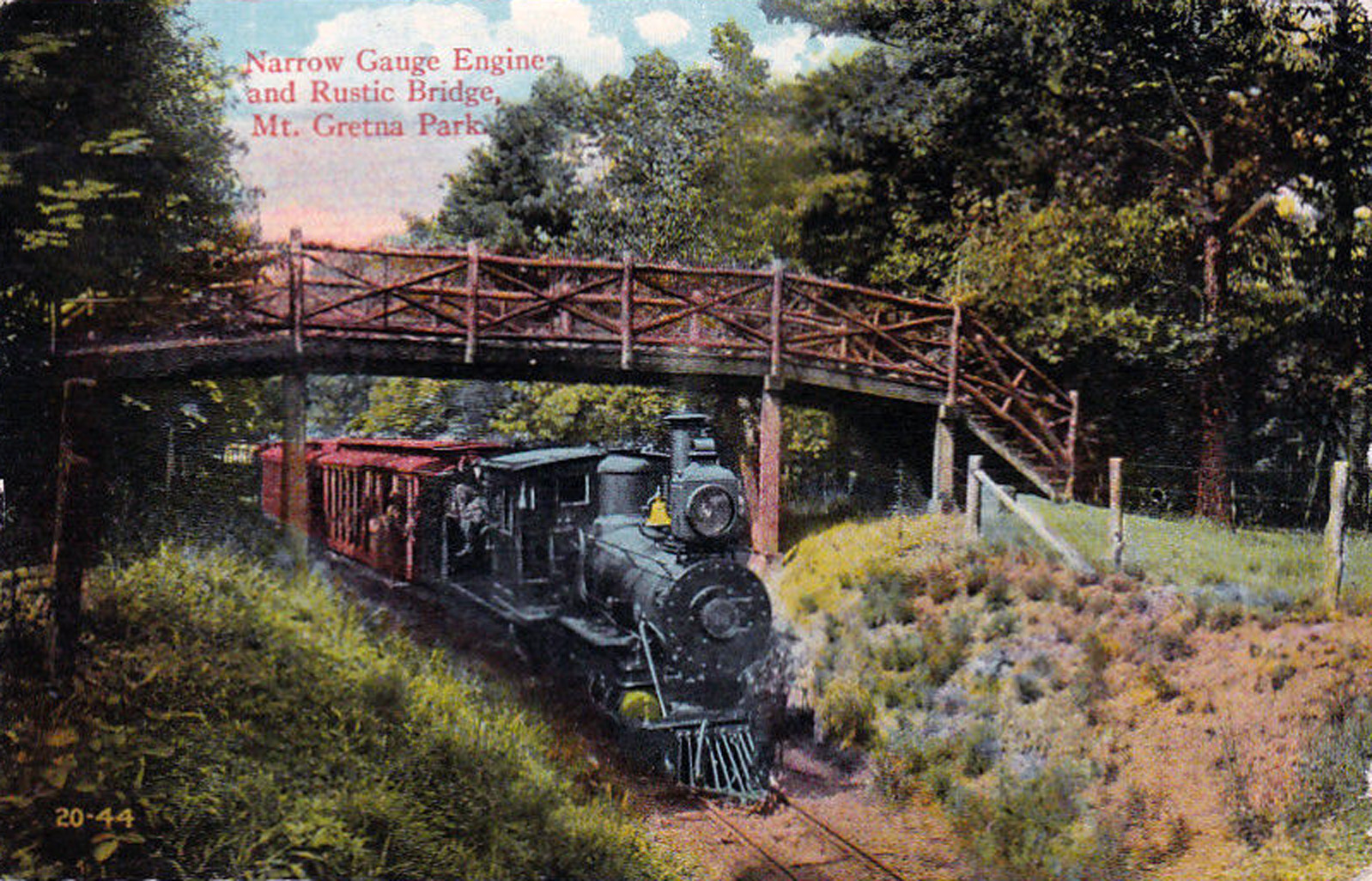
Mount Gretna narrow gauge railroad

==== Mount Gretna Railroad ====
Initially, Mount Gretna offered visitors a picnic grove with wildflowers and natural springs. Although Mount Gretna gave people another reason to ride his railroad, Coleman was still competitive with Freeman who had previously created a pleasure resort, Penryn Park. In a few years, Coleman added a hotel, pavilions, a playground, an amusement park with a carousel, a store, a dance hall, and a skating rink to Mount Gretna. In 1885, Coleman dammed Conewago Creek, creating Lake Conewago for swimming and boating.

One of Mount Gretna's main attractions was a narrow gauge railway to the top of Governor Dick Mountain, built by Coleman in twelve weeks in the spring of 1889. This train was unique for several reasons—its rail was only 2 feet (0.61 m) wide and it was the only track in the country to run 4-4-0 type locomotives. Coleman ordered three of these scaled-down locomotives from the Baldwin Locomotive Works in Philadelphia. As one historian noted, "[Coleman] wanted a choo-choo, and he had the money to buy one." The Governor Dick narrow gauge was "Coleman's greatest pride" and an immediate success; it attracted 36,000 visitors in its first season. That summer, Coleman entertained a large group of Trinity College alumni at Mount Gretna.

The Governor Dick train only operated in the warmer months because its cars were open-air. It ran for some 4 miles (6.4 km), traveling along the lake, passing over Conewago Creek, and climbing Governor Dick to a 200 feet (61 m) loop. Coleman built a pavilion and a 60 feet (18 m) tall observatory at the summit. There were six train excursions daily, leaving from Lebanon. The trip cost a quarter (equivalent to $9 in today's money). An ad noted that the train "throws open for view the magnificent scenery of the South Mountain, and this novel attraction is supplemented by the erection of an Observatory 60 feet (18 m) on the mountain's highest peak, Gov. Dick from which a sight may be obtained than which there are few grander, the view taking in an area of forty miles square, and presenting a landscape of unparalleled beauty."

In 1890, Coleman added a 1.5 miles (2.4 km) branch to the narrow gauge railroad, running to the rifle range that he built for the annual Pennsylvania National Guard encampment at Mount Gretna. This branch operated until 1916.

==== Jacksonville, Tampa & Key West Railroad ====
In 1883, Coleman invested in a Florida company that manufactured railroad parts, purchasing $356,000 (or $12,301,071 in today's money)of capital stock. Then, he partnered with several New York backers to expand his railroad interests into Florida. He purchased a 50 miles (80 km) stretch of the Jacksonville to Palatka Railroad and a railroad company in anticipation of building the Jacksonville, Tampa & Key West Railway. However, it construction plans were so challenging that his backers withdrew, leaving Coleman to fund the railroad on its own.

Coleman was so convinced of the value of this railroad, that he went forward by mortgaging virtually all of his assets, including the ore mines, furnaces, and bank holdings. To cover the interest on his debts, he borrowed $500,000 (equivalent to $17,916,667 in today's money) from the Pennsylvania Trust Company on January 21, 1891; this was followed by a forced loan of $1.5 million (equivalent to $53,750,000 in today's money) on February 21, 1891. He also took out a mortgage for $62,500 (or $2,239,583 in today's money) on June 30, 1892, to cover the interest that was due and past-due.

=== Other businesses ===
Coleman tackled his family's farms in Lancaster County, Lebanon County, and York County, Pennsylvania which consisted of 25,000 acres (10,000 ha). He modernized production and marketing, increasing profits. He founded a rolling mill. He also acquired a majority interest in the Lebanon Dimes Savings Bank and built a new building at 8th and Cumberland Streets in Lebanon.

=== Collapse ===
Around 1891, the Coleman family lost a lawsuit against the Grubb family—descendants of the original builder of Cornwall Furnace who still owned one-sixth of the ironworks and mines—who had been taking increasingly more ore without compensating the Colemans. Later in 1891, Coleman lost $1.5 million (equivalent to $53,750,000 in today's money) to the Pennsylvania Trust Company in court, indicating that his short-term loans related to the railroad in Florida were then past due.

When the financial Panic of 1893 started in November 1892 and the stock market virtually collapsed, Coleman was without the cash needed to repay his various mortgages for the Jacksonville, Tampa & Key West Railway. When foreclosure proceedings started, he had no choice but to let the railroad go as his liabilities totaled $3.5 million (equivalent to $125,416,667 in today's money) . However, its sale took place during the height of the economic depression, and the company was rendered valueless. Ironically, Coleman's vision for the Jacksonville, Tampa & Key West Railway was sound; within five years, it was profitable and would have made him millions. However, being over-leveraged, he was instead made penniless. Coleman also lost the Cornwall & Lebanon Railroad during the crisis; about 1/3 of the nation's railroads went into bankruptcy during this time.

Coleman then lacked the funds to pay employees to operate the iron mines and furnaces. He closed the Cornwall Furnace forever on February 11, 1883. Next, the Lebanon Dimes Savings Bank began to teeter. Coleman attempted to keep the bank afloat by paying its creditors with his funds. He would have been successful if not for another court case where he lost $2 million (equivalent to $71,666,667 in today's money) to the Pennsylvania Trust Company in August 1893. This destroyed what was left of Coleman's fortune. When he could no longer cover the bank's debts, it collapsed in late August 1893, taking its depositors' savings. In September 1893, the last operating Coleman furnace also closed.

Coleman's bankruptcy assignee was the Pennsylvania Company for Insurance on Lives and Granting Annuities. In On May 14, 1894, the Lackawanna Iron Company of Scranton, Pennsylvania purchased Coleman's mines and furnaces for a reported $3 million (equivalent to $111,634,615 in today's money), with a third of that being in cash. Their purchase included a 15% share in the Cornwall ore banks, two Cornwall anthracite furnaces, a 125 acres (51 ha) farm connected to the ore banks and the controlling interest in the Cornwall & Lebanon Railroad. The assignee said this sale would pay for all of Coleman's debts.

Without Coleman's backing, Mount Gretna suffered. The Governor Dick line stopped operating after 1894 or 1896. Beginning in 1913, the Pennsylvania Railroad began to purchase the Cornwall & Lebanon Railroad stock, owning it outright by 1918.

== Philanthropy ==
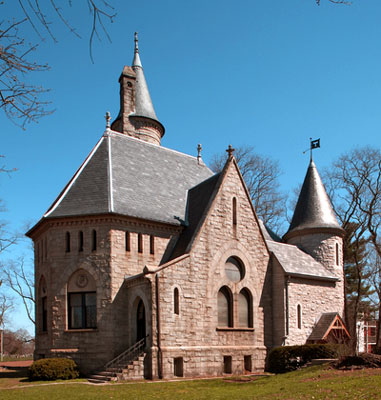
Saint Anthony Hall at Trinity College is listed on the National Register of Historic Places

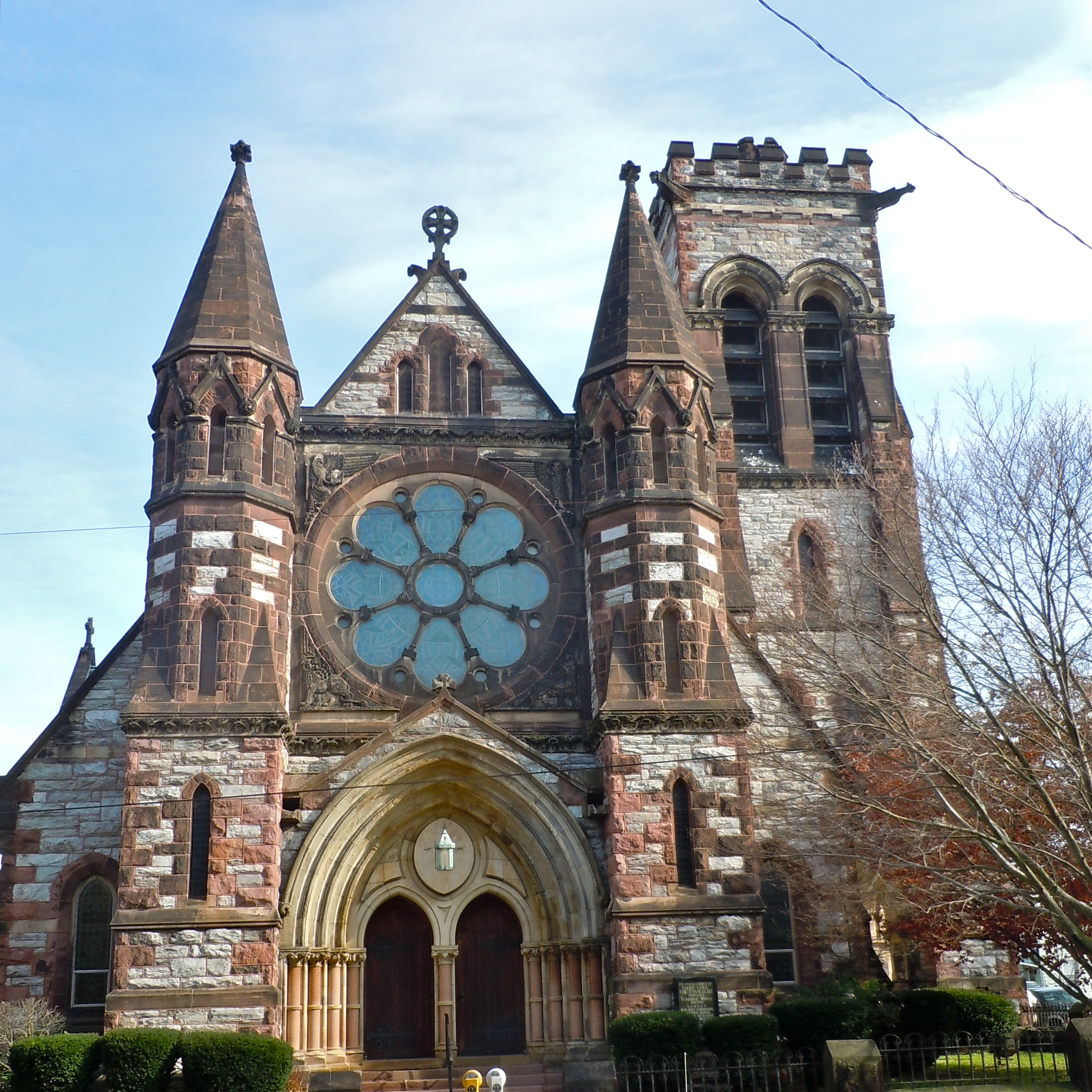
St Luke's Episcopal Church is listed on the National Register of Historic Places

When he gained control of his trust fund in 1877, Coleman made a $10,000 (equivalent to $302,344 in today's money) gift to the York Collegiate Institute in honor of his former guardian, Samuel Small Sr. Small, a wealthy banker in New York City, managed the Coleman siblings' trusts without compensation for sixteen years. In 1877, Coleman also donated $25,000 (or $755,859 in today's money) toward a $28,000 chapter house for his fraternity of St. Anthony Hall—while he was still a student at Trinity. The new Saint Anthony Hall chapter house was designed by architect and fraternity brother J. Cleaveland Cady and is now on the National Register of Historic Places.

When he graduated from Trinity in June 1877, Coleman paid for a "magnificent ball" on the college's new campus. In 1878, he donated a large organ to Trinity College. Around 1883, Coleman was one of two major donors for the construction of Alumni Hall, a new gymnasium for Trinity. The gym was dedicated in 1887 and used until it burned in 1967. Coleman also served three terms as a trustee of Trinity College.

In 1879, with funding from the Coleman family, the construction of St. Luke's Episcopal Church in Lebanon, Pennsylvania was underway. In 1880, Coleman paid for its completion. Designed by Henry Martyn Congdon of New York City, the church was consecrated in October 1880 in memory of his late wife Lillie. This Ruskinian gothic style church was built of grey stone and included a 100 feet (30 m)tall tower, seating for 500 people, floor tiles from Valencia, and a hydraulic engine in its basement to supply air for the organ. Later, Coleman provided funds to build a church in Mt. Pleasant, the village attached to the Colebrook Furnace. Called Trinity Chapel, its cornerstone was laid on May 27, 1888.

Coleman directed a portion of his wealth to support his 5,000 workers and their families. He built houses and schools for his workers. He paid their hospital bills. He also organized regular outings for employees. At Christmas, each employee received a bonus check, and each Cornwall family was given a turkey and toys for the children.

In 1887, Coleman donated musical instruments to the Perseverance Band of Lebanon. He ordered the finest instruments available from Paris and Germany, including a bassoon, euphonium, concert flute, two French horns, an oboe, an alto saxophone, a bass saxophone, a soprano saxophone, and a tenor saxophone.

In 1892, Coleman invited the Pennsylvania Chautauqua and the United Brethren Camp Meeting to use Mount Gretna without charge. In 1894, he also built a rifle range and lured the Pennsylvania National Guard's annual encampment to Mount Gretna.

== Personal ==
On January 15, 1879, Coleman married Jennie Lillie Clarke (1853–1880) in Hartford, Connecticut. She was the foster daughter of Mr. and Mrs. Lucius Barbour of Hartford, and the daughter of the late Sylvester Clarke who had been a clergyman in New Haven Connecticut. The couple spent their honeymoon traveling in a private railroad car, returning to live with the Coleman family house in Lebanon. This was a temporary arrangement, as Coleman hired William Bleddyn Powell, a Philadelphia architect to plan their new home. In 1879, the three-year construction project began on Cornwall Hall, on his family property in Lebanon.

On November 8, 1879, the couple sailed on a six-month trip to Europe where they planned on purchasing furnishings for Cornwall Hall. Lillie became ill with malaria in February, and they went to Italy for its curative climate. When she did not recover, they traveled to France for doctors. Lillie died in Paris on May 10, 1880. Her body was returned to Pennsylvania and entombed in the crypt underneath the altar at St. Luke’s in Lebanon, that was dedicated in her honor. In his grief, Coleman stopped work on Cornwall Hall and ordered that it be razed, obliterating "every trace of what was intended" in two weeks.

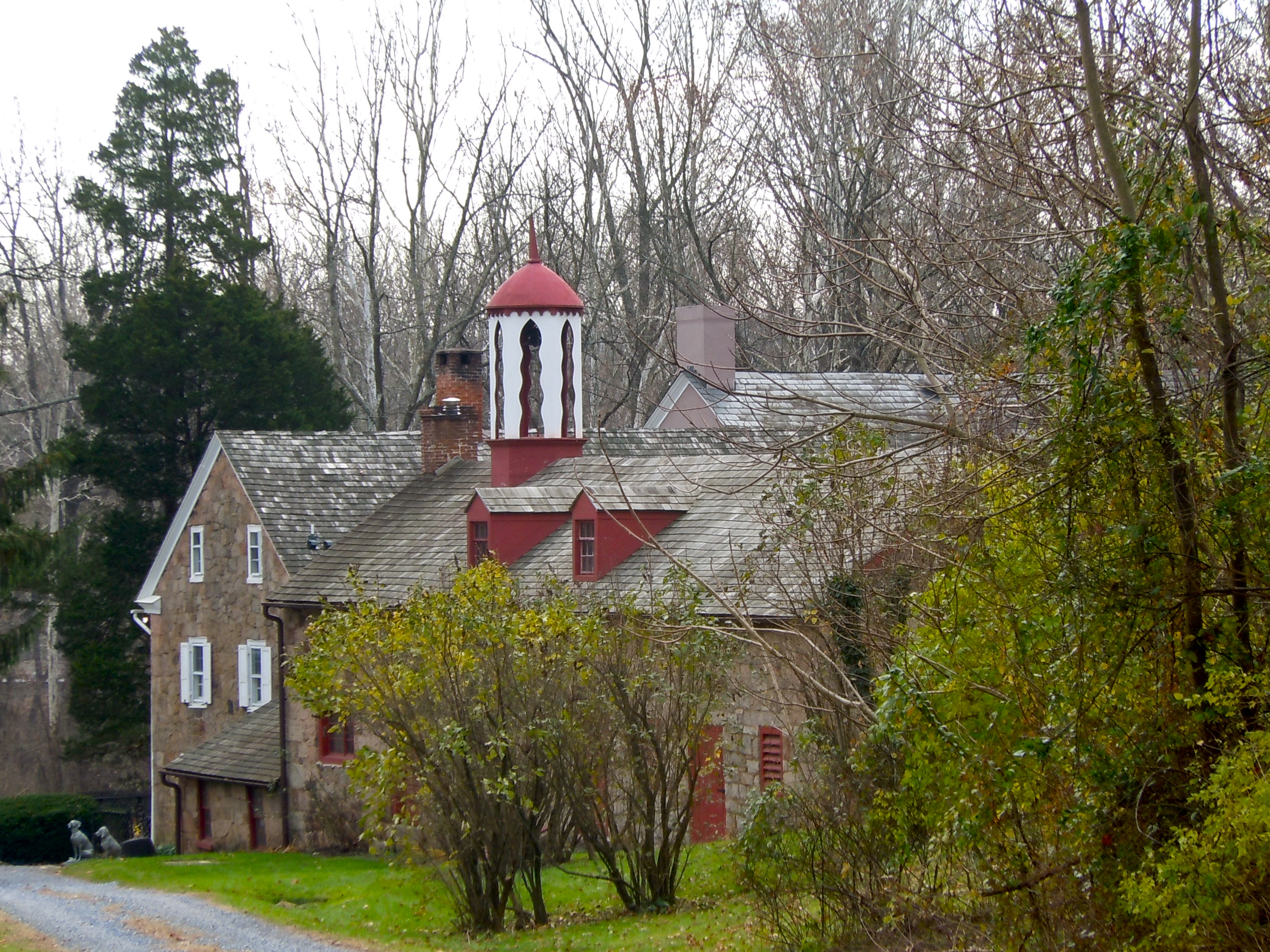
Elizabeth Farms, now called the Stiegel Coleman House, is a National Historic Landmark

Coleman married Edith Elliott Johnstone (1858–1903) on October 1, 1884. Edith was an orphan from Savannah, Georgia that Coleman's family adopted during the Civil War. Not only did the Coleman and Edith grow up together, she had also been Lillie's bridesmaid. They had five children: Robert Coleman Jr. (born 1885), William Cassatt Coleman (born 1886), Ralph Elliott Coleman (born 1888), Neyle Habersham Coleman (born 1889), and Annie Caroline Coleman (born 1890).

The family lived in Elizabeth Farms, the house built by Coleman's great-grandfather, located near the Cornwall Iron Furnace facility in Cornwall, Pennsylvania. They decorated their home with furniture from Napoleon's palace and relics from Pompeii and Herculaneum. Around 1886, Coleman added a stable, designed by architect William Bleddyn Powell, that was large enough for nineteen horses and several carriages, with rooms above for grooms and attendants. Other additions to the estate included greenhouses, dog kennels, a swimming pool, bowling alleys, and Coleman's workshop where he tinkered and ran model trains. Coleman, who was a talented musician, also added a music hall or conservatory in 1887, along with pianos and a $10,000 ($358,333 in today's money) pipe organ with three manuals, fifty stops, and 2,000 pipes. This organ was said to be the finest work of its maker, the Rosewalt Pipe Organ Company of New York.

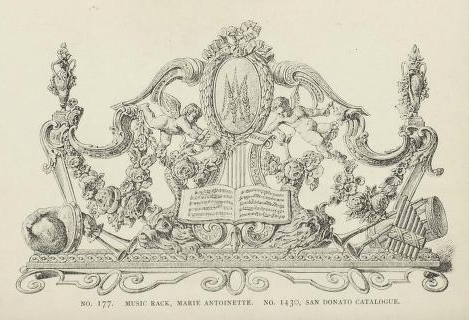
Marie Antoinette's Music Rack, Coleman Collection

On November 29, 1892, Coleman auctioned his collection of relics and antique works of art through The Fifth Avenue Auction Rooms in New York City. The auction catalog of 177 items gives insight to the art that once decorated the Coleman mansion; most items were chosen for him by art collector James Jackson Jarves. The auction catalog says, "The collection consists of objects of art, in gold, silver, and the various applications of high-class gilt work, upon the finest models of the present and past centuries; of choice pieces of tapestry and embroidery, sculpture, wood-carving, pottery, marbles, paintings and antiques of every sort." Coleman and Jarves acquired the majority of the collection from the estate of Prince Nikolay Demidov of Villa San Donato. Highlights included items from the 18th-century French Court, Marie Antoinette, and Napoleon Bonaparte. Another item of note is a stiletto once owned by Corsini de Medici, circa 1540.

In late 1893, Coleman gave up on salvaging his family's fortune. He was also diagnosed with tuberculosis. The Colemans left Lebanon County for New York. However, before he left, Coleman took one last ride up the Governor Dick narrow gauge line with his son, an engineer, a fireman, and a photographer. Reportedly, all the Coleman family left Pennsylvania with was a horse, buggy and clothes.

However, Coleman still owned his mother's house in New York City. Around 1896, they decided to live in Saranac Lake, New York in the Adirondack Mountains for Coleman's health. He hired architect William L. Coulter to design a shingle style cottage. Its construction was underway by September 1896. Coleman Cottage was located on 3/5 of an acre at 33 Church Street, but also had frontage on River Street. Coleman built his home on top of the hill, to the rear of the regular set-back of the neighborhood. This gave them a view of Lake Flower, and also provided privacy. The Coleman Cottage had a tennis court and boat house. The deed for their new home was in Edith's name.

Coleman lived a quiet life in Saranac Lake for 34 years. He was a bird-watcher; his "List of Adirondack Birds" was included in Alfred L. Donaldson's A History of the Adirondacks (1921). However, he was a charter member of the Pontiac Club which sponsors Saranac Lake's Winter Carnival. He also was the treasure of the building committee for Lake Placid Episcopal Mission when it entered into a contract with the architect William L. Coulter on December 1, 1897. He also had to raise his children after Edith died from tuberculosis on May 20, 1903. Coleman's sister Anne helped, but the children were eventually sent away to school.

In 1900, the Lancaster newspapers reported that Coleman was a Wall Street stockbroker at a leading firm and was "growing wealthy again." This seems to be confirmed by The New York Times which mentions the New York Security and Trust Company assigning a mortgage to Robert H. Coleman, trustee, for $10,000 ($387,000 in today's money). However he still had debts; that same year, Coleman's beloved pipe organ was sold to the Longswamp Reformed Church of Mertztown, Pennsylvania at the bargain price of $1,200 ($46,440 in today's money) by Coleman's assignees.

In 1910, his 22-year-old son, Ralph, committed suicide, and Coleman became "almost a complete recluse" in his grief. Coleman opened a store that specialized in Havana Cigars in Saranac Lake around 1912, with his son William who had recently returned home from Trinity College, followed by travels out west. When the store failed, William stayed to help care for his father.

As he became increasingly ill from tuberculosis, Coleman's sister Anne cared for him. Between 1912 and 1921, Coleman Cottage was the winter home and private commercial sanatorium of the Arthur Duncan Moir family. It is unclear if Coleman still occupied the cottage in summer or if he had permanently moved to his sister's home. Coleman slipped into a coma in 1930. He died three days later at Annie's home in Hyde Park, New York. He was buried at Laurel Hill Cemetery in Philadelphia with only his sister and children in attendance.

== Honors ==
- Trinity College presented a loving cup to Coleman during commencement week in May 1890 in honor of his generous support.
- The Trinity chapter of Delta Psi made Coleman an active member for life, meaning his name was always at the top of their membership list in the Trinity yearbook.
- In the chapter room of Saint Anthony Hall at Trinity College, the fireplace has a brass plaque honoring Coleman.
- In 1932, Margaret Coleman Freeman Buckingham donated the Cornwall Iron Furnace with its stone furnace, steam-powered air-blast machinery, and related buildings to the Commonwealth of Pennsylvania. This site is a museum and National Historic Landmark District.

== External Sources ==
- Robert H. Coleman mansion and outbuildings, Lebanon County Historical Society
- Cornwall Heritage Trail
