= Lebanon Valley Rail Trail =

Rail trail in Pennsylvania, United States

- Length: 15.0 miles (24.1 km)
- Location: Lebanon County, PA
- Designation: National Recreation Trail
- Trailheads: US Rt 422; 40.338437°N 76.434535°W; Lancaster County line 40.197980°N 76.561725°W
- Use: hiking, cycling, horseback riding, skiing
- Elevation change: 328 feet (100 m)
- Highest point: West Cornwall Township, PA: 766 feet (233 m)
- Lowest point: north end: 439 feet (134 m) at Lebanon, PA; south end: 438 feet (134 m) at Lebanon / Lancaster county line
- Difficulty: easy
- Season: year-round
- Hazards: traffic (at road crossings)
- Surface: mostly crushed limestone, some asphalt sections
- Right of way: Cornwall-Lebanon Railroad
- Website: https://lebanonrailtrail.com/
Trail map

The Lebanon Valley Rail Trail (LVRT) is a National Recreation Trail. The rail trail goes from the southwestern border of Lebanon County and goes through Colebrook, Mt. Gretna, Cornwall, and the city of Lebanon. At the southern border of Lebanon County, Pennsylvania the LVRT connects with the Conewago Recreation Trail and continues for another 5.0 miles (8.0 km). The trail is partly built on the old Cornwall–Lebanon Railroad created by industrialist Robert H. Coleman in the 1880s. The trail runs 15.0 miles (24.1 km), and there are many phases in development that would extend the trail to northern Lebanon County and Jonestown. The trail features a packed stone path and paved path at many parts that traverses "Pennsylvania Dutch Country" and other scenic routes. Trail users see untouched woodlands of state gamelands, forests, and views of area fields and farms. The trail is maintained by dedicated group of volunteers, and allows for running, walking, biking, horseback riding, and cross-country skiing.

== Historical development ==
=== Historical significance ===
The Cornwall-Lebanon Railroad was built with $1.2 million in the 1880s by the rich socialite Robert H. Coleman. The railroad was used to carry passengers from Mt. Gretna, an extremely popular resort community of the time. Later the railroad was used to transport the Pennsylvania National Guard from their camp near Mt. Gretna. As time went on the railroad service stopped, which resulted in the rail being purchased by the Pennsylvania Railroad. This group continued use of the rail up until the powerful Hurricane Agnes devastated Lebanon County. The hurricane destroyed sections of the track in 1972.

The Cornwall-Lebanon Branch railroad was abandoned in 1979 by the Penn Central Railroad. At that time, a group of concerned local residents worked to convince the Lebanon County Commissioners to bid on the corridor for public recreational trail use. Unfortunately, the county was outbid and the rail line was transferred to private ownership. Ironically, this first attempt to acquire the trail was ahead of its time in that the rails-to-trails movement that has swept the nation really only began in earnest during the mid-1980s.

Twenty years later, interest in the rail-trail resurfaced as development pressure in the southern end of the county began to threaten available open space and recreational opportunities that residents had taken for granted for many years. Led by John Wengert Jr, the Lebanon Valley Rails-to-Trails Inc. was incorporated in 1996, and negotiations were initiated with Eastern Enterprises, the owner of the railbed south of the city of Lebanon to the Lancaster County line. Fortunately, large sections of the proposed rail-trail were still largely intact.

In December 1999, LVRT purchased the railbed from Eastern Enterprises and early in 2000 kicked off a community fundraising campaign which, together with several grants from the state funded trail surfacing and other improvements.

=== History and evolution ===
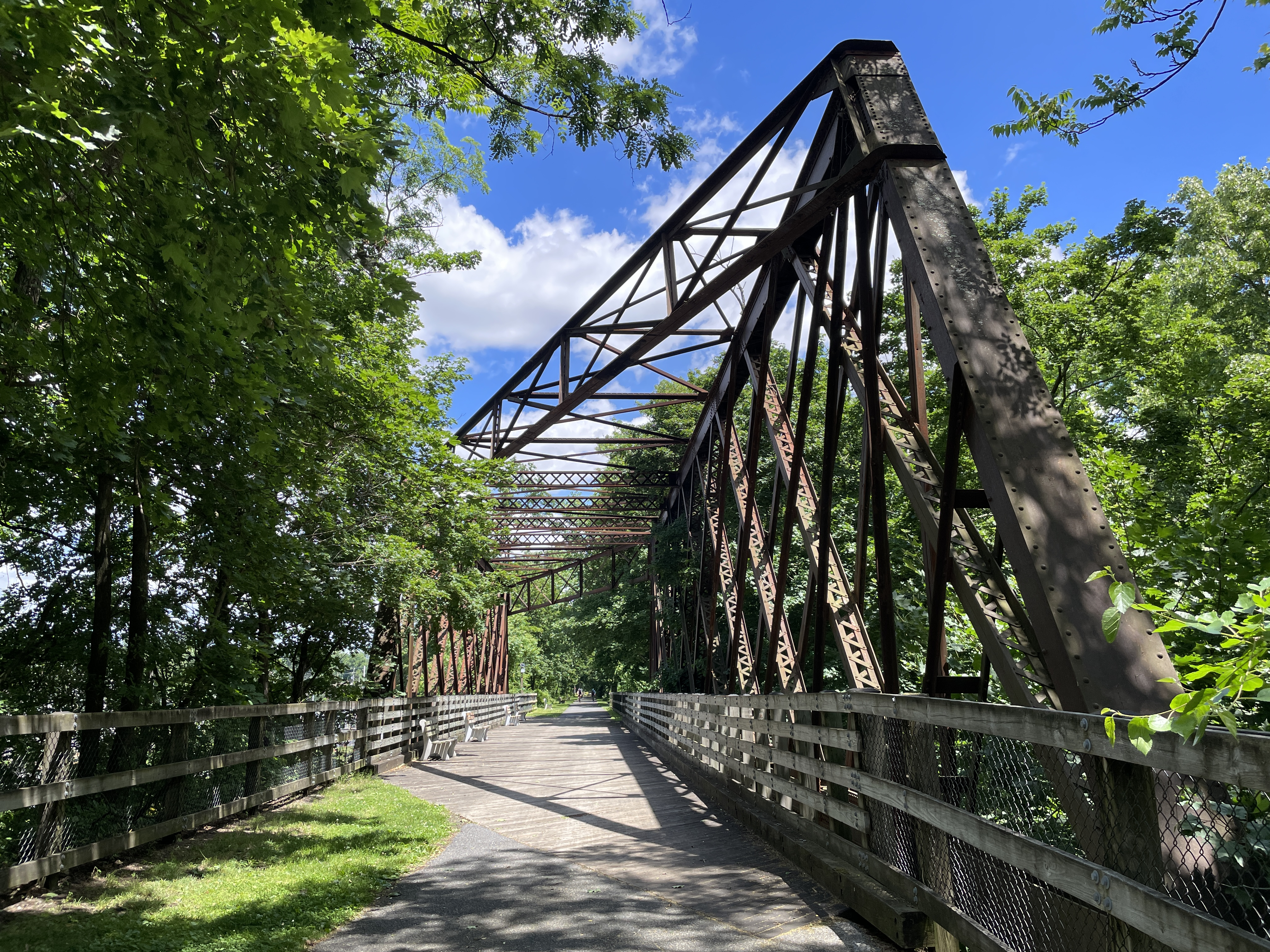
Lebanon Valley Rail Trail at C&L iron truss bridge in Cornwall

2009 marked the acquisition and development of a 2.5-mile extension to the City of Lebanon. The trail passes near Zinns Mill Road toward the Lebanon Expo Center, then to South Hill Park, and ending at the 8th Street trailhead. This section of the trail features a 10-foot-wide paved surface, equestrian path, and an above-ground bridge at Wilhelm Avenue. Construction cost $575,000 and was funded by personal donations and federal and state funds. The City of Lebanon extension was built upon the former Cornwall Industrial Track and acquired from the RJ Railroad Co which was used by Conrail to serve the local Alcoa plant in South Lebanon Township.

Modern-day extensions are focused on the updating of the Cornwall trailhead, which was partially funded by a $25,000 gift from the Friends of the Rexmont Dams. Studies are in progress to develop an area outside Jonestown that will one day connect to a Union Canal trail and the City of Lebanon section of the LVRT.

== Development ==
=== Design and construction ===
The trail consists of two parallel paths: one that is surfaced with crushed stone to accommodate walkers, runners, bikers, and cross country skiers in the winter, and one that is surfaced with wood chips to accommodate horseback riders. The majority of the trail is under canopy, with open areas in several locations. Two bridges can be found along the trail at Wilhelm Avenue and near the Cornwall Trail Head, while warning signs can be found at the six at-grade road crossings.

=== Amenities ===
Trailheads can be found at Lawn Road, Colebrook Road, Alden Place, Cornwall, near the Expo Center in Lebanon, and on 8th Street. Parking is available at all of these locations and also between Eckert and Lawn Road, and just east of Lincoln Ave near South Hills Park. Benches are placed in several locations along the trail and restrooms can be found at the Lawn, Colebrook and Cornwall Trail heads. A large root beer barrel located at the Cornwall trailhead serves as a small gift store and the trail is located in the vicinity of several restaurants and ice cream shops, an inn and bike shop.

== Community ==
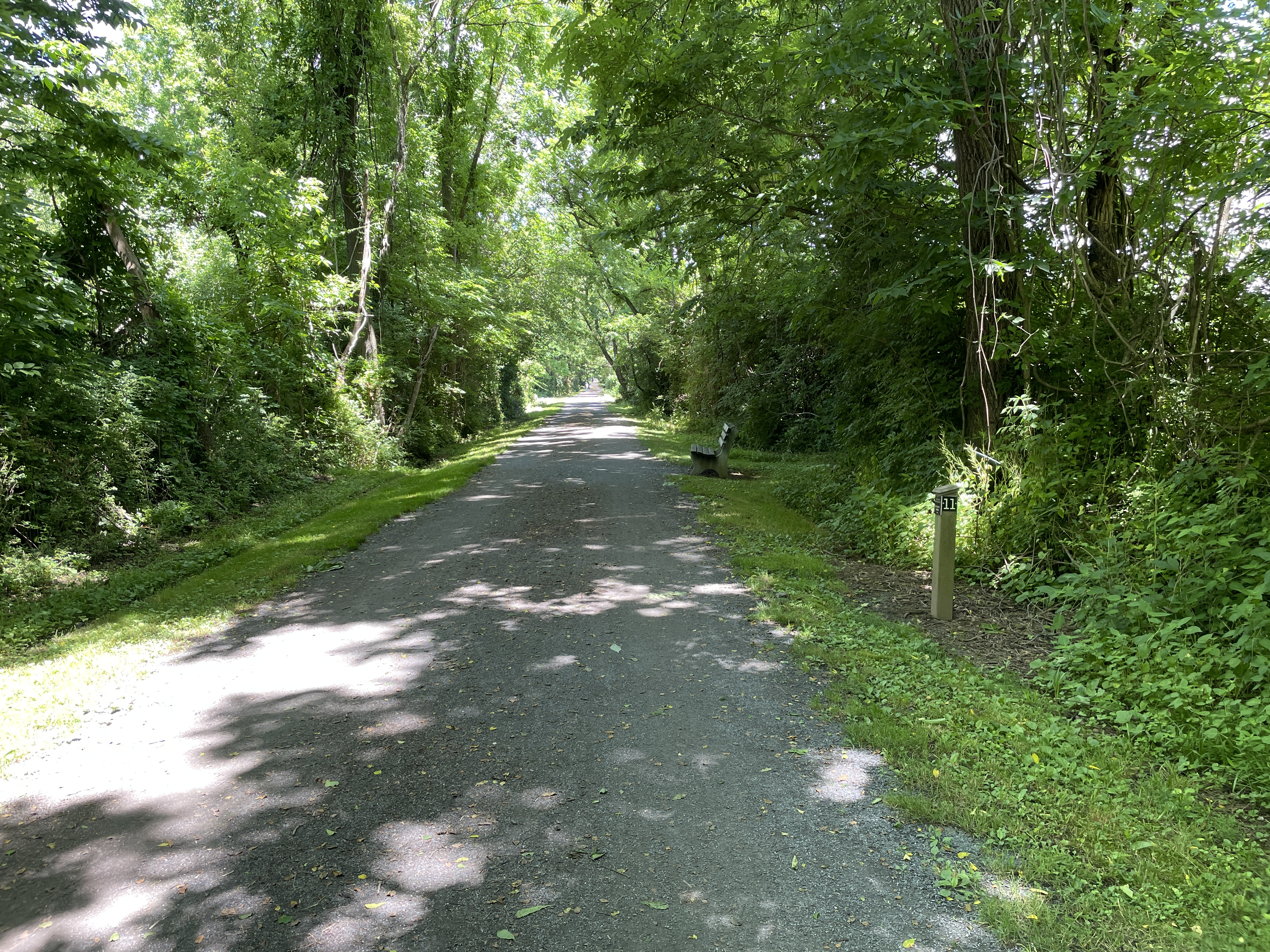
Lebanon Valley Rail Trail in Cornwall

=== Supporters ===
A quote directly from the LVRTs website:

The most unique aspect of the Lebanon Valley Rail-Trail is that all fundraising, construction management, trail maintenance and public relations is performed by an extremely dedicated core group of volunteers. Lebanon Valley Rails-to-Trail, Inc. is the non-profit organization formed in 1996 to spearhead this rail-trail's development and management. Operating in a county without a public parks and recreation department, LVRT filled the void with volunteer effort and "sweat equity". Local legislators were so impressed by the public support and the success of a private fundraising campaign which raised over $300,000 dollars for the first phase of the trail, that they responded by providing state grants to extend and complete development of subsequent sections.

=== Special events ===
The trail sponsors several events including Root Beer Barrel Day, capital fund-raising campaigns, high school team runs and organized bike rides. Root Beer Barrel Day is an appreciation event for the LVRT that uses the Cornwall Trailhead as a gathering location where trail goers are offered to buy food and gifts from the oversized root beer barrel shop located there. Another event significant to the trail is the Adopt a Bench program that offers supporters of the LVRT to donate a bench that will be placed along the trail with a plaque attached to it in honor of the donator. The Adopt a Foot program allows supporters of the trail to donate in a smaller amount that can help to increase the quality and maintenance of the trail.
