= St. Luke's Episcopal Church (Lebanon, Pennsylvania) =

Historic church in Pennsylvania, United States

- U.S. National Register of Historic Places
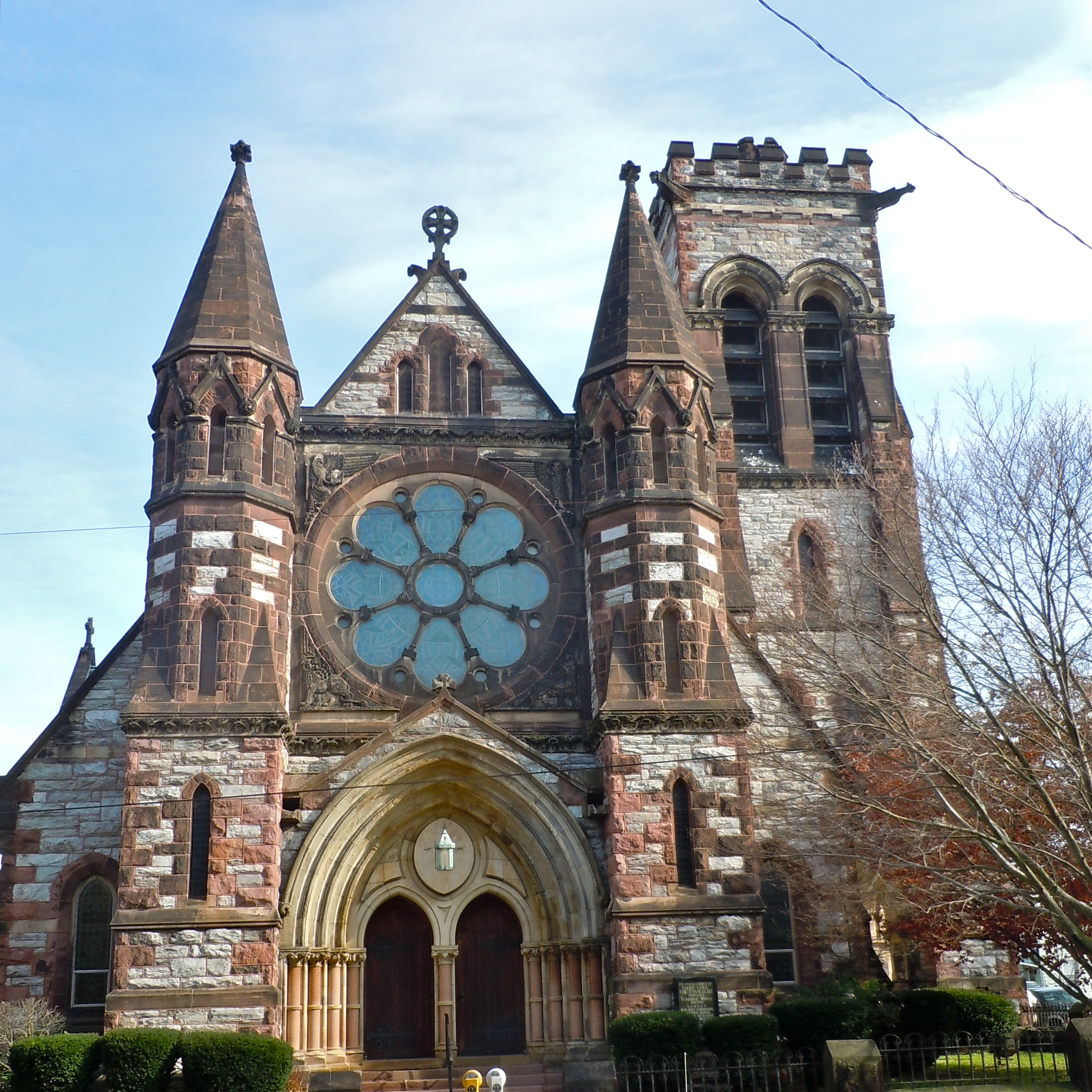
- St. Luke's Episcopal Church, November 2011

- Location within Pennsylvania Location within the United States
- Location: 6th and Chestnut Sts., Lebanon, Pennsylvania
- Coordinates: 40°20′17″N 76°25′16″W
- Area: 1 acre (0.40 ha)
- Built: 1880; 146 years ago
- Architect: Congdon, H.M.
- Architectural style: Gothic
- NRHP reference No.: 74001791
- Added to NRHP: September 4, 1974

St. Luke's Episcopal Church is a historic Episcopal church located at 6th and Chestnut Streets in Lebanon, Lebanon County, Pennsylvania. It is located in the jurisdiction of the Episcopal Diocese of the Susquehanna and was earlier part of the Episcopal Diocese of Bethlehem.

In 2017, the church reported 475 members. In 2025, the church reported 346 members Average Sunday Attendance (ASA) reported by the church in 2025 was 92 persons. This was a relative decrease from ASA of 139 persons reported in 2019. Plate and pledge financial support reported by the church in 2025 was $257,020.

== History and building ==
The cornerstone of the church was laid on St. Luke's Day, October 18, 1879 by Bishop Mark Antony De Wolfe Howe. The church was completed in 1880. It was designed by New York architect Henry Martyn Congdon (1834–1922) in the Ruskinian gothic style. It was paid for by iron baron Robert Habersham Coleman and dedicated in memory of Jane Lillie Coleman (1853-1880, née Clark), his recently deceased wife.

The building is in the form of a Latin Cross and constructed of native bluestone and sandstone. It measures 116 feet (35 m) long and 75 feet (23 m) wide, and features a square, 85-foot (26 m) tower with an octagonal turret. The roof is covered in rows of blue and red slate.

It was added to the National Register of Historic Places in 1974.

The church was originally incorporated as "Christ Church, of Lebanon, Pa." in 1859, and admitted that year to the Convention of the Diocese of Pennsylvania. The name of the church was changed in 1865 to the current name, "St. Luke's".
