= Chestnut Street Log House =

Historic house in Pennsylvania, United States

- U.S. National Register of Historic Places
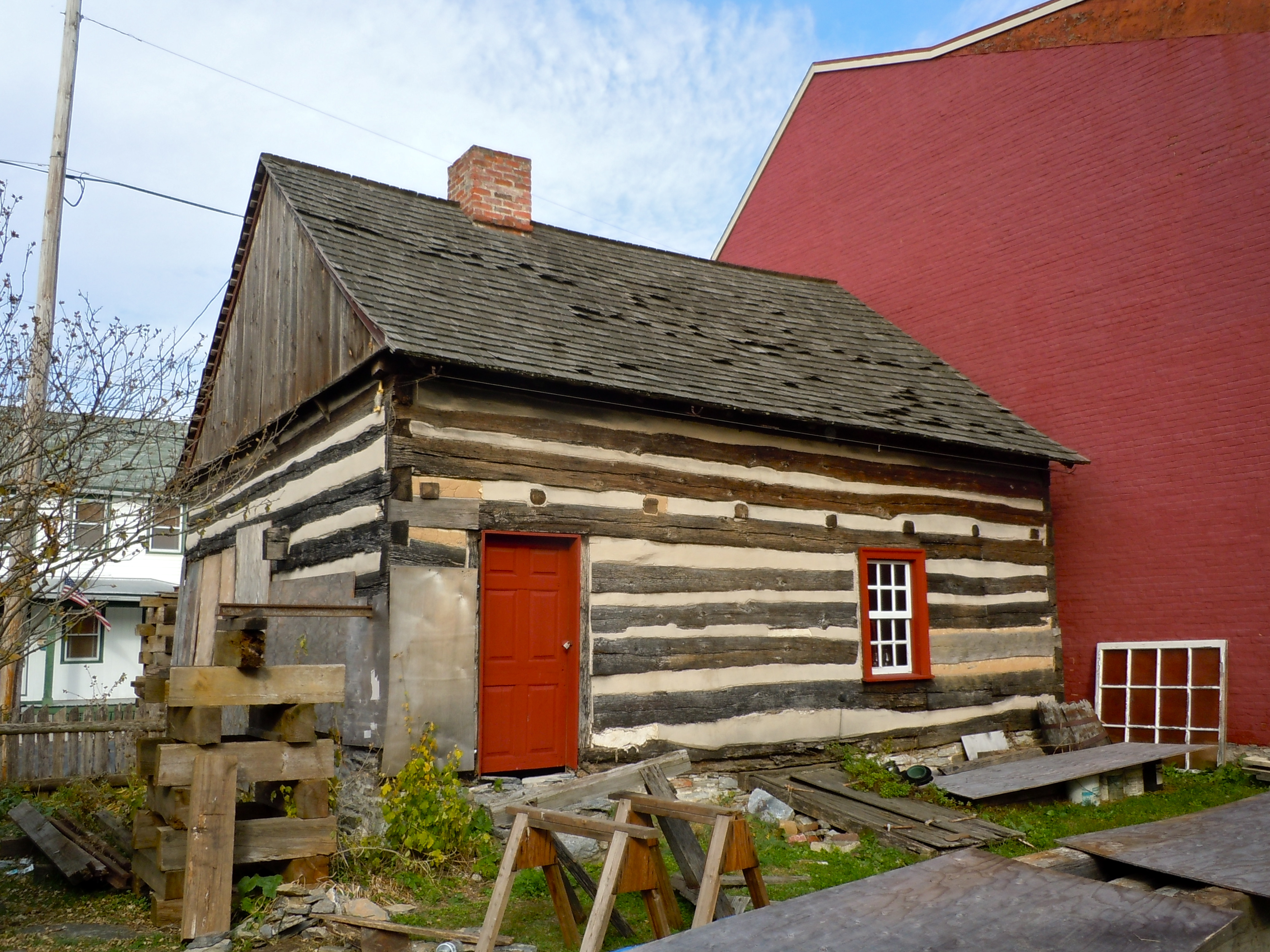
- Chestnut Street Log House, November 2011

- Location within Pennsylvania Location within the United States
- Location: 1110 Chestnut St., Lebanon, Pennsylvania
- Coordinates: 40°20′15″N 76°25′46″W
- Area: 0.1 acres (0.040 ha)
- Built: c. 1772
- Architectural style: Pennsylvania German log; Vernacular architecture
- NRHP reference No.: 78002424
- Added to NRHP: November 20, 1978

Chestnut Street Log House is a historic home located in Lebanon, Lebanon County, Pennsylvania. It was built around 1772, and is a 1 1/2-story, rectangular log residence on a limestone foundation. It is three bays wide and one bay deep, with a gable roof, and central fireplace. It is believed to have been raised 1 1/2-feet about 1850, and according to National Register of Historic Places records was restored to its 1700s appearance around 1978.

It was added to the National Register of Historic Places in 1978.
