= Conewago Recreation Trail =

Public recreational trail in Pennsylvania, US

- Length: 5.0 miles (8.0 km)
- Location: Lancaster County, Pennsylvania
- Trailheads: Pennsylvania Rt 230; 40.164379°N 76.640990°W; Lebanon County line 40.197980°N 76.561725°W
- Use: Hiking, Cycling, Horseback riding
- Elevation change: 54 feet (16 m)
- Highest point: North end: 438 feet (134 m)
- Lowest point: South end: 384 feet (117 m)
- Grade: 0.2% average
- Difficulty: Easy, except Mill Rd crossing
- Season: year-round
- Hazards: Traffic (at road crossings)
- Surface: Crushed limestone
- Right of way: Cornwall-Lebanon Railroad
- Website: Lancaster County Parks and Recreation
Trail map

The Conewago Recreation Trail is a public recreational rail trail that follows the once Cornwall-Lebanon Railroad rail corridor for a total of slightly over 5.0 miles. The trail stretches from Elizabethtown, Pennsylvania, to the Lebanon County Line, Pennsylvania, at which point it links up to the Lebanon Valley Rail Trail which continues for another 15.0 miles. The Conewago Recreation Trail runs adjacent to the Conewago Creek running through quiet farmland and forested areas.

Trail goers can enjoy walking, jogging, bicycling, horseback riding and other non-motorized recreational uses from dawn to dusk, seven days a week throughout the year. The majority of the trail is shaded by tree cover which limits the direct sunlight in the summer months. The level and crushed limestone makes the trail suitable for walkers, joggers, bicyclists, and horseback riding. Popular winter activities include cross-country skiing and snowshoeing.

== Historical development ==
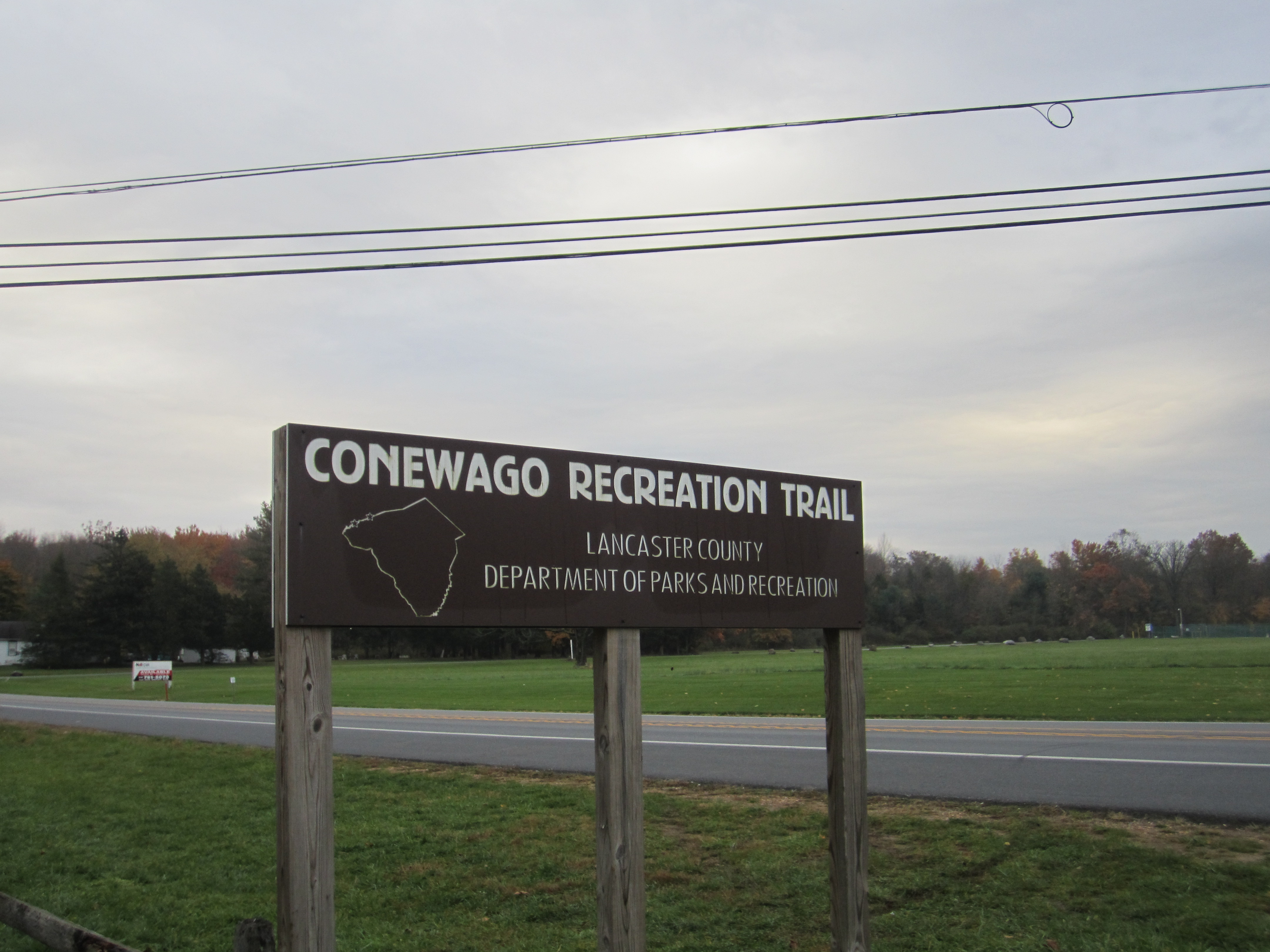
The Conewago Recreation Trail sign at trailhead Route 230 marking the start of the trail.

Historical significance

The Conewago Recreation Trail formerly served as the Cornwall-Lebanon Railroad. Robert H. Coleman, who was the owner of the Cornwall Iron Furnace at the time, built the line in 1883. The railroad was built with the intention of competing with the Cornwall Railroad, and served as a transportation system for heavy loads of iron, as well a way for people to travel to the popular resort owned by Coleman, Mt. Gretna. By 1910 it had up to 8 passengers a day. Later on the Pennsylvania Railroad purchased the railroad line from Coleman. After Hurricane Agnes destroyed the tracks in 1972, the railroad line was left abandoned and untouched until 1979, when it was acquired and restored by the County of Lancaster. It is now owned and maintained by the Lancaster County Department of Parks and Recreation.

Trail’s history and evolution

The Lancaster County Department of Parks and Recreation purchased the portion of the Cornwall-Lebanon Railroad that runs from Route 230 to the Lancaster/Lebanon County line in 1979 for $50,000, and developed the land into the Conewago Recreation Trail. The trail underwent great renovations in 2006 at a price of $560,420, getting approximately 50% in funding support from the Pennsylvania Department of Conservation and Natural Resources. The trail itself runs 5.0 miles, but connects at its northeastern terminus to the Lebanon Valley Rail Trail which is 15.0 miles in length.

== Trail development ==
Design and Construction

The Conewago Recreation Trail is just over 5.0 miles in length and no wider than 8 feet. The crushed stone and mainly level surface make it wheelchair accessible excluding the intersection crossing at Mill Road. While the trail is handicap inaccessible at the Mill Road crossing intersection, and from this point in either direction the trail remains handicap accessible. The Path is suitable for a number of activities such as, biking, running, walking, cross-country skiing, and horseback riding. It is a very scenic route, as it runs alongside the Conewago Creek for majority of the way, and goes through the Lancaster County farmland. As the trail comes to an end the surface changes, and it connects into the Lebanon Valley Rail Trail, which is also marked with signs.

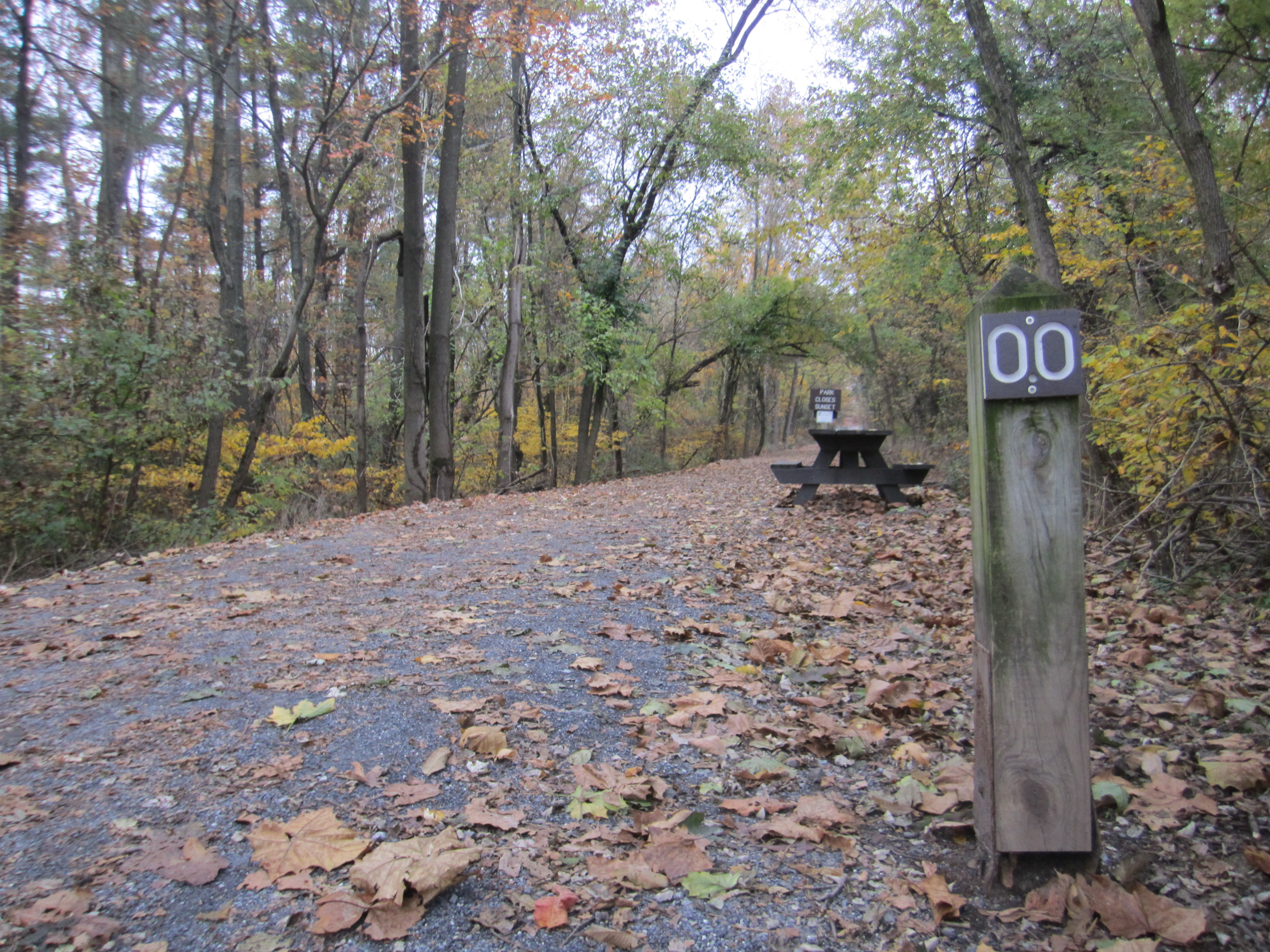
The start of the Conewago Recreation Trail at trailhead 230 with distance markers in the foreground and a bench in the background.

Trail Amenities

There are 5 different parking locations throughout the Conewago Recreation Trail. The trail has six street crossings of which all have well marked signs that make it very safe for trail use. The Rails to Trails Bike Shop located on the trail serves multiple purposes as people can go there for bike malfunctions, to buy new equipment, or simply ask a question with regard to the trail. A limited number of benches can be observed on the trail, and the majority of the trail is surrounded by trees which provides shade on a hot day. Distance markers are located at every half mile.

== Governance ==
Trail Ownership

The Conewago Recreation Trail is managed and maintained by the Lancaster County Department of Parks and Recreation. The Department of Parks and Recreation is a division of the Lancaster County Government. Among other obligations, the Department of Parks and Recreation is responsible for the county’s land and water assets dedicated to recreation. These locations hold value and significance to the community in regard to their various historical, geological and ecological values.

Maintenance and Preservation

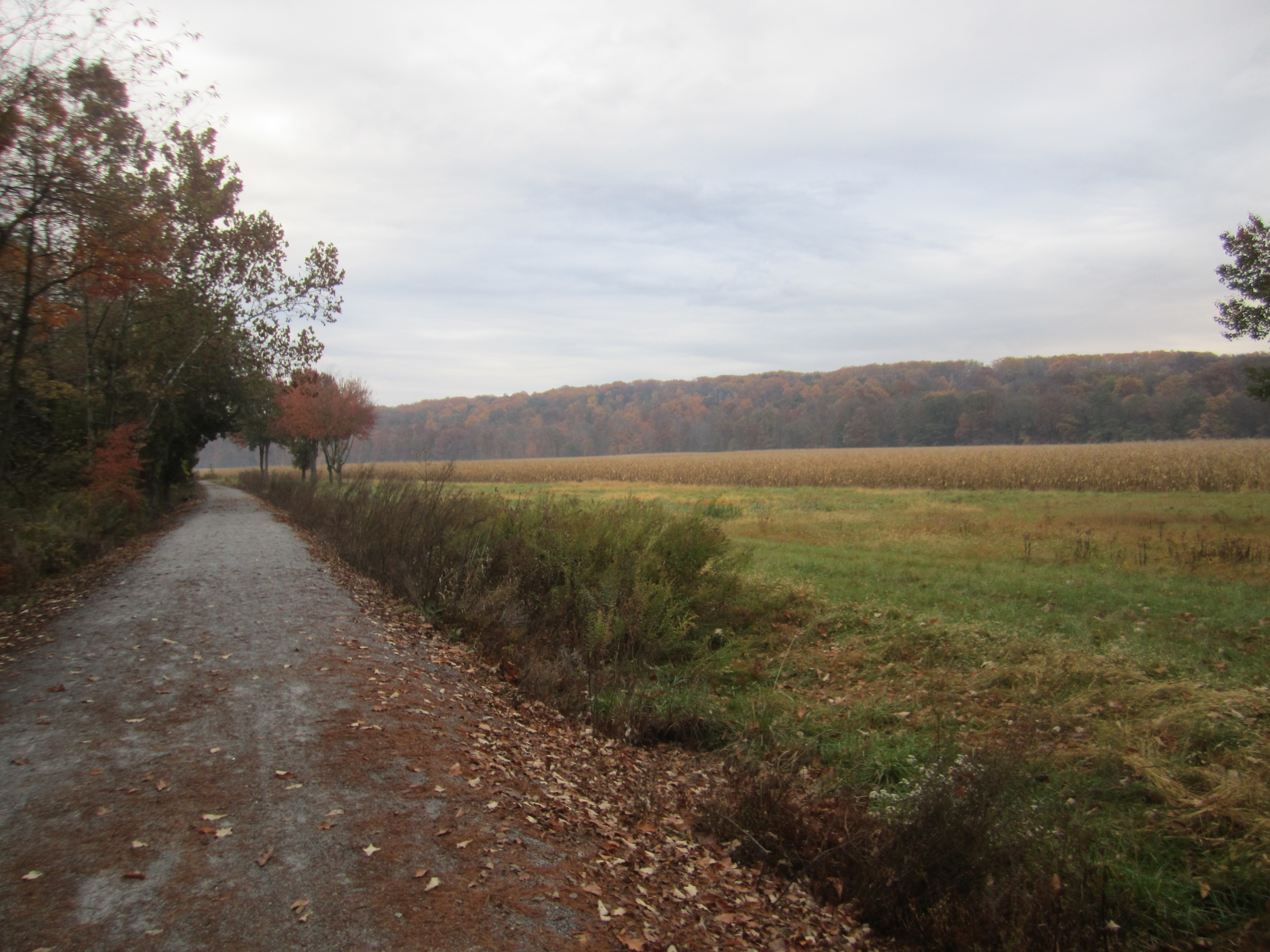
A view from the trail between mile markers 0.0 and 0.5.

The Lancaster Department of Parks and Recreation is responsible for all work and maintenance on the trail, as well as establishing trail regulations aimed to preserve the trail. Current rules as posted of the Lancaster County Department of Parks and Recreation in regard to the Conewago Recreation Trail include.

- Enjoy the trail from dawn to dusk
- The trail is designed for non-motorized vehicles
- Alcoholic beverages are prohibited
- Leave No Trace: carry out what you carry in
- Pets are permitted, but must be kept on a leash
- Remove all horse/pet waste from the trail
- Ride your horse at a walking pace
- Walk/ride single file past other trail users
- Keep right, announce your intent, pass with care
- Discharging firearms from or across trail is prohibited
- Please stay on designated trail

== Community ==
Special events

Various events are held on the Conewago Recreation Trail each year to promote and take advantage of the numerous benefits it bring to the community. The vast majority of events are hosted in coordination with the Lebanon Valley Rail Trail to take advantage of entire length of the combined trails.

Previous events include biking, hiking, and other activities organized by:

• Sierra Club - Lancaster Group(Biking)

• Lebanon Valley Hiking Club (Hiking)

• Harrisburg Bicycle Club (Biking)

• Rails to Trails Bicycle Shop (Biking)
