= Josiah Funck Mansion =

Historic house in Pennsylvania, United States

- U.S. National Register of Historic Places
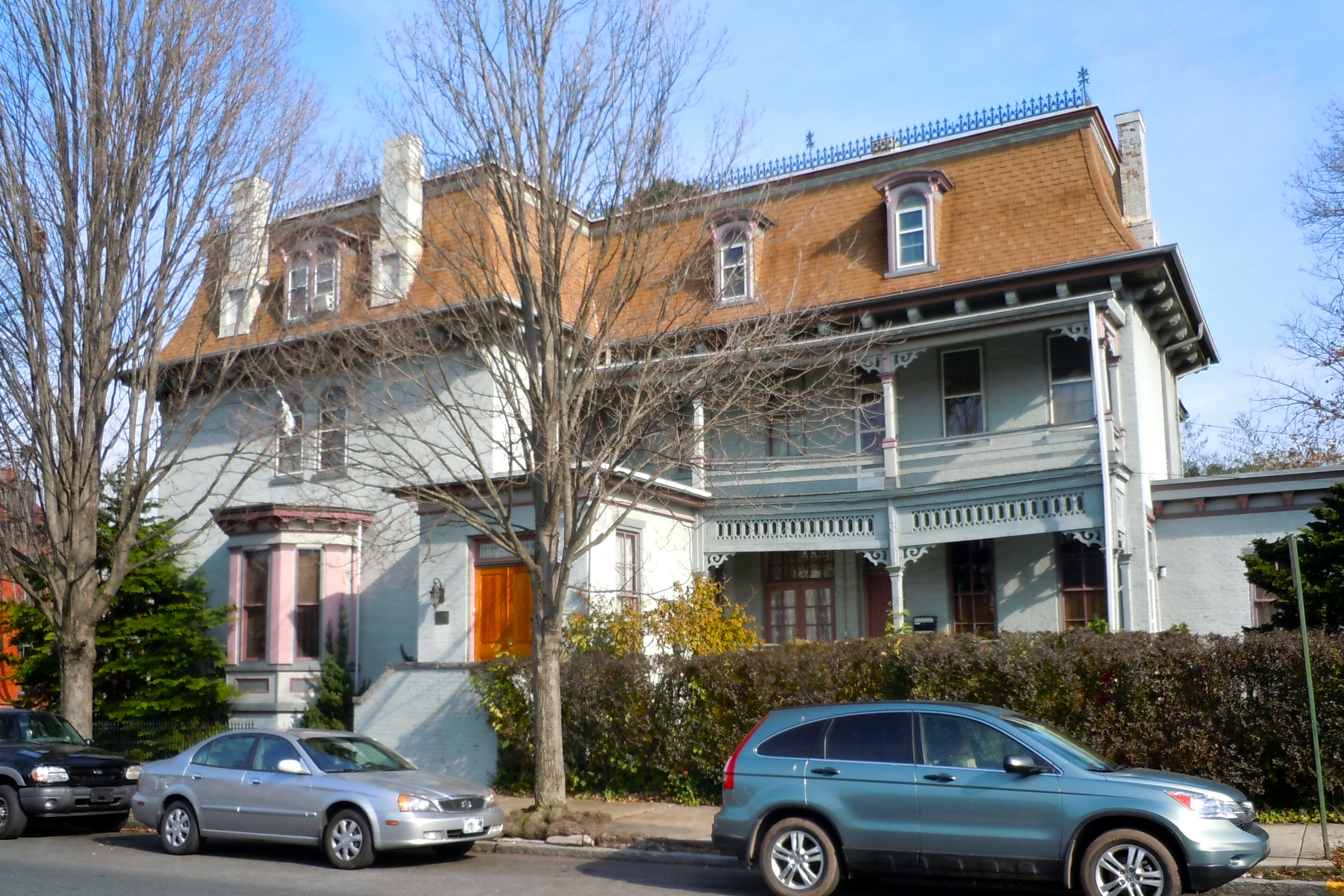
- Josiah Funck Mansion, November 2011

- Location within Pennsylvania Location within the United States
- Location: 450 Cumberland St., Lebanon, Pennsylvania
- Coordinates: 40°20′22″N 76°25′10″W
- Area: 0.6 acres (0.24 ha)
- Built: c. 1855
- Architectural style: Second Empire
- NRHP reference No.: 80003545
- Added to NRHP: January 31, 1980

Josiah Funck Mansion is a historic home located in Lebanon, Lebanon County, Pennsylvania. It was built about 1855, and is a three-story, brick residence with a mansard roof in the Second Empire style. The main section measures 65 feet by 40 feet. Two additions were built sometime after 1932. It features a two-story porch with decorative woodwork.

The home was added to the National Register of Historic Places in 1980.
