= Tabor Reformed Church =

Historic church in Pennsylvania, United States

- U.S. National Register of Historic Places
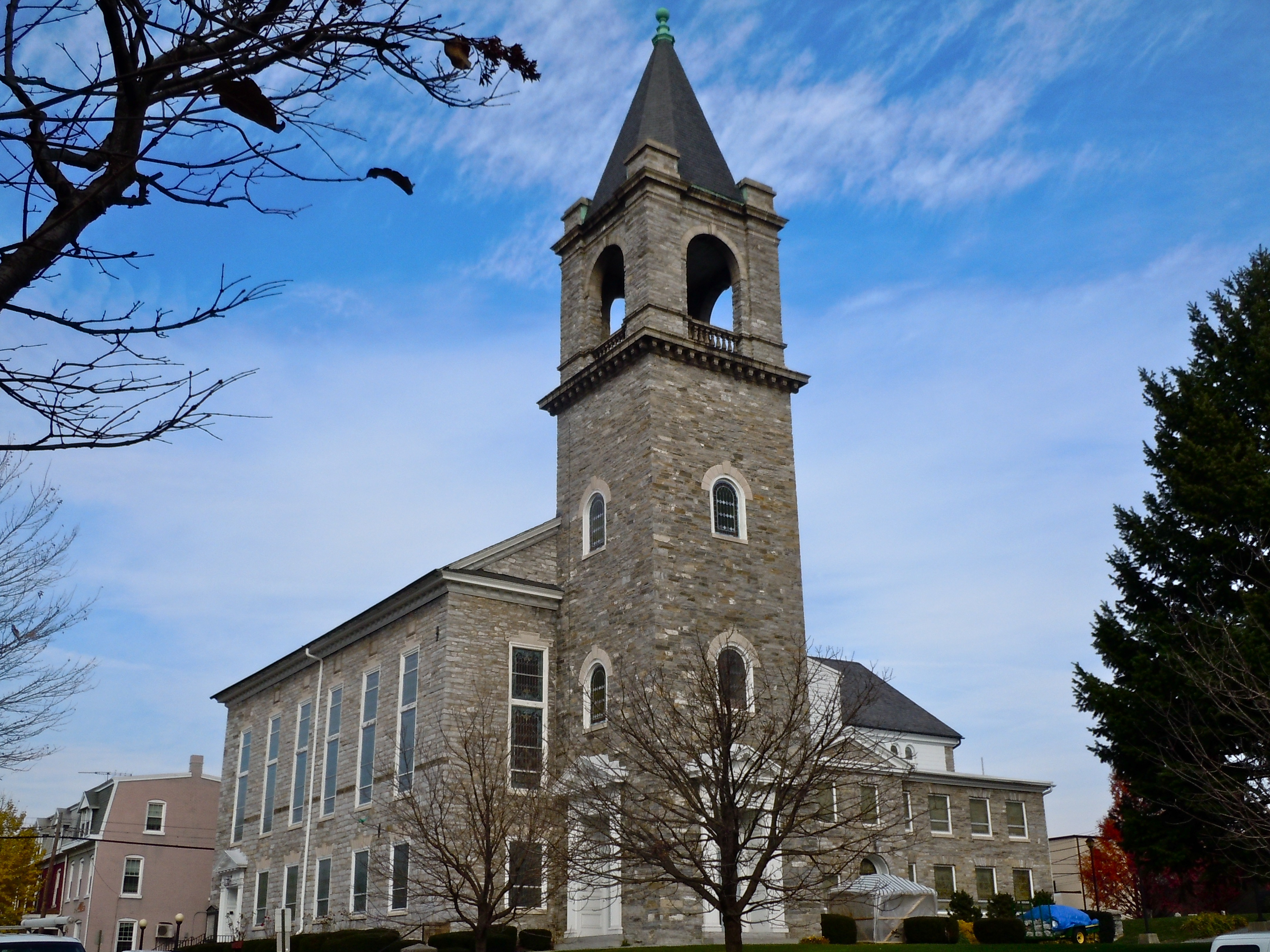
- Tabor United Church of Christ, November 2011

- Location within Pennsylvania Location within the United States
- Location: 10th and Walnut Sts., Lebanon, Pennsylvania
- Coordinates: 40°20′13″N 76°25′39″W
- Area: 1 acre (0.40 ha)
- Built: 1792-1796
- Architect: Uhler, Christopher; MacFaydan, John
- Architectural style: Colonial, Col. Central Pennsylvanian
- NRHP reference No.: 80003547
- Added to NRHP: June 27, 1980

The Tabor Reformed Church, also known as the Tabor United Church of Christ, is an historic Reformed church that is located at 10th and Walnut Streets in Lebanon, Lebanon County, Pennsylvania, United States.

Added to the National Register of Historic Places in 1980, it is currently the home of the LCBC (Lives Changed by Christ) Church.

== History and architectural features ==
This historic structure was built between 1792 and 1796, and is a 2 1/2-story, limestone building that measures forty-two feet by sixty-two feet. It has a four-story stone tower with spire, a slate-covered gable roof, and a chapel that was added in 1914.
