= Lebanon station (Reading Railroad) =

Railway station in Lebanon, Pennsylvania

Lebanon
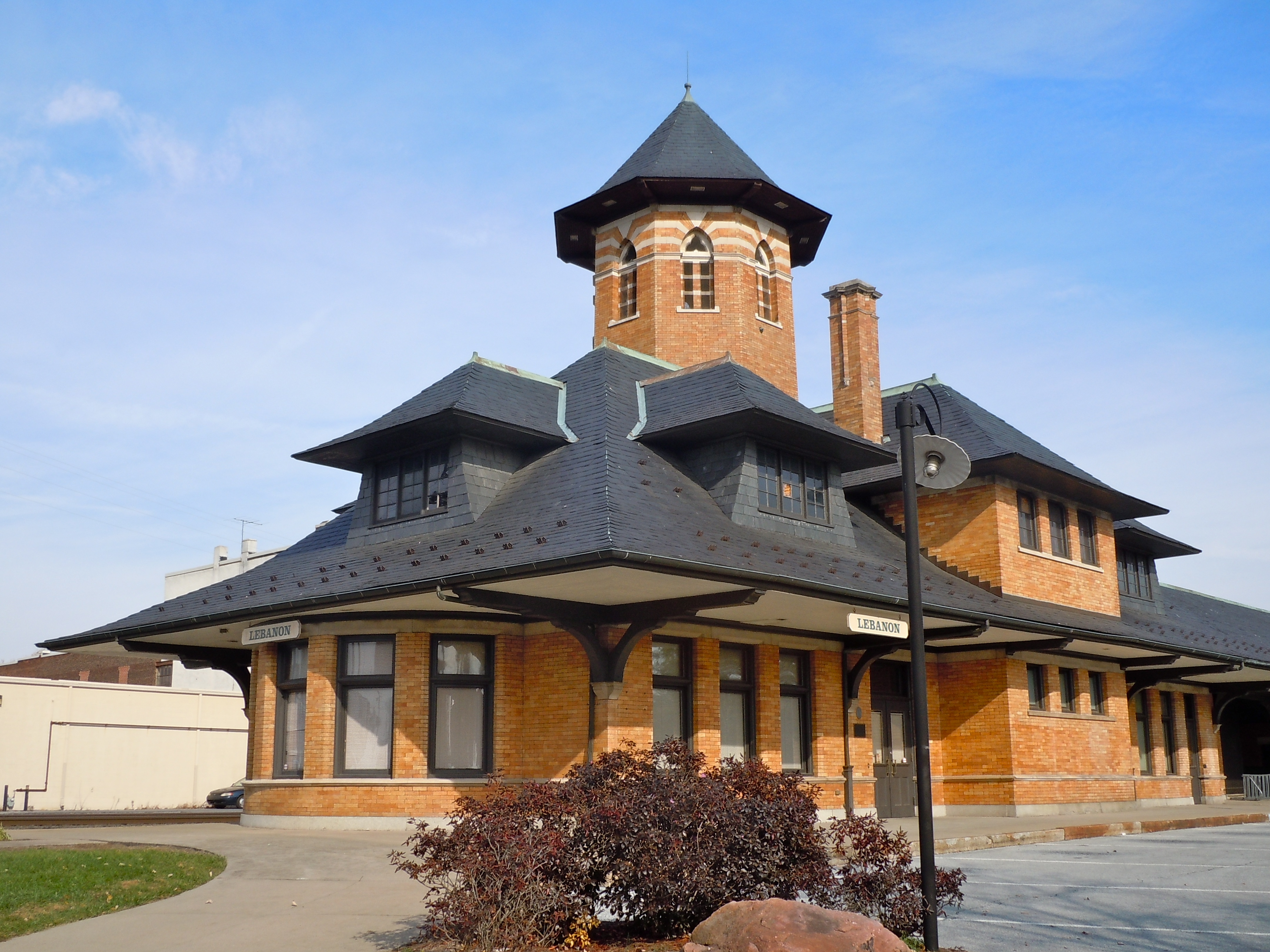
- Lebanon station in June 2006

General information
- Location: North 8th Street, Lebanon, Pennsylvania
- Coordinates: 40°20′35″N 76°25′29″W
- System: Former Reading Railroad station
- Tracks: 2

Construction
- Accessible: No
- Architect: Joseph M. Wilson (Wilson Bros)
- Architectural style: Shingle style

History
- Opened: 1900
- Closed: April 28, 1963

Former services
Preceding station	Reading Railroad	Following station
Front Street toward Harrisburg	Lebanon Valley Branch	Cleona toward Reading
Terminus	Lebanon and Tremont Branch	Westmont toward Tremont
- Reading Railroad Station
- U.S. National Register of Historic Places
- Area: 1 acre (0.40 ha)
- Built: 1900
- NRHP reference No.: 75001647
- Added to NRHP: July 17, 1975
Location

Lebanon station is a historic train station in Lebanon, Pennsylvania. Designed by the Wilson Brothers & Company in the Shingle Style and built by the Reading Company in 1900, it consists of two sections connected by a large overhanging roof. It is located one block north of the Pennsylvania Railroad's Lebanon station.

== Structure ==
The smaller section is a 1 1/2-story, rectangular structure that contained a baggage room, telegraph office, and yardmasters' office. It measures 55.5 by 32.5 feet (16.9 m × 9.9 m). It has a hipped gable roof with bellcast hipped gable dormers and a two-story octagonal tower.

The larger section is a two-story structure measuring approximately 80.5 by 32.5 feet (24.5 m × 9.9 m) and contained men's and women's waiting areas and restrooms. It features a large octagonal tower rising 70–80 feet (21–24 m) above the station and has a hipped gable roof with hipped gable dormers and a semicircular bay.

== History ==
In addition to the Reading, the Cornwall Railroad operated passenger trains at the station until the company discontinued passenger service on January 29, 1929. Passenger service on the Reading ended on April 28, 1963.

The station listed on the National Register of Historic Places as the Reading Railroad Station in 1975.
