= Lebanon station (Pennsylvania Railroad) =

Railway station in Lebanon, Pennsylvania

Lebanon
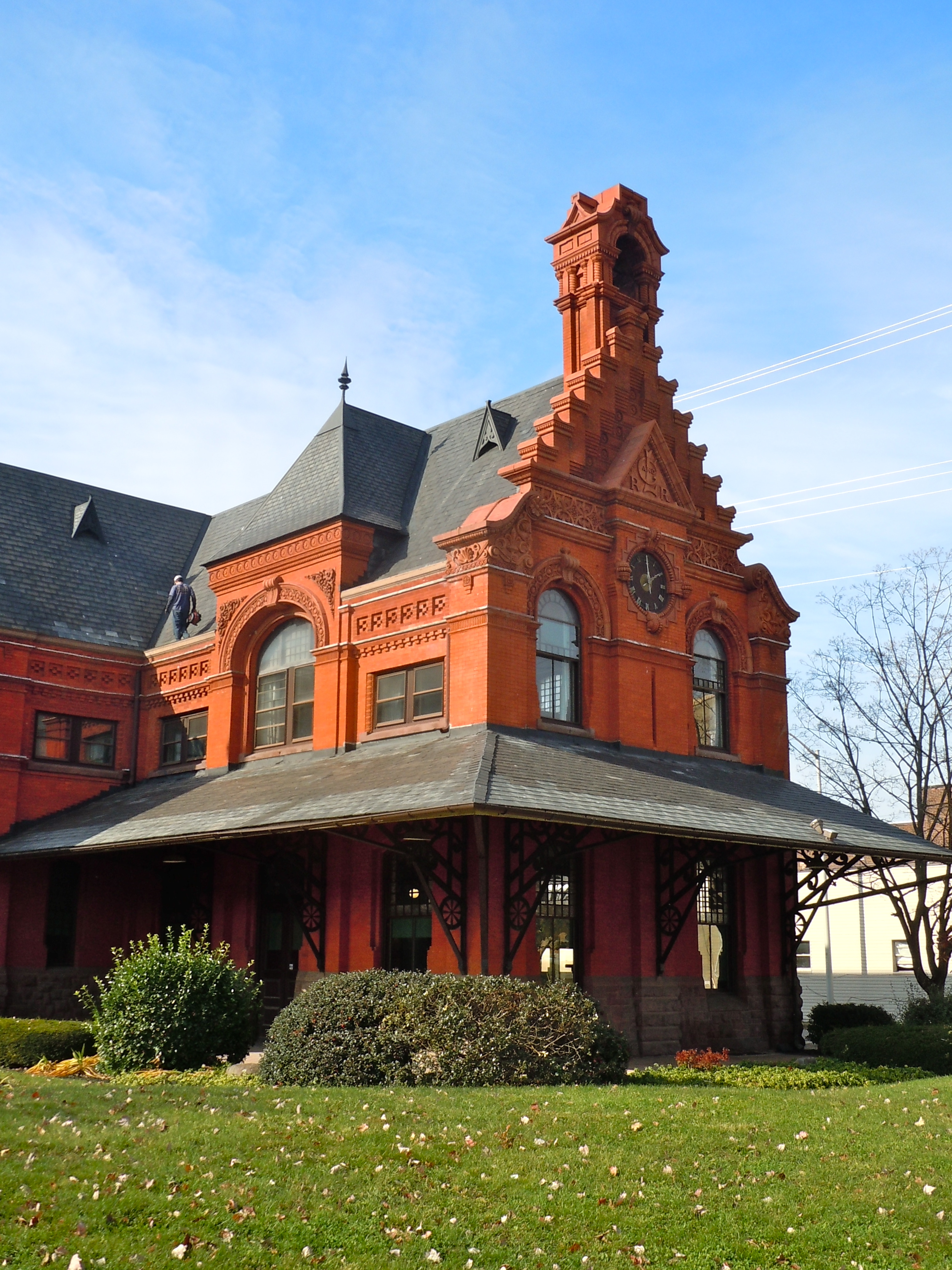
- Cornwall & Lebanon Railroad Station, November 2011

General information
- Location: 161 North 8th Street, Lebanon, Pennsylvania
- Coordinates: 40°20′32″N 76°25′32″W
- Line: Lebanon Branch

Construction
- Architect: George Watson Hewitt
- Architectural style: Late Victorian, High Victorian eclectic

Former services
Preceding station	Pennsylvania Railroad	Following station
Cornwall toward Conewago	Lebanon Branch	Terminus
- Cornwall & Lebanon Railroad Station
- U.S. National Register of Historic Places
- Area: less than one acre
- Built: 1885
- NRHP reference No.: 74001790
- Added to NRHP: December 4, 1974
Location
- Location within Pennsylvania Location within the United States

Lebanon station is an historic railway station in Lebanon, Lebanon County, Pennsylvania, United States.

Situated one block south of the Reading Railroad's Lebanon station, it was added to the National Register of Historic Places in 1974 as the Cornwall & Lebanon Railroad Station.

== History and notable features ==
This historic train station was designed by George Watson Hewitt and built in 1885 by the Cornwall & Lebanon Railroad. It was then expanded in 1912. A two-story, brick, brownstone and terra cotta building designed in an eclectic Victorian style that reflects seventeenth-century Flemish, Romanesque, and Chateauesque influences, it features a broad porch roof with ornamental iron brackets. The Cornwall & Lebanon Railroad opened in 1883, and was acquired by the Pennsylvania Railroad in 1918.

It was added to the National Register of Historic Places in 1974 as the Cornwall & Lebanon Railroad Station. It is located one block south of the Reading Railroad's Lebanon station.

Presently, the Lebanon railway station is being used by Strickler Insurance Agency. The building can be viewed during regular office hours.
