= Lebanon, Pennsylvania =

City in Pennsylvania, US

Lebanon Lebnen (Pennsylvania German)
- City
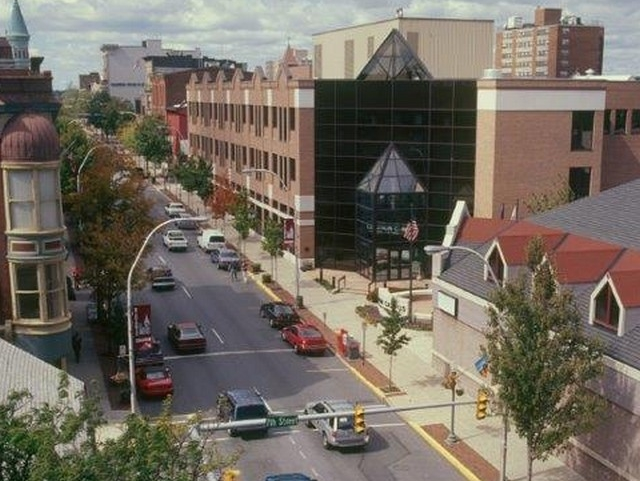
- View down Cumberland Street

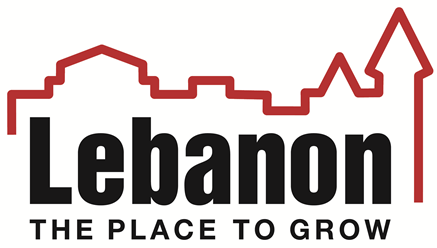
- Logo

- Location of Lebanon in Lebanon County, Pennsylvania (left) and of Lebanon County in Pennsylvania (right)
- Interactive map of Lebanon
- Location of Lebanon in Pennsylvania Lebanon (the United States)
- Coordinates: 40°20′28″N 76°25′22″W
- Country: United States
- State: Pennsylvania
- County: Lebanon
- Settled: 1720
- Incorporated: 1821
- Charter: 1885

Government
  - Mayor: Sherry Capello (R)

Area
  - City: 4.17 sq mi (10.79 km^{2})
  - Land: 4.17 sq mi (10.79 km^{2})
  - Water: 0 sq mi (0.00 km^{2})
  - Urban: 32.7 sq mi (84.7 km^{2})

Population (2020)
  - City: 26,814
  - Density: 6,434.4/sq mi (2,484.32/km^{2})
  - Urban: 78,147
  - Urban density: 9,960/sq mi (3,845/km^{2})
- Time zone: UTC−5 (EST)
  - Summer (DST): UTC−4 (EDT)
- ZIP codes: 17042, 17046
- Area codes: 717 and 223
- FIPS code: 42-42168
- GNIS feature ID: 1215365
- Website: lebanonpa.org

Lebanon (/ˈlɛbənən/ LEB-ən-ən; Pennsylvania German: Lebnen [ˈlɛbnən]) is a city in and the county seat of Lebanon County, Pennsylvania, United States. The population was 26,814 at the 2020 census.

Lebanon was founded by George Steitz in 1740 and was originally named Steitztown.

Lebanon is located 61 miles (98 km) southwest of Allentown, 26 miles (42 km) east of Harrisburg, and 88 miles (142 km) northwest of Philadelphia.

== History ==
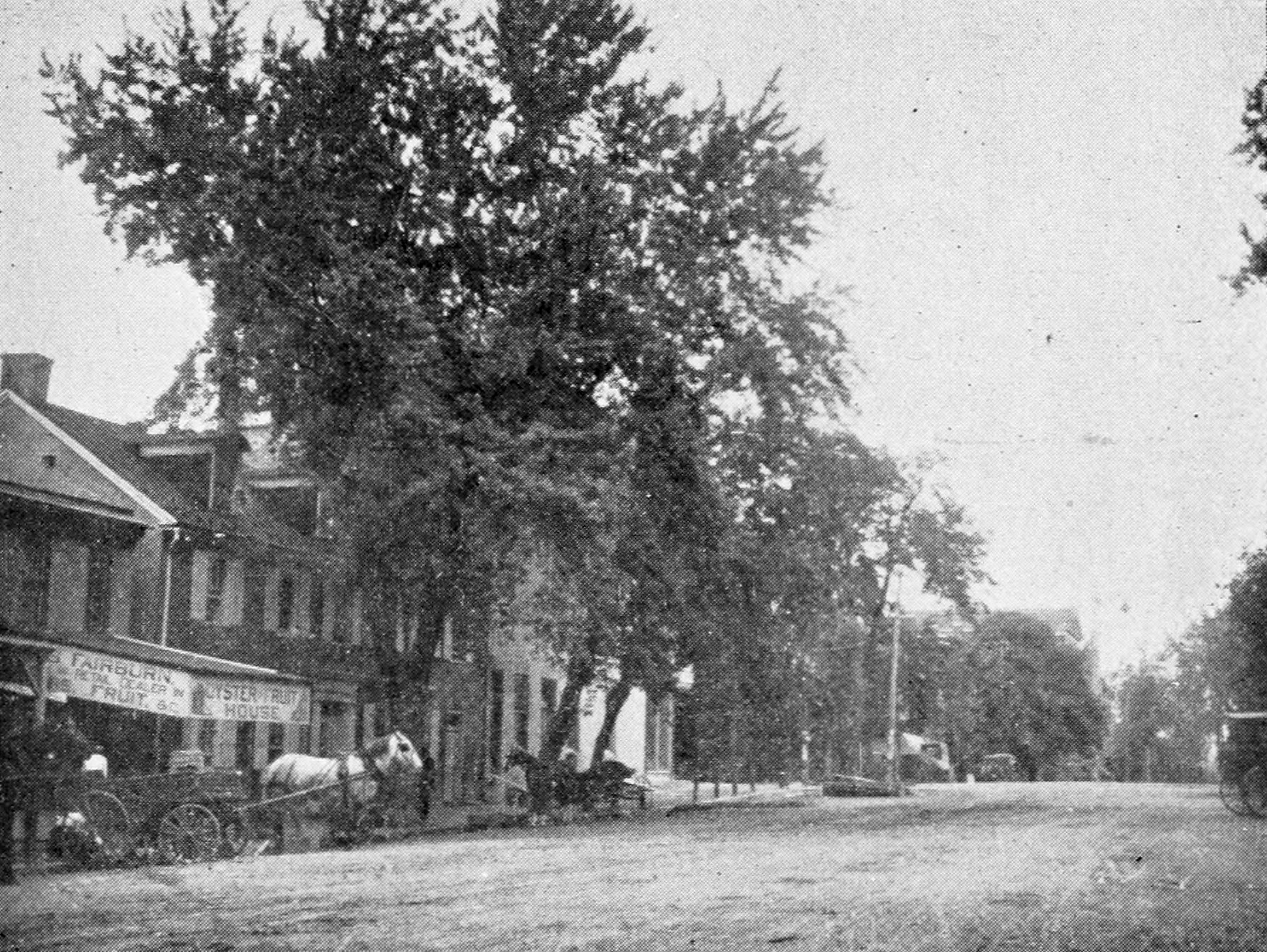
Central Square in Lebanon, 1895

Lebanon was settled by European colonists in 1720, many with the family names of "Steitz" and "Light", along a creek that was then named "Steitz Creek". The Light patriarchs built a fort to protect against Indians and named it "Light's Fort". The town was laid out in 1753, incorporated as a borough on February 20, 1821, and became a city on November 25, 1885. It adopted the commission form of government, consisting of four councilmen and a mayor.

Lebanon bologna was first made here, since before the 1780s. The Union Canal, which operated from 1828 to 1885, flowed through the city's north side. San Giorgio pasta has been manufactured in Lebanon since 1914, and was acquired by nearby Hershey Foods Corporation in 1966. Lebanon was formerly home to a major steel mill operated by Bethlehem Steel.

== Geography ==
According to the U.S. Census Bureau, the city has a total area of 4.2 square miles (11 km^{2}), all land.

Lebanon is bordered to its north and east by North Lebanon Township (4.5 mi), to its south and east by South Lebanon Township (3.22 mi), to its west by West Lebanon Township (1.07 mi), and to its south and west by North Cornwall Township (4.38 mi). The Quittapahilla Creek drains the city westward into the Susquehanna River via the Swatara Creek.

=== Climate ===
Average monthly temperatures in center city Lebanon range from 29.4 °F in January to 74.3 °F in July. The city and vicinity have a hot-summer humid continental climate (Dfa) and the local hardiness zone is 6b.

Climate data for Lebanon, Pennsylvania (1991–2020 normals, extremes 1965–present)
Month	Jan	Feb	Mar	Apr	May	Jun	Jul	Aug	Sep	Oct	Nov	Dec	Year
Record high °F (°C)	70 (21)	79 (26)	84 (29)	91 (33)	95 (35)	100 (38)	103 (39)	98 (37)	98 (37)	90 (32)	82 (28)	75 (24)	103 (39)
Mean daily maximum °F (°C)	37.0 (2.8)	40.4 (4.7)	49.4 (9.7)	62.0 (16.7)	71.9 (22.2)	80.0 (26.7)	84.4 (29.1)	82.4 (28.0)	75.6 (24.2)	64.1 (17.8)	52.3 (11.3)	41.7 (5.4)	61.8 (16.6)
Daily mean °F (°C)	29.5 (−1.4)	31.9 (−0.1)	40.1 (4.5)	51.1 (10.6)	61.2 (16.2)	69.9 (21.1)	74.3 (23.5)	72.5 (22.5)	65.5 (18.6)	54.0 (12.2)	43.2 (6.2)	34.3 (1.3)	52.3 (11.3)
Mean daily minimum °F (°C)	22.0 (−5.6)	23.4 (−4.8)	30.7 (−0.7)	40.3 (4.6)	50.6 (10.3)	59.7 (15.4)	64.2 (17.9)	62.6 (17.0)	55.4 (13.0)	43.9 (6.6)	34.0 (1.1)	26.9 (−2.8)	42.8 (6.0)
Record low °F (°C)	−22 (−30)	−12 (−24)	−4 (−20)	18 (−8)	27 (−3)	37 (3)	44 (7)	38 (3)	30 (−1)	18 (−8)	9 (−13)	−4 (−20)	−22 (−30)
Average precipitation inches (mm)	3.06 (78)	2.55 (65)	3.60 (91)	3.72 (94)	3.99 (101)	4.49 (114)	4.85 (123)	4.63 (118)	4.63 (118)	4.10 (104)	3.21 (82)	3.57 (91)	46.40 (1,179)
Average snowfall inches (cm)	6.8 (17)	7.8 (20)	4.2 (11)	0.4 (1.0)	0.0 (0.0)	0.0 (0.0)	0.0 (0.0)	0.0 (0.0)	0.0 (0.0)	0.3 (0.76)	0.5 (1.3)	4.0 (10)	24.0 (61)
Average precipitation days (≥ 0.01 in)	9.9	9.0	10.5	12.0	12.6	11.4	10.7	10.1	9.5	10.0	9.2	10.4	125.3
Average snowy days (≥ 0.1 in)	3.4	3.4	1.4	0.2	0.0	0.0	0.0	0.0	0.0	0.0	0.4	1.7	10.5
Source: NOAA

== Demographics ==
Historical population
Census	Pop.	Note	%±
1790	960		—
1800	1,439		49.9%
1810	1,434		−0.3%
1820	1,437		0.2%
1830	1,826		27.1%
1840	1,860		1.9%
1850	2,184		17.4%
1860	4,449		103.7%
1870	6,727		51.2%
1880	8,778		30.5%
1890	14,664		67.1%
1900	17,628		20.2%
1910	19,240		9.1%
1920	24,643		28.1%
1930	25,561		3.7%
1940	27,206		6.4%
1950	28,156		3.5%
1960	30,045		6.7%
1970	28,572		−4.9%
1980	25,711		−10.0%
1990	24,800		−3.5%
2000	24,461		−1.4%
2010	25,477		4.2%
2020	26,814		5.2%

=== 2020 census ===
As of the 2020 census, Lebanon had a population of 26,814 and a median age of 35.7 years. 25.8% of residents were under the age of 18 and 15.1% of residents were 65 years of age or older.

For every 100 females there were 96.0 males, and for every 100 females age 18 and over there were 93.3 males age 18 and over.

100.0% of residents lived in urban areas, while 0.0% lived in rural areas.

There were 10,566 households in Lebanon, of which 32.0% had children under the age of 18 living in them. Of all households, 31.3% were married-couple households, 23.7% were households with a male householder and no spouse or partner present, and 33.9% were households with a female householder and no spouse or partner present. About 33.3% of all households were made up of individuals and 14.0% had someone living alone who was 65 years of age or older.

There were 11,426 housing units, of which 7.5% were vacant. The homeowner vacancy rate was 1.6% and the rental vacancy rate was 6.0%.

Racial composition as of the 2020 census
Race	Number	Percent
White	14,794	55.2%
Black or African American	1,434	5.3%
American Indian and Alaska Native	135	0.5%
Asian	242	0.9%
Native Hawaiian and Other Pacific Islander	31	0.1%
Some other race	6,150	22.9%
Two or more races	4,028	15.0%
Hispanic or Latino (of any race)	12,380	46.2%

=== 2000 census ===
As of the census of 2000, there were 24,461 people, 10,266 households, and 6,056 families residing in the city. The population density was 5,844.8 inhabitants per square mile (2,256.7/km^{2}). There were 11,220 housing units at an average density of 2,681.0 per square mile (1,035.1/km^{2}). The racial makeup of the city was 85.50% White, 3.23% African American, 0.28% Native American, 1.02% Asian, 0.10% Pacific Islander, 8.11% from other races, and 1.76% from two or more races. Hispanic or Latino of any race were 16.43% of the population.

There were 10,266 households, out of which 28.4% had children under the age of 18 living with them, 38.7% were married couples living together, 15.0% had a female householder with no husband present, and 41.0% were non-families. 35.4% of all households were made up of individuals, and 15.3% had someone living alone who was 65 years of age or older. The average household size was 2.32 and the average family size was 3.00.

In the city, the population was spread out, with 25.0% under the age of 18, 8.4% from 18 to 24, 29.5% from 25 to 44, 20.5% from 45 to 64, and 16.6% who were 65 years of age or older. The median age was 36 years. For every 100 females, there were 94.1 males. For every 100 females age 18 and over, there were 90.8 males.

The median income for a household in the city was $27,259, and the median income for a family was $34,045. Males had a median income of $26,957 versus $20,162 for females. The per capita income for the city was $15,584. About 12.8% of families and 16.2% of the population were below the poverty line, including 24.7% of those under age 18 and 10.5% of those age 65 or over.

== Education ==
Public education in the city of Lebanon and West Lebanon Township is provided by the Lebanon School District. There are five elementary schools in the district along with Lebanon Middle School and Lebanon High School. Beginning with the 2024-25 school year the middle school will be replaced by an intermediate school (5th & 6th grades) and a junior high school (7th & 8th Grades). Nearby private institutions include Blue Mountain Christian School, New Covenant Christian School and Lebanon Christian Academy. All three private institutions have a varsity sports department and an elementary, junior high, and senior high. Students in Lebanon School District also may attend the Lebanon County Career and Technology Center. The city is home to Harrisburg Area Community College's Lebanon Campus.

== Culture ==
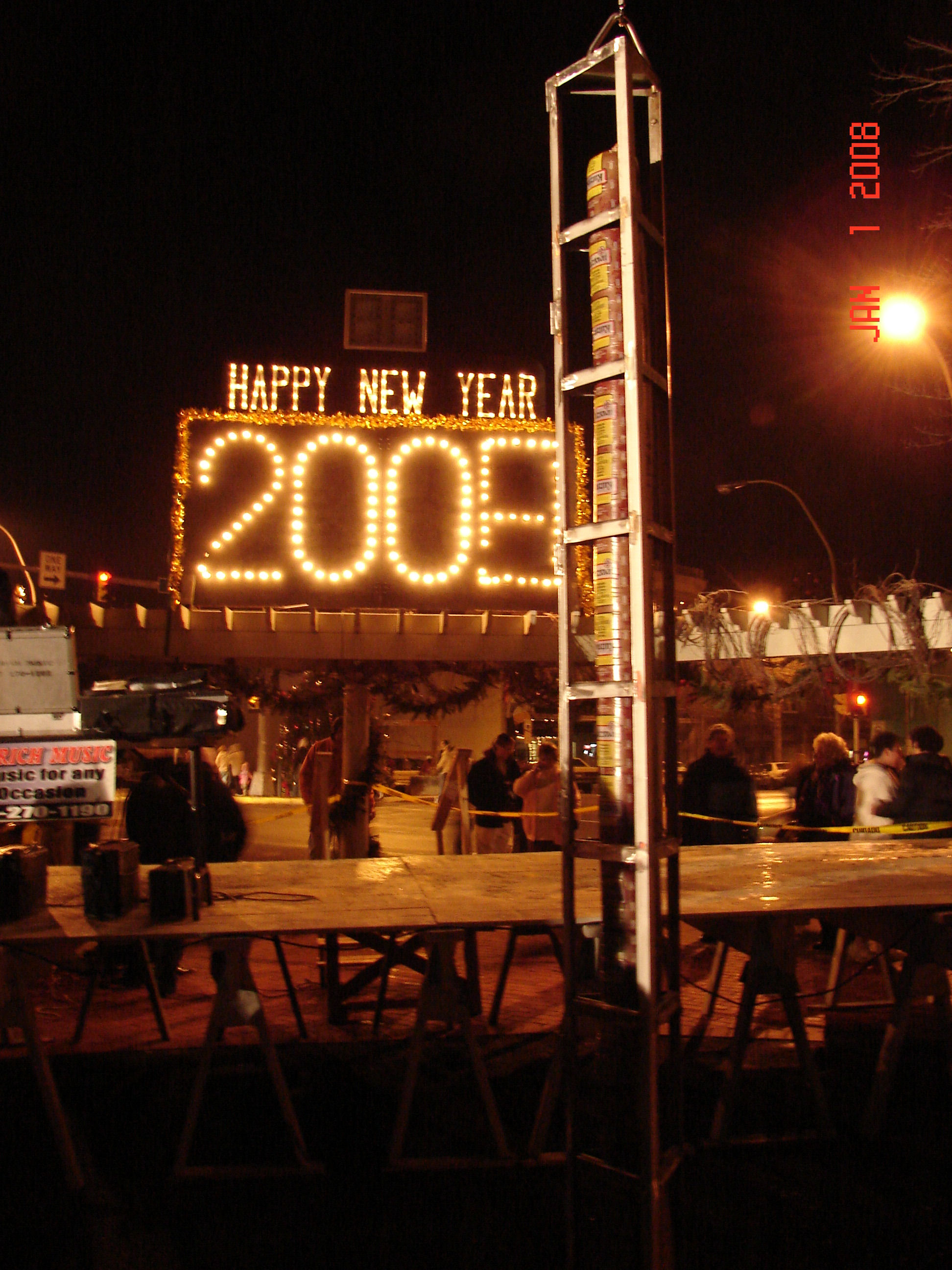
Lebanon's 12 ft, 150 pound New Year's Eve bologna

Lebanon, Pennsylvania is thought to be named after the West Asian nation of Lebanon, however, locals consistently pronounce the Pennsylvania city's name /ˈlɛbənən/ ("Leb-a-nin") and many shorten it to two syllables—"Leb-nin" or even "Lep-nin." The latter is particularly identified with Pennsylvania Dutch heritage.

An infamous 1878 murder near Fort Indiantown Gap resulted in a trial of six defendants who all had blue eyes. They were given the moniker the Blue-eyed Six by a newspaper reporter who attended the trial, held in the Lebanon county courthouse. Five of the six defendants were hanged at the county jail. The trial received worldwide publicity and provided inspiration to Arthur Conan Doyle in writing the Sherlock Holmes short story "The Red-Headed League" (1891).

At one point in history the Lebanon County courthouse and jail became the home of the popular Lebanon Farmers Market. After a time as a textile manufacturer, the market returned to the original 30,000 square foot Market House on South 8th street in 2003.

Lebanon is one of several Pennsylvania towns to drop or raise a unique item at midnight on New Year's Eve. Godshall's Quality Meats, owners of Weaver's Famous Lebanon Bologna, donates a 150-pound (68 kg) Lebanon bologna for the annual festivity. It is encased in a metal frame and suspended from a fire department ladder truck, and donated to a local rescue mission after the celebration.

In December 2008, the TV show Dirty Jobs, hosted by Mike Rowe, visited the Seltzer's Smokehouse Meats to film production of Lebanon bologna. In 2008 the show featured the Wertz Candy Shop.

In 2010, an independent film drama Lebanon, PA was made. The film was set in Lebanon and some scenes were filmed in the city and surrounding county.

== Points of interest ==
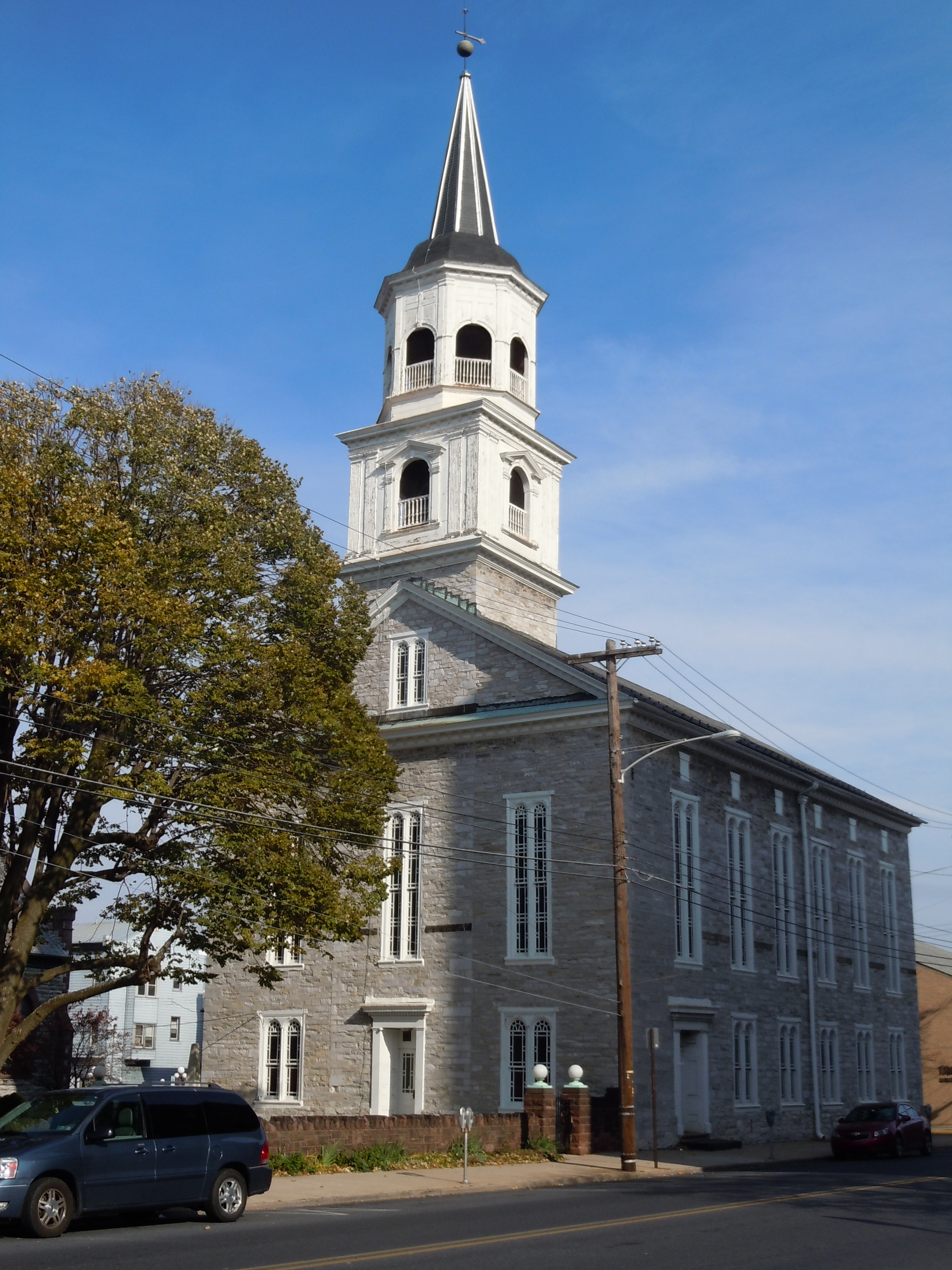
Salem Evangelical Lutheran Church

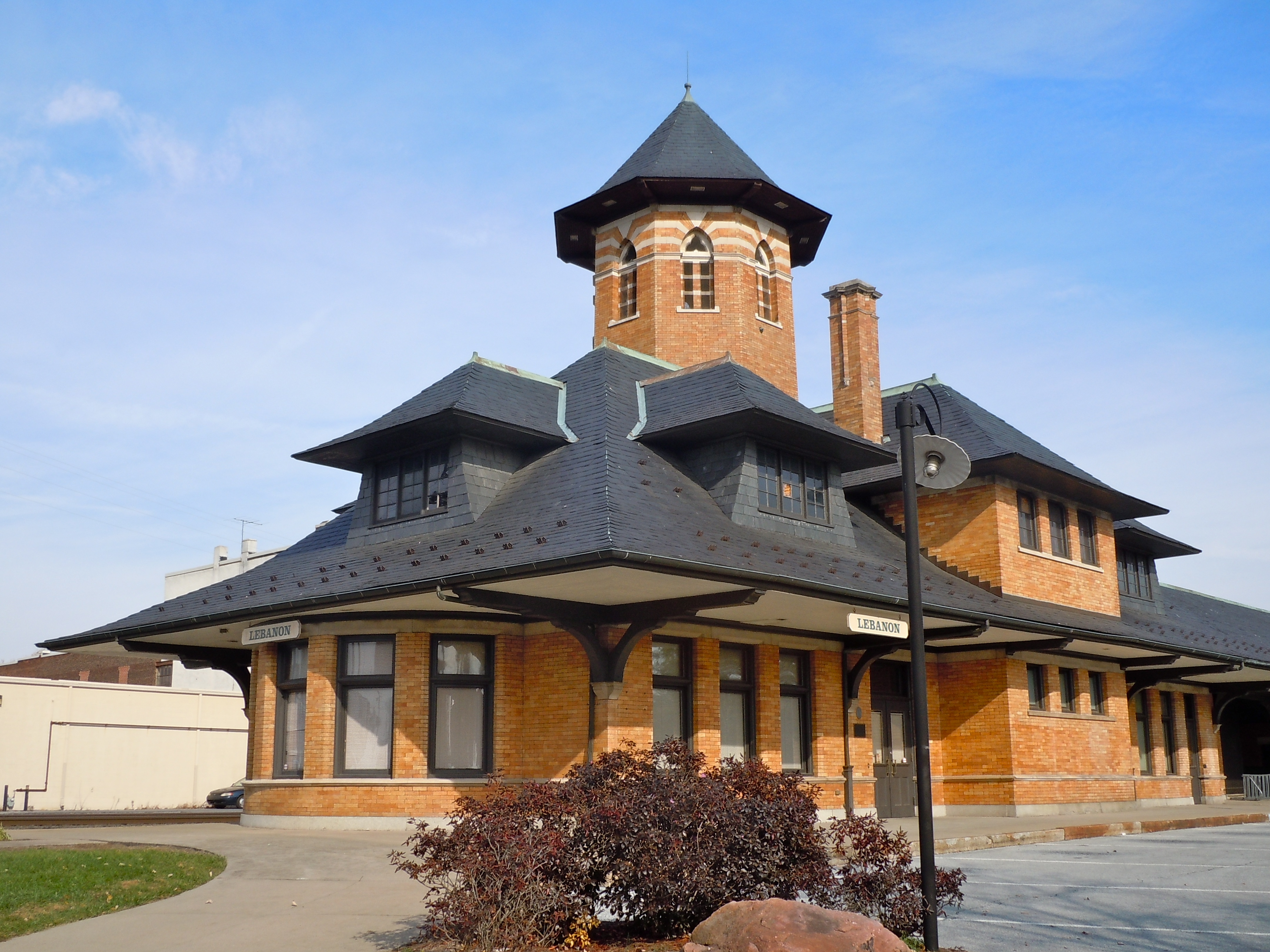
The Former Reading Railroad station on Eighth Street

Local points of interest listed on the National Register of Historic Places include:

- Chestnut Street Log House
- Cornwall & Lebanon Railroad Station
- Josiah Funck Mansion
- Reading Railroad Station
- Salem Evangelical Lutheran Church
- St. Lukes Episcopal Church
- Tabor Reformed Church
- Union Canal Tunnel Park

== Notable people ==
- Thomas Albert, composer
- Jaynne Bittner (née Jaynne Berrier), pitcher All-American Girls Professional Baseball League
- Sam Bowie, NBA center
- Robert A. Bryan, former English literature scholar
- James Buchanan, 15th President of the United States, and first member of the Lebanon County Bar Association
- Matt Busch, illustrator of Star Wars, filmmaker
- Robert Coleman (industrialist), iron barron and politician
- Kerry Collins, former NFL quarterback
- Jamie Lynn Corkish, sport shooter and gold medalist at the 2012 Summer Olympics
- David Edgerton, co-founder of Burger King
- Derek Fisher, former MLB outfielder
- Jacob G. Francis, founder of Elizabethtown College
- Bobby Gerhart, NASCAR/ARCA driver
- Betty Harte, silent-film actress
- Randal Kleiser, American film director, producer and screenwriter
- Todd Klick, American writer
- Kyle Martel, racing driver
- Lois K. Miller (1945–1999), entomologist
- Jared Odrick, former NFL defensive end for the Miami Dolphins and Jacksonville Jaguars
- C. Henry Orth, Pennsylvania State Senator
- Alexander Patch, U.S. Army general
- Joseph D. Patch, U.S. Army major general
- Cyrus Patschke, racing driver
- Neil Pierre, soccer player
- Nelson Pierre, soccer player
- Frank Reich, former NFL quarterback and former head coach of the Carolina Panthers and Indianapolis Colts
- George S. Rentz, World War II Navy Cross recipient and United States Navy Chaplain
- Dick Shiner, former NFL quarterback
- Dick Tobias, hall of fame auto racing driver
