= National Register of Historic Places listings in Lebanon County, Pennsylvania =

Location of Lebanon County in Pennsylvania

This is a list of the National Register of Historic Places listings in Lebanon County, Pennsylvania.

This is intended to be a complete list of the properties and districts on the National Register of Historic Places in Lebanon County, Pennsylvania, United States. The locations of National Register properties and districts for which the latitude and longitude coordinates are included below, may be seen in a map.

There are 31 properties and districts listed on the National Register in the county, and one former listing. Four sites are further designated as National Historic Landmarks.

This National Park Service list is complete through NPS recent listings posted March 14, 2025.

== Current listings ==
	Name on the Register	Image	Date listed	Location	Municipality	Description
1	Alden Villa	Alden Villa	April 20, 2011 (#11000203)	1012 Alden Way; 40°16′25″N 76°25′48″W	Cornwall	
2	Annville Historic District	Annville Historic District	April 30, 1979 (#79002285)	Roughly bounded by the Quittapahilla Creek and Lebanon, Saylor, and Marshall Streets in Annville; 40°19′42″N 76°30′58″W	Annville Township	
3	Biever House	Biever House	February 14, 1978 (#78002423)	49 South White Oak Street in Annville; 40°19′41″N 76°30′56″W	Annville Township	
4	Bindnagles Evangelical Lutheran Church	Bindnagles Evangelical Lutheran Church	July 7, 1975 (#75001651)	North of Palmyra at the junction of Legislative Route 38003 and Township 330; 40°20′38″N 76°37′01″W	North Londonderry Township	
5	Bomberger's Distillery	Bomberger's Distillery	June 26, 1975 (#75001649)	7 miles (11 km) southwest of Newmanstown off Pennsylvania Route 501; 40°16′37″N 76°19′13″W	Heidelberg Township	
6	Brendle Farms	Brendle Farms	July 24, 1972 (#72001130)	Junction of Pennsylvania Routes 501 and 897; 40°17′45″N 76°18′12″W	Schaefferstown	
7	Chestnut Street Log House	Chestnut Street Log House	November 20, 1978 (#78002424)	1110 Chestnut Street; 40°20′15″N 76°25′46″W	Lebanon	
8	Colebrook Iron Master's House	Colebrook Iron Master's House	June 28, 2010 (#10000405)	5200 Elizabethtown Rd. 40°14′21″N 76°30′46″W	South Londonderry Township	
9	Cornwall & Lebanon Railroad Station	Cornwall & Lebanon Railroad Station	December 4, 1974 (#74001790)	161 North 8th Street; 40°20′32″N 76°25′32″W	Lebanon	
10	Cornwall Iron Furnace	Cornwall Iron Furnace	November 13, 1966 (#66000671)	Rexmont Road and Boyd Street; 40°16′07″N 76°24′27″W	Cornwall	
11	Philip Erpff House	Philip Erpff House	November 20, 1979 (#79002287)	South Market Street; 40°17′47″N 76°17′37″W	Schaefferstown	
12	Josiah Funck Mansion	Josiah Funck Mansion	January 31, 1980 (#80003545)	450 Cumberland Street; 40°20′22″N 76°25′10″W	Lebanon	
13	Gloninger Estate	Gloninger Estate	December 10, 1980 (#80003546)	2511 West Oak Street, southwest of Lebanon; 40°19′25″N 76°27′12″W	North Cornwall Township	
14	House of Miller at Millbach	House of Miller at Millbach	April 23, 1973 (#73001640)	Southwest of Newmanstown off Pennsylvania Route 419; 40°19′49″N 76°14′19″W	Millcreek Township	
15	Landis Shoe Company Building	Landis Shoe Company Building	August 29, 1980 (#80003550)	North Chestnut and East Broad Streets; 40°18′37″N 76°35′50″W	Palmyra	
16	Lebanon Veterans Administration Hospital Historic District	Lebanon Veterans Administration Hospital Historic District	July 23, 2013 (#13000539)	1700 South Lincoln Avenue; 40°19′04″N 76°23′52″W	South Lebanon Township	
17	Isaac Meier Homestead	Isaac Meier Homestead	April 2, 1973 (#73001639)	5200 South College Street; 40°22′09″N 76°18′19″W	Myerstown	
18	Pennsylvania Chautauqua Historic District	Pennsylvania Chautauqua Historic District	August 18, 2015 (#15000535)	Roughly bounded by State Game Lands, Pennsylvania Route 117, Pinch Rd., and Lancaster and Pennsylvania Aves. 40°14′50″N 76°28′18″W	Mount Gretna	
19	Mt. Gretna Campmeeting Historic District	Mt. Gretna Campmeeting Historic District	September 4, 2012 (#12000608)	Roughly bounded by PA 117, Pinch Rd., Bell Ave., & 1st St. (West Cornwall Township); 40°14′56″N 76°28′05″W	Mount Gretna Heights	
20	Reading Railroad Station	Reading Railroad Station	July 17, 1975 (#75001647)	North 8th Street; 40°20′35″N 76°25′29″W	Lebanon	
21	Rex House	Rex House	August 11, 1980 (#80003551)	North Market Street; 40°17′53″N 76°17′36″W	Schaefferstown	
22	St. Lukes Episcopal Church	St. Lukes Episcopal Church	September 4, 1974 (#74001791)	6th and Chestnut Streets; 40°20′17″N 76°25′16″W	Lebanon	
23	Salem Evangelical Lutheran Church	Salem Evangelical Lutheran Church	June 28, 2010 (#10000402)	119 N Eighth St. 40°20′28″N 76°25′31″W	Lebanon	
24	Schaeffer House	Schaeffer House	July 25, 2011 (#11000630)	213 S. Carpenter St. 40°17′47″N 76°18′01″W	Schaefferstown	
25	Schaefferstown Historic District		November 3, 2023 (#100009511)	Roughly bounded by SR 501; Oak Street; Locust Street; Schaefferstown Cemetery; High Street; Fountain Park; the second blocks of S. Market, S. Lancaster, and S. Carpenter streets and the rear parcel lines of properties on the south side of Heidelberg Avenue; 40°17′53″N 76°17′39″W	Schaefferstown	
25	Dr. B. Stauffer House	Dr. B. Stauffer House	June 22, 1979 (#79002286)	2750 Horseshoe Pike in Campbelltown; 40°16′37″N 76°35′28″W	South Londonderry Township	
26	Tabor Reformed Church	Tabor Reformed Church	June 27, 1980 (#80003547)	10th and Walnut Streets; 40°20′13″N 76°25′39″W	Lebanon	
27	Tulpehocken Manor Plantation	Tulpehocken Manor Plantation	May 12, 1975 (#75001648)	2 miles (3.2 km) west of Myerstown on U.S. Route 422; 40°21′48″N 76°20′25″W	Jackson Township	
28	Union Canal Tunnel	Union Canal Tunnel	October 1, 1974 (#74001792)	West of Lebanon off Pennsylvania Route 72; 40°20′58″N 76°27′42″W	North Lebanon Township	
29	Waterville Bridge	Waterville Bridge	November 14, 1988 (#88002171)	Appalachian Trail over Swatara Creek in Swatara State Park; 40°28′49″N 76°31′55″W	Union Township	
30	Heinrich Zeller House	Heinrich Zeller House	May 12, 1975 (#75001650)	West of Newmanstown off Pennsylvania Route 419; 40°20′57″N 76°13′33″W	Millcreek Township	

== Former listings ==
	Name on the Register	Image	Date listed	Date removed	Location	City or town	Description
1	John Immel House	John Immel House	April 17, 1980 (#80003548)	December 16, 2022	East of Myerstown on Flanagan Road; 40°22′08″N 76°16′21″W	Jackson Township	

== See also ==
- List of National Historic Landmarks in Pennsylvania
- National Register of Historic Places listings in Pennsylvania
- List of Pennsylvania state historical markers in Lebanon County
