= Eastern Lebanon County High School =

Public high school in Pennsylvania, United States

Coordinates: 40.345°N 76.288°W

ELCO High School
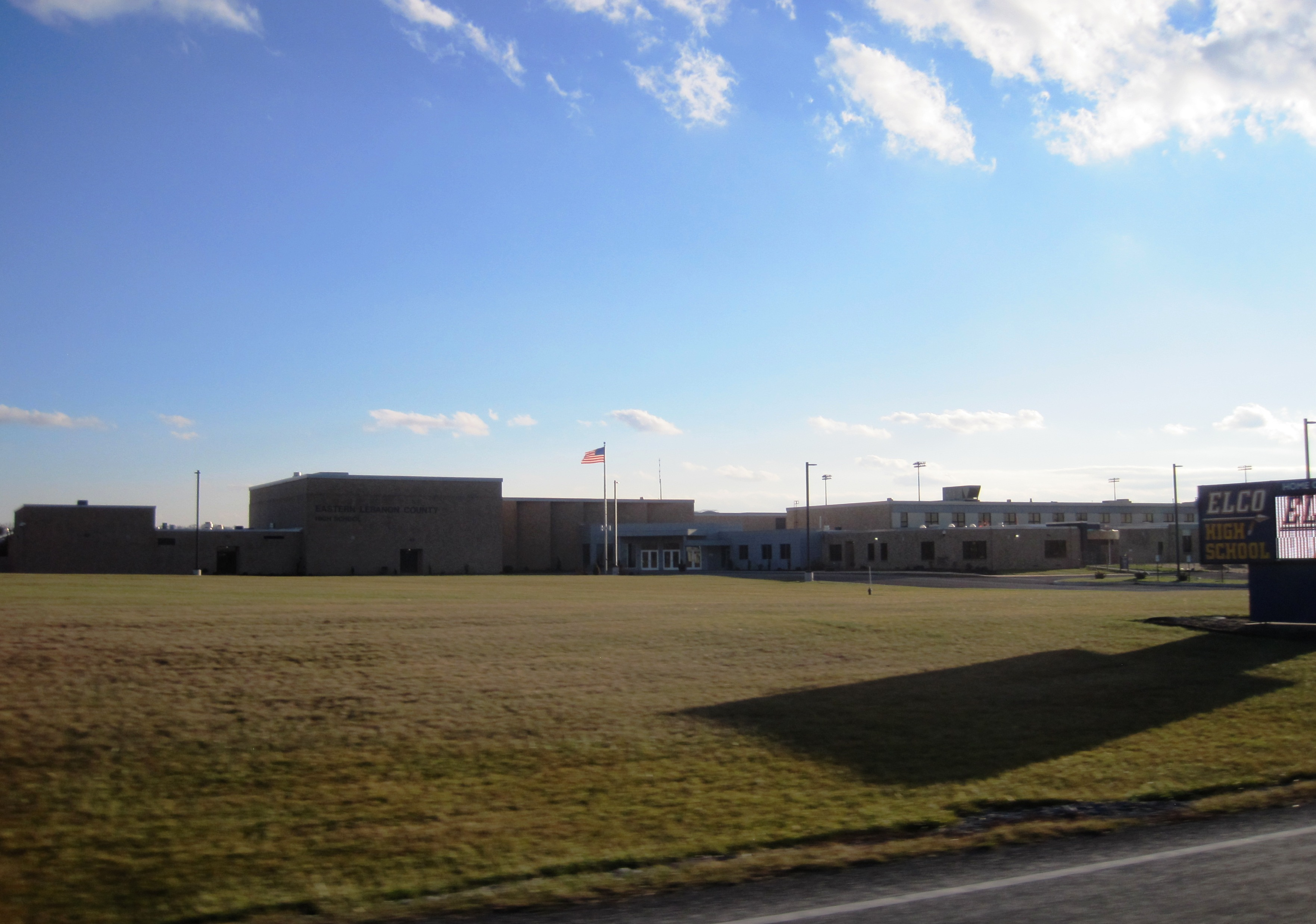

Location
- 180 Elco Drive; Myerstown, Lebanon County, Pennsylvania 17067; United States

Information
- Type: Public
- Motto: Expect Excellence
- School district: Eastern Lebanon County School District
- Principal: Jen Haas
- Teaching staff: 51.65 (FTE)
- Enrollment: 752 (2023–2024)
- Student to teacher ratio: 14.56
- Campus: Rural
- Colors: Blue and gold
- Fight song: ELCO RAIDER BLUE & GOLD
- Athletics conference: PIAA Class AAAA, L-L Section 4
- Mascot: Chief Spear-It
- Nickname: Raiders
- Website: www.elcosd.org

Eastern Lebanon County High School, referred to as ELCO High School, is located in Myerstown, Pennsylvania. It is a four-year high school with a total student enrollment of 747. The high-school campus also contains the district's intermediate and middle schools.

== General information ==
Eastern Lebanon County High School is a rural high school serving the communities of Myerstown, Pennsylvania, Schaefferstown, Pennsylvania, Newmanstown, Pennsylvania, Richland, Pennsylvania, Kleinfeltersville, Pennsylvania and Jackson Township, Lebanon County, Pennsylvania. The current principal is Ms. Jennifer Haas.

== Extracurricular Activities ==
ELCO High School's athletic programs include baseball, basketball, bowling, cheerleading, cross country, field hockey, football, golf, soccer, softball, tennis, track & field, volleyball and wrestling. The school also offers chorus and band opportunities.

== Graduation Statistics ==
For the 2020-2021 school year, 167 out of 183 eligible students graduated for a graduation rate of 91.26% (87.91% for males, 94.57% for females). Of those 167 graduating students, 96 indicated a pursuit of Postsecondary Education (57.49%).

Students from the 2019 graduating cohort took both the SAT and the ACT (test) standardized tests widely used for college admissions in the United States. With respect to the SAT, 87 of such students took the exam for an average math score of 530.7, an average reading score of 543.5 and an average composite score of 1074.2. Further, 11 students took the ACT for an average english score of 21, reading score of 23, math score of 22, science score of 22 and an average composite score of 22. This compares to a national average SAT score of 1050 and ACT score of 20.7 in 2019.
