= Waldeck, Pennsylvania =

Unincorporated community in Pennsylvania, U.S.

Coordinates: 40°16′06″N 76°18′15″W

Waldeck is a village in southeastern Lebanon County, Pennsylvania, United States, located on Route 501, south of Schaefferstown. It is on the northern edge of the Furnace Hills in Heidelberg Township and is drained by Hammer Creek southward into Cocalico Creek. The community is served by the Newmanstown post office, with ZIP code 17073.
