= List of Pennsylvania state historical markers in Lebanon County =

Location of Lebanon County in Pennsylvania

This is a list of the Pennsylvania state historical markers in Lebanon County.

This is intended to be a complete list of the official state historical markers placed in Lebanon County, Pennsylvania by the Pennsylvania Historical and Museum Commission (PHMC). The locations of the historical markers, as well as the latitude and longitude coordinates as provided by the PHMC's database, are included below when available. There are 32 historical markers located in Lebanon County.

== Historical markers ==
Marker title	Image	Date dedicated	Location	Marker type	Topics
Blue Mountain Forts		December 6, 1949	Jonestown Rd. (old U.S. 22), near intersection with Pa. 934, at Harper Tavern	Roadside	Forts, French & Indian War, Government & Politics 18th Century, Military, Native American
Cornwall Banks		March 1, 1947	Boyd St., Cornwall, at now abandoned mine 40.26826°N 76.40449°W	Roadside	Business & Industry, Iron
Cornwall Furnace		August 1, 1948	Rexmont Rd. at site in Cornwall; 40.27138°N 76.4073°W	Roadside	Business & Industry, Furnaces, Iron
Cornwall Furnace		n/a	Boyd St. (old US 322) near Rexmont, Cornwall; 40.27135°N 76.40587°W	Roadside	Business & Industry, Furnaces, Iron
Cornwall Iron Furnace		June 1, 2005	Rts. 322 & 419, near Quentin, W of Cornwall; 40.5158°N 76.68°W	Roadside	American Revolution, Furnaces, Iron
Fort Swatara		July 14, 1999	Pa. 72, about a mile N of Lickdale; 40.46456°N 76.51436°W	Roadside	Early Settlement, Forts, French & Indian War, Military, Native American
Fort Zeller		March 21, 1947	PA 419 (Main St.) at Ft. Zeller Rd., Newmanstown; 40.34505°N 76.22298°W	Roadside	Forts, French & Indian War, Military, Native American
Grubb's First Forge		June 7, 1967	Boyd St. & Gold Rd., Miners' Village, Cornwall; 40.26727°N 76.40213°W	City	Business & Industry, Iron
Indiantown		March 1, 1947	Fisher Ave. (PA 934), just S of old US 22, Harper Tavern; 40.40153°N 76.57581°W	Roadside	Early Settlement, Native American
Indiantown Gap		n/a	US 22 NE of Harrisburg, E of Rt. 743 intersection	Roadside	Cities & Towns, Military, Native American
Indiantown Gap Military Reservation		March 1, 1947	SR 4019, 1.3 miles N of U.S. 22 approaching Fort Indiantown Gap, Harper Tavern; 40.42317°N 76.57598°W	Roadside	Military, Military Post-Civil War
Indiantown Gap Military Reservation		March 1, 1947	old US 22 S of Fort Indiantown Gap, near PA 934, Harper Tavern; 40.40676°N 76.58062°W	Roadside	Military, Military Post-Civil War
Jacob Albright		June 7, 1967	Pa. 897 near Main & Shad Sts., Kleinfeltersville; 40.30244°N 76.24527°W	City	Ethnic & Immigration, Religion
James Lick		March 1, 1947	U.S. 22 near junction Pa. 343 just S of Fredericksburg; 40.43907°N 76.43071°W	Roadside	Medicine & Science, Professions & Vocations
John Walter		March 1, 1947	Old U.S. 22 W of Ono at cemetery 40.40238°N 76.54155°W	Roadside	Music & Theater, Publishing, Religion
Lebanon County		October 6, 1982	County-Municipal Bldg., 400 S. 8th St., Lebanon; 40.33258°N 76.42386°W	City	Agriculture, Government & Politics, Government & Politics 19th Century, Religion
Lindley Murray		March 1, 1947	U.S. 22, 18 miles NE of Harrisburg, E of junction Pa. 934 just N of Harper Tavern; 40.40183°N 76.57599°W	Roadside	Education, Mills, Professions & Vocations, Writers
Lindley Murray		March 1, 1947	Intersection Pa. 934 & old U.S. 22, Harper Tavern; 40.40456°N 76.57726°W	Roadside	Education, Mills, Professions & Vocations, Writers
Lindley Murray		March 21, 1947	Pa. 934, .2 mile N of U.S. 22, Harper Tavern; 40.40979°N 76.58159°W	Roadside	Education, Mills, Professions & Vocations, Writers
One Red Rose - PLAQUE		n/a	On church at old US 422 between SR 2019 & Berks County line, Myerstown; 40.38225°N 76.26309°W	Plaque	Religion
Pennsylvania Chatauqua, The		August 3, 2002	Pa. Route 117 and Carnegie Ave., Mt. Gretna; 40.24829°N 76.47127°W	Roadside	Artists, Education, Medicine & Science, Religion
Reed's Fort		December 6, 1949	Allentown Blvd. / Wm. Penn Hwy. (US 22), E of Fisher Ave. (PA 934), just W of Ono; 40.40699°N 76.55858°W	Roadside	Forts, French & Indian War, Military, Native American
Sattazahn Lutheran Church		October 12, 1980	At church on Green Point School Rd., N of Pa. 443 near Murray; 40.49862°N 76.53813°W	Roadside	American Revolution, Buildings, Early Settlement, Ethnic & Immigration, Military, Religion
Schaefferstown Water Company		April 22, 1995	Fountain Park at S. Market St. & Sheep Hill Rd., Schaefferstown; 40.29562°N 76.29399°W	Roadside	Business & Industry, Early Settlement, Environment
Swatara Gap		March 1, 1947	PA 72, 2 miles N of Lickdale, near Inwood; 40.47563°N 76.52138°W	Roadside	Early Settlement, Forts, French & Indian War, Military, Native American, Paths & Trails, Transportation
Transportation Corps Unit Training Center		October 16, 2008	Fisher Ave., near Quartermaster Rd., Ft. Indiantown Gap, Annville	Roadside	Education, Military, Military Post-Civil War, Transportation
Tulpehocken Evangelical and Reformed Church		August 27, 1954	Benjamin Franklin Hwy. / E Lincoln Ave (US 422) near E Main Ave., 3 miles E of Myerstown	Roadside	Buildings, Religion
Union Canal		January 6, 1950	U.S. 422, 1 mile W of Myerstown; 40.36892°N 76.33415°W	Roadside	Canals, Navigation, Transportation
Union Canal		September 28, 1950	PA 72 just S of PA 443 junction, near iron bridge, 4 miles NW of Lickdale; 40.47981°N 76.5322°W	Roadside	Canals, Navigation, Transportation
Union Canal		April 1, 1950	Pa. 72, 5 miles NW of Lebanon; 40.39541°N 76.48622°W	Roadside	Canals, Navigation, Transportation
Union Canal Tunnel		March 21, 1947	At site on Tunnel Hill Rd. (SR 4001) near W Maple St. / Ebenezer Rd.(PA 72) junction, NW of Lebanon; 40.34983°N 76.46015°W	Roadside	Canals, Navigation, Transportation
Union Forge		n/a	SR 1020 just E of Pa. 72, Lickdale; 40.45296°N 76.51106°W	Roadside	Business & Industry, Coal, Iron

== See also ==
- List of Pennsylvania state historical markers
- National Register of Historic Places listings in Lebanon County, Pennsylvania
