= Schaeffer House =

Historic house in Pennsylvania, United States

- U.S. National Register of Historic Places
- U.S. National Historic Landmark
- U.S. Historic district – Contributing property
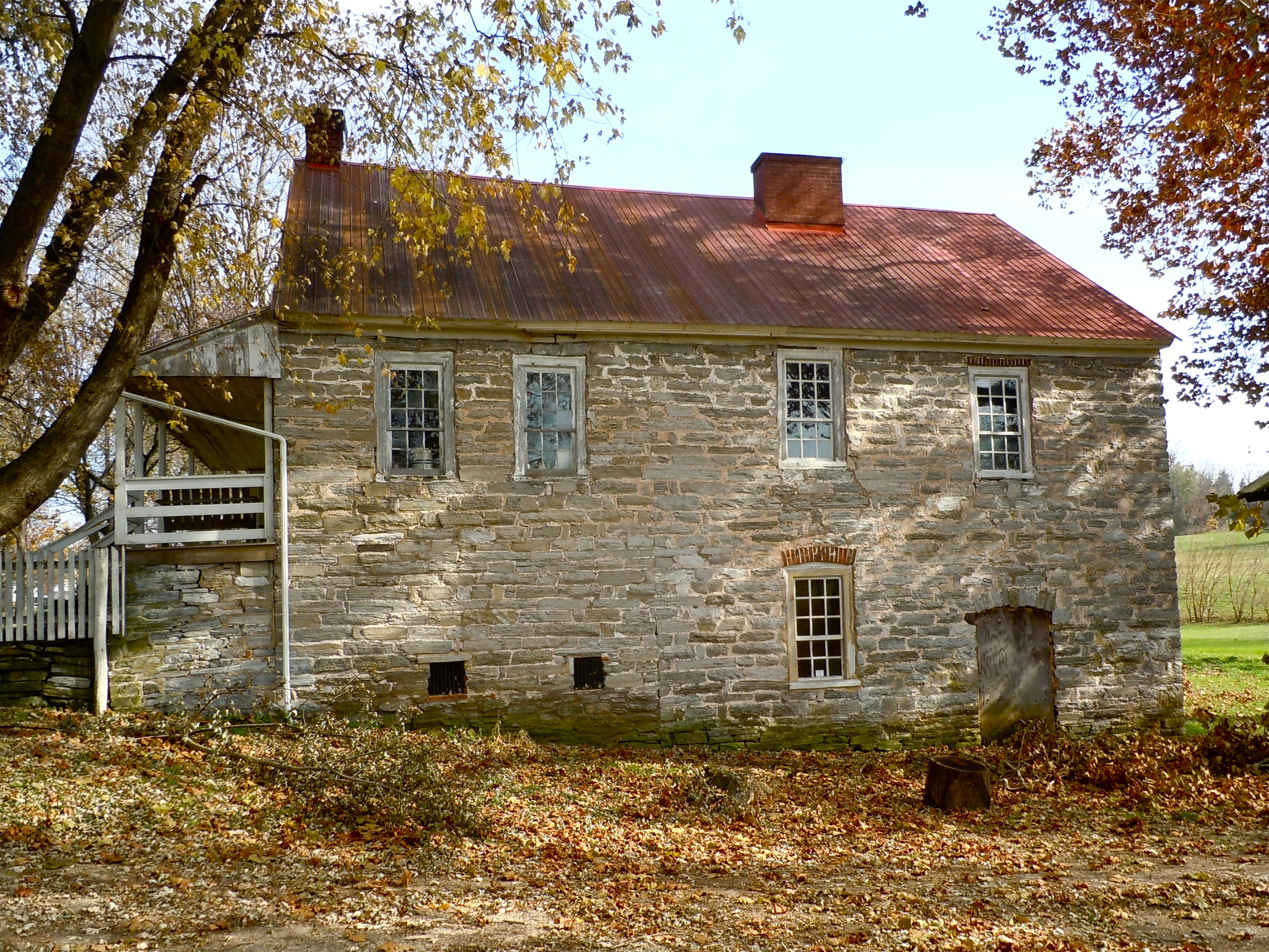
- Schaeffer House, November 2011

- Location within Pennsylvania Location within the United States
- Location: 213 S. Carpenter St., Schaefferstown, Heidelberg Township, Pennsylvania
- Coordinates: 40°17′47″N 76°18′1″W
- Area: less than one acre
- Built: c. 1736, c. 1771
- Architectural style: Colonial, Germanic
- Part of: Brendle Farms (ID72001130)
- NRHP reference No.: 11000630

Significant dates
- Added to NRHP: July 25, 2011
- Designated CP: July 24, 1972

The Alexander Schaeffer House is a historic house museum at 213 South Carpenter Road in Schaefferstown, Heidelberg Township, Lebanon County, Pennsylvania. Built about 1736 and enlarged in 1771, it is a rare example of an 18th-century colonial German-style Weinbauernhouse (transliterated from German as "winemaker's house"), in which a residence and the production of alcohol products are combined in a single building. The house is on the upper Brendle Farms property of Historic Schaefferstown, which offers tours of the house by appointment. It was designated a National Historic Landmark in 2011.

== Description and history ==
The Alexander Schaeffer House stands in a farm complex on about 90 acres (36 ha) of land on the south side of Schaefferstown, with its principal access drive leading west from South Carpenter Street. The oldest portion of the structure is 2 1/2 stories in height, built out of coursed rubble limestone joined with lime mortar. It is set on sloping land, which provides for banked entrances on the ground level and second floor. Window placement is irregular, and the multiple entrances serve different functional purposes. The ground floor spaces originally had dirt floors and were treated as a work space even in the house's early days, while the upper level had a living space with three rooms, serving as kitchen, parlor, and bedchamber. The interior retains 18th-century wide flooring, doors, and hardware, although whether those things date to the original construction or later alteration is unclear.

This basic plan, built about 1738, was altered in 1771 by Alexander Schaeffer, who purchased the property in 1758, and for whom the town is named. He extended the building with a two-story addition, constructed with similar materials to those used in the original. The ground floor space under the original section had a vaulted storage space built into it, with a large kitchen for operating a still in the upper floor of the addition. The fireplace in the original kitchen was also adapted for use in the distillation process. Schaeffer probably acquired this property in order to provide spirits for a tavern he operated on the main road in town.

== See also ==
- List of National Historic Landmarks in Pennsylvania
- National Register of Historic Places listings in Lebanon County, Pennsylvania
