= Dissinger =

Dissinger is a surname. Notable people with the surname include:

- Christian Dissinger (born 1991), German handball player
- Moses Dissinger (1824–1883), American minister
