= Rex House =

Historic house in Pennsylvania, United States

- U.S. National Register of Historic Places
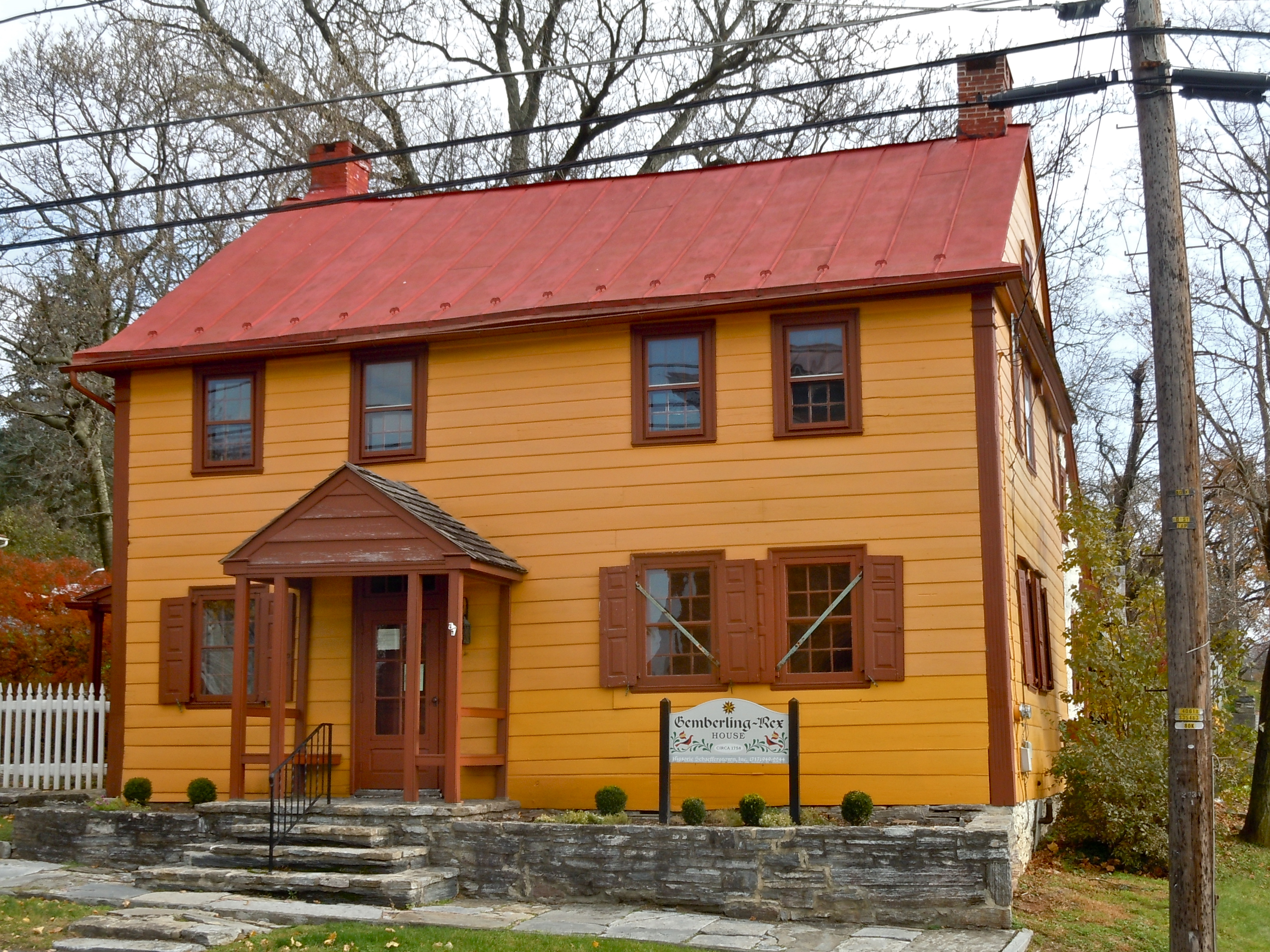
- Rex House, November 2011

- Location within Pennsylvania Location within the United States
- Location: North Market Street, Schaefferstown, Pennsylvania
- Coordinates: 40°17′53″N 76°17′36″W
- Area: 0.5 acres (0.20 ha)
- Built: 1729
- Architectural style: Half-timbered
- NRHP reference No.: 80003551
- Added to NRHP: August 11, 1980

The Rex House, also known as the Gemberling-Rex House, is an historic home that is located in Schaefferstown in Heidelberg Township, Lebanon County, Pennsylvania, United States.

Built in 1729 by early Pennsylvania German settlers, his structure is a 2 1/2-story, half timbered residence with originally scored plaster exterior and, currently, a horizontal wooden siding and a gable roof. It measures thirty-two feet by twelve feet and has gable end brick chimneys. Also on the property are a contributing smoke house, bake oven, stone foundation of a barn and outhouse and cistern.

It was added to the National Register of Historic Places in 1980.

== History ==
Originally a modest three-room structure, by 1798 it was radically altered to include refinements of the Anglo-American elite after which it was purchased by Samuel Rex, who was Schaefferstown's most prominent resident. The home and its occupants represent the product "of cultural conflict between the English majority and an ethnic German minority," where historians contend there was pressure of Pennsylvania Germans to culturally conform.

The Gemberling-Rex House is open for tours as part of the Historic Schaefferstown museum.
