= Bomberger's Distillery =

- U.S. National Register of Historic Places
- U.S. National Historic Landmark
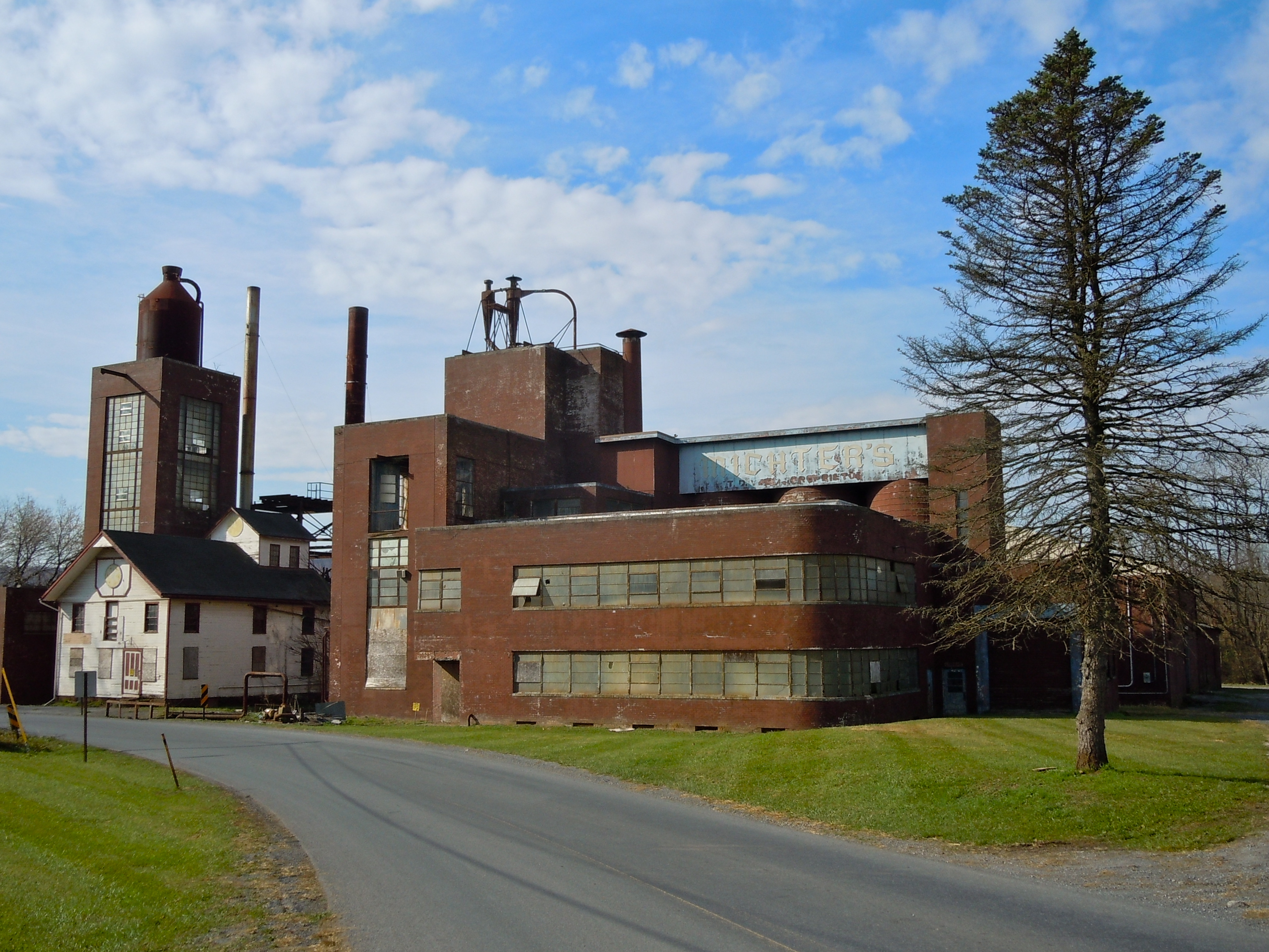

- Location within Pennsylvania Location within the United States
- Location: Michter's Rd., Newmanstown, Pennsylvania
- Coordinates: 40°16′36.9″N 76°19′12.7″W
- Area: 0.4 acres (0.16 ha)
- Built: 1840
- Architect: John Kratz; Abe Bomberger
- NRHP reference No.: 75001649

Significant dates
- Added to NRHP: June 26, 1975
- Designated NHL: January 16, 1980

Bomberger's Distillery, more recently Michter's Distillery, is a non-operating distillery facility that was, at the end of the twentieth century, believed to be the oldest remaining such building in the United States. The distillery closed in 1989. Although there are whiskey products currently on the market using the Bomberger's and Michter's brand names, they are more recently introduced products that have no direct connection to the old distillery.

The complex, which is located near Schaefferstown, Pennsylvania, represented the transformation of whiskey distilling from an agricultural enterprise into a large-scale industry. The surviving still house, warehouse, and jug house date from about 1840, but the site has a documented history of spirit production since 1753.

Bomberger's was listed on the National Register of Historic Places in 1975, and was declared a National Historic Landmark in 1980. The facility was America's smallest commercial distiller at the time of its 1989 closure.

== History ==
In 1753, John and Michael Shenk, Swiss Mennonite farmers, began distilling rye whiskey at the site. John Shenk's son-in-law, Rudolph Meyer, acquired the distillery and another relative, John Kratzer, ran the business from 1827 to about 1860. Several of the buildings date to Kratzer's tenure. About 1860, Abraham Bomberger, a Pennsylvania Dutchman who had ties to the Shenk family, purchased the distillery from the Kratzer family. With Prohibition the distillery closed in 1919. Ephraim Sechrist bought the distillery in 1920, but did not operate it until 1934 after Prohibition ended, selling it to Louis Forman in 1942. Forman sold the distillery soon after he was drafted for service in World War II, but repurchased it in 1950 after two other owners. One of these owners was Schenley Distilleries.

Forman and his master distiller, Charles Everett Beam, of the well known Kentucky distilling family, designed a premium old-fashioned pot-still mash whiskey that they named "Michter's Original Sour Mash Whiskey" after Forman's sons Michael and Peter.

In 1951 Forman distilled the first batch of Michter's, but by the time it had aged the required six years a recession prevented him from selling it. The distillery was acquired by Pennco Distillers, while Forman kept the formula and the aged whiskey. Pennco then used the facility for contract distilling until 1978 and Forman distributed Michter's Whiskey through his liquor wholesaling business. Sometime around 1978, Forman and his Lebanon County backers organized Michter's Distillery, Inc., which bought the distillery at the foreclosure sale of Pennco. Michter's and the distillery finally closed in 1989 after a bankruptcy filling.

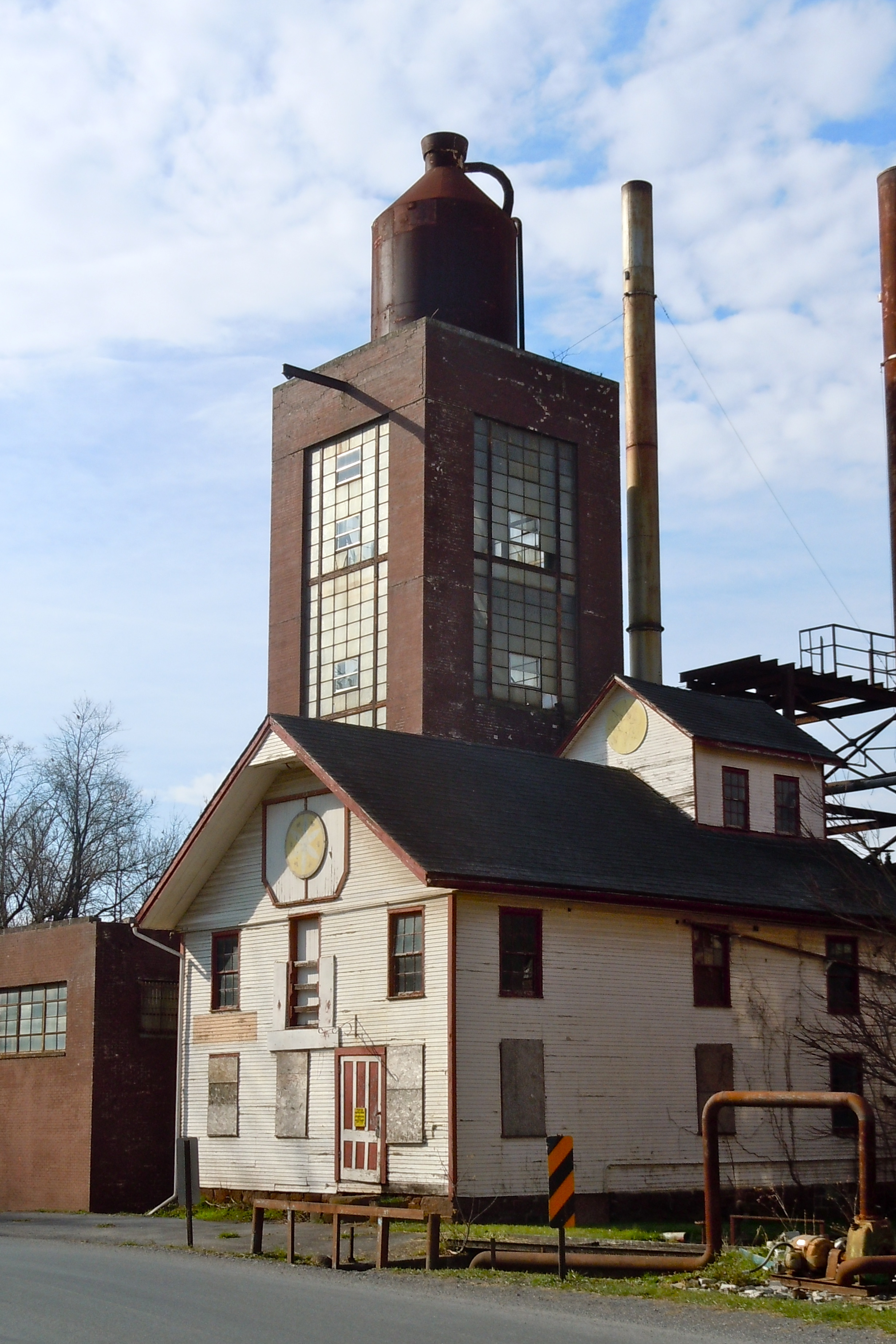
Old distillery, tower, and jug

Today the distillery is severely deteriorated from lack of maintenance and the former owner, a woodworker named Dwight Hostetter, sold it in 2011 to John Barry of JJC Investments.

Since 2004, whiskeys, including bourbon, rye, and a version of the Michter's Original Sour Mash brand, made in Kentucky, have been sold under the Michter's label, now owned by Chatham Imports, Inc. The company has built a new distillery in Louisville, also known as the Michter's Distillery, with spirit production having commenced.

In 2014, Heritage Spirits began using the Bomberger's Distillery brand name on a small-production blend of straight whiskeys sourced from other distilleries. The blending and bottling of the new brand is done at the Thistle Finch Distillery in Lancaster, Pennsylvania.

As of October 2017, the company built and operates a distillery in Lititz, Pennsylvania, eight miles south of the original location, operating under the name of Stoll & Wolfe Distillery. People involved in the new venture include Dick Stoll, the 1974 master distiller of the Michter's and A. H. Hirsch brands, and local residents Erik and Avianna Wolfe.

== See also ==
- List of National Historic Landmarks in Pennsylvania
- National Register of Historic Places listings in Lebanon County, Pennsylvania
- List of historic whisky distilleries
