= Kleinfeltersville, Pennsylvania =

Unincorporated community in Pennsylvania, US

- Unincorporated community
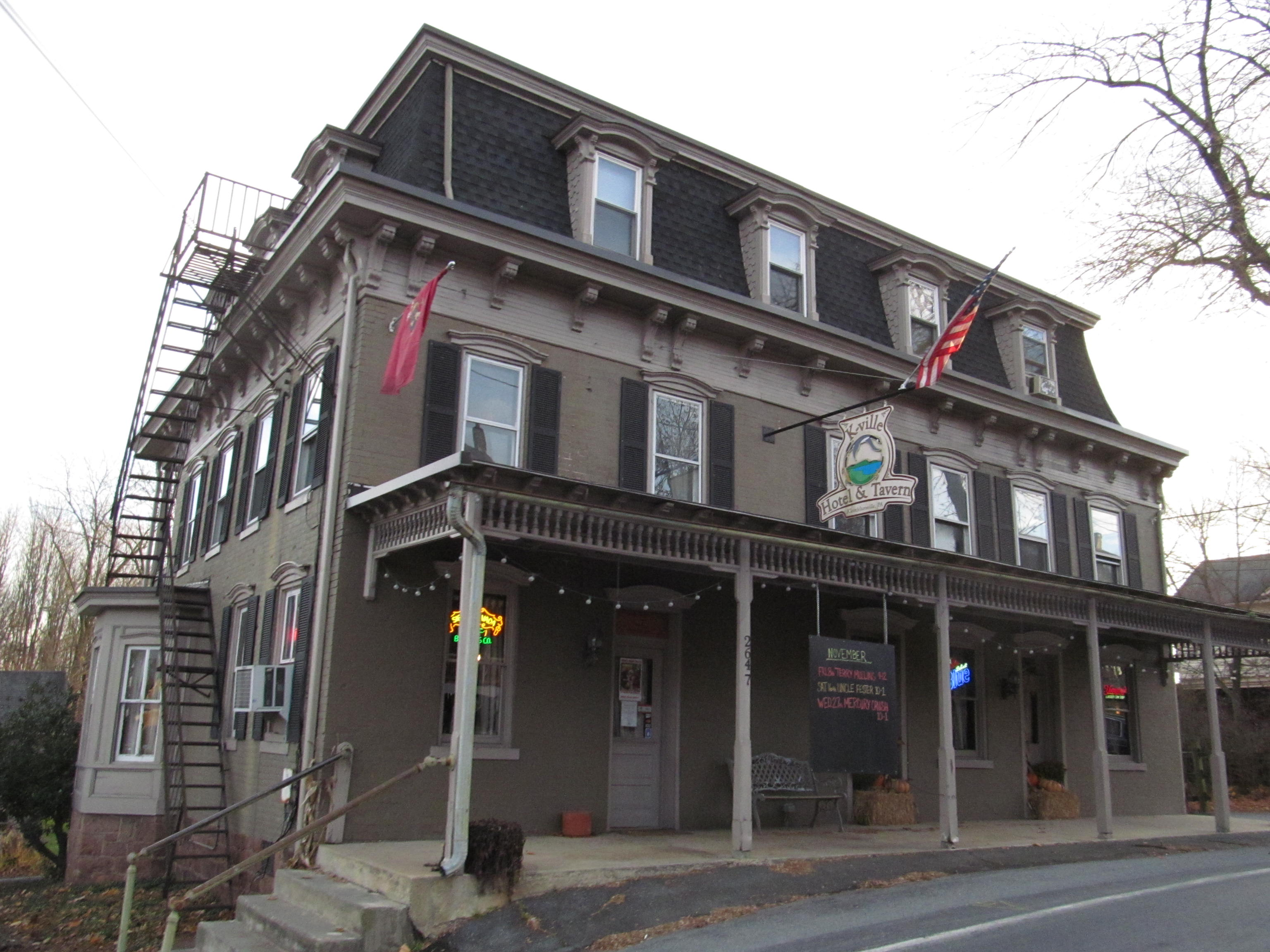
- Kleinfeltersville Hotel and Tavern

- Location within Pennsylvania Location within the United States
- Coordinates: 40°18′3″N 76°14′57″W
- Country: United States
- State: Pennsylvania
- County: Lebanon
- Township: Heidelberg
- Elevation: 581 ft (177 m)
- Time zone: UTC-5 (Eastern (EST))
  - Summer (DST): UTC-4 (EDT)
- ZIP code: 17039
- Area code: 717
- GNIS feature ID: 1178581

Kleinfeltersville is an unincorporated community in Heidelberg Township, Lebanon County, Pennsylvania, United States. It is almost due east of Schaefferstown on Pennsylvania Route 897.

Kleinfeltersville is one of the longest one-word, unhyphenated place names in the United States recognized by the U.S. Board on Geographic Names. At 17 characters, it is tied with Mooselookmeguntic, Maine. Kleinfeltersville (ZIP code 17039) is the longest one-word name given to a United States Post Office. Kleinfeltersville has a post office, but there is no mail delivery from it. It simply houses P.O. boxes. Mail delivery for southeastern Heidelberg Township comes from the post office in Newmanstown.

It is the site of the Kleinfeltersville Hotel and Tavern, built before the start of the American Civil War. The original hotel burned down on April 1, 2015, and was replaced by a modern restaurant. It is also known to outdoorsmen as the community nearest to the Middle Creek Wildlife Management Area, a popular location for birdwatching and other outdoor activities. Kleinfeltersville is the closest town to the Middle Creek Visitors Center.

Kleinfeltersville is also home to Albright Memorial Church which is the location of Jacob Albright's grave. Jacob Albright (1759-1808) was the son of German immigrants. He preached to poor farmers in the area and rose to become Bishop of the Methodist Church.

The village of Kleinfeltersville itself has a background steeped in religious history as it is the center of the founding of the Evangelical Association (a German expression of Methodism) by Jacob Albright. A follower of Jacob Albright, Rev. John R. Kleinfelter, was the founder of Kleinfeltersville, when he purchased a farm of approximately 200 acres from his father-in-law in 1824. This acreage, when divided between Rev. Kleinfelter's eight children, beginning in 1848, served as the nucleus of the village.

Located in town is the Kleinfeltersville Hotel & Tavern. The original building was built prior to 1860 of brick supplied undoubtedly from one of the local brick manufacturing companies and was originally started as a two-story building with an extension added in 1884 by then owner Henry Noll. In the early 1890s or early 1900s, owner Adam Spade added a mansard roofed third story to the hotel.

The hotel served as a hostelry for workers in the area cigar factories, brick factory and travelers as they traversed the southeastern portion of Lebanon County in the triangle between Reading, Lancaster and Harrisburg. It is rumored, according to the 1892 guest ledger of the hotel that Grover Cleveland and Adlai Stevenson spent time here just 11 days prior to their election on November 8, 1892. This visit is questionable, but possible if they were on the campaign trail.

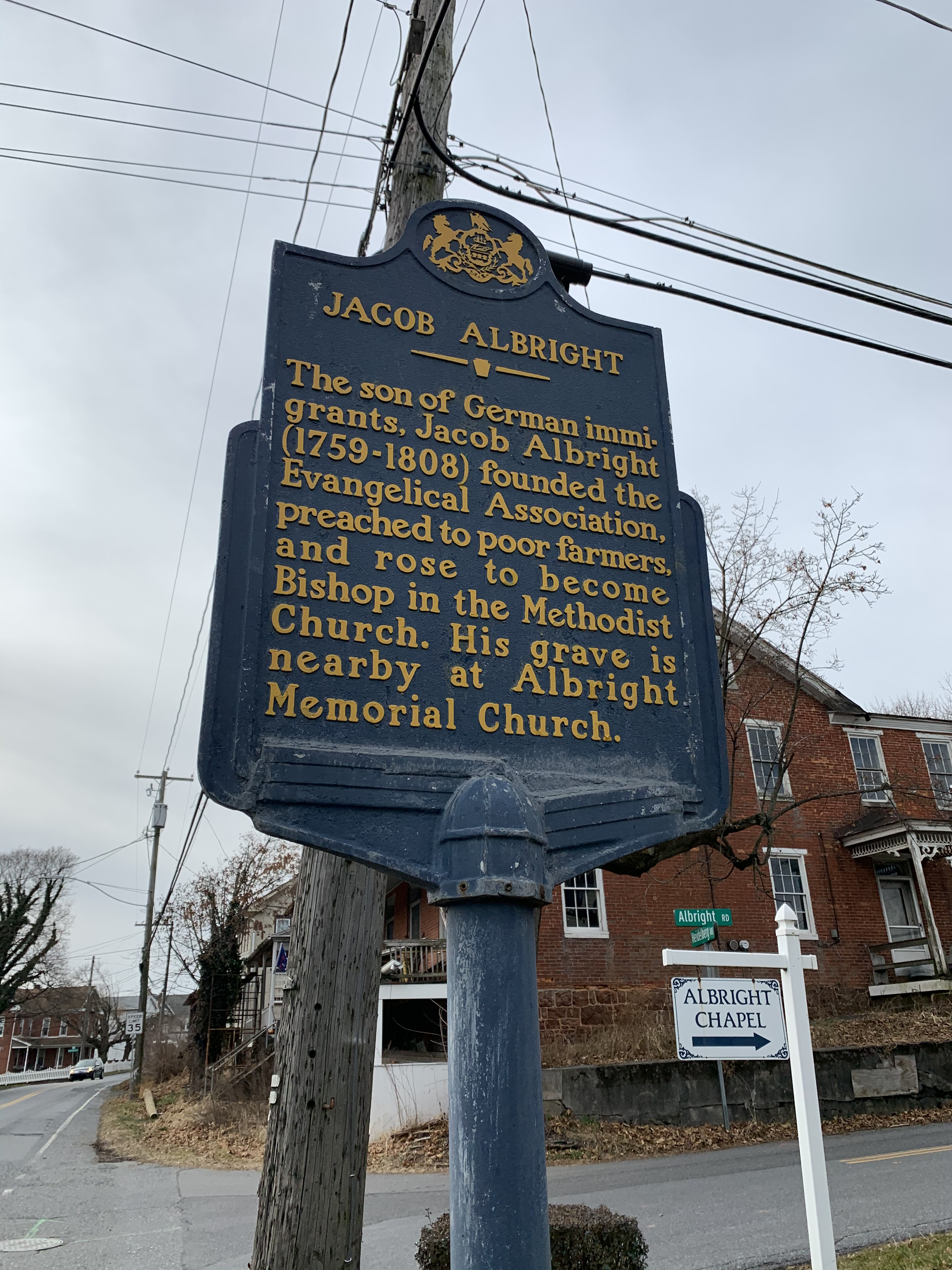
Historical marker for Jacob Albright

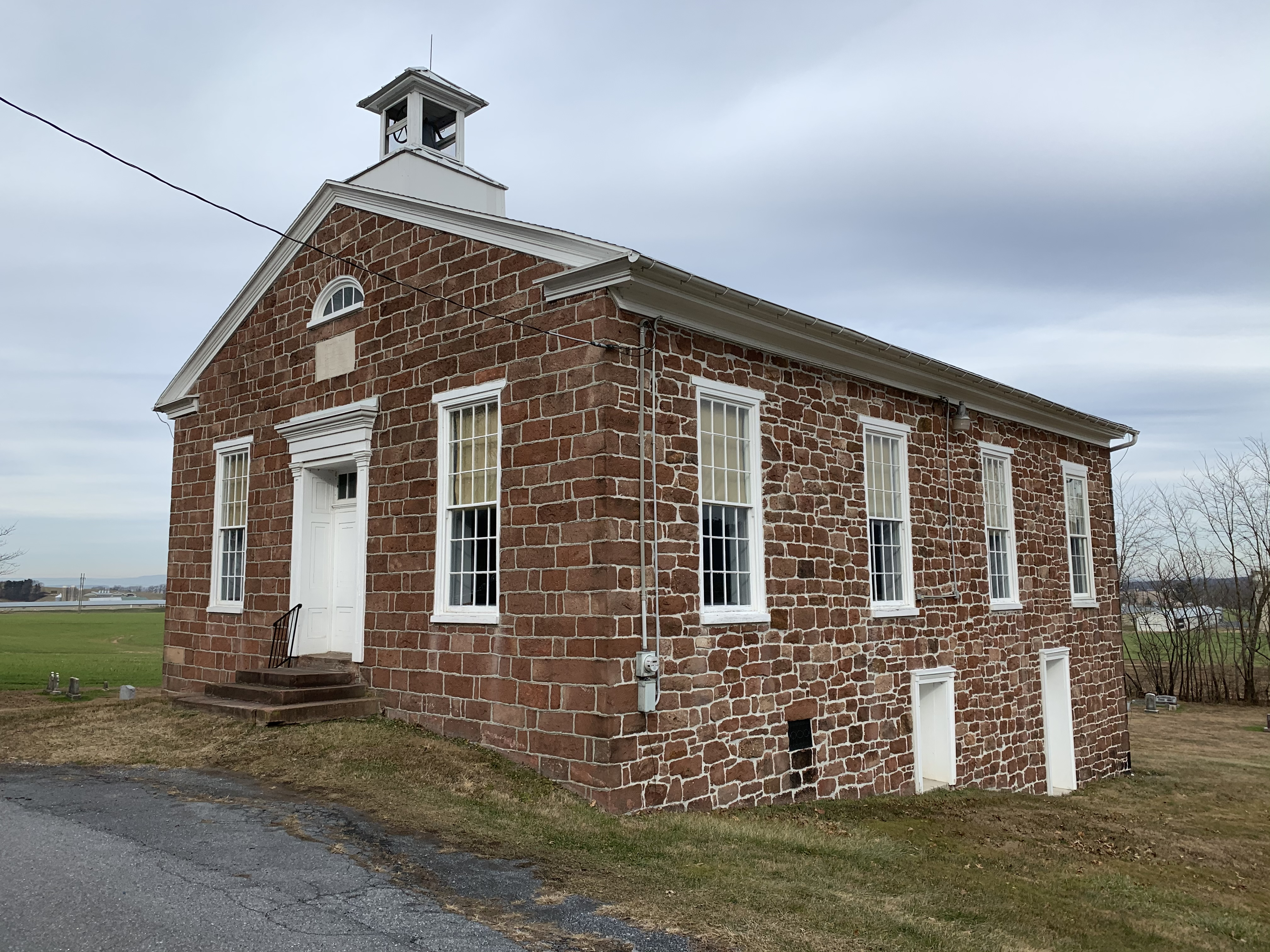
Albright Memorial Chapel
