= Brendle Farms =

- U.S. National Register of Historic Places
- Location within Pennsylvania Location within the United States
- Location: Jct. of PA 501 and 897, Schaefferstown, Pennsylvania
- Coordinates: 40°17′45″N 76°18′12″W
- Area: 347 acres (140 ha)
- Built: c. 1750
- Built by: John Miley
- Architectural style: "Swiss bank"
- NRHP reference No.: 72001130
- Added to NRHP: July 24, 1972

Brendle Farms, also known as the Alexander Schaeffer Farm and Sheetz Farm, is a historic home and farm located at Schaefferstown in Heidelberg Township, Lebanon County, Pennsylvania. The house was built about 1750, and is a 2 1/2-story, Swiss bank house with a large arched wine cellar and distillery. Also on the property are a contributing bank barn (c. 1894), stone pigsty (c. 1740), limestone smokehouse, wheat barn (c. 1840), and wagon shed and corn crib. A second 2 1/2-story dwelling is located on the Lower Farm, along with a Swiss bank barn. The house is part of the Historic Schaefferstown museum.

Brendle Farm was added to the National Register of Historic Places in 1972. The Schaeffer House located on the Upper Farm was added to the National Register of Historic Places and designated a National Historic Landmark in 2011.
