= Philip Erpff House =

Historic house in Pennsylvania, United States

- U.S. National Register of Historic Places
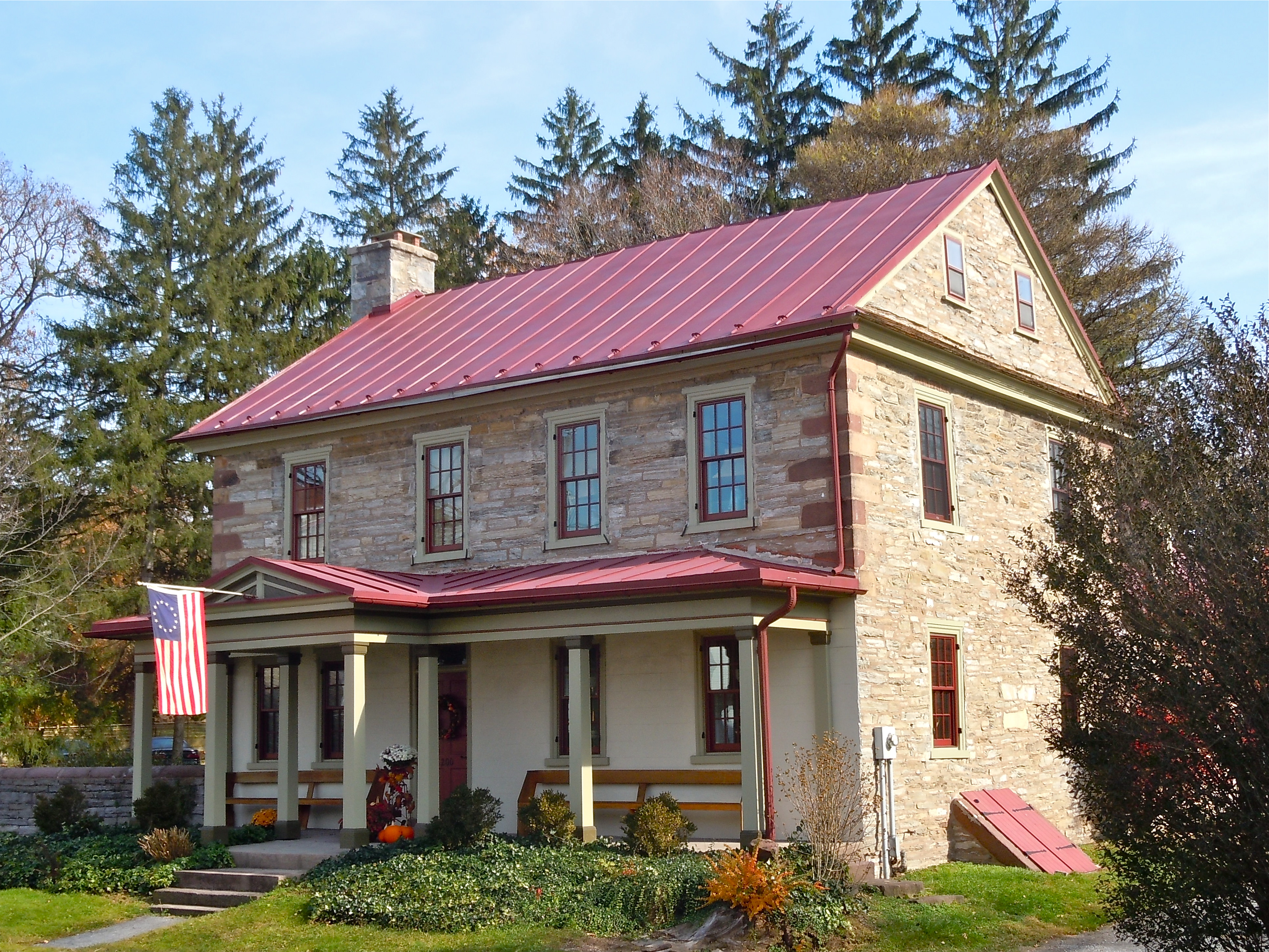
- Philip Erpff House, November 2011

- Location within Pennsylvania Location within the United States
- Location: South Market Street, Schaefferstown, Pennsylvania
- Coordinates: 40°17′47″N 76°17′37″W
- Area: 2 acres (0.81 ha)
- Built: c. 1750
- Architectural style: Germanic vernacular
- NRHP reference No.: 79002287
- Added to NRHP: November 20, 1979

The Philip Erpff House is an historic home that is located in Schaefferstown, in Heidelberg Township, Lebanon County, Pennsylvania, United States.

It was added to the National Register of Historic Places in 1979.

== History and architectural features ==
Built circa 1750, this historic structure is a 2 1/2-story, limestone residence with a gable roof. It is five bays wide and measures thirty-six feet, seven inches, by twenty-six feet, six inches. It features large limestone quoins and a limestone chimney and was designed in the vernacular Germanic tradition.

Also located on the property are a contributing limestone wash house, a limestone spring house, and the "Arch," which is an underground cold storage area that has a vaulted ceiling and two niches on the back wall.
