= Weigley Mansion =

Second Empire mansion in Pennsylvania, U.S.

Heidelberg Hall
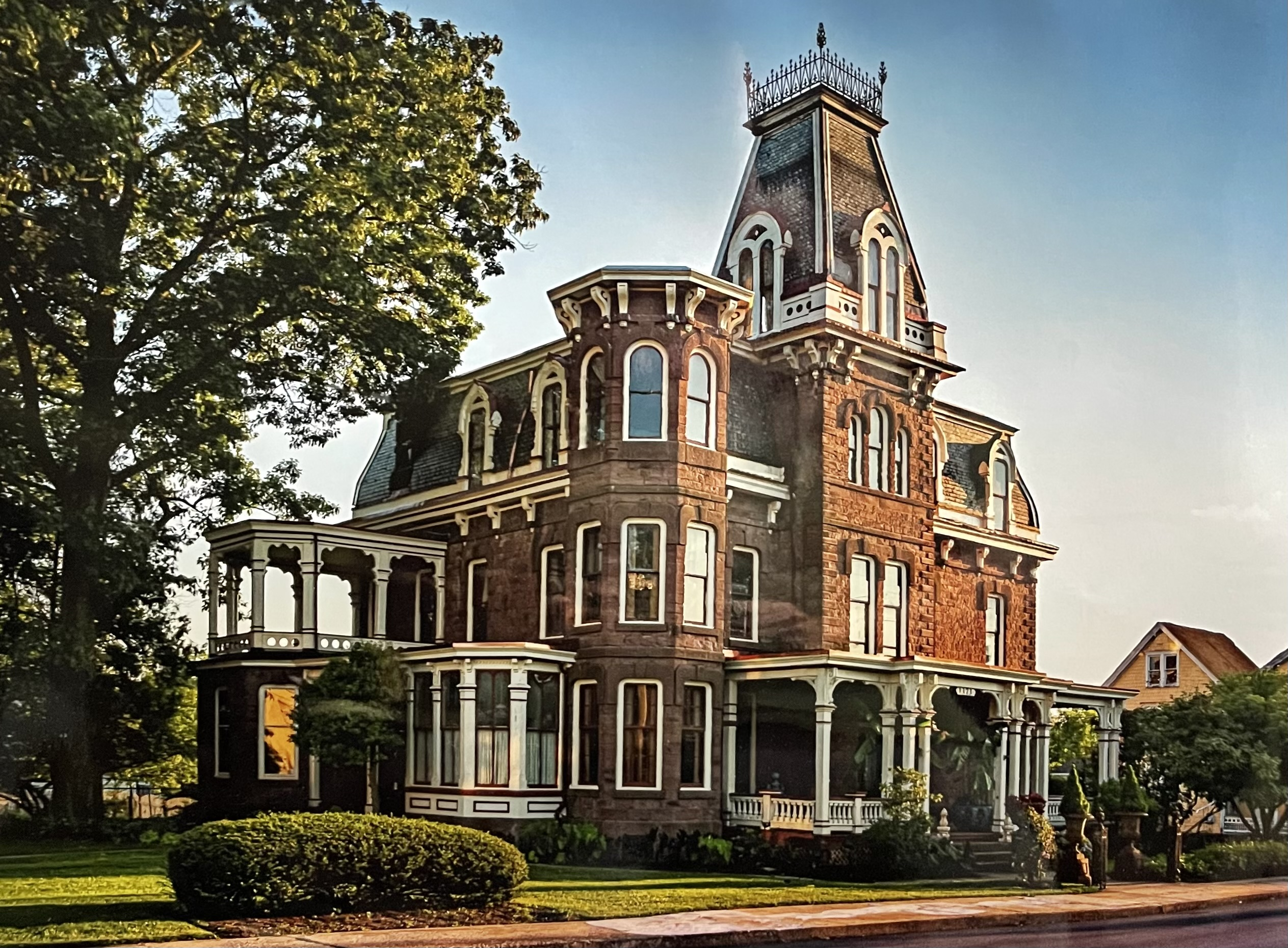
- Weigley Mansion (Heidelberg Hall), Northeast View, 2021

- Location within Pennsylvania Location within the United States
- Former names: Weigley Mansion
- Alternative names: Heidelberg Hall

General information
- Type: Residential: mansion
- Architectural style: Second Empire
- Location: Schaefferstown, Pennsylvania, 1373 Heidelberg Avenue
- Coordinates: 40°17′42″N 76°17′43″W
- Completed: 1882
- Cost: $32,000 ($874,156.26 in 2022 dollars)
- Owner: Wayne David Hand

Technical details
- Floor area: 12,000 square feet (1,100 m^{2}) – (includes basement and attic spaces)

Design and construction
- Architects: Isaac H. Hobbs & Son

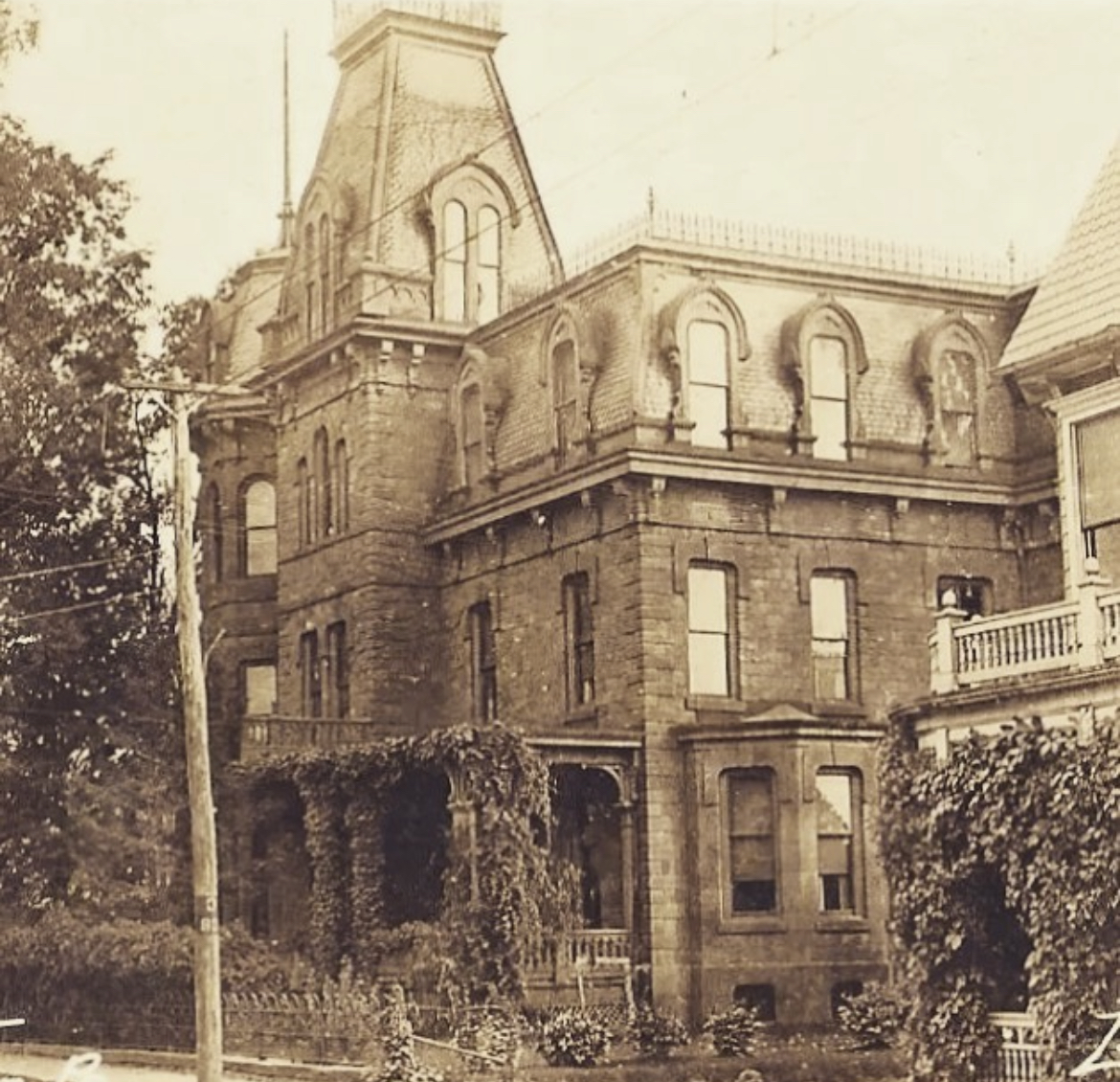

Heidelberg Hall, also known as The Weigley Mansion, is located at 1373 Heidelberg Avenue, Schaefferstown, Lebanon County, Pennsylvania is a reddish-brown sandstone grand mansion designed in the Second Empire architectural style. It was built from 1876 to 1882, for William M. Weigley, one of Lebanon County’s wealthiest and most influential men during the late nineteenth century, and designed by the noted Philadelphia architect Isaac Harding Hobbs. The architectural firm of Isaac H. Hobbs & Son was known for designing various structures including churches, banks, office buildings, and schools using various architectural styles including Gothic Revival, Italian Villa, Renaissance Revival, Chalet, and Greek Revival. Their most publicized work was expressively ornate mansard-roofed suburban and country residences which include the Weigley Mansion and was published in Godey’s Lady’s Magazine in April 1875, Scientific American in July 1875, and Isaac Hobbs 1876 publication still in print by Dover Publications.

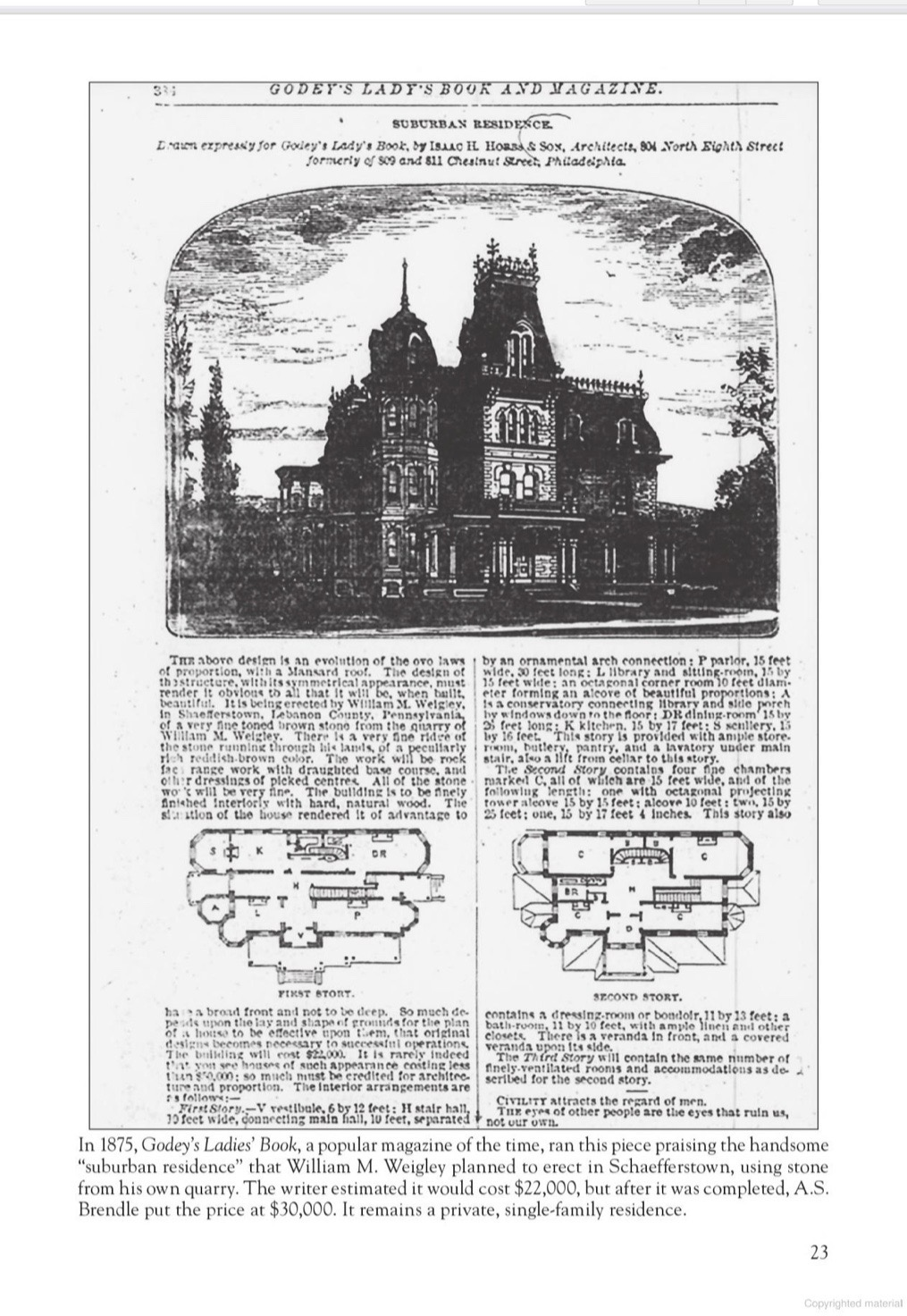

Weigley Mansion (Heidelberg Hall) is a classic example of Gilded Age exuberance as it includes design features such as two front towers, detailed chestnut wood moldings, thick solid paneled chestnut interior doors, a projecting second-story open porch, ornamental cast iron roof crests, three large formal entrance ways, high decorative plaster ceilings, several ornate chandeliers, a grand main staircase and nine fireplaces.

== William M. Weigley ==
William M. Weigley (1818-1887) was educated at the Tulpehocken Academy near Stouchsburg, PA. He began his business career working as a clerk in retail stores and eventually purchased a store originally owned by Abraham Rex in Schaefferstown. After expanding his business holdings into other area retail stores he purchased several farms, a stone quarry, and a grist mill. In 1841, he married Anna Rex, and they had three children: Anna Isadore, Rex, and William Wallace. He was known as a philanthropist and was involved with many community improvement projects including the funding of the local fire company, Sunday schools, churches, and various civic organizations. He was able to rebound from near-financial collapse during the Panic of 1857, and at the time of his death was a very wealthy person.

== History ==
During the construction of the structure, William Weigley changed Hobbs’ original first floor-plan of a plain scullery (workroom) to a finished breakfast and sitting room. This was a common practice in the nineteenth century during the construction of extravagant houses. William Weigley’s desire to showcase his wealth in a large eloquent mansion did not last long for him as he died only a few years after his mansion was completed. However, his family lived in the mansion until the 1940s. The Weigley family sold the mansion to a local jeweler who set up a jewelry store on the first-floor parlor room. Over the past several decades the mansion has been owned by different private individuals who have kept it in mostly original condition.

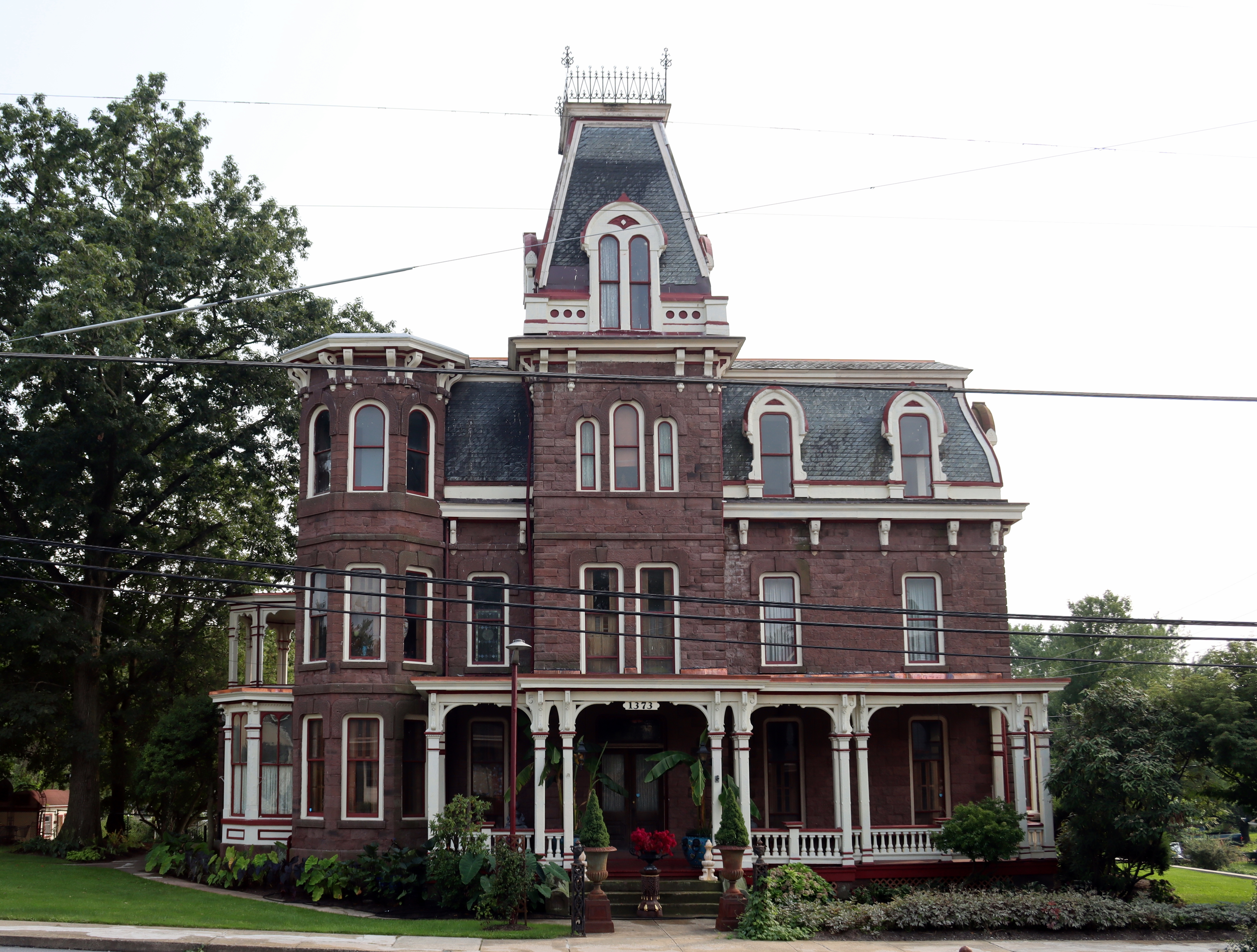
Weigley Mansion (Heidelberg Hall), Full Front North View, ca. 2021.

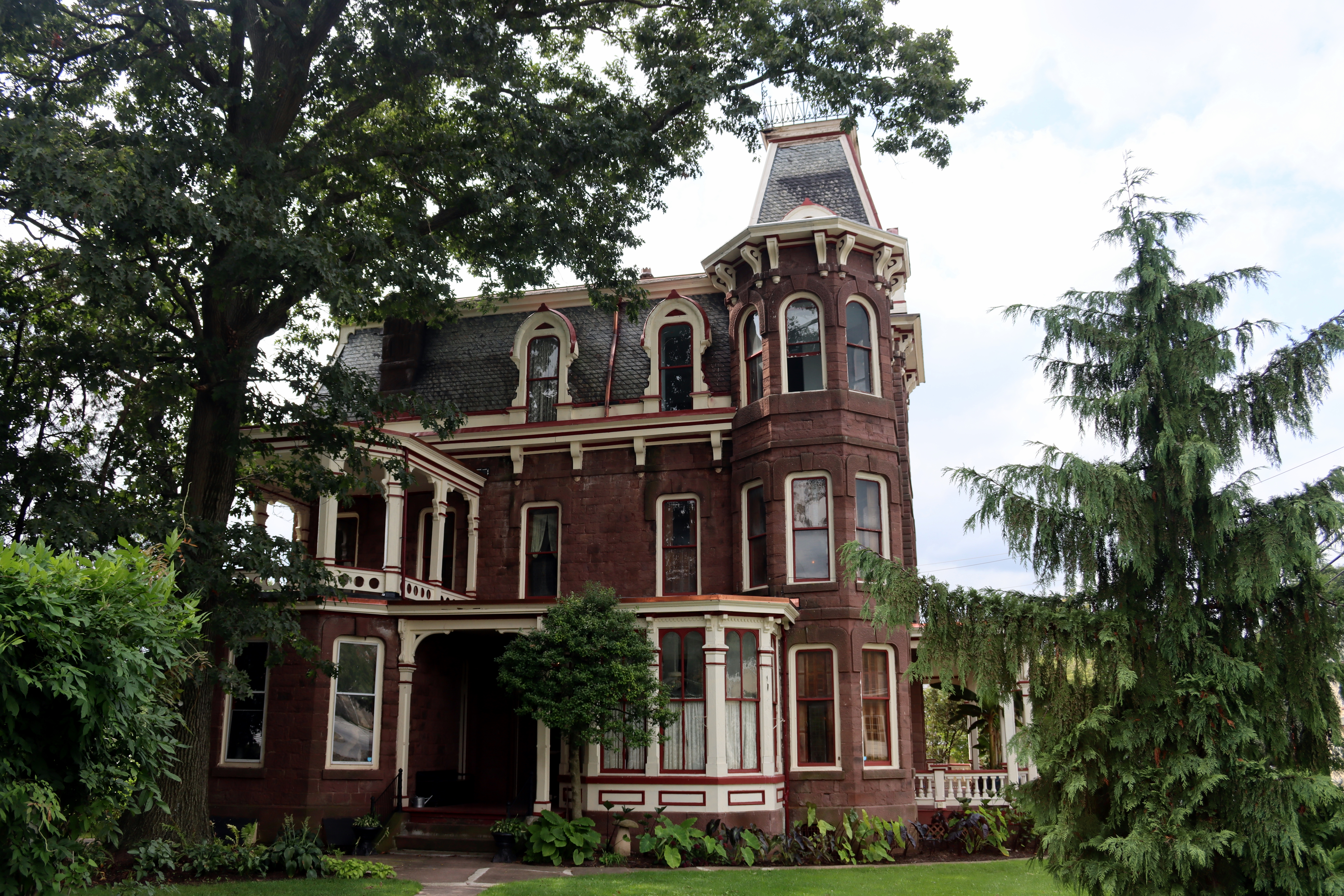
Weigley Mansion (Heidelberg Hall), Full East View, ca. 2021.

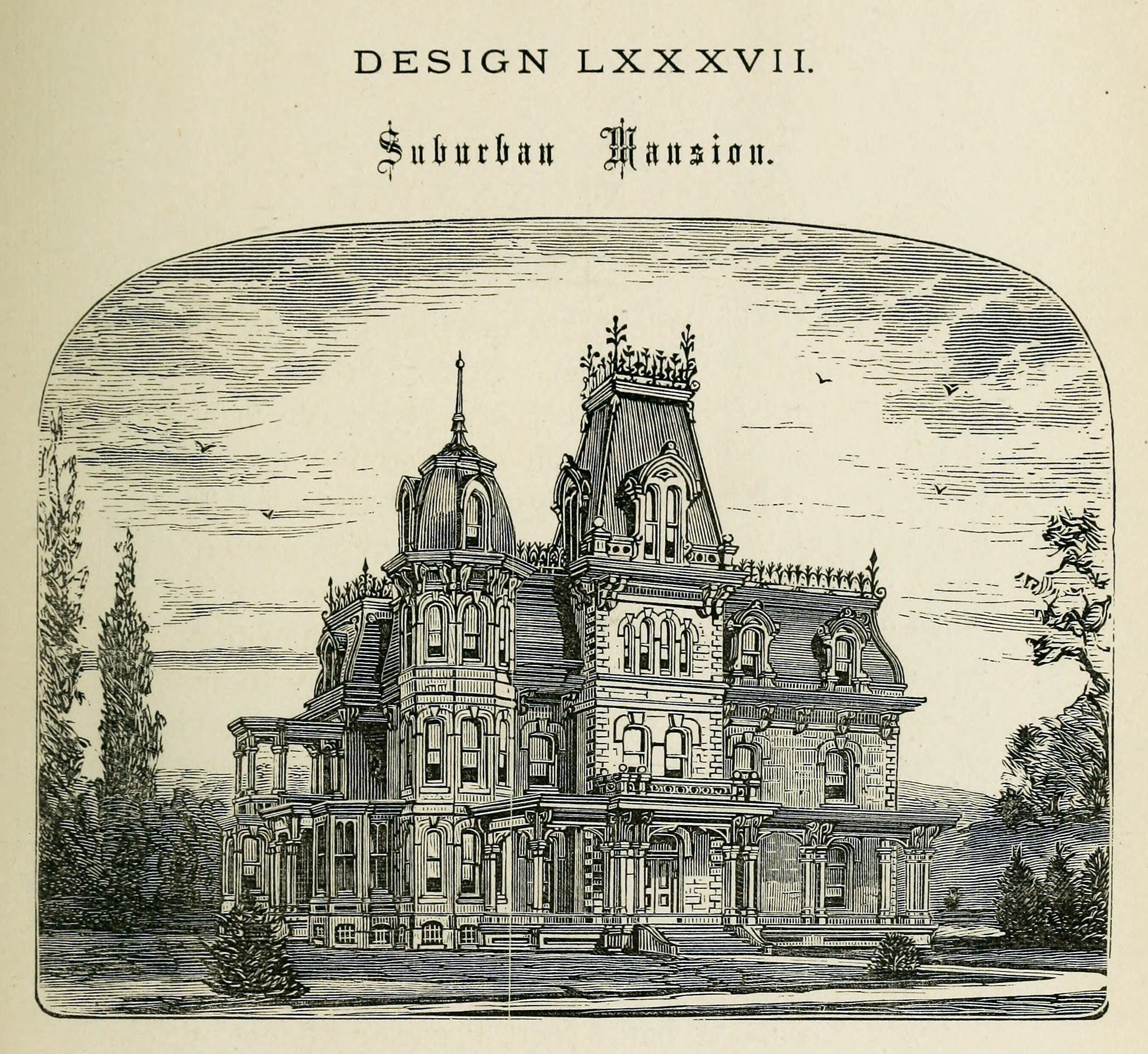
Hobbs' Architecture - Design LXXXVII - Suburban Mansion engraving, ca. 1876. Weigley Mansion (Heidelberg Hall) was the only structure ever built using this design.

== Legacy ==
Weigley Mansion is one of Lebanon County's most iconic surviving historic landmarks and a leading example of master craftsmanship in a 19th-century second-empire brown sandstone mansion, featuring some of the best examples of the Gilded Age, showcasing one of the largest private collection of 19th century American crafted furniture.
