= Moses Dissinger =

American minister (1824–1883)

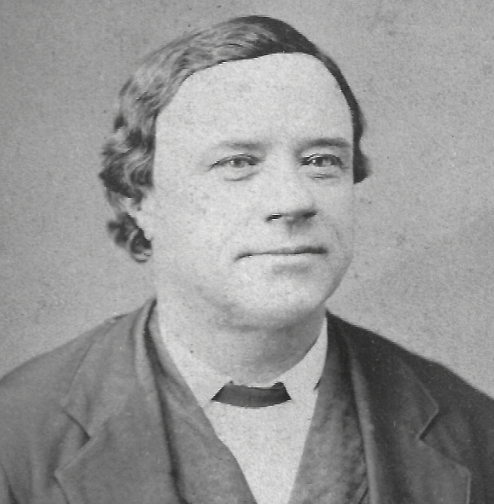
Moses Dissinger

Moses Dissinger (aka Mose; March 17, 1824 – January 25, 1883) was born in a Lutheran family in Schaefferstown, Lebanon County, Pennsylvania, and known colloquially as "the Billy Sunday of Lebanon County." He was converted to Methodism in 1842 and first licensed to preach locally in 1853. Dissinger was widowed with three young children on the death of his wife Susanna Clark Dissinger in February, 1857. In 1858, he remarried Amelia Elizabeth Stahler of Fogelsville in Lehigh County.

Dissinger was a licensed minister of the East Pennsylvania Conference of Jacob Albright's Evangelical Association from 1854 to 1879. Dissinger was characterized as a "fighting parson" for the style of his sermon deliveries in Pennsylvania German and English. From 1879 until his death in 1883, he served in the Kansas Conference of the Evangelical Association in Douglas County, Kansas.

Dissinger preached without notes and relied on an extensive memory of biblical texts and hymns. He was recorded as having a sharp tongue, occasionally carrying a club in the pulpit to make theatrical points, and hurling insults during sermons at audiences he considered unreceptive.
