= Jacob Albright =

American Christian leader

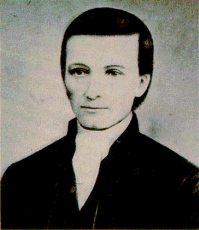
- Church: Albright's People
- Elected: 1807

Personal details
- Born: May 1, 1759 Douglass Township, Pennsylvania Colony
- Died: May 18, 1808 (aged 49) Kleinfeltersville, Pennsylvania, U.S.
- Buried: Albright Cemetery, Kleinfeltersville, Pennsylvania
- Spouse: Catherine Cope (m. 1785)

Jacob Albright (also spelled Jakob Albrecht; May 1, 1759 – May 18, 1808) was an American Christian leader, founder of Albright's People (Die Albrechtsleute) which was officially named the Evangelical Association (Evangelische Gemeinschaft) in 1816. This church as a denomination is still in existence, headquartered in Myerstown, Pennsylvania.

== Early life ==
Albright was born May 1, 1759, to John Albright (Johannes Albrecht) and his wife, in the region of Fox Mountain (Fuchsberg) in Douglass Township, now Montgomery County, northwest of Pottstown, Pennsylvania and was baptized into the Lutheran Church. His parents were German immigrants from the Palatine Region of Germany, but sources disagree on when they immigrated to the United States. Johannes Albrecht and his wife, Anna Barbara, both born in either Austria or Palatine depending on the source, came to America on the ship Johnson in 1732. There were seven children: Jacob, aged 5 among them. This Johannes and his family settled in Bern Township, Berks County where Johannes died in 1751 or 1752. His son, Jacob, left Berks County in 1760. Albright was educated in a German school where he learned reading, writing and arithmetic. In addition to speaking Pennsylvania Dutch, he spoke German and taught himself enough English so he could deliver a sermon in that language.

During the American Revolution, Jacob Albright served in Captain Jacob Witz's Seventh Company, Fourth Battalion, Philadelphia Militia as a drummer boy and later as a guard for the Hessian prisoners at Reading, Pennsylvania. Although uncertain, several sources indicate that he served through 1786.

In 1785, he married Catherine Cope and they had six (or nine) children. Only three children survived to adulthood: Sarah, wife of Noah Ranck; Jacob Jr., who died childless; and David, married to Mary Riedenbach (Raidenbach or Raidabaugh), who had children with descendants still living today. The young family moved to Earl Township, Lancaster County, and they lived near Ephrata, Pennsylvania, where the Jacob took up farming and was in the business of manufacturing tiles and bricks.

== Evangelical work ==
A German Lutheran in his heritage, he was converted after 1790 to Methodism, when several of his children died of dysentery, causing him to go through a religious crisis. Lutheranism did not give him comfort. He asked Anthony Houtz, a Dutch Reformed pastor affiliated with a study group organized by Philip William Otterbein (Otterbein's groups eventually formed the United Brethren in Christ Church) to conduct the funeral. Albright was so moved by his funeral sermon that he continued discussions with a neighbor who was a lay preacher in Otterbein's followers. Albright then joined a Methodist class (a religious meeting held in a private home). That class authorized him as an "exhorter," or lay preacher.

He felt called by God to take the message of Methodism to the German-speaking people. In 1796, Albright began carrying his message to the German-speaking residents of south-eastern Pennsylvania. He was licensed by the Methodist Church but was not permitted to preach in the German language, so he set out on his own.

Although he felt that he was unfit to preach, contemporary records reveal that he was a powerful and moving speaker, converting many to Methodism. By 1800 he had formed two classes in Bucks County, north of Philadelphia, and one other. By 1803 he had organized three more classes.

Albright had never given any indication that he was interested in forming a new organization or church, but in 1803, at the insistence of the leaders of his classes, he called a general meeting of the lay leaders and preachers for November 1803. Besides himself, two preachers and 14 lay leaders attended. The group drew up a license and the two pastors ordained Albright. The group wrote a brief statement of faith.

In 1806, a major revival movement spread throughout eastern Pennsylvania, affecting many religious groups. Albright's followers grew greatly. By 1807, when the newly organized, unnamed church held its first annual conference, the church had 220 members. Here Albright was elected bishop. He also assigned preachers and did what business was needed. The Conference also adopted the episcopal form of government, articles of faith and a book of discipline. Albright was asked to prepare a Book of Discipline.

== Death ==
The next year, weakened and in poor health from exhaustion and tuberculosis, Albright fell ill while traveling from Linglestown, Pennsylvania, northeast of Harrisburg. When he reached Kleinfeltersville (now part of Lebanon County), he could go no farther and there he died, May 18, 1808, at the age of 49. He was buried there in the Becker family plot. A chapel was built near the burial site and remains as a museum and memorial to Jacob Albright.

== Legacy ==
The movement did not take the name of Evangelical Association until after Jacob Albright's death. The family also changed their name to Albright. (Jacob Albright used the name Albrecht.) The church spread to various parts of the United States. In 1894 the Esher-Dubbs dispute occurred and 1/3 of the church left to form the United Evangelical Church. In 1923, most of the disputing congregations returned and the church was renamed the Evangelical Church. The remaining churches became the Evangelical Congregational Church. The Evangelical Church united in 1946 with the United Brethren in Christ (New Constitution) to form the Evangelical United Brethren Church (though those who dissented from the merger continued the Church of the United Brethren in Christ, which is active to the present day). The Evangelical United Brethren Church in turn united with the Methodist Church in 1968 to form the United Methodist Church (on the Evangelical United Brethren Church side, those who dissented from the merger organized the Evangelical Church, which is active to the present day).

The Evangelical churches have always believed in education for both men and women, forming educational institutions through the country. Two institutions have been named after Jacob Albright. Albright Seminary was established by the Pittsburgh Conference in Berlin, Pennsylvania in 1853 and lasted about 5 years. Albright College in Reading, Pennsylvania, formed by the merger of several Evangelical institutions, is a United Methodist affiliated school. One of the highest scholarships the college awards is the Jacob Albright Scholarship, which gives students a substantial stipend per year.

The main source for his life is a short biography written in 1811 by George Miller, an elder of the Evangelical Association. A biography of his evangelistic work, including experiences where he was rejected by his listeners, is entitled Jacob Albright: The Evangelical Pioneer written by Robert Sherer Wilson, A.B., Th. B., published by the Church Center Press of the Evangelical Congregational Church of Myerstown in 1940 at Myerstown, PA. Members of the Committee on Publishing Interests were the Rev. E. S. Woodring, the Rev. H. E. Messersmith and the Rev. G. A. Maurey.

The first doctrinal book Practical Christianity, written in 1811 by George Miller, was published in 1814 by twenty of Albright's followers known as "The Patrons of the First Edition" who financially supported the publication. The Albright people of Ohio included these seven: Adam Hennig and Frederick Schauer (first preachers of the Evangelical Church to Ohio), John Dreisbach, John Erb, Henry Niebel, John Klinefelter, and Jacob Klinefelter. "These patrons fathers constituted the vanguard of the gospel heralds who followed the westward streams of migration, bearing the missionary zeal and spirit of Jacob Albright".

== See also ==
- List of bishops of the United Methodist Church
- George Miller wrote the first biography of Jacob Albright and it is available in two English translations, one by George Edward Epp and the other by James D. Nelson. Written three years after Jacob Albirght's death, Miller uses the preacher's words as remembered by followers in telling about his spiritual journey.
