= Newmanstown, Pennsylvania =

Unincorporated community in Pennsylvania, US

- Census-designated place
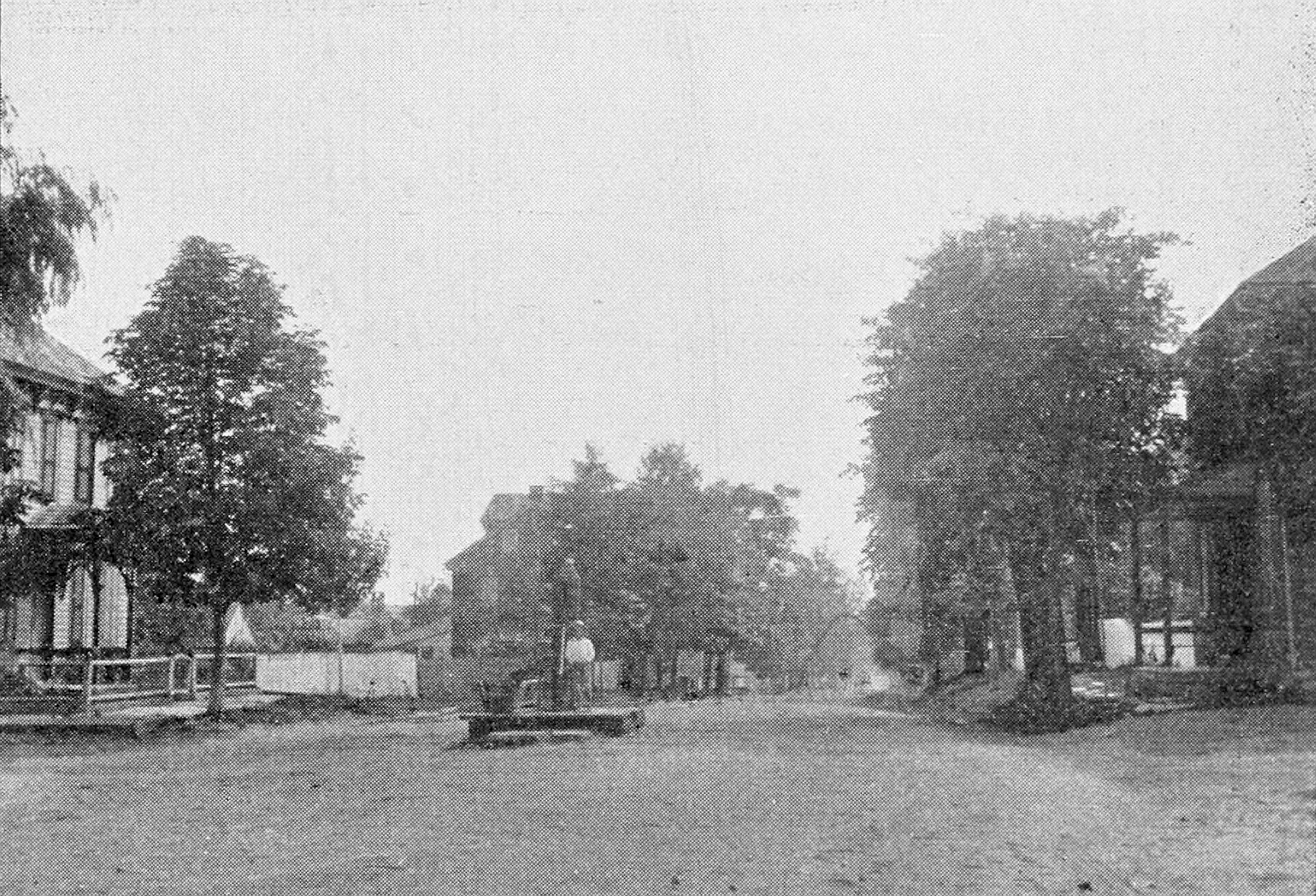
- Newmanstown in 1895

- Location in Pennsylvania Location in the United States
- Coordinates: 40°21′3″N 76°12′49″W
- Country: United States
- State: Pennsylvania
- County: Lebanon
- Township: Millcreek

Area
  - Total: 2.18 sq mi (5.64 km^{2})
  - Land: 2.18 sq mi (5.64 km^{2})
  - Water: 0 sq mi (0.00 km^{2})
- Elevation: 490 ft (150 m)

Population (2020)
  - Total: 2,834
  - Density: 1,300.4/sq mi (502.09/km^{2})
- Time zone: UTC-5 (Eastern (EST))
  - Summer (DST): UTC-4 (EDT)
- ZIP code: 17073
- Area code: 610
- FIPS code: 42-53856
- GNIS feature ID: 1182402

Newmanstown is an unincorporated community and census-designated place (CDP) in Millcreek Township, Lebanon County, Pennsylvania. The population was 2,478 at the 2010 census, an increase over the figure of 1,536 tabulated in 2000.

== Geography ==
Newmanstown is in southeastern Lebanon County along the northeastern edge of Millcreek Township. It is bordered to the northeast by Marion Township and Heidelberg Township in Berks County. Route 419 runs through the center of town as Main Street, leading northeast 2 miles (3 km) to Womelsdorf and southwest 6 miles (10 km) to Schaefferstown. Lebanon, the county seat, is 12 miles (19 km) to the west of Newmanstown, and Reading is 16 miles (26 km) to the east.

According to the United States Census Bureau, the Newmanstown CDP has a total area of 2.2 square miles (5.7 km^{2}), all land. Mill Creek, which drains northward into Tulpehocken Creek, a tributary of the Schuylkill River, runs along the west side of the town.

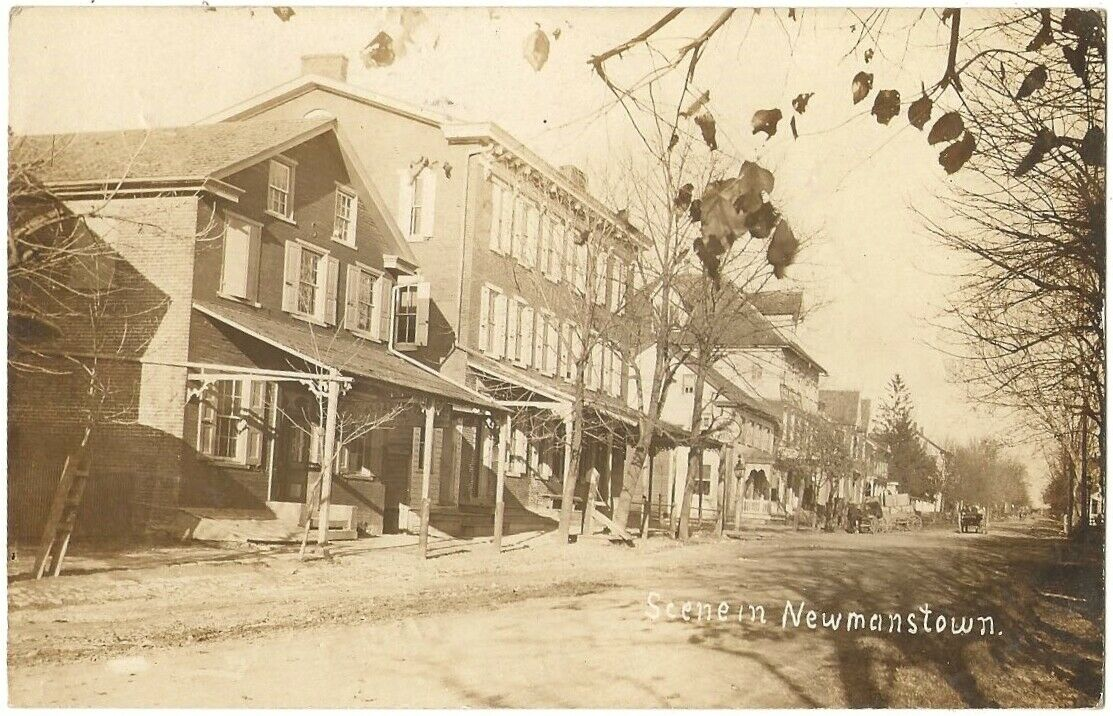
Newsmanstown view of 1911

== Demographics ==
Historical population
Census	Pop.	Note	%±
2020	2,834		—
U.S. Decennial Census

As of the 2000 census, there were 1,536 people, 603 households, and 417 families residing in the CDP. The population density was 702.3 inhabitants per square mile (271.2/km^{2}). There were 635 housing units at an average density of 290.3 per square mile (112.1/km^{2}). The racial makeup of the CDP was 98.05% White, 0.52% African American, 0.26% Asian, 0.52% from other races, and 0.65% from two or more races. Hispanic or Latino of any race were 1.56% of the population.

There were 603 households, out of which 33.0% had children under the age of 18 living with them, 55.7% were married couples living together, 8.0% had a female householder with no husband present, and 30.7% were non-families. 25.2% of all households were made up of individuals, and 12.6% had someone living alone who was 65 years of age or older. The average household size was 2.53 and the average family size was 3.05.

In the CDP, the population was spread out, with 25.5% under the age of 18, 7.1% from 18 to 24, 30.5% from 25 to 44, 23.2% from 45 to 64, and 13.6% who were 65 years of age or older. The median age was 37 years. For every 100 females, there were 98.7 males. For every 100 females age 18 and over, there were 96.6 males.

The median income for a household in the CDP was $43,098, and the median income for a family was $47,308. Males had a median income of $29,280 versus $21,759 for females. The per capita income for the CDP was $18,284. About 1.8% of families and 3.3% of the population were below the poverty line, including 4.7% of those under age 18 and 4.7% of those age 65 or over.
