= Heidelberg Township, Lebanon County, Pennsylvania =

Township in Pennsylvania, US

Coordinates: 40°18′00″N 76°16′59″W

- Township
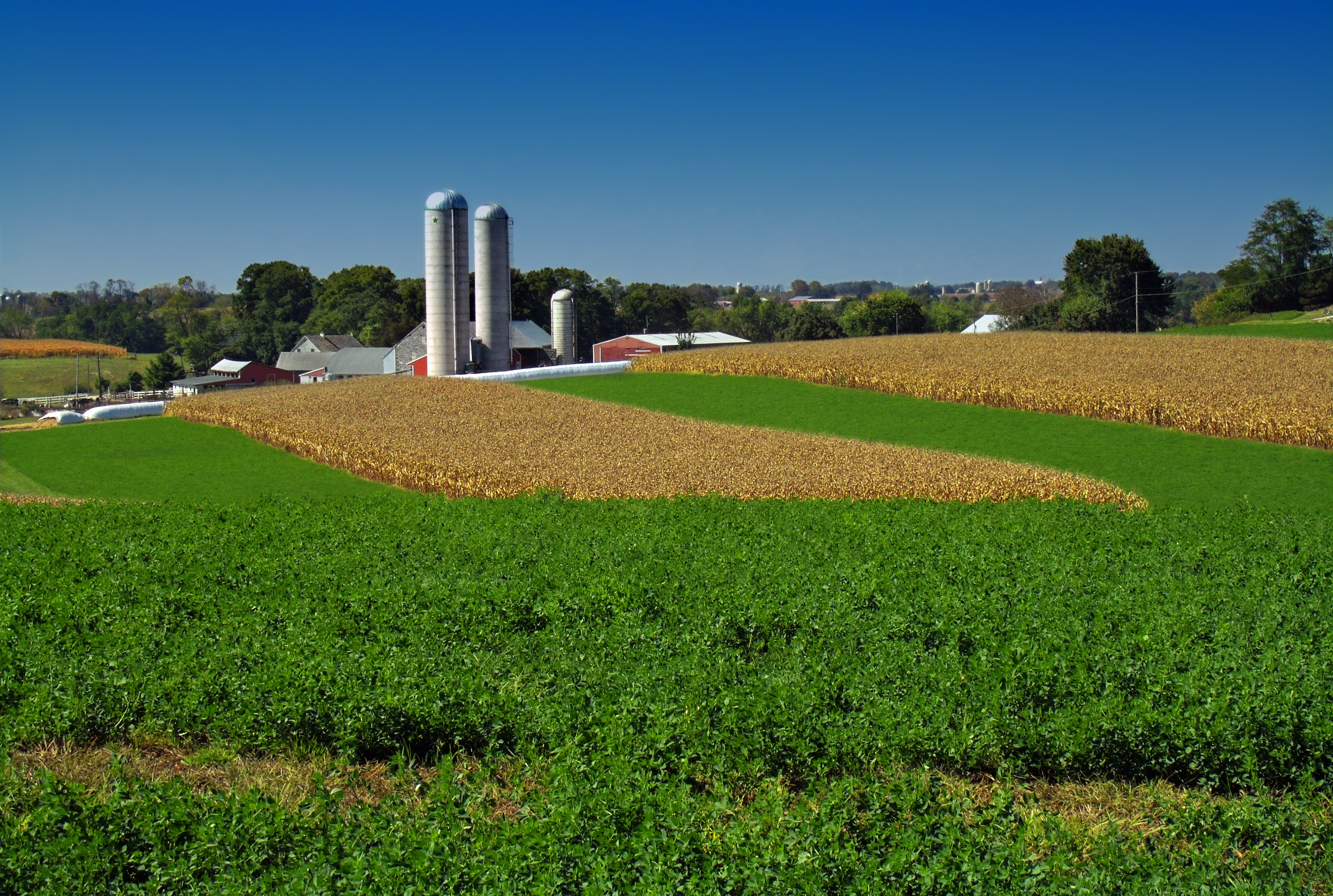
- A farm in the township

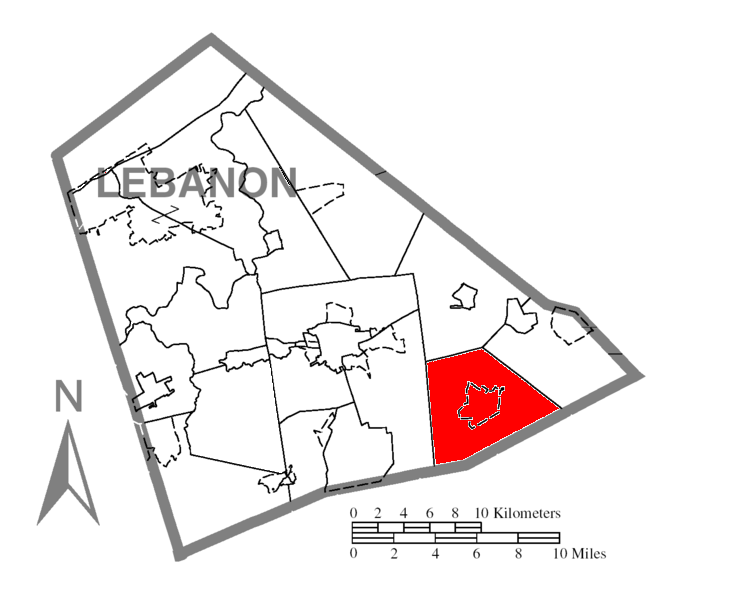
- Location in Lebanon County, Pennsylvania

- Location of Lebanon County in Pennsylvania
- Country: United States
- State: Pennsylvania
- County: Lebanon
- Settled: 1720
- Incorporated: 1757

Area
  - Total: 24.25 sq mi (62.80 km^{2})
  - Land: 24.24 sq mi (62.77 km^{2})
  - Water: 0.012 sq mi (0.03 km^{2})

Population (2020)
  - Total: 4,080 ▲
  - Estimate (2021): 4,060
  - Density: 173.4/sq mi (66.96/km^{2})
- Time zone: UTC-5 (Eastern (EST))
  - Summer (DST): UTC-4 (EDT)
- Area code: 717
- FIPS code: 42-075-33608
- Website: heidelbergtownship.com

Historical population
Census	Pop.	Note	%±
2000	2,858		—
2010	4,069		42.4%
2020	4,080		0.3%
2021 (est.)	4,060		−0.5%
U.S. Decennial Census

Heidelberg Township is a township in Lebanon County, Pennsylvania, United States. The population was 4,080 at the 2020 census. It is part of the Lebanon, Pennsylvania Metropolitan Statistical Area.

== History ==
Bomberger's Distillery was added to the National Register of Historic Places in 1975, and designated a National Historic Landmark in 1980. According to the images of the Google Earth, the buildings of the distillery have been demolished in the last few years.

== Geography ==
According to the United States Census Bureau, the township has a total area of 24.2 square miles (63 km^{2}), of which 24.2 square miles (63 km^{2}) is land and 0.04% is water. Schaefferstown is a census-designated place in the center of the township, and Kleinfeltersville is in the east. Waldeck is a small community in the south of the township.

== Demographics ==
As of the census of 2000, there were 3,832 people, 1,346 households, and 1,066 families residing in the township. The population density was 158.5 inhabitants per square mile (61.2/km^{2}). There were 1,389 housing units at an average density of 57.4 units per square mile (22.2 units/km^{2}). The racial makeup of the township was 99.30% White, 0.21% African American, 0.18% Asian, 0.13% from other races, and 0.18% from two or more races. Hispanic or Latino of any race were 0.37% of the population.

There were 1,346 households, out of which 33.9% had children under the age of 18 living with them, 71.5% were married couples living together, 5.4% had a female householder with no husband present, and 20.8% were non-families. 17.9% of all households were made up of individuals, and 8.0% had someone living alone who was 65 years of age or older. The average household size was 2.85 and the average family size was 3.24.

In the township the population was spread out, with 27.5% under the age of 18, 8.7% from 18 to 24, 24.1% from 25 to 44, 26.4% from 45 to 64, and 13.3% who were 65 years of age or older. The median age was 38 years. For every 100 females, there were 100.2 males. For every 100 females age 18 and over, there were 99.4 males.

The median income for a household in the township was $45,917, and the median income for a family was $50,205. Males had a median income of $34,432 versus $25,911 for females. The per capita income for the township was $21,064. About 4.1% of families and 6.5% of the population were below the poverty line, including 13.6% of those under age 18 and 2.4% of those age 65 or over.
