= Schaefferstown, Pennsylvania =

Unincorporated community in Pennsylvania, US

Schaefferstown, Pennsylvania Schaefferschteddel
- Census-designated place
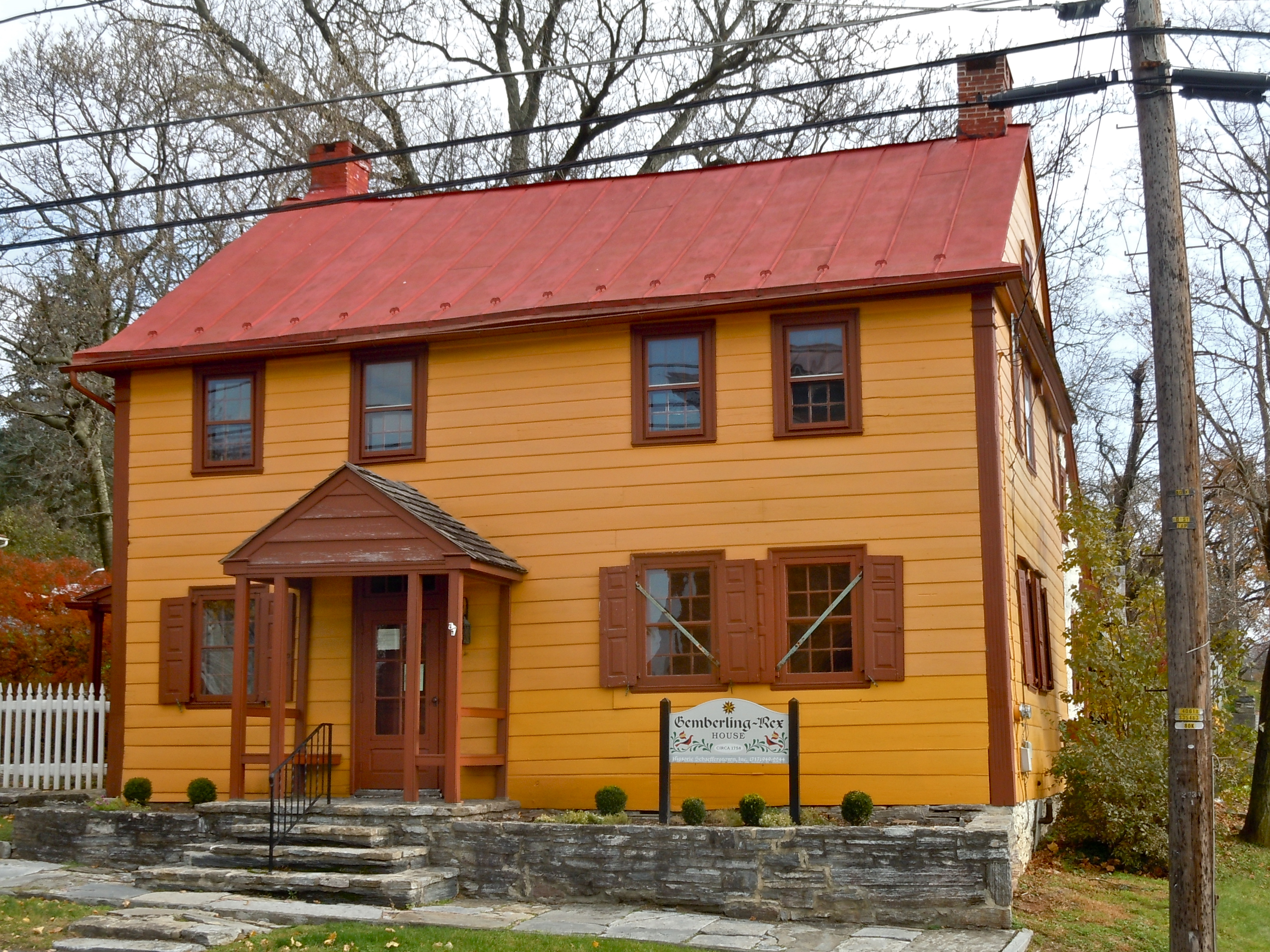
- The Gemberling - Rex House

- Location in Pennsylvania Location in the United States
- Coordinates: 40°17′42″N 76°17′43″W
- Country: United States
- State: Pennsylvania
- County: Lebanon
- Township: Heidelberg

Area
  - Total: 2.68 sq mi (6.95 km^{2})
  - Land: 2.68 sq mi (6.95 km^{2})
- Elevation: 585 ft (178 m)

Population (2010)
  - Total: 941
  - Density: 350/sq mi (135.3/km^{2})
- Time zone: UTC-5 (Eastern (EST))
  - Summer (DST): UTC-4 (EDT)
- ZIP codes: 17088
- Area code: 717
- FIPS code: 42-68144
- GNIS feature ID: 1214011

Schaefferstown (Pennsylvania German: Schaefferschteddel) is an unincorporated community and census-designated place (CDP) in Heidelberg Township, Lebanon County, Pennsylvania, United States. The population was 941 at the 2010 census.

== History ==
Schaefferstown is one of the oldest towns in Lebanon County (which was formed from parts of Dauphin County and Lancaster County in 1813), being at least a century older than the county itself. It is the main town in Heidelberg Township. Although the exact date of the first settlers is unknown, it is certain that they settled here before 1725. Those first settlers were believed to have been German Jews though no physical evidence of their presence in the area that would become Schaefferstown exists. It is said twenty or so Jewish traders lived in the area in a place known as Lebanon Trading Post. An old Jewish burial ground is said to have been situated about a quarter mile south of Tower Hill and almost a hundred yards east of South Market Street in Schaefferstown.

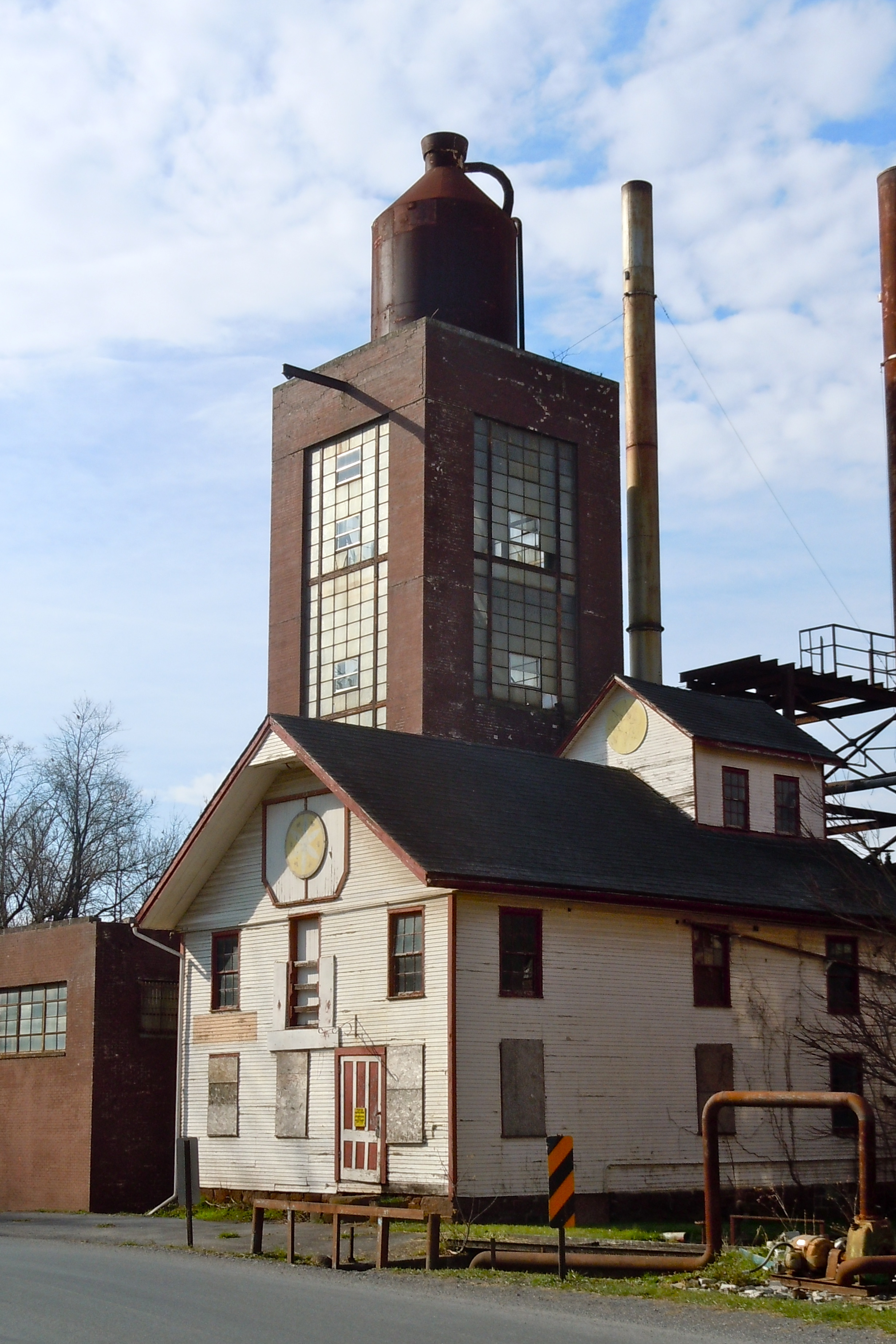
Bomberger's Distillery in 2011

Brendle Farms, Philip Erpff House, and Rex House are listed on the National Register of Historic Places. Bomberger's Distillery, also listed, was located near Schaefferstown. The buildings of the distillery were demolished. The Schaeffer House was added to the National Register of Historic Places and designated a National Historic Landmark in 2011. Other historic buildings include the extravagant Second Empire style Weigley Mansion. Schaefferstown also hosts three museums: The Alexander Schaeffer House and Farm, Gemberling-Rex House and the Thomas R. Brendle Museum.

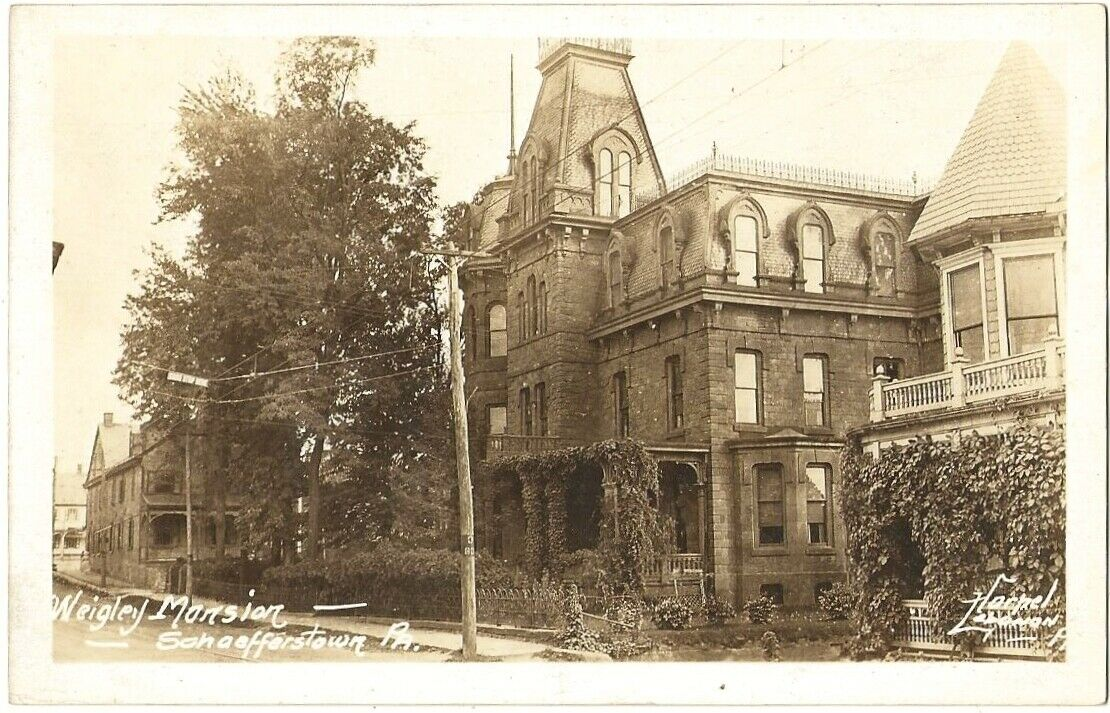
Weigley Mansion in Schaefferstown, PA on real photo postcard sent in 1921

== Geography ==
Schaefferstown is in southeastern Lebanon County, in the center of Heidelberg Township. Pennsylvania Route 897 passes through the center of town, leading east 14 miles (23 km) to Swartzville and northwest 7 miles (11 km) to Lebanon, the county seat. Pennsylvania Route 501 passes through the west side of the community, leading north 5 miles (8 km) to Myerstown and south 10 miles (16 km) to Lititz. Pennsylvania Route 419 follows PA 897 through the center of Schaefferstown, leading northeast 8 miles (13 km) to Womelsdorf and west-southwest 6 miles (10 km) to Cornwall.

According to the United States Census Bureau, the Schaefferstown CDP has a total area of 2.7 square miles (7.0 km^{2}), all land. Most of the community drains south to Hammer Creek, a tributary of Cocalico Creek and part of the Conestoga River watershed flowing to the Susquehanna. The northernmost part of the CDP drains toward Tulpehocken Creek, a tributary of the Schuylkill River and part of the Delaware River watershed.

Schaefferstown is home to Fountain Park, the oldest chartered waterworks still in operation in the United States.

== Demographics ==
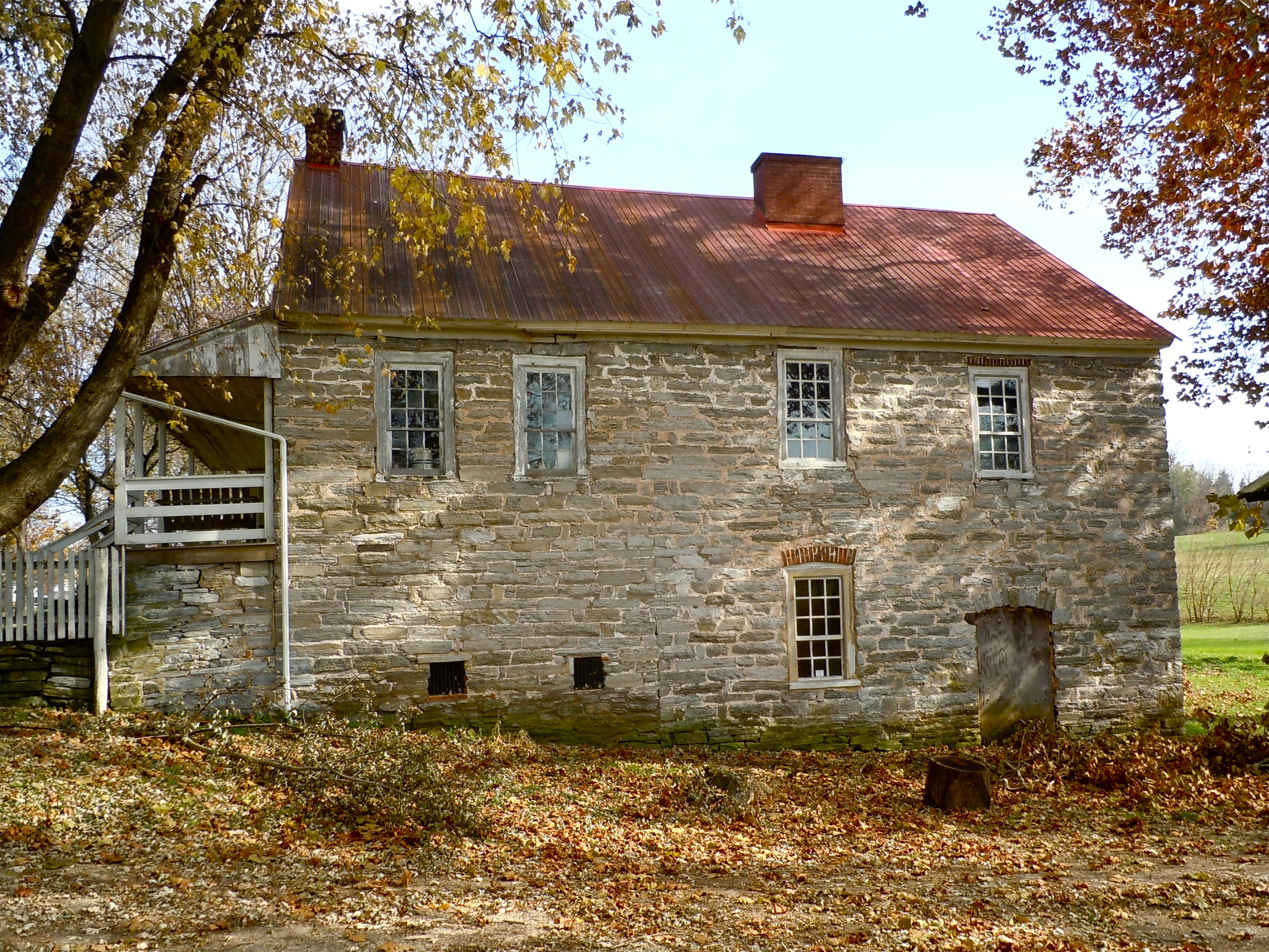
Schaeffer House

As of the census of 2000, there were 984 people, 374 households, and 286 families residing in the CDP. The population density was 365.8 inhabitants per square mile (141.2/km^{2}). There were 386 housing units at an average density of 143.5 per square mile (55.4/km^{2}). The racial makeup of the CDP was 99.29% White, 0.51% African American, 0.10% Asian, 0.10% from other races. Hispanic or Latino of any race were 0.20% of the population.

There were 374 households, out of which 31.8% had children under the age of 18 living with them, 67.4% were married couples living together, 6.7% had a female householder with no husband present, and 23.3% were non-families. 20.6% of all households were made up of individuals, and 9.4% had someone living alone who was 65 years of age or older. The average household size was 2.63 and the average family size was 3.04.

In the CDP, the population was spread out, with 24.8% under the age of 18, 8.8% from 18 to 24, 23.7% from 25 to 44, 28.0% from 45 to 64, and 14.6% who were 65 years of age or older. The median age was 39 years. For every 100 females, there were 99.2 males. For every 100 females age 18 and over, there were 96.3 males.

The median income for a household in the CDP was $43,542, and the median income for a family was $52,609. Males had a median income of $31,625 versus $26,528 for females. The per capita income for the CDP was $29,176. About 2.0% of families and 5.7% of the population were below the poverty line, including 20.3% of those under age 18 and none of those age 65 or over.

== Fountain Park ==
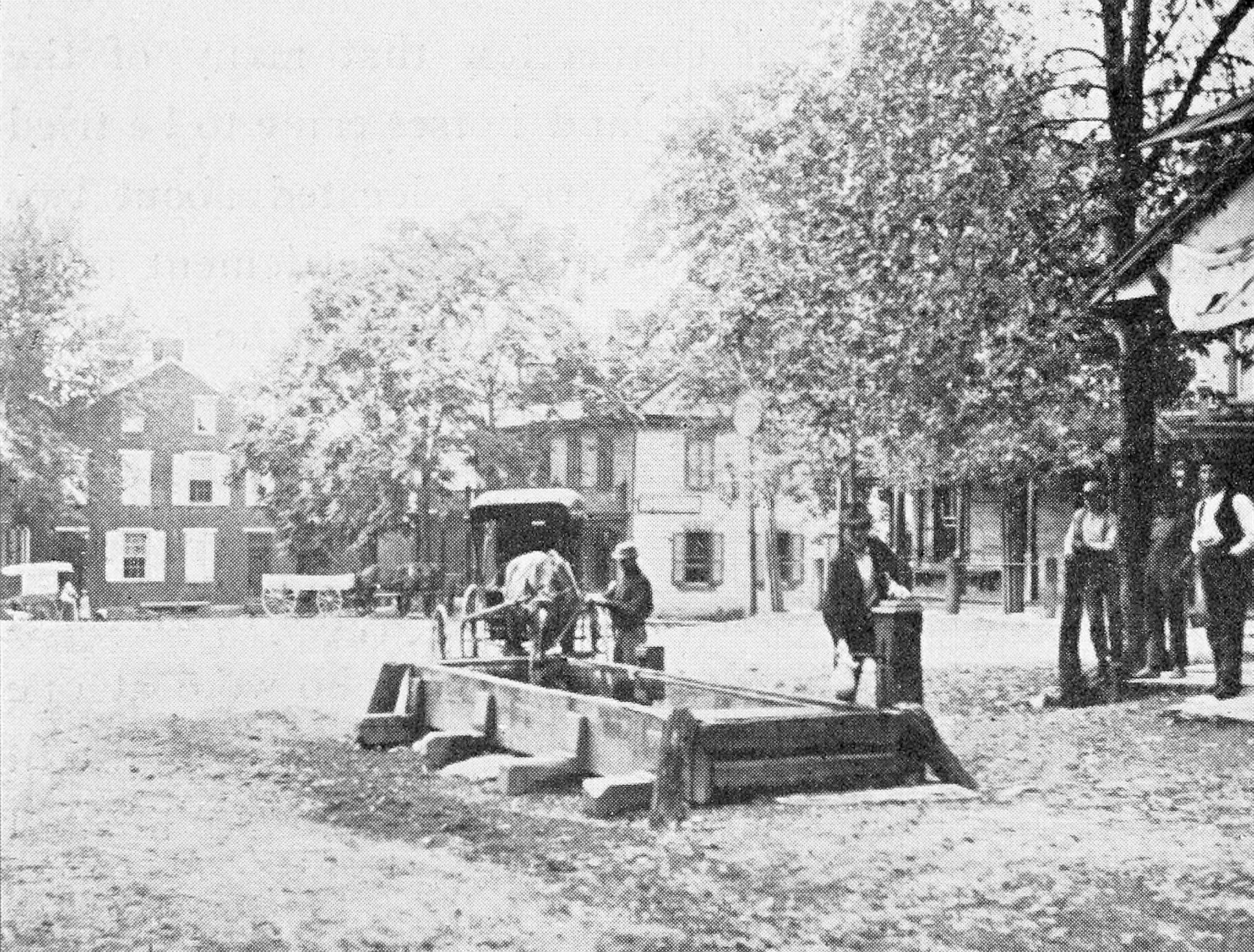
Watering trough on Market Square, 1895

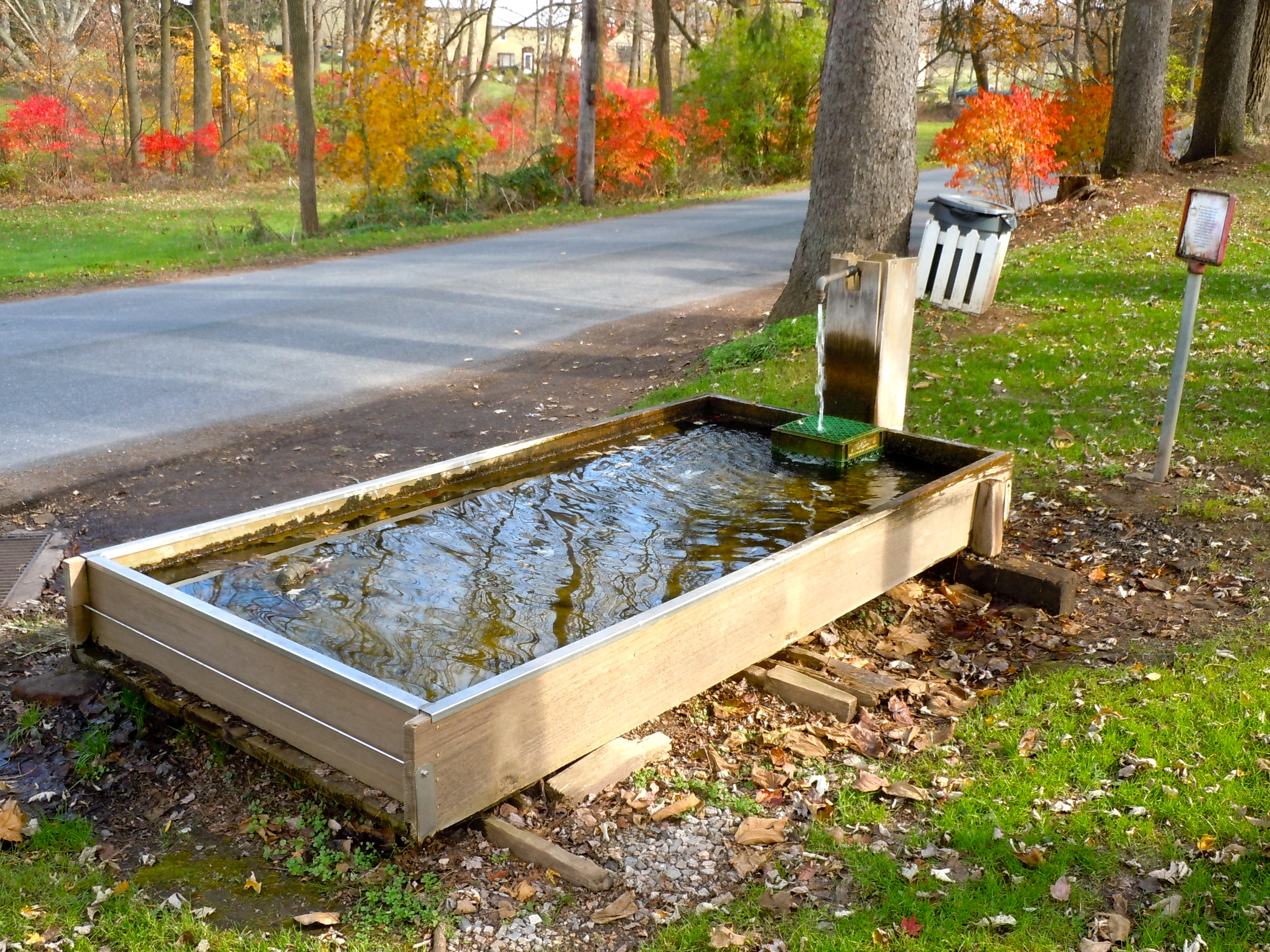
Fountain Park

The water company in Schaefferstown has the oldest gravitational conveyance system by underground pipes in the United States. The water system was constructed sometime between 1744 and 1750 by the founder of the town, Alexander Schaeffer. The water system, which is located in the area now known as Fountain Park, is still used by the townspeople for potable household water. When the original system was laid out, it ran to two wooden troughs on the Square, which is now the intersection of Main Street and Market Street. One trough was since replaced by Matilda Zimmerman in memory of Mary Rex Zimmerman, her mother and great granddaughter of Alexander Schaeffer. This trough is now located on the south face of the historic bank located within the Square.

== Fire/EMS protection ==
Residents of Heidelberg Township are served by the Schaefferstown Volunteer Fire Co. and Schaefferstown EMS. Both the fire company and the EMS are volunteer only and rely on the donations from the people of Schaefferstown. The fire department has 24/7 coverage by four different pieces of apparatus: Rescue 35, Engine 35, Tanker 35, and Brush 35. The fire department has active fire police officers. Most of the fire police volunteers have certified training.

Schaefferstown EMS houses one ambulance (Ambulance 160) with 24/7 coverage. Schaefferstown EMS is a Basic Life Support (BLS) company, but is covered with Advanced Life Support (ALS) by First Aid and Safety Patrol of Lebanon, PA. Schaefferstown EMS also has volunteer ALS members. Schaefferstown EMS serves Heidelberg Township and portions of South Lebanon Township.

== Notable people ==
- Moses Dissinger, Pennsylvania German clergyman
- Johann Henrich Otto, fraktur artist
