= Biver =

Biver may refer to:

== People ==
- Bob Biver (born 1985), Luxembourgish alpine skier
- Jean-Claude Biver (born 1949), Luxembourgish businessman
- René Biver (1920–1983), Luxembourgish cyclist

== Other uses ==
- Biever House, a United States national historic site
- 26969 Biver, a minor planet
- Biver Banca, an Italian savings bank
- JC Biver, a Swiss watchmaker

== See also ==
- Biever, a surname
