= Russ Diamond =

American politician

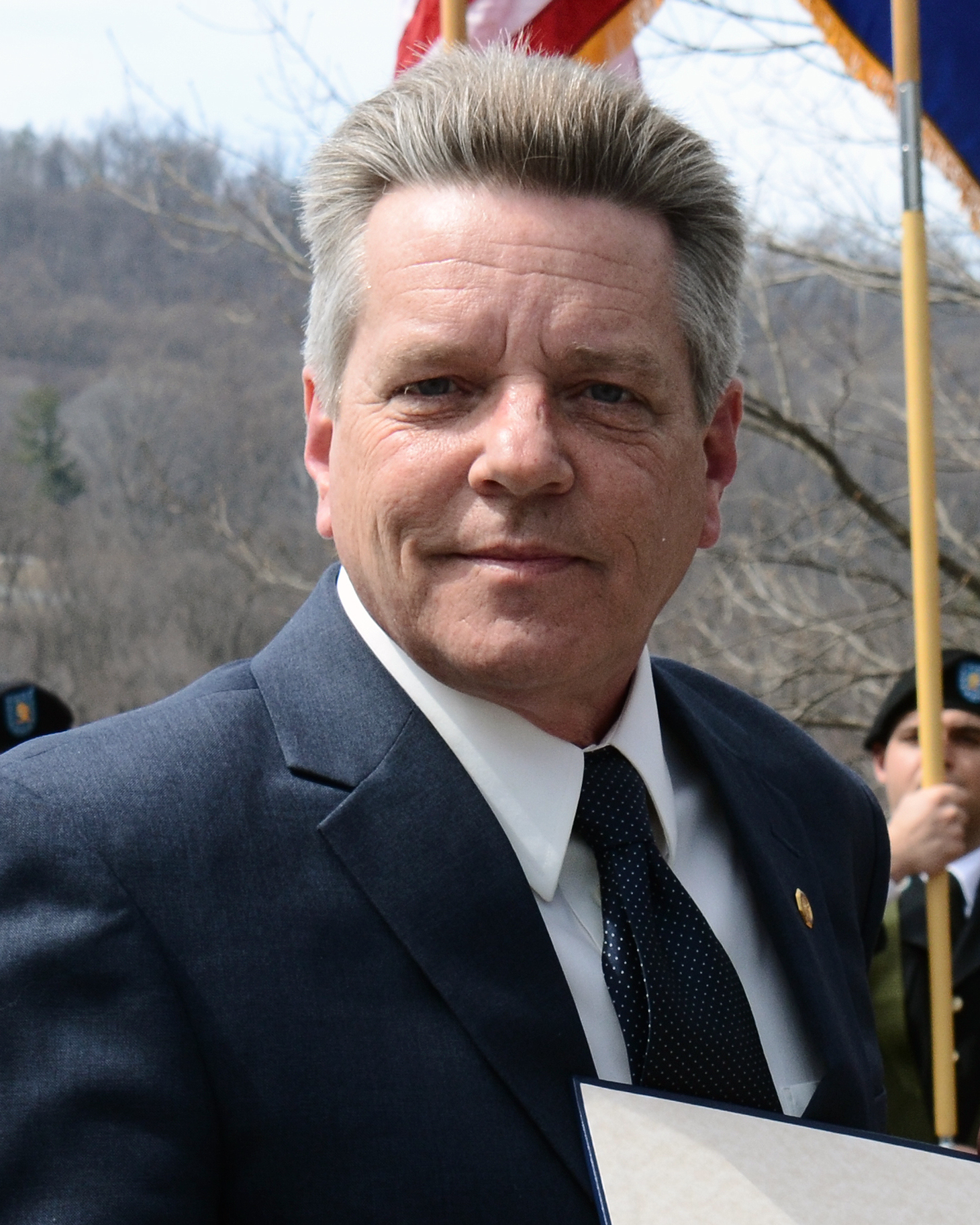
- Diamond in 2015

Member of the Pennsylvania House of Representatives from the 102nd district
- Incumbent
- Assumed office January 6, 2015
- Preceded by: RoseMarie Swanger

Personal details
- Born: July 26, 1963 (age 62) Hershey, Pennsylvania, U.S.
- Party: Republican
- Website: www.repdiamond.com

Russell H. Diamond (born July 26, 1963) is an American politician and businessman from Pennsylvania. Following a string of unsuccessful runs for various offices, he was elected to the Pennsylvania House of Representatives for the 102nd District in 2014.

== Business career ==
Diamond owned Raintree Multimedia, a CD and DVD duplication company based in Annville, and was later an over-the-road truck driver employed by Millis Transfer Inc.

== Political career ==
Diamond describes himself as a conservative Republican. His political career has coincided with a shift in the Pennsylvania Republican Party further to the right wing.

=== Political activism and unsuccessful campaigns, 2005-13 ===
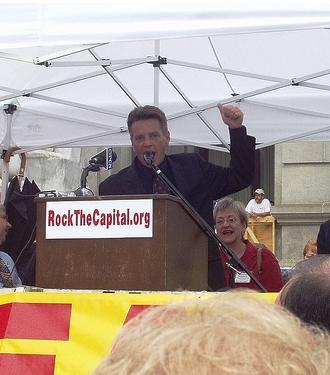
Diamond at a CleansweepPA rally in Harrisburg, 2005

In 2005, after the state legislature voted itself a pay raise, Diamond created PACleanSweep.com, a Web-based political action committee dedicated to ousting every incumbent legislator in the state. The anti-incumbency movement played a role in the ouster of a Pennsylvania Supreme Court justice and in the defeat of 17 incumbent state legislators in primary elections.

Between 2004 and 2014, Diamond launched six failed campaigns for elected office:

- In 2004, he ran simultaneously for the U.S. House of Representatives (from the Pennsylvania's 17th congressional district) and the state house (for the 101st Legislative District) as a Libertarian Party candidate. He was defeated in both races, receiving 1.98% and 16.52% of the vote, respectively, losing the state House seat to Republican incumbent Mauree Gingrich.
- In 2006, Diamond launched an independent campaign for governor. Diamond abandoned his run when he fell well short of the signature requirements to qualify for the ballot. In March 2006, five board members of PACleanSweep, of which Diamond was the chair, resigned after learning that Diamond sought the governorship; the members said that Diamond was trying to co-opt the movement for his own ambition. A legal battle in Lebanon County court resulted between Diamond and the organization's dissident faction over who had rightful ownership over the group's website and assets and who was the legitimate chairman of the organization.
- In 2008, Diamond challenged Republican incumbent Gingrich for the 101st district seat in the Pennsylvania state House. The campaign was acrimonious, with Gingrich calling Diamond unfit for office over comments he made regarding police. Gingrich won with 64.53% of the vote, Diamond received 22.93%, and Bruce Kreider 12.54%.
- In 2010, Diamond unsuccessfully sought the Republican nomination for lieutenant governor. Diamond lost, receiving 4.49% of the vote, and seventh place out of a nine-candidate field.

=== State House career, 2014-present ===
==== Elections ====
In 2014, Diamond successfully ran for the 102nd district (Note: The district covers western Lebanon County, specifically Cleona, Jonestown, Myerstown, and Richland boroughs and Annville, Bethel, Heidelberg, Jackson, Millcreek, North Lebanon, South Lebanon, Swatara, Union, and West Lebanon townships.) to replace Representative RoseMarie Swanger, who spent four terms in the state House after being backed by Diamond's organization. The campaign was contentious; Diamond's supporters filed legal challenges against the campaigns of Joe Eisenhauer and Wanda Bechtold, who sought the Republican nomination, and successfully got their names removed from the primary ballot (due to a failure to timely file financial disclosure forms and a failure to obtain enough signatures, respectively). As a result of these challenges, Diamond was the only candidate on the ballot in the May primary, although Bechtold ran an unsuccessful write-in campaign. Diamond won the general election with 45 percent of the vote, defeating Democrat Jake Long (who received 26%), independent Robert McAteer (who received almost 23% of the vote), and write-in candidate Bechtold. (Both McAteer and Bechtold indicated that they would serve as Republicans if elected.) Diamond won reelection in 2016 with 70% of the vote, won reelection unopposed in 2018, and won reelection in 2020 with 70.8% of the vote.

=== Tenure and controversies ===
==== COVID-19 ====
In 2020, during the COVID-19 pandemic, Diamond opposed public-health measures to prevent the spread of the virus. Diamond opposed Governor Tom Wolf's statewide mandate requiring the wearing of face coverings in indoor public places (saying that the order promoted "hatred and intolerance across Pennsylvania"), opposed Wolf's closure of non-essential businesses, and called on Wolf to fire Dr. Rachel Levine, the Pennsylvania secretary of health. Diamond spoke at anti-shutdown rallies at the State Capitol and sponsored a resolution seeking to reverse Wolf's closure of nonessential businesses; the resolution passed the Pennsylvania General Assembly, but the Pennsylvania Supreme Court ruled that it had no effect. In May 2020, Diamond bragged on social media about shopping without a face covering. In July 2020, Diamond mocked a statement against discrimination against LGBT people issued by Levine, who is transgender, by copying-and-pasting her statement and replacing the term "LGBTQ" with the word "unmasked" to allege discrimination against what he called the "unmasked community" (people who refuse to wear masks during the COVID-19 pandemic). Governor Tom Wolf condemned Diamond's statement and said, "We need the Republicans to stop spreading misinformation to the general public, and we badly need them to be more responsible and more responsive to the health and wellbeing of all Pennsylvanians. This dangerous, reckless behavior is not welcome in Pennsylvania." Wolf called for the legislature to censure Diamond over the statement, but the Republican-controlled legislature chose not to do so.

==== Scheme to overturn the results of the 2020 Presidential Election ====
On December 4, 2020, John Eastman, a Trump adviser, law professor, and senior member of the conservative legal group, the Federalist Society, emailed to Diamond instructions for an illegal scheme to allow Pennsylvania's legislature to award Pennsylvania's electoral votes to Trump, despite Trump having lost the state by over 80,000 votes. Politico published the email in May, 2022. Diamond was one of 26 Pennsylvania House Republicans who called for the state's certification of presidential electors to be withdrawn and supported a resolution calling on Congress to consider Pennsylvania electors to be "in dispute."

The resolution echoed Donald Trump's baseless claims of election fraud and his unsuccessful attempt to overturn the election results. Diamond made his call even after litigation brought by Trump's campaign were dismissed due to lack of evidence. Diamond also joined eight other Republican state representatives, led by Daryl Metcalfe, who filed a lawsuit asking a Pennsylvania court to invalidate the state's final vote count; this claim was based on debunked conspiracy theories and claims that had already been rejected by state and federal courts in earlier litigation. The suit was swiftly dismissed.

In 2019 and 2020, Diamond proposed amendments to the Pennsylvania Constitution that would eliminate statewide elections for state appellate judges (the judges of the Pennsylvania Supreme Court, Commonwealth Court, and Superior Court) would no longer be elected in statewide elections, but would be instead by elected by districts. If adopted, the proposal would tilt the composition of the courts in favor of Republicans. The Republican-controlled General Assembly advanced the proposal for geographic districts for state supreme court districts, on a largely party-line vote, with all Democrats and a few Republicans opposed.

=== Unsuccessful statewide run ===
Diamond unsuccessfully sought the Republican nomination for Pennsylvania lieutenant governor in 2022. In the May 2022 primary election, he received 5.94% of the vote, carrying only one county (his home county, Lebanon).

2022 Republican primary, Pennsylvania lieutenant governor
Party	Candidate	Votes	%
Republican	Carrie DelRosso	318,537	25.66
Republican	Richard Saccone	195,171	15.72
Republican	Theodore Daniels	150,749	12.14
Republican	Clarice D. Schillinger	147,705	11.90
Republican	Jeffrey H. Coleman	125,059	10.07
Republican	James E. Jones	113,183	9.12
Republican	Russell H. Diamond	73,751	5.94
Republican	John A. Brown	58,961	4.75
Republican	Christopher C. Frye, Jr.	58,403	4.70
Total votes			100.00%

== Protection from abuse orders and public drunkenness citation ==
Two women filed for and were granted protection from abuse (PFA) orders against Diamond in 2002 (Diamond's former wife) and 2013 (a woman who lived with and dated Diamond), respectively. Court documents state that one woman claimed Diamond "pushed her in the face seven times and scratched her under an eye" and "threatened to kill her if she disconnected the cable". The second woman to file for a PFA against Diamond told the courts that when she wouldn't leave his apartment, "he knocked her down and dragged her to the doorway." Diamond was later fined $200 for violating the second order. In 2014, members of the Lebanon County Republican Committee sent Diamond a letter asking him to withdraw from the race for House of Representatives, citing his "string of unsuccessful runs for office" and the apparent history of violence evidenced in court documents. Diamond responded by saying that "all is fair in love, war and politics" and "Let's not cherry-pick just to make the other guy look bad." Pennsylvania State Senator David Arnold Jr. (also a member of the Lebanon County Republican Committee) said that Diamond had engaged in a "disturbing pattern of behavior" in which he "admits no culpability and makes light of it." Speaking on the state House floor in 2018, Diamond said that he felt the orders against him were unwarranted and contended that PFA orders were "weaponized"; he voted against a bill that would require persons subject to protective orders and persons convicted of misdemeanor crimes of domestic violence to surrender their guns to police officers, gun dealers, or an attorney.

In fall 2015, Diamond was cited for public drunkenness in Annville Township. He subsequently acknowledged that he is an alcoholic.

== Health ==
In June 2022, Diamond was diagnosed with "treatable" prostate cancer.
