= Pennsylvania House of Representatives, District 102 =

American legislative district

Coordinates: 40.413°N 76.541°W

Pennsylvania's 102nd State House of Representatives district
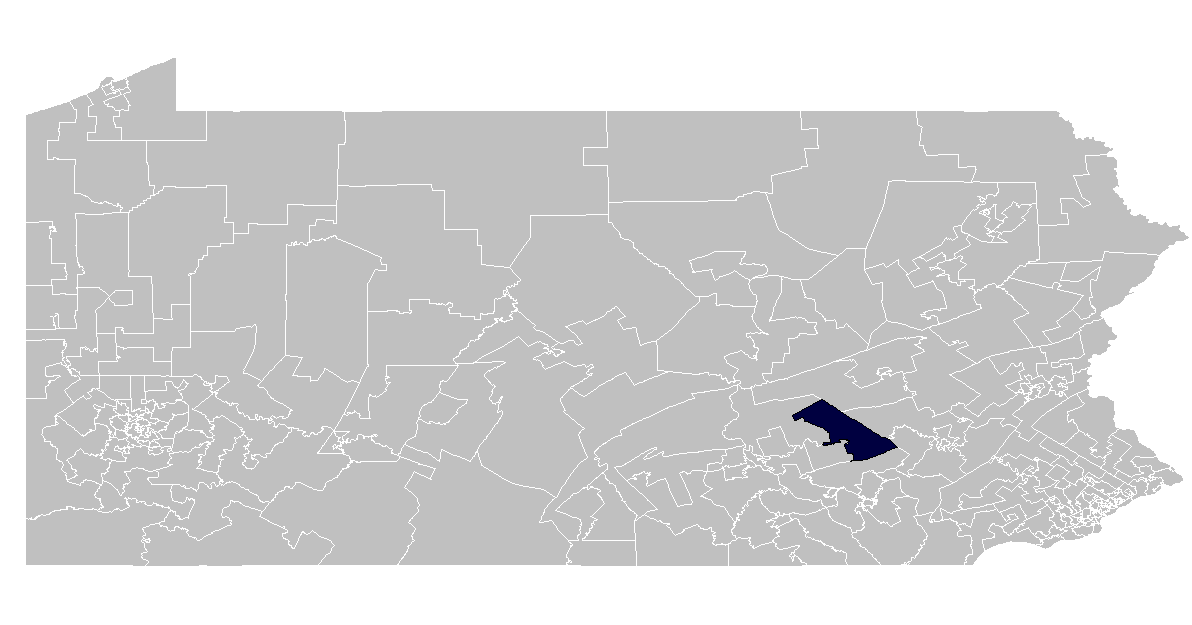
Representative
Russ Diamond; R–Annville Township
- Demographics: 91.2% White; 1.2% Black; 4.1% Hispanic
- Population (2011) • Citizens of voting age: 63,843; 49,129

Russ Diamond has been the Representative of the 102nd district since 2015. The 102nd Pennsylvania House of Representatives District is located in Lebanon County and includes the following areas:

- Annville Township
- Bethel Township
- Cleona
- Heidelberg Township
- Jackson Township
- Jonestown
- Millcreek Township
- Myerstown
- North Lebanon Township
- Richland
- South Lebanon Township
- Swatara Township
- Union Township
- West Lebanon Township

== Representatives ==
Representative	Party	Years	District home	Note
Prior to 1969, seats were apportioned by county.
Harvey L. Nitrauer	Republican	1969 – 1970		
Robert C. Rowe	Republican	1971 – 1974		
Nicholas B. Moehlmann	Republican	1975 – 1990		
Ed Arnold	Democrat	1991 – 1992		
Peter J. Zug	Republican	1993 – 2006		
RoseMarie Swanger	Republican	2007 – 2014	Jonestown	
Russ Diamond	Republican	2015 –	Annville Township	Incumbent

== Recent election results ==
PA House election, 2010: Pennsylvania House, District 102
Party	Candidate	Votes	%	±%
Republican	Rosemarie Swanger	18,871	100	
Turnout		18,871	100	

PA House election, 2012: Pennsylvania House, District 102
Party	Candidate	Votes	%	±%
Republican	Rosemarie Swanger	24,532	100	
Turnout		24,532	100	

PA House election, 2014: Pennsylvania House, District 102
Party	Candidate	Votes	%	±%
Republican	Russ Diamond	7,668	48	
Democratic	Jake Long	4,446	27.83	
Margin of victory		3,222	20.17	
Turnout		15,975	100	

PA House election, 2016: Pennsylvania House, District 102
Party	Candidate	Votes	%	±%
Republican	Russ Diamond	19,858	69.91	
Democratic	Jacob H. Long	8,549	30.09	
Margin of victory		11,309	39.82	
Turnout		28,407	100	
