= Bobby Rowe =

Bobby or Bob Rowe may refer to:

- Bobby Rowe (ice hockey) (1885–1948), Canadian ice hockey defenceman
- Bobby Rowe (Australian footballer) (1883–1958), Australian rules footballer
- Bobby Rowe (1934–2022), rodeo producer featured in Borat: Cultural Learnings of America for Make Benefit Glorious Nation of Kazakhstan
- Bob Rowe (American football) (born 1945), former American football defensive lineman in the National Football League
- Bob Rowe (musician) (born 1954), American musician

== See also ==
- Robert Rowe (born 1938), Pennsylvania politician
- Robert A. Roe (1924–2014), New Jersey politician
