= Annville Historic District =

Historic district in Pennsylvania, United States

- U.S. National Register of Historic Places
- U.S. Historic district
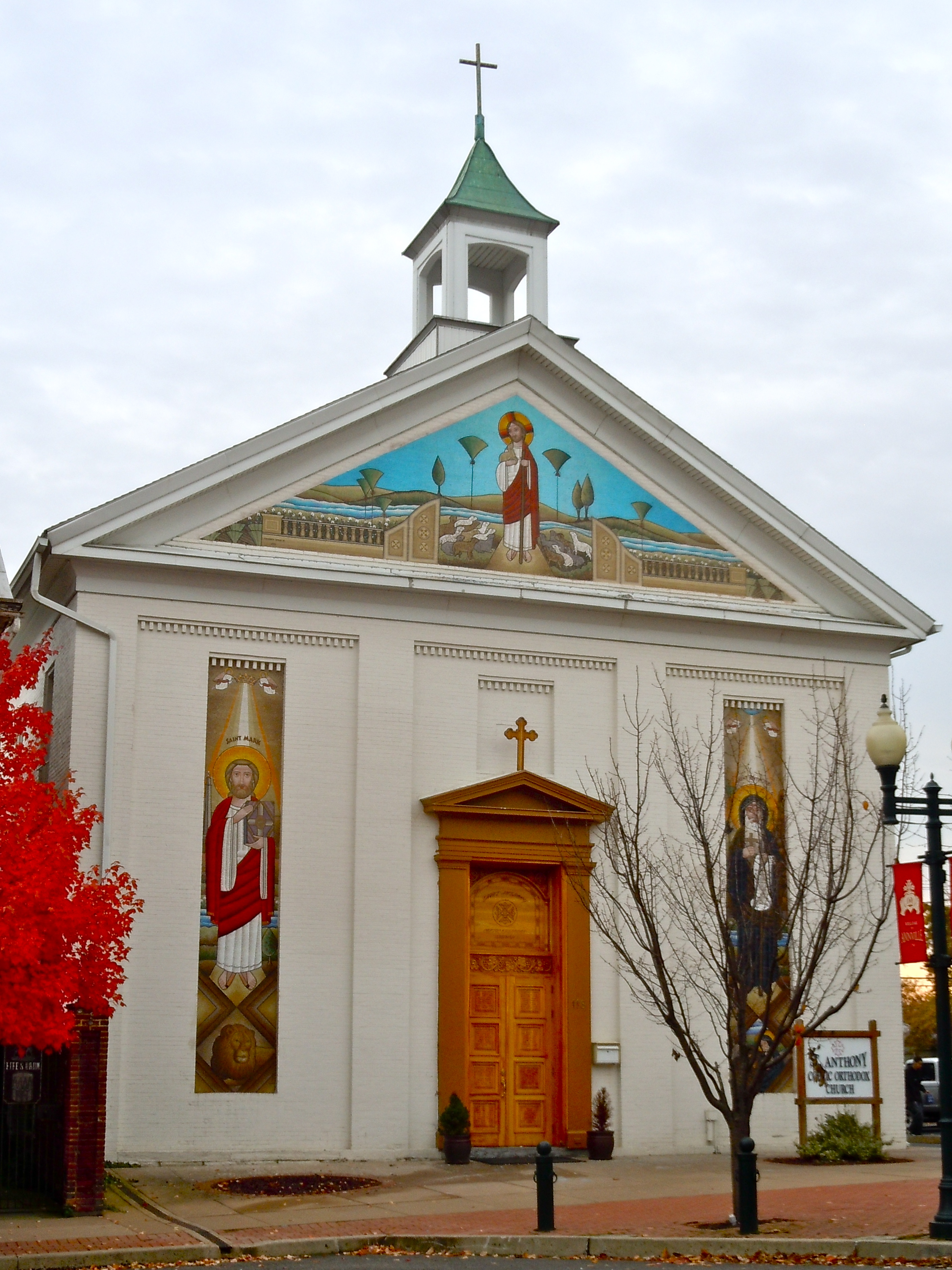
- St. Anthony's Coptic Church, Annville Historic District, November 2011

- Location within Pennsylvania Location within the United States
- Location: Roughly bounded by Quittapahilla Creek, Lebanon, Saylor and Marshall Sts., in Annville Township, Pennsylvania
- Coordinates: 40°19′42″N 76°30′58″W
- Area: 88.5 acres (35.8 ha)
- Built: 1763
- Architectural style: Queen Anne
- NRHP reference No.: 79002285
- Added to NRHP: April 30, 1979

The Annville National Historic District is a national historic district located in Annville, Lebanon County, Pennsylvania, United States. It is one of two historic districts in the community of Annville, and was added to the National Register of Historic Places in 1979.

== History ==
Originally an agricultural community with buildings constructed near the Quittapahilla Creek and various mills which had been built along those waters, the town of Annville was officially founded and developed between 1763 and 1764 with plans laid out by Andrew Miller, Abraham Raiguel and Adam Ulrich. Initially named Millerstown, the name was later changed to Annville, according to local lore, in honor of Miller's wife, Ann, or in gratitude for the support shown by Great Britain's Queen Anne to German Palatines, a significant number of whom had settled in this Lebanon County region. In addition to farming, the community also became known for its manufacture of felt and silk hats. As the community prospered, town leaders built new roads, entrepreneurs built new businesses, and local residents built new homes, expanding the town beyond its waterways and transforming the town's architectural style from primitive log cabins to Georgian stone houses and taverns to 19th century Victorian mansions and standard frame houses inhabited by working class families.

During the late 1970s and early 1980s, several members of Friends of Old Annville, an historic preservation group which was formed in 1978 to prevent the demolition of two historic buildings near the town center's bank, came together to prepare the nomination form to secure assistance from the National Register Review Committee in creating an official historic district in the city. The area proposed for recognition was the section of Annville's Main Street, which runs from the Quittapahilla Creek on the west end to Saylor Street on the east end. The west end of Queen Street was also included.

Following its review of that application, the National Register committee officially recognized the Annville Historic District, and placed it on the National Register of Historic Places in 1979, making Annville the first community in Lebanon County to have a nationally recognized historic district. According to the Friends of Old Annville, this district quickly "gained national recognition as a prime example of linear development from the very early west end to the more recent east end."

=== Creation of a second historic district ===
Annville's second historic district was subsequently established during the mid-1990s when Friends of Old Annville members Kathy Moe and Tanya Richter worked with Annville Township leaders to draft and pass a zoning overlay (historic district) to further enhance the community's protection of its historic buildings. Known currently as ordinance #587, this local legislation specifically defines the Annville Township Historic District as "running along Main Street only," and further clarifies the purposes of the historic district as:

- Protection "of that portion of Annville Township which reflects the cultural, economical, social, archaeological and architectural history of Annville Township, the State and the Nation";
- Awakening the interest of residents in their community's historic past;
- Promoting "the use and reuse of the historic buildings of Annville Township for the culture, education, pleasure and the general welfare of the people of Annville Township, the State and the Nation";
- Strengthening Annville Township's economy "by stabilizing and improving property values within the historic district through the continued use, preservation, and restoration of its resources";
- Encouraging new development "that will be harmonious with the existing historic and architecturally important buildings";
- Establishing clear procedures to address any proposed changes which would affect historic resources moving forward; and
- Encouraging "the preservation of historic settings and landscapes".

This ordinance also currently states that anyone proposing any modifications to any building in the historic district must obtain a building permit and that all such permits must be reviewed by, and must receive certification from, Annville's Historical Architectural Review Board (HARB) before any modifications may be made.

== Notable buildings ==
The Annville Historic District includes 275 buildings in the central business district and surrounding residential areas of Annville.

In 2007, the oldest remaining building in this historic district was the Mary Gass House. Built in 1753, it is a small, 1-1/2 story stone structure. Other notable buildings include 18th and early-19th century log dwellings, the Abraham Herr Manor House, St. Paul's Apostolic Church / St. Anthony's Coptic Church (1861), Kendig House (1830), Lewis Gilbert Inn (1800), Fleisher House and Livery (c. 1780), and the Queen Anne style Light House. Included in the district is the separately listed Biever House.

== Special events ==
On June 8, 2019, the Friends of Old Annville sponsored Historic Old Annville Days, the 31st annual commemoration of Annville's history. Held on West Main Street in the center of the historic district, the event featured performances by multiple music ensembles, including the Acoustic Blues Jam and Bluegrass Jam at Fulton Bank Plaza, solo performers on the Batdorf Stage, and concert bands at the district's bandstand.
