= Biever =

Biever is a surname. Notable people with the surname include:

- Nicolas Biever (1894–1965), Luxembourgish politician
- Tony Biever (1908–1990), Luxembourgish politician and jurist
- Vernon Biever (1923–2010), American photographer
- Violet Biever (1911–2010), American politician

== See also ==
- Biever House
- Biver (disambiguation)
