= Peter Zug =

American politician

Peter J. Zug
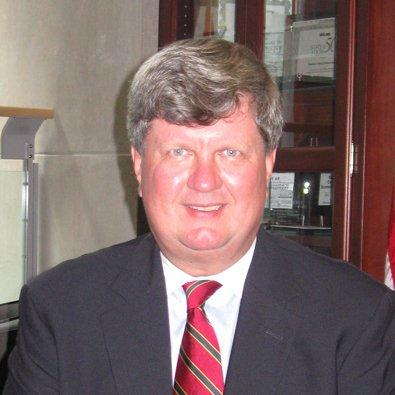

Member of the Pennsylvania House of Representatives from the 102nd district
- In office January 5, 1993 – November 30, 2006
- Preceded by: Ed Arnold
- Succeeded by: RoseMarie Swanger

Personal details
- Born: November 11, 1958 (age 67) Lebanon, Pennsylvania, U.S.
- Party: Republican
- Spouse: Susan M. Malasavage
- Children: Sarah, Ben
- Education: Kutztown University of Pennsylvania (BA)
- Occupation: Politician

Peter J. Zug (born November 11, 1958) is an American politician who served as a member of the Pennsylvania House of Representatives, representing the 102nd district from 1993 to 2006.

Zug graduated from Eastern Lebanon County High School in 1976, and he earned a Bachelor of Arts in Business Administration from Kutztown University of Pennsylvania in 1980. Zug worked as a staffer for the Pennsylvania Senate and served as a member of the Lebanon City Council and the Richland Borough Council.

He was first elected to represent the 102nd legislative district in the Pennsylvania House of Representatives in 1992. He was defeated for re-election in the 2006 Republican primary by RoseMarie Swanger.

Zug had legislation signed by all four governors with which he served. (2 Republicans and 2 Democrats). He recently was awarded the Pennsylvania Meritorious Service Medal in recognition of his support of the soldiers and airmen of the Pennsylvania National Guard and the state's 1.3 million veterans. This medal is awarded by the governor to civilians in recognition of meritorious service rendered to the Commonwealth while holding a position of great responsibility.

Zug was recognized by the Chesapeake Bay Foundation with their CBF Service Award for his work on environmental education programs. Zug has been inducted into the Eastern Lebanon County High School Hall of Fame and has received the District Award of Merit from the Boy Scouts of America. Zug also was inducted into the Honorable Order of Kentucky Colonels by PA Adjutant General Lynch and is a Silver Beaver Award Recipient from the Boy Scouts of America.

Zug is a recipient of the Guardian of Small Business Award, Citizens Against Higher Taxes Taxpayer Hero Award and PA Statesman of the Year Award. He served as a Legislative Fellow at Millersville University. Zug is also an Eagle Scout and God and Country Award Recipient.

Zug went on to serve as Deputy Secretary of Community Affairs and Development for the PA Department of Community and Economic Development. Prior he served as executive director for the Governor's Center for Local Government Services for Governor Corbett.

Zug's community activities include, Board of the PA Dutch Council, Boy Scouts of America, past chairman and board member of the Great Northern District Boy Scouts of America, past chairman of the Lebanon Valley Chamber of Commerce Leadership Lebanon Valley Program, Lebanon Lions Club and member of the Lambda Chi Alpha fraternity alumni association.
