= RoseMarie Swanger =

American politician

Member of the Pennsylvania House of Representatives from the 102nd district
- In office January 2, 2007 – November 12, 2014
- Preceded by: Peter J. Zug
- Succeeded by: Russ Diamond

Personal details
- Born: October 31, 1945 (age 80) Lebanon, Pennsylvania, U.S.
- Party: Republican
- Spouse: Leonard
- Children: 1
- Education: South Lebanon High School
- Website: www.repswanger.com

RoseMarie Swanger (born October 31, 1945) is an American politician and former member of the Pennsylvania House of Representatives from the 102nd District. A Republican, she was first elected in 2006 and served until 2014.

== Early life and education ==
Swanger was born on October 31, 1945, in Lebanon, Pennsylvania. She graduated from South Lebanon High School in 1963, and later attended the Thompson Institute and Lebanon Valley College.

== Political career ==
Swanger worked as a clerk in the mayor's office of Lebanon, Pennsylvania, from 1966 through 1972. She later worked as assistant city clerk from 1972 through 1974, and as city clerk for Lebanon from 1974 through 1984. She served as a county commissioner in Lebanon County from 1984 through 2004.

=== Pennsylvania House of Representatives ===
Swanger defeated incumbent Pennsylvania State Representative Peter Zug in the 2006 Republican primary following Zug's support for the controversial 2005 legislative pay raise. She later won the general election to represent the 102nd District. Swanger won re-election in 2008, 2010, and 2012. In 2014, Swanger announced she would not seek re-election.

==== Anti-Sharia bill ====
In 2011, Swanger introduced HB 2029, a bill which would prohibit courts from "consider[ing] a foreign legal code or system" that lacks "the same fundamental liberties" as the Pennsylvania Constitution and U.S. Constitution. In a letter to her Republican colleagues, Swanger claimed, "Increasingly, foreign laws and legal doctrines -- including and especially Shariah law -- are finding their way into U.S. court cases. Invoking Shariah law, especially in family law cases, is a means of imposing an agenda on the American people." Her bill, based upon a model written by anti-Sharia activist David Yerushalmi, was seen as "Islamophobic" and part of the wider anti-Sharia movement in the United States. In addition to Islamic leaders, Jewish and Catholic leaders questioned whether the bill would also compromise elements of their religious code and liberties. In response, the Pittsburgh City Council passed a unanimous resolution condemning HB 2029. Swanger's bill ultimately failed to make it past committee in the State House. Her reintroduction of the bill in 2014 was met with similar results.
