= Annville Mill =

Flour mill in Pennsylvania, United States

Coordinates: 40.3263°N 76.5247°W

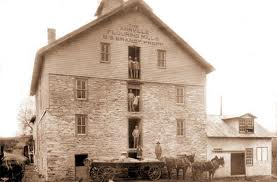
Historic Photo of Annville Mill

Annville Mill is thought to be one of the oldest continuously operating commercial flour mills in the United States, according to the local historical group, the Friends of Old Annville. A grist/flour mill has been standing since 1740 at this main street, now 545 W. Queen St, in Annville, Pennsylvania on the banks of Quittapahilla Creek, originally powered by water, but electrically powered since more than a century ago.

First used to grind flour as a grist mill, it also functioned as a saw mill and a fulling mill One of the first owners was Andrew Miller. The mill began a major process of modernization when purchased by the Brandt family in 1909, a time of great advances in milling technology in the United States. During the 20th century, roller mills were designed to extract flour from wheat in a process that was more economical than the age-old grinding of grain between two stones. Today, wheat grains are run through two rollers of different sizes that operate at varying speeds. They are then pneumatically lifted and repeatedly sent through the rollers until fully processed. The resulting flour is sifted and bagged under the name of Daisy Organic Flour. During that century of ownership, the Brandt family converted the mill power from water power to electricity and from grist mill to roller mill. Bakeries favored the flour for pretzels and pie crusts as well as the cookies. Bakeries have always favored the mill's original product – pastry flour – for pretzels and pie crusts as well as cookies. Only pastry flour was produced by the mill during the 18th, 19th centuries because local farmers were only able to grow the varieties of soft wheat that are best suited to the climate in this area of the northeast United States. In 2002 Annville Flouring Mill was purchased by McGeary Organics in order to support the commitment of local farmers to growing organic grains. With access to national transportation systems, McGeary has been able to introduce hard-wheat flours to the mill, adding Bread Flour and All-Purpose Flour to the product line of the Annville Mill. Annville Flouring Mill now produces premium Daisy Organic Flours from both regional and national growers of soft and hard wheat. Spelt flour was the last type of flour added to the product line of the Annville Flouring Mill. Spelt flour was first produced in the Annville Mill in 2002 in response to the rising popularity of ancient grains in the organic food world today. As of Dec 2025, the mill was in liquidation with an auction scheduled for Jan 16,2026. https://www.hessauctiongroup.com/auction/coming-soon-complete-liquidation-of-annville-flour-mill/

== Annville Mill Gallery ==
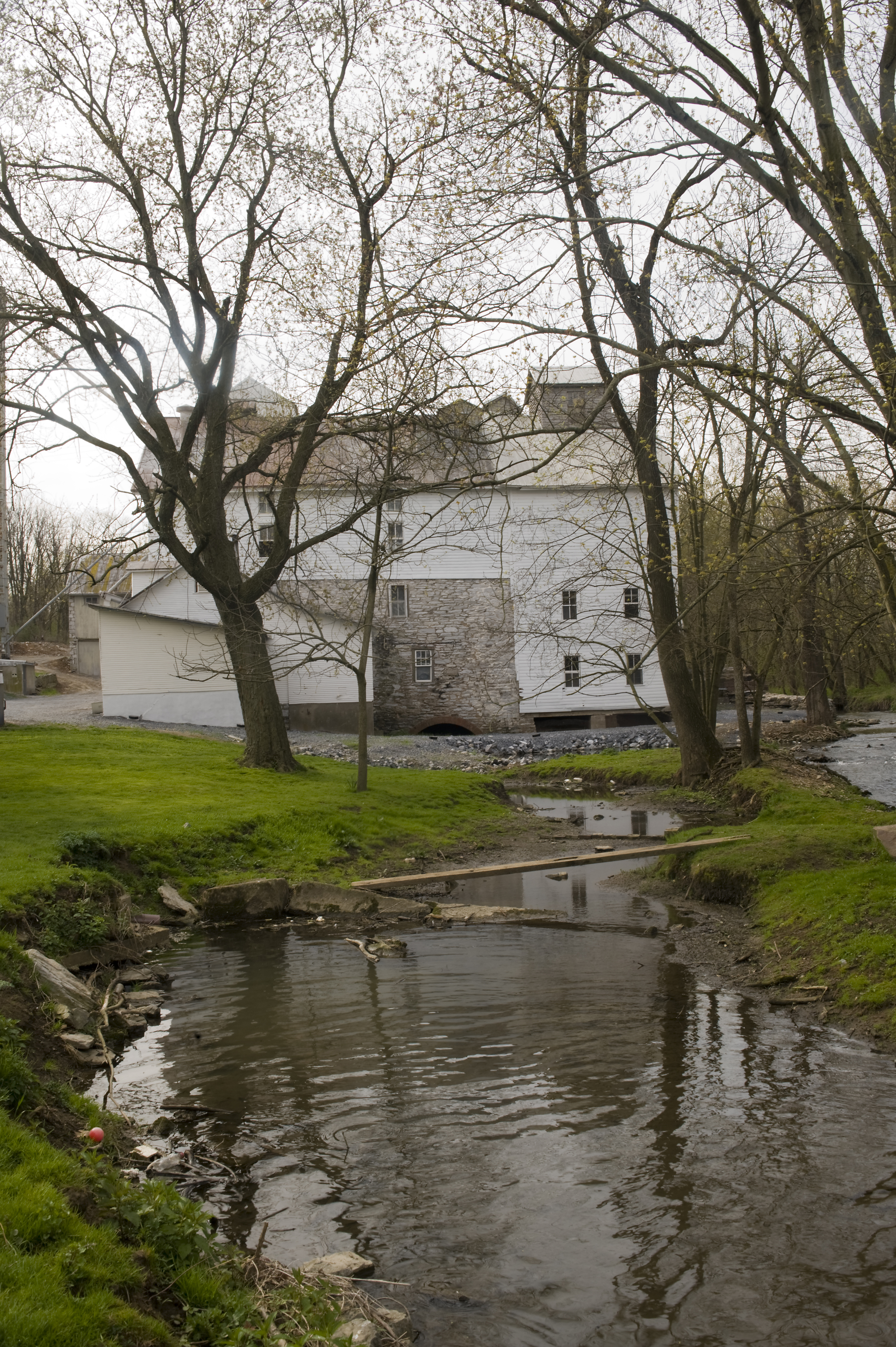
Annville Mill on Quittapahilla Creek.

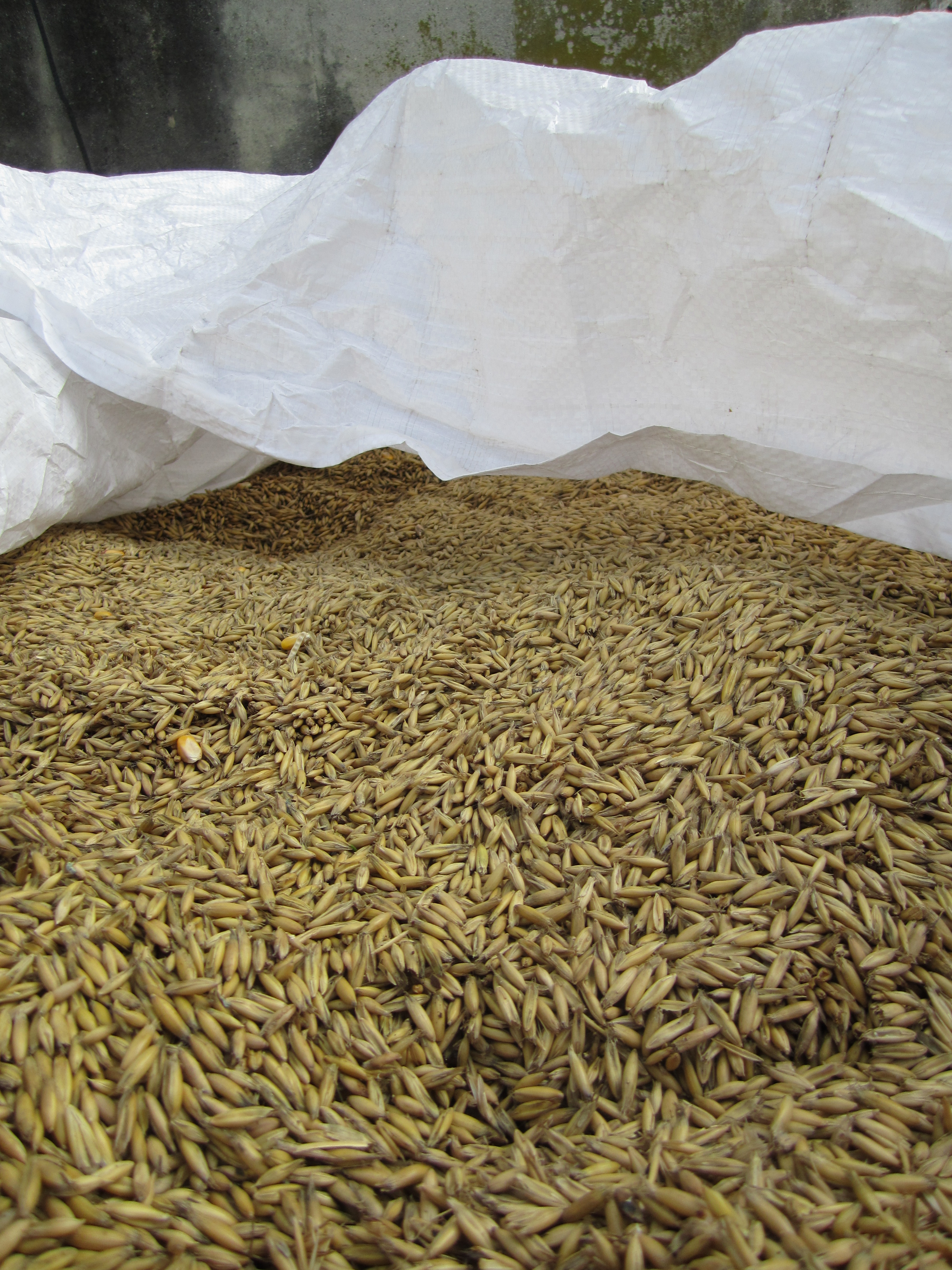
Organic Grain used to make Organic Flours.

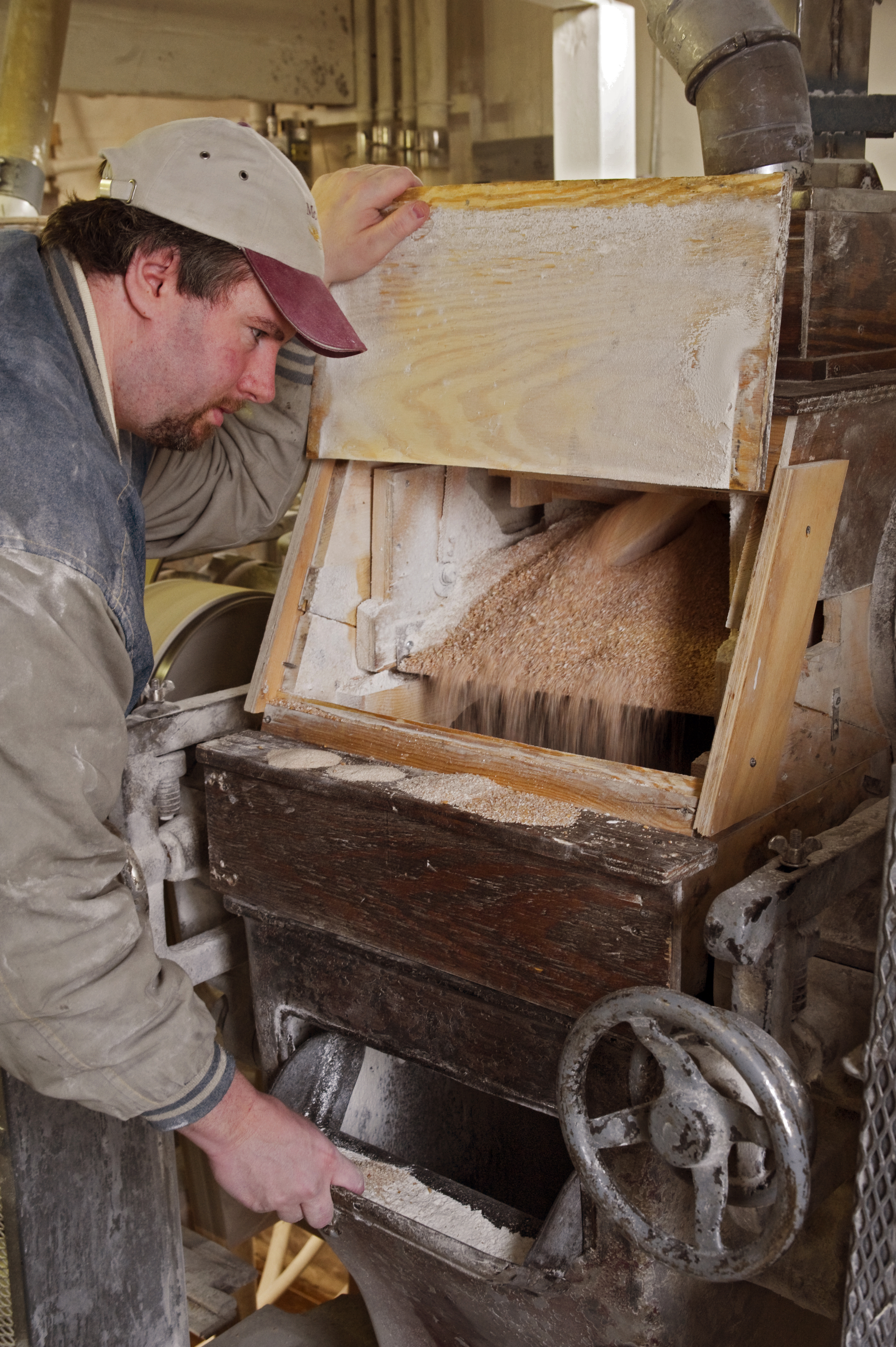
Roll Stand in Roller Mill with mill worker.

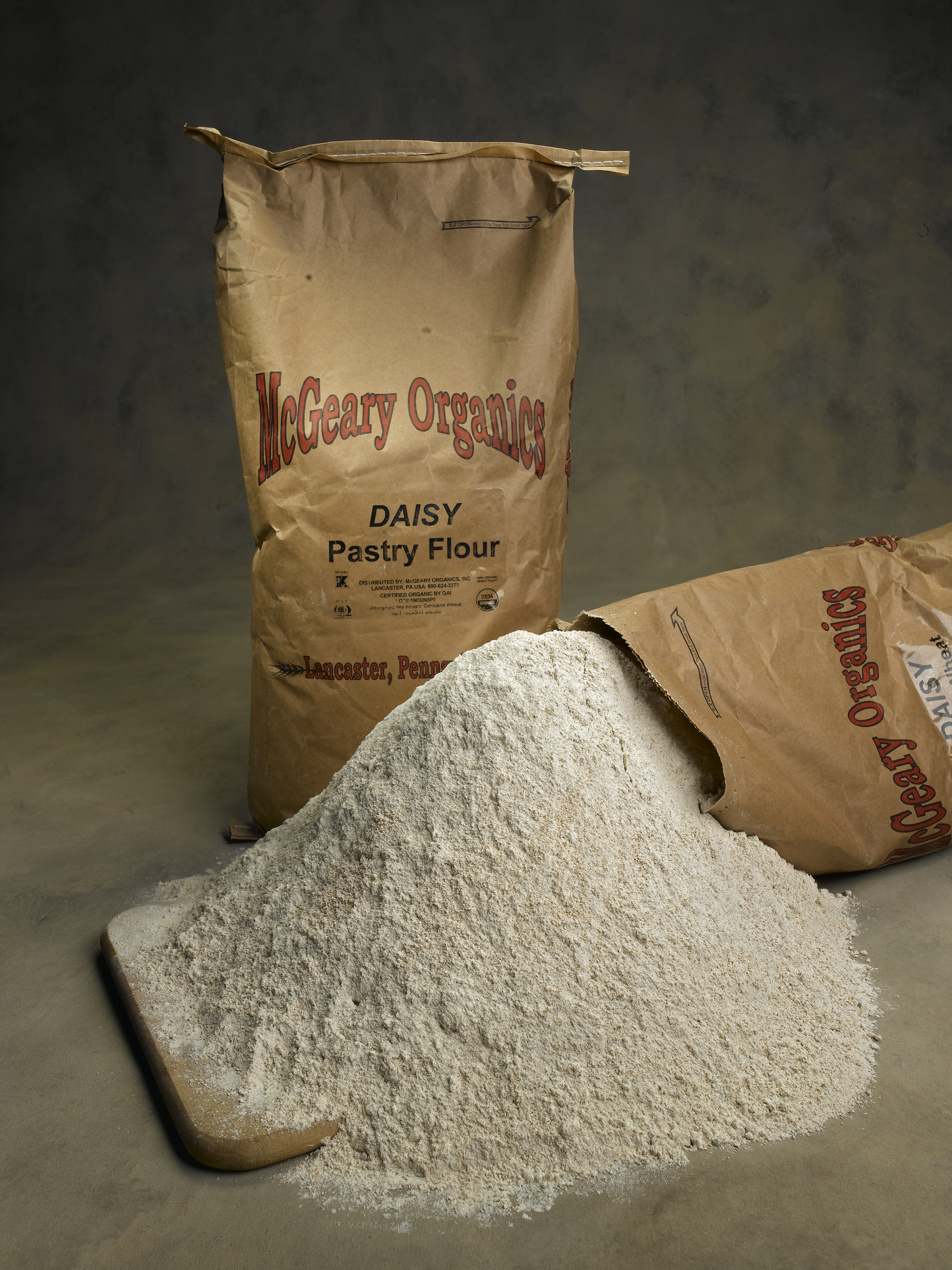
Bag of flour milled at the Annville Mill.
