= Ed Arnold =

American politician

Member of the Pennsylvania House of Representatives from the 102nd district
- In office 1991–1992
- Preceded by: Nicholas Moehlmann
- Succeeded by: Peter Zug

Personal details
- Born: March 4, 1943 (age 83) Lebanon, Pennsylvania, United States
- Party: Democratic
- Education: Lebanon Catholic High School, Lebanon Valley College

Ed Arnold (born March 4, 1943) is a former Democratic member of the Pennsylvania House of Representatives.
