= Dorothy Wilken =

American politician (1936–2026)

Dorothy H. Wilken (January 2, 1936 – June 22, 2026) was an American politician and clerk of courts. Wilken was a major proponent of the annexation of the community of University Park into the larger city of Boca Raton, Florida, during the early 1970s. She later served as the first female Mayor of Boca Raton and a Palm Beach County commissioner.

== Life and career ==
Wilken was born in Annville Township, Lebanon County, Pennsylvania on January 2, 1936. In 1965, she moved to Boca Raton, Florida, to take a job with Florida Atlantic University. She graduated from Emma Willard School in Troy New York nand George Washington University's Columbian College in Washington, DC and earned her MPA at Florida Atlantic University in Boca Raton FL.

A resident of the former town of University Park, Florida during the early 1970s, she was a strong proponent of the annexation of the smaller town into the city of Boca Raton. Residents of Boca Raton and University Park approved the merger in a referendum held on July 27, 1971.

Wilken was only the second woman to serve on the Boca Raton city council. Boca Raton city meeting minutes and the Boca Raton Historical Society indicate that another woman, Floy Mitchell, had previously served briefly on the council.

In March 1976, the Boca Raton city council elected Wilken as the city's mayor. She was the first woman to serve as Mayor of Boca Raton. She served as Mayor from March 1976 to February 1977, and again, briefly, during April 1977 following the resignation of Mayor Dick Houpana, who resigned just one month into his second term. The city established park impact fees and purchased the South Inlet Beach during Wilken's tenure. She also founded the Citizens for Reasonable Growth.

She was later elected as a Palm Beach County commissioner, first elected in 1982, and a clerk of courts in 1992, retiring in 2005.

Wilken died on June 22, 2026, at the age of 90.

== See also ==
- List of mayors of Boca Raton, Florida
