= JC Biver =

Swiss watchmaker

- Native name: jcbiver SA
- Company type: Private
- Industry: Watchmaking
- Founded: 2022
- Founder: Jean-Claude Biver (Founder); Pierre Biver (Founder, CEO)
- Headquarters: Givrins, Switzerland
- Products: Watches
- Website: www.jcbiver.com

JC Biver (officially jcbiver SA) is a Swiss luxury watch maker. Founded in 2022 by industry veteran Jean-Claude Biver and his youngest son Pierre Biver, the brand is headquartered in Givrins, Switzerland. Pierre Biver currently serves as its CEO.
