= Harvey Nitrauer =

American politician

Harvey L. Nitrauer

Member of the Pennsylvania House of Representatives from the 102nd district
- In office 1969–1970
- Preceded by: District created
- Succeeded by: Robert Rowe

Member of the Pennsylvania House of Representatives from the Lebanon County district
- In office 1967–1968

Personal details
- Born: March 6, 1906
- Died: June 24, 1988 (aged 82) Myerstown, Pennsylvania
- Party: Republican

Harvey L. Nitrauer (March 6, 1906 – June 24, 1988) was a Republican member of the Pennsylvania House of Representatives.
