= Jean-Claude Biver =

Luxembourg-born Swiss businessman, executive and cheesemaker

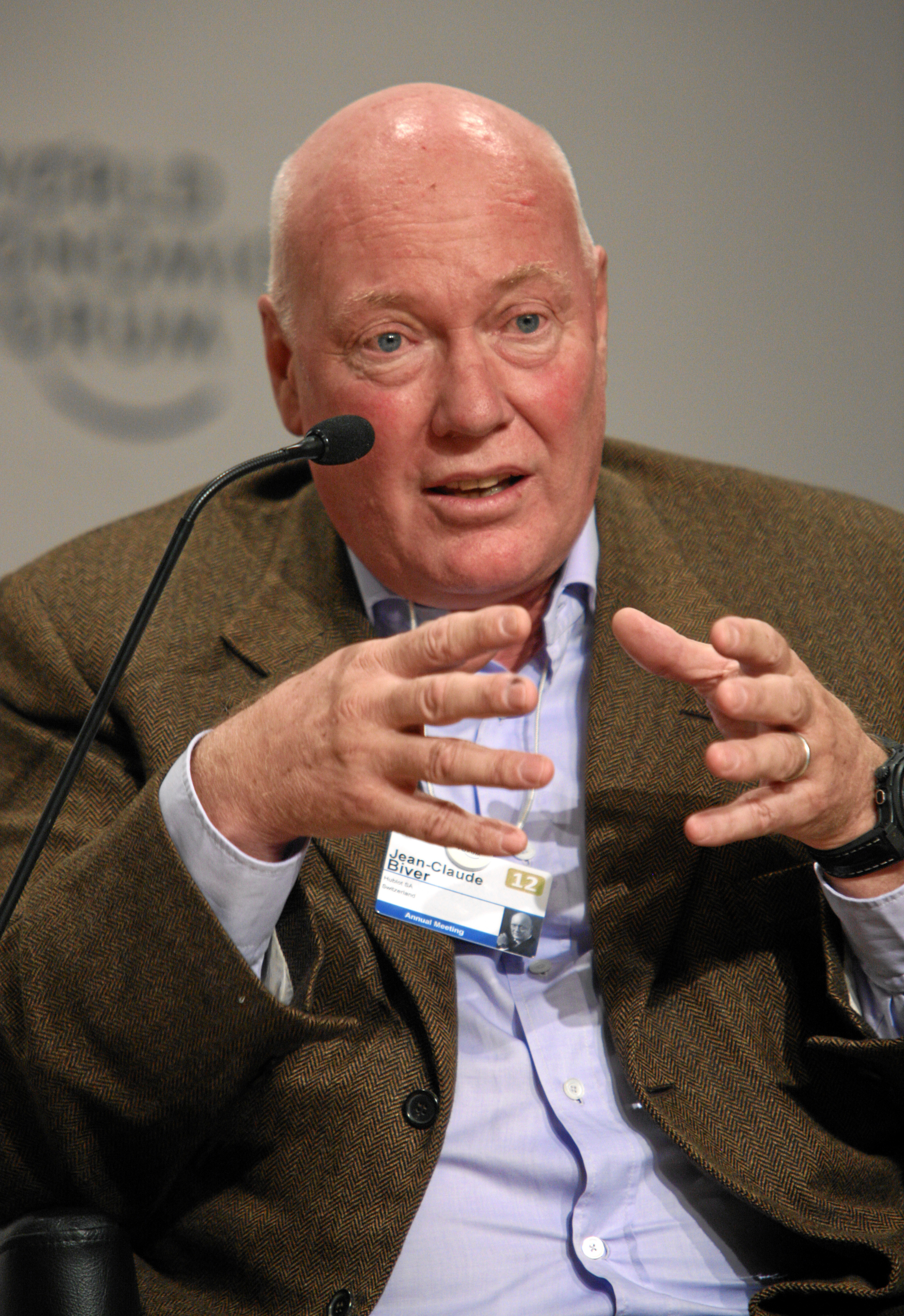
- Biver at the World Economic Forum annual meeting in 2012
- Born: Jean-Claude Biver; 20 September 1949 (age 76); Luxembourg City, Luxembourg
- Education: Collège du Morges; University of Lausanne
- Occupations: Watchmaker; cheesemaker; businessman
- Known for: Businesses exploits in the Swiss watchmaking industry
- Spouses: Yolande Gasser (divorced); Sandra Biver
- Children: 5

Jean-Claude Biver (French pronunciation: [dʒɑ̃ klod bivɛr]; born 20 September 1949) is a Luxembourg-born Swiss watchmaking executive. He previously was the chief executive officer (CEO) of TAG Heuer. From 2014 until 2018, he was the president of LVMH's watchmaking division until his retirement after 43 years in the industry.

Since 2014, he has been chief executive and a minority shareholder of Hublot, a Swiss luxury watchmaker. Biver previously helped rejuvenate the Blancpain and Omega brands, both owned by Swatch Group. Biver's leadership in the Swiss watch industry has been credited as "single handedly [sic] ... saving [the industry] from the quartz movement." In 1980, even prestigious Swiss watch brands had "a proportion of 70% more or less quartz movements in their collection;" since then, the Swiss watch industry has staged a "remarkable recovery", with 2008 exports valued at CHF17 billion.

Since 2022, Biver is the chairman of JC Biver, his own luxury watch manufacture based in Givrins, Switzerland, which he launched together with his youngest son Pierre Biver.

Biver is also known for his own cheese.

== Early life ==
Biver was born on 20 September 1949 in Luxembourg City, Luxembourg to Jacques Biver (b. 1924), who was the proprietor of a shoe store, and Denise Biver (née Zeien), originally from the Burgundy region in France. He spent his initial years at 2 Rue du Capucins in the old town of Luxembourg City.

At the age of ten, he moved with his family to Switzerland, attending school in Saint Prex. He later studied at Collège des Morges, and earned a degree in business at HEC Lausanne (also known as the Faculty of Business and Economics of the University of Lausanne).

== Watch industry ==
=== Early career ===
Upon graduation, he spent time in the Vallée de Joux, absorbing the culture of watchmaking, where he met Jacques Piguet, who was running the movement factory Frederic Piguet. Through Jacques' father, he met Georges Golay, chairman and CEO of Audemars Piguet, where he was offered a job as sales manager for Europe. In a year of working for AP, he was able to learn the "art of watchmaking," though he left after a year, thinking he could do better elsewhere. He left Audemars Piguet to become product manager at Omega, a major multinational brand, leaving Omega after a year to return to the manufacture d'horlogerie of the Vallée de Joux. Biver was given an honorary doctorate from Business School Lausanne in 2012, in recognition of his contribution to the success of the Swiss watchmaking industry.

=== Blancpain ===
Upon return to the Valley de Joux in 1981, Biver and Jacques Piguet purchased the rights to Blancpain, a watchmaker that had gone out of business in the 1970s. Blancpain had a long history but had been rendered obsolete by the development of quartz watches. Using this as a strength, Biver and Piguet rebuilt the brand on the concept that "Since 1735 there has never been a quartz Blancpain watch. And there never will be." Blancpain quickly became one of the most respected traditional watch brands, achieving a turnover of CHF50m. In 1992, the brand was sold to SMH Group (now known as Swatch Group) for CHF60m (USD43m), having been initially purchased for CHF22,000. Biver remained CEO of Blancpain until 2003.

=== Omega ===
Upon the sale of Blancpain, Biver joined the board of directors of Swatch Group, where he was charged with turning around Swatch's Omega brand. Biver's main influence was in the product and marketing fields, employing techniques such as product placement (notably in James Bond films) and celebrity sponsorships (including testimonials from Cindy Crawford, Michael Schumacher, and Pierce Brosnan). Biver left Omega in 2003, having presided over the company's "dazzling" recovery. Over Biver's ten years at Omega, its sales had almost tripled.

=== Hublot ===
Biver briefly exited the watchmaking world in 2004, before joining Hublot as CEO and board member. At Hublot, he has emphasized "the fusion of tradition and future." Hublot was bought by LVMH in 2008, following a fivefold increase in sales from 2004 to 2007. Even in the late-2000s recession, Hublot has been considered to be very successful, with sales down 15% up to November 2009, compared with 30% for the entire Swiss luxury watch business. Biver has retained the brand's exclusivity through methods such as restricting supply in the face of large demand, citing that "people want exclusivity, so you must always keep the customer hungry and frustrated."

=== TAG Heuer and LVMH ===
Biver became the CEO of TAG Heuer in December 2014. The company's thirty-year cooperation with the McLaren motorsport team came to an end in late 2015, after Biver had a falling out with McLaren owner Ron Dennis. TAG Heuer subsequently joined Red Bull Racing, becoming namesake to their Renault engines.

Similarly in 2014, Biver was named as the head of the watches and jewelry division of the LVMH conglomerate managing other brands including TAG Heuer, Zenith, and Hublot. In 2018, Biver announced his resignation as head of the watches and jewelry division of the LVMH for health reasons ending 43 years in the watch industry.

== Cheese ==
Every year, Biver produces approximately five tonnes of cheese at his farm in the Swiss Alps. Biver produces cheese for only a few weeks every summer during which the alpine meadows flower, rendering "a flowery taste to the milk and subsequently, to the cheese." Because of the cheese's exclusivity, Biver refuses payment, offering cheese only to his friends and family, and to particular restaurants of his choosing. Biver stated that by refusing payment, he can remain in absolute control of the cheese's distribution: "I will be the master of my cheese until the last piece."

== Personal life ==
Biver was initially married to Yolande Froidevaux (née Gasser; formerly Biver) with whom he had two children; Loic Biver and Delphine Mira (née Biver). He would later remarry to German-born Sandra Biver with whom he had Pierre Biver (born 2000).
