= Hublot =

Swiss luxury watchmaking company

Hublot SA
- Type: Subsidiary
- Industry: Watchmaking
- Founded: 1980; 46 years ago
- Founder: Carlo Crocco
- Headquarters: Nyon, Switzerland
- Key people: Ricardo Guadalupe (CEO)
- Products: Wristwatches
- Revenue: ▼CHF 670 million (2023)
- Number of employees: 800 (2024)
- Parent: LVMH
- Website: www.hublot.com

Hublot SA (English: /uːbloʊ/, French: [yblo]) is a Swiss luxury watchmaker founded in 1980 by Italian Carlo Crocco. The company operates as a wholly owned subsidiary of the French luxury conglomerate LVMH. Hublot has developed its brand through innovations such as the Unico chronograph, Meca-10, Tourbillons, and high-complication movements created for select products.

== History ==
Hublot is a Swiss luxury watch brand founded in 1980 by Carlo Crocco, a scion of the founding family of Italy's Binda Group. Moving to Switzerland he formed MDM Geneve and set about designing a watch that he named the Hublot after the French word for "porthole". The watch's groundbreaking design, which combined a precious-metal case with a natural rubber strap, set a new standard in the watch industry. Following its debut at the 1980 Basel Watch Fair, the watch quickly gained attention and achieved commercial success, generating more than $US2 million in sales during its first year.

=== The Jean-Claude Biver era ===
Crocco, preoccupied by his own design work and many activities for the Hand-in-Hand Foundation, a charity helping children worldwide, set out to look for someone to oversee Hublot. In late 2003, Jean-Claude Biver, then president of Swatch Group's Omega division, met Crocco, and in May 2004, Biver assumed duties as CEO, becoming a board member and minority shareholder in Hublot Watches.

Upon his arrival, Biver set about creating a new flagship collection that was unveiled in Basel in April 2005, with the Hublot "Big Bang" chronograph. It was an immediate success and orders increased threefold in one year. In November, the Big Bang chronograph was awarded internationally, receiving the 2005 Design Prize in the Geneva Watchmaking Grand Prix, the Sports Watch Prize at the Watch of the Year ceremony in Japan, and the Middle Eastern Prize for the Best Oversized Watch at the Editor's Choice Watch of the Year in Bahrain. Following the arrival of Biver in 2004, the brand's sales were 24 million Swiss francs and by the end of 2006, sales were close to 100 million Swiss francs.

=== Stores ===
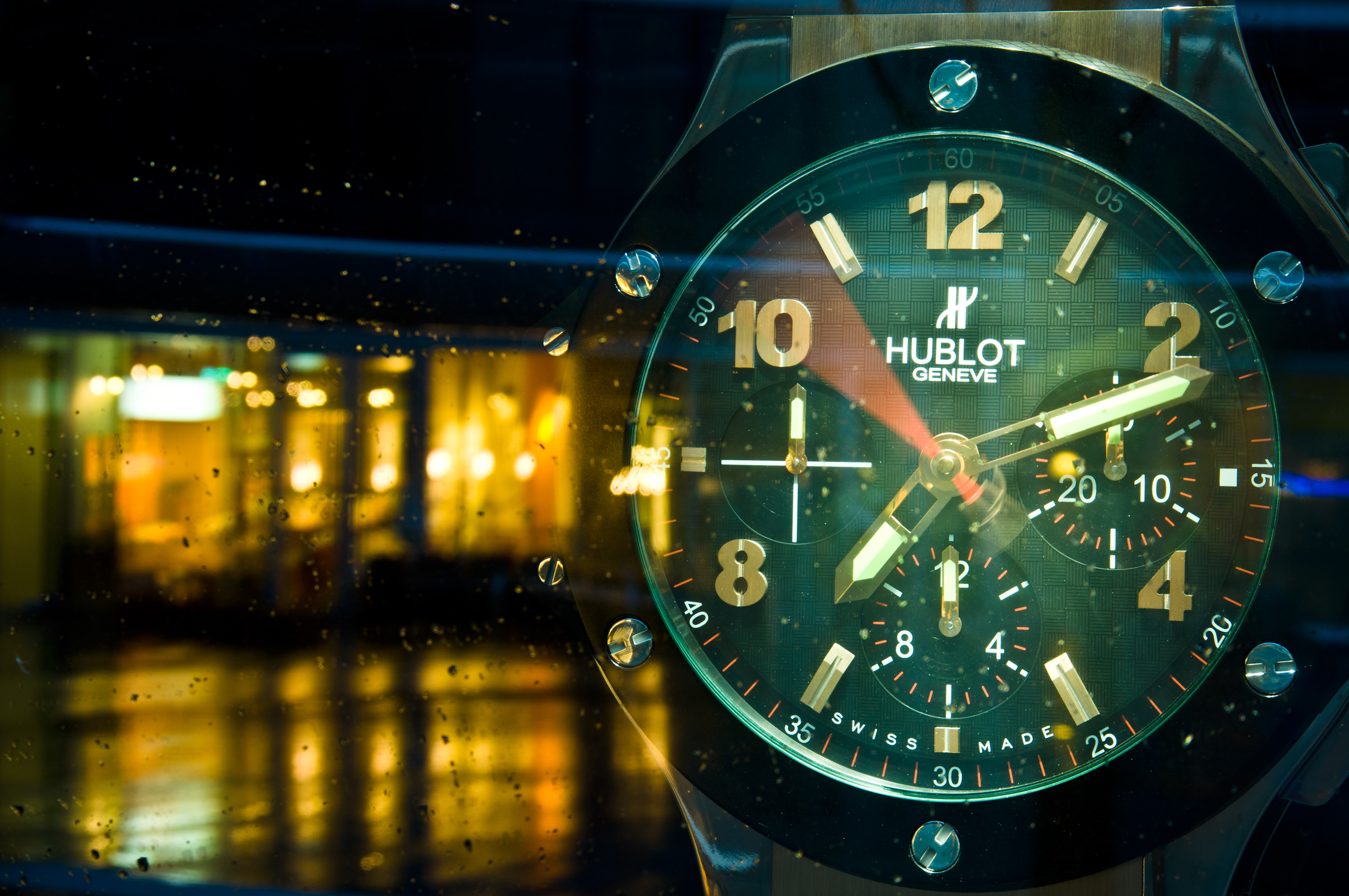
An enormous Hublot wristwatch at Hublot Boutique shop window in Warsaw

As of 2019, Hublot had 169 boutiques in several countries. In February 2007, Hublot opened its first mono-brand store in Paris, in the Rue Saint-Honoré. The second was opened in the summer of that year, in the Hôtel Byblos, Saint-Tropez. Today, Hublot has a store on Bond Street, London. United States locations include Bal Harbour, Beverly Hills, Boca Raton, Dallas, Houston, two in Las Vegas, New York, Palm Beach and Scottsdale.

=== Acquisition by LVMH ===
In April 2008, luxury goods group LVMH announced it had acquired Hublot from Crocco for an undisclosed fee, adding to its existing portfolio of watch brands including TAG Heuer.

=== WISeKey ===
At BaselWorld 2009, Hublot unveiled WISeKey, a new method of detecting counterfeit watches. Using a smart card, the system authenticates watches on Hublot's servers. The system went live in August 2009.

=== Hublot Manufacture ===
Hublot's first manufacture opened in 2009 in Nyon, near Geneva, Switzerland and rapidly developed notable manufacturing expertise and capabilities.

== Notable models ==
- The Big Bang Collection, featuring a variety of materials including ceramic, sapphire, and Magic Gold.
- The Classic Fusion, available in both three-hand and chronograph versions.
- Exceptional timepieces created in collaboration with world-renowned artists, including Samuel Ross, Takashi Murakami, and recently Jeff Koons.

== Sponsorships ==
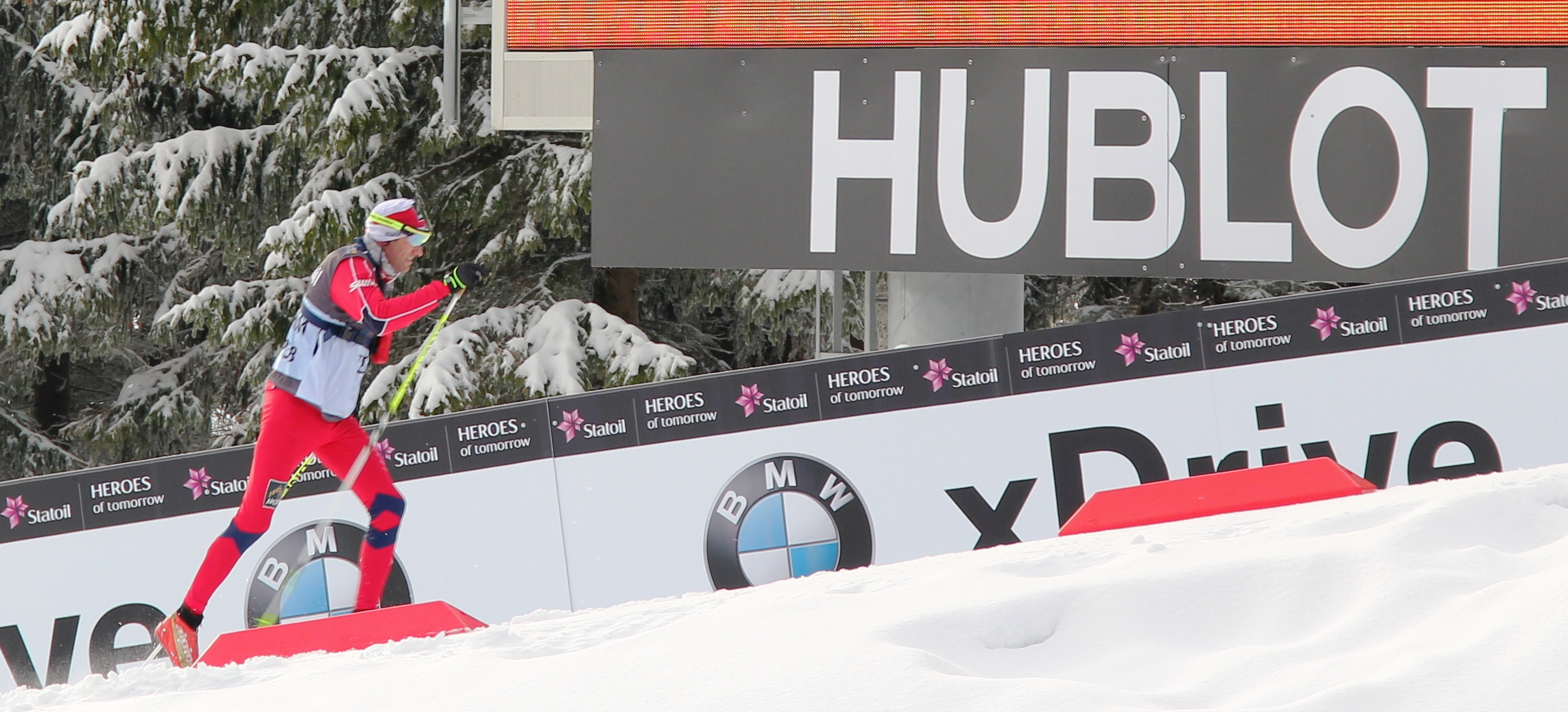
Hublot, timekeeper of the FIS Nordic World Ski Championships 2011 in Oslo

To increase the public profile of their brand Hublot have engaged in a number of sponsorship deals. In 2008, they agreed a sponsorship deal with the football club Manchester United, worth £4 million a year. Later, Hublot started endorsing some top football clubs like FC Bayern Munich, Juventus, Paris Saint-Germain, Ajax Amsterdam.

In 2019, Hublot became the first watch brand to work with ICC when the brand was announced as official time keeper for cricket's flagship event, 2019 ICC cricket world cup co-hosted by England and Wales.

In 2015, the company signed an agreement with San Lorenzo de Almagro of Argentina.

They provided special versions of their Big Bang watches to referees officiating at UEFA Euro 2008. In March 2010, Hublot was appointed the Official Watchmaker of Formula 1. Hublot have released a number of Formula One themed watches, including celebrating the return of the US Grand Prix to Austin, Texas, US in November 2012, with the Hublot F1 King Power Austin.

In April 2010, Hublot became the official time keeper of the 2010 and the 2014 FIFA World Cups. They have also been involved in a tie-up with the Financial Times, sponsoring the newspaper's iPad app.

Hublot and Ferrari announced during the 2011, Ferrari World Finals at Mugello a long-term strategic partnership which will officially start on 1 January 2012, making Hublot Ferrari's "Official Watch" and "Official Timekeeper". Throughout the partnership, the two brands introduced various collaborative timepieces, including the Big Bang Ferrari and the Techframe Ferrari Tourbillon Chronograph. The partnership lasted for approximately ten years.

The company also sponsors the National Basketball Association's Los Angeles Lakers and Miami Heat.

They were also the sponsors of the FIS Nordic World Ski Championships 2011 in Oslo.

Hublot continued its sponsorship and partnership activities in 2012 with becoming the Official Watch of the UEFA EURO 2012 tournament and Official Timekeeper of the tournament.

In April 2012, Hublot Partnered the Swiss Confederation at the World Expo 2012 in South Korea, a 3-month world event, where countries have the opportunity to promote themselves to the world. and displayed its new Divers Watch the Hublot Oceanographic 4000 King Gold White, which has been tested to a water resistance of 5,000 m and is certified water resistant to 4,000 m.

Hublot also partnered with the Archaeological Museum of Athens in presenting Hublot's "Tribute to the Antikythera Mechanism" movement. The Hublot movement officially joined the National Museum's collection on 5 April 2012, and will now be on display alongside the remains of the original mechanism.

In January 2013, Scuderia Ferrari had Hublot as its official sponsor for 2013, 2014 and 2015 F1 Season.

In November 2015, Hublot was the official timekeeper and a major sponsor of the inaugural WBSC Premier12 international baseball tournament held in Taiwan and Japan, promoting their partnership with the motto, "Hublot Loves Baseball."

In August 2015, Hublot was announced as the new official timekeeper of the UEFA Champions League, starting from the 2015–16 season.

In 2018, Hublot continued its role as the official time keeper at the Russia 2018 FIFA World Cup.

In February 2019, the company signed an agreement with Club Olimpia from Paraguay.

In September 2020, Hublot was announced as the new official timekeeper of the Premier League, starting from the 2020–21 season.

In 2022, Hublot served as the official time keeper of the Qatar 2022 FIFA World Cup, marking its fourth consecutive FIFA World Cup as the tournament’s Official Timekeeper.

In 2024, Hublot again became the Official Watch for the UEFA Euro 2024 tournament and being appointed as the Official Timekeeper for the event.

Since February 2025, Hublot has served as the official watch and official time keeper of The Snow League. Korean snowboarder Choi Ga-on, who recently won a gold medal at the Milan Winter Olympics snowboarding event, also participated in the league and was presented with a Hublot timepiece to commemorate the achievement.

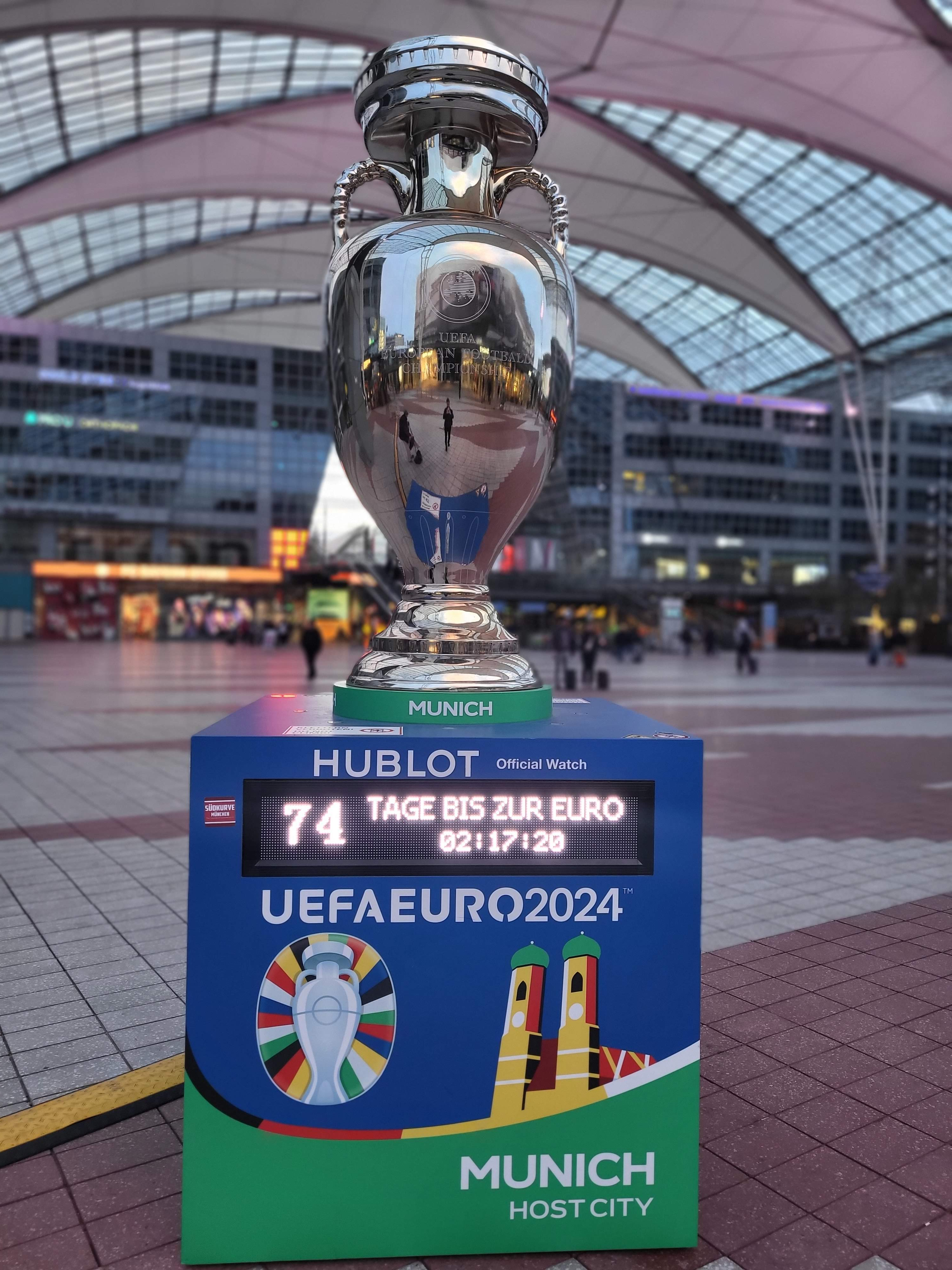
Hublot countdown clock for UEFA Euro 2024 in front of Munich Airport

== Ambassadors ==
Hublot communicates its values of Boldness, Innovation, and Fusion through collaborations with individuals who set new standards in their respective fields. The brand has appointed global leaders from sports, music, film, art, and fashion as ambassadors, building partnerships that go beyond sponsorship to embody and share the brand’s philosophy.

In the world of sports, figures such as Kylian Mbappé, Usain Bolt, and Novak Djokovic have represented Hublot.

In the fields of culture and the arts, Hublot has collaborated with designer Samuel Ross and artists Takashi Murakami and Jeff Koons, reinforcing the brand’s creative and contemporary image. In 2026, the brand partnered with Jeff Koons to unveil the Classic Fusion Balloon Dog and the MP-14 Origin, highlighting the fusion of contemporary art and watchmaking. Through its network of brand friends, Hublot has also built a global community spanning music, art, and fashion, extending the boundaries of what a luxury watch brand can represent.

In February 2026, Hublot appointed Jung Kook of BTS as a global brand ambassador, marking the beginning of a new chapter. With his strong influence across music, fashion, and lifestyle, the partnership connects traditional Swiss high-end watchmaking with contemporary popular culture, bringing Hublot’s spirit of innovation and fusion to a new generation.
