= Robert Rowe =

American politician

Robert C. Rowe

Member of the Pennsylvania House of Representatives from the 102nd district
- In office 1971–1974
- Preceded by: Harvey Nitrauer
- Succeeded by: Nicholas Moehlmann

Personal details
- Born: July 15, 1938 (age 88) Lebanon, Pennsylvania
- Party: Republican

Robert C. Rowe (born July 15, 1938) is a former attorney and former Republican member of the Pennsylvania House of Representatives. He was disbarred by the Pennsylvania Supreme Court on April 6, 1989, and was soon thereafter convicted of multiple counts of Forgery, Theft, Misappropriation of Entrusted Funds and Bad Checks.
