= Bobby Rowe (Australian footballer) =

Australian rules footballer

Personal information
- Full name: Raymond Berriman Rowe
- Born: 27 November 1883; Newstead, Victoria
- Died: 20 October 1958 (aged 74); Armadale, Victoria
- Original team: Fitzroy District

Playing career^{1}
Years	Club	Games (Goals)
1909–10	St Kilda	12 (1)
- ^{1} Playing statistics correct to the end of 1910.

Raymond Berriman Rowe (27 November 1883 – 20 October 1958) was an Australian rules footballer who played with St Kilda in the Victorian Football League (VFL).
