= Richland, Pennsylvania =

Borough in Pennsylvania, US

- Borough
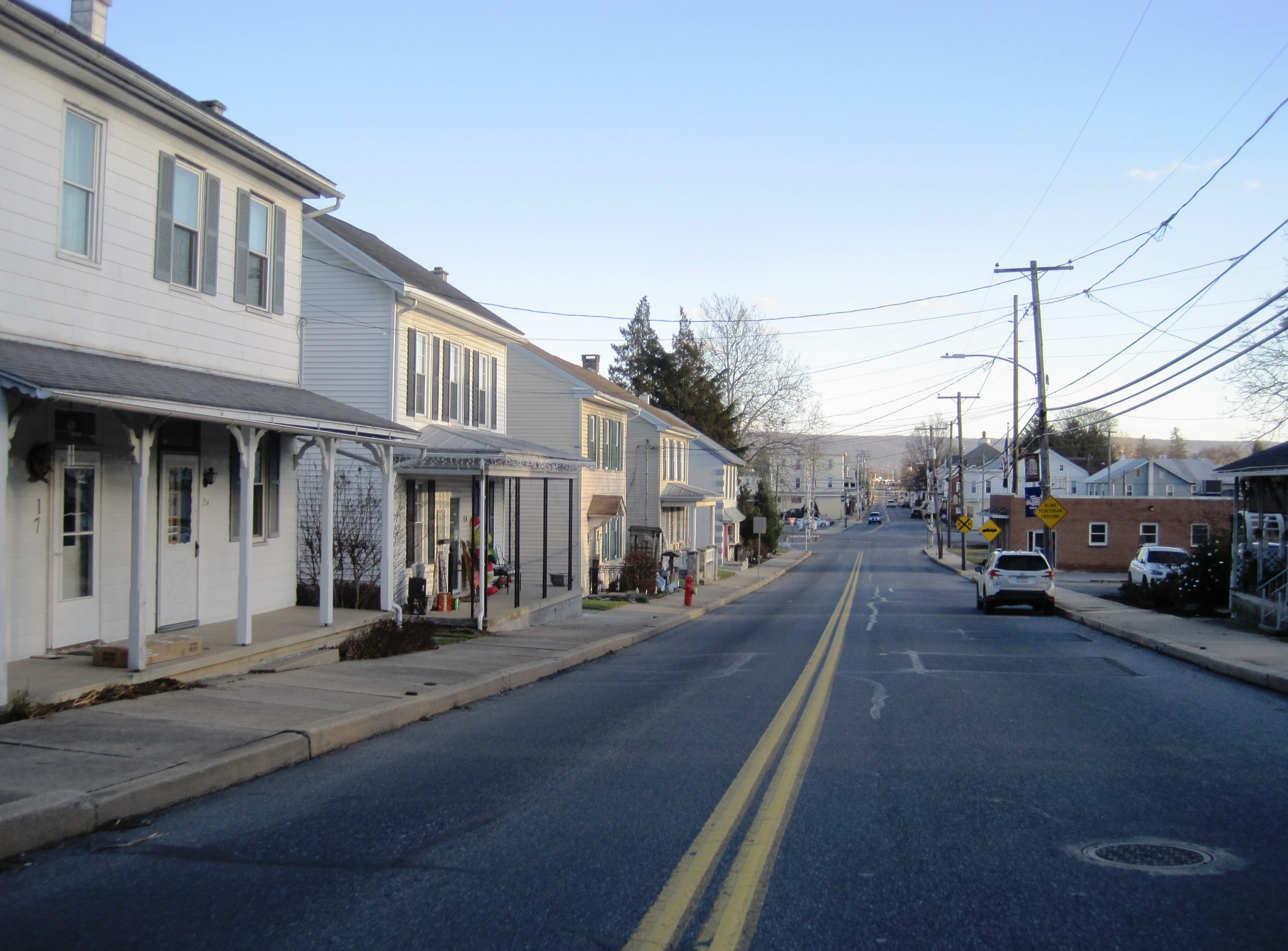
- View of West Main Street looking towards Race Street

- Location of Richland in Lebanon County, Pennsylvania.

- Location of Richland in Pennsylvania Richland (the United States)
- Coordinates: 40°21′26″N 76°15′26″W
- Country: United States
- State: Pennsylvania
- County: Lebanon
- Incorporated: 1906

Government
  - Type: Borough Council

Area
  - Total: 1.39 sq mi (3.59 km^{2})
  - Land: 1.39 sq mi (3.59 km^{2})
  - Water: 0 sq mi (0.00 km^{2})

Population (2020)
  - Total: 1,496
  - Density: 1,079.1/sq mi (416.66/km^{2})
- Time zone: UTC-5 (Eastern (EST))
  - Summer (DST): UTC-4 (EDT)
- ZIP code: 17087
- Area code: 717[223]
- FIPS code: 42-64560
- Website: https://richlandborough.org/

Richland is a borough in Lebanon County, Pennsylvania. It is part of the Lebanon County, Pennsylvania metropolitan statistical area. The population was 1,490 at the 2020 census.

Richland has an active railroad crossing that intersects the town square. The two streets that comprise the square, Main Street and Race Street, are the only streets linking the northern and southern portions of the borough. As a result, the crossing can divide the entire town. This quirk has earned Richland mentions in Ripley's Believe It or Not! books and on the televised game show, Jeopardy!.

== Geography ==
Richland is located at 40°21′26″N 76°15′26″W (40.357122, -76.257187). According to the U.S. Census Bureau, the borough has a total area of 1.6 square miles (4.1 km^{2}), all land.

== Demographics ==
Historical population
Census	Pop.	Note	%±
1880	297		—
1910	722		—
1920	841		16.5%
1930	952		13.2%
1940	934		−1.9%
1950	1,090		16.7%
1960	1,276		17.1%
1970	1,444		13.2%
1980	1,470		1.8%
1990	1,457		−0.9%
2000	1,508		3.5%
2010	1,519		0.7%
2020	1,496		−1.5%
2021 (est.)	1,492	▼	−0.3%

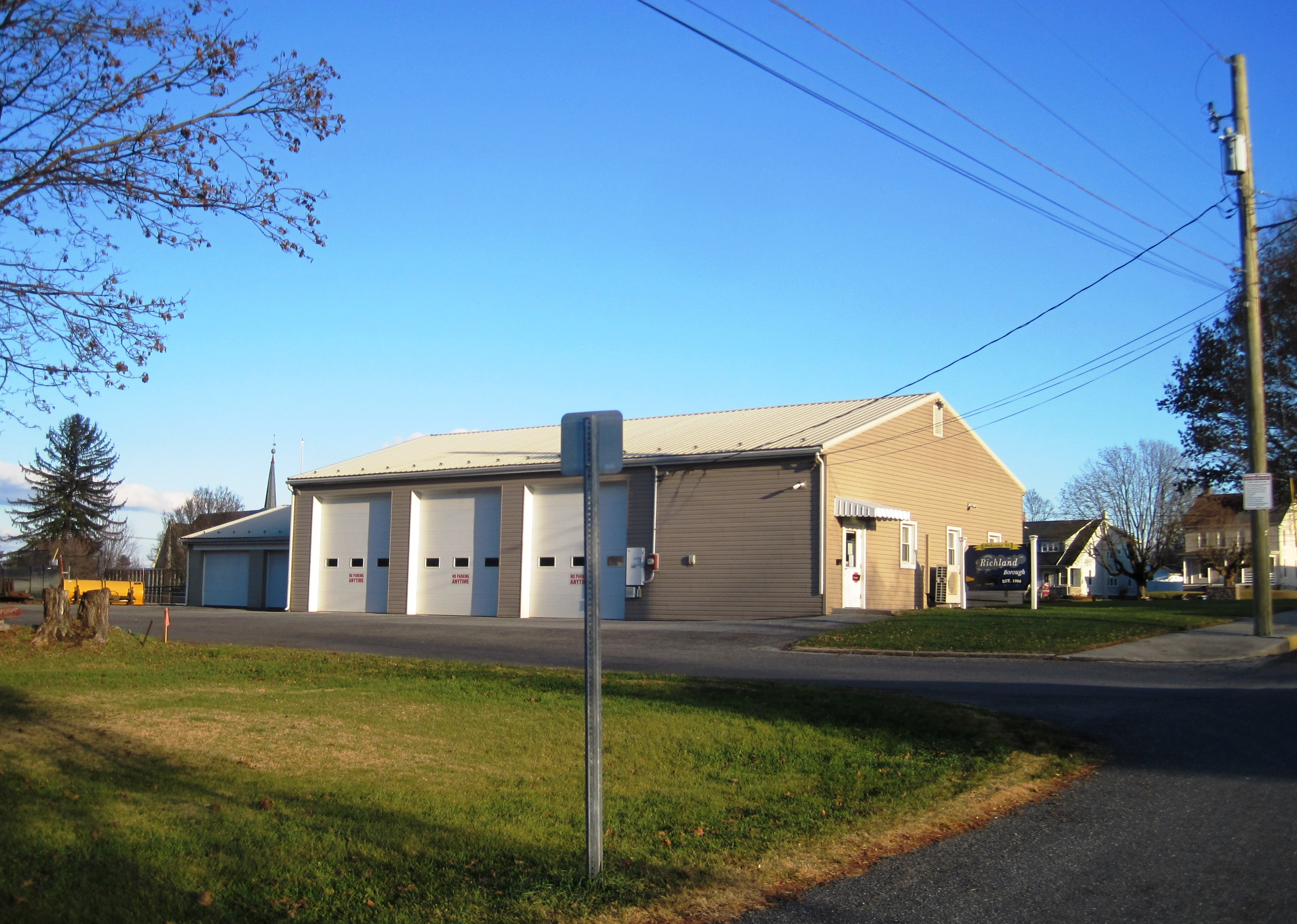
Richland Municipal Building

As of the 2000 census, there were 1,508 people, 582 households, and 444 families residing in the borough. The population density was 965.7 inhabitants per square mile (372.9/km^{2}). There were 602 housing units at an average density of 385.5 per square mile (148.8/km^{2}). The racial makeup of the borough was 98.21% White, 0.33% African American, 0.33% Asian, 0.33% from other races, and 0.80% from two or more races. Hispanic or Latino of any race were 0.60% of the population.

There were 582 households, out of which 32.8% had children under the age of 18 living with them, 66.0% were married couples living together, 6.0% had a female householder with no husband present, and 23.7% were non-families. 19.8% of all households were made up of individuals, and 10.5% had someone living alone who was 65 years of age or older. The average household size was 2.59 and the average family size was 2.96.

In the borough, the population was spread out, with 25.1% under the age of 18, 6.6% from 18 to 24, 29.4% from 25 to 44, 22.5% from 45 to 64, and 16.4% who were 65 years of age or older. The median age was 38 years. For every 100 females there were 97.4 males. For every 100 females age 18 and over, there were 93.5 males.

The median income for a household in the borough was $45,729, and the median income for a family was $52,063. Males had a median income of $35,208 versus $22,723 for females. The per capita income for the borough was $19,365. About 2.3% of families and 3.2% of the population were below the poverty line, including 2.7% of those under age 18 and 6.0% of those age 65 or over.

== Notable people ==
- Nicholas Moehlmann, former Pennsylvania State Representative
- Peter Zug, former Pennsylvania State Representative
