= Nicholas Moehlmann =

American politician

Nicholas B. Moehlmann

Member of the Pennsylvania House of Representatives from the 102nd district
- In office 1975–1990
- Preceded by: Robert Rowe
- Succeeded by: Ed Arnold

Personal details
- Born: July 26, 1938 (age 87) Reading, Pennsylvania
- Party: Republican
- Occupation: Attorney (retired); commercial hot air balloon pilot; FAA licensed hot air balloon repairman
- Website: www.svballoonco.com

Nicholas B. Moehlmann (born July 26, 1938) is a former Republican member of the Pennsylvania House of Representatives.

== Biography ==
Moehlmann graduated from Yale University in 1960 with a bachelor's degree in Russian Studies. A veteran of the U.S. Army Intelligence Corps (1961-1964), he is also a 1970 graduate of the Dickinson School of Law.

He practiced law in Lebanon, Pennsylvania for five years before his election to the Pennsylvania House of Representatives in 1974, where he served eight terms. He was defeated for reelection for the 1990 term by Democrat Ed Arnold.

Moehlmann was later appointed by Governor Tom Ridge to be executive director of the State Public School Building Authority and the state Higher Educational Facilities Authority, where he served for eight years.

A former national director of the Balloon Federation of America safety seminars program, he is also a commercial hot air balloon pilot and FAA licensed balloon repairman.
