= Givrins =

- Municipality
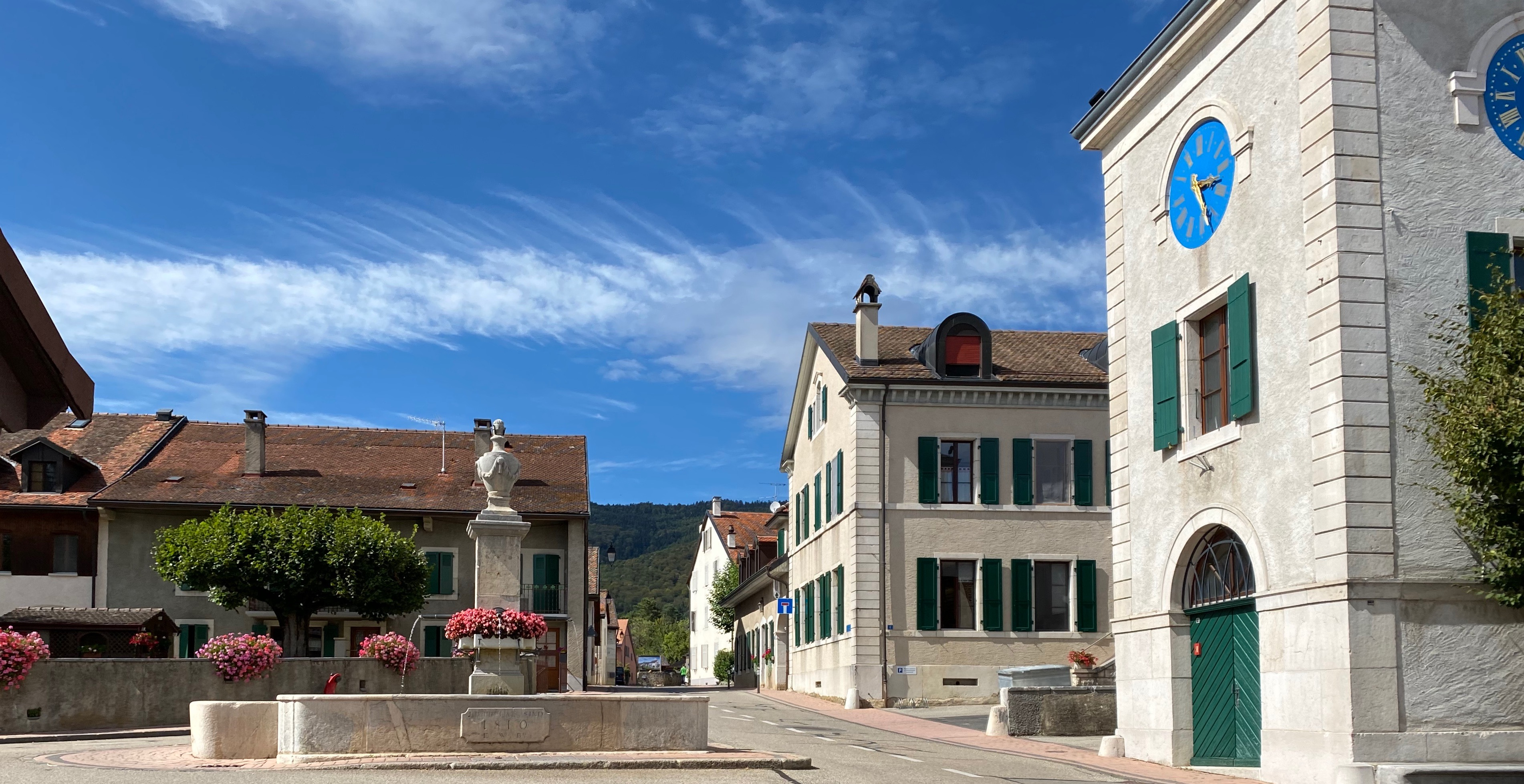

- Flag Coat of arms
- Location of Givrins
- Location within Switzerland Location within Canton of Vaud
- Coordinates: 46°26′N 6°12′E
- Country: Switzerland
- Canton: Vaud
- District: Nyon

Government
  - Mayor: Syndic

Area
  - Total: 3.97 km^{2} (1.53 sq mi)
- Elevation: 546 m (1,791 ft)

Population (2003)
  - Total: 840
  - Density: 210/km^{2} (550/sq mi)
- Time zone: UTC+01:00 (CET)
  - Summer (DST): UTC+02:00 (CEST)
- Postal code: 1271
- SFOS number: 5720
- ISO 3166 code: CH-VD
- Surrounded by: Arzier, Duillier, Genolier, Saint-Cergue, Trélex
- Website: www.givrins.ch

Givrins (French pronunciation: [ʒivʁɛ̃]) is a municipality in the district of Nyon in the canton of Vaud in Switzerland.

== History ==
Givrins is first mentioned about 1087 as Givriacus. In 1145 it was mentioned as Gevrins and in 1155-85 as Givriacum.

== Geography ==
Givrins has an area, as of 2009, of 4 square kilometers (1.5 mi^{2}). Of this area, 1.68 km^{2} (0.65 mi^{2}) or 42.3% is used for agricultural purposes, while 1.72 km^{2} (0.66 mi^{2}) or 43.3% is forested. Of the rest of the land, 0.54 km^{2} (0.21 mi^{2}) or 13.6% is settled (buildings or roads), 0.01 km^{2} (2.5 acres) or 0.3% is either rivers or lakes.

Of the built up area, housing and buildings made up 9.6% and transportation infrastructure made up 3.0%. Out of the forested land, 41.3% of the total land area is heavily forested and 2.0% is covered with orchards or small clusters of trees. Of the agricultural land, 33.8% is used for growing crops and 5.8% is pastures, while 2.8% is used for orchards or vine crops. All the water in the municipality is in lakes.

The municipality was part of the Nyon District until it was dissolved on 31 August 2006, and Givrins became part of the new district of Nyon.

The municipality is located on a small knoll at the foot of the Jura Mountains.

== Coat of arms ==
The blazon of the municipal coat of arms is Argent, on a Coupeaux Vert a Pine-tree of the same.

== Demographics ==
Givrins has a population (as of December 2020) of 1,031. As of 2008, 24.6% of the population are resident foreign nationals. Over the last 10 years (1999–2009 ) the population has changed at a rate of 16.9%. It has changed at a rate of 13.8% due to migration and at a rate of 3% due to births and deaths.

Most of the population (as of 2000) speaks French (627 or 76.2%), with English being second most common (83 or 10.1%) and German being third (82 or 10.0%). There are 7 people who speak Italian.

The age distribution, as of 2009, in Givrins is; 113 children or 12.4% of the population are between 0 and 9 years old and 129 teenagers or 14.2% are between 10 and 19. Of the adult population, 84 people or 9.3% of the population are between 20 and 29 years old. 104 people or 11.5% are between 30 and 39, 159 people or 17.5% are between 40 and 49, and 115 people or 12.7% are between 50 and 59. The senior population distribution is 119 people or 13.1% of the population are between 60 and 69 years old, 47 people or 5.2% are between 70 and 79, there are 31 people or 3.4% who are between 80 and 89, and there are 7 people or 0.8% who are 90 and older.

As of 2000, there were 315 people who were single and never married in the municipality. There were 441 married individuals, 35 widows or widowers and 32 individuals who are divorced.

As of 2000, there were 304 private households in the municipality, and an average of 2.7 persons per household. There were 60 households that consist of only one person and 26 households with five or more people. Out of a total of 311 households that answered this question, 19.3% were households made up of just one person and there were 2 adults who lived with their parents. Of the rest of the households, there are 93 married couples without children, 129 married couples with children There were 16 single parents with a child or children. There were 4 households that were made up of unrelated people and 7 households that were made up of some sort of institution or another collective housing.

In 2000 there were 180 single family homes (or 73.5% of the total) out of a total of 245 inhabited buildings. There were 30 multi-family buildings (12.2%), along with 26 multi-purpose buildings that were mostly used for housing (10.6%) and 9 other use buildings (commercial or industrial) that also had some housing (3.7%).

In 2000, a total of 289 apartments (88.7% of the total) were permanently occupied, while 25 apartments (7.7%) were seasonally occupied and 12 apartments (3.7%) were empty. As of 2009, the construction rate of new housing units was 4.3 new units per 1000 residents. The vacancy rate for the municipality, in 2010, was 1.09%.

The historical population is given in the following chart:

== Sights ==
The entire village of Givrins is designated as part of the Inventory of Swiss Heritage Sites.

== Politics ==
In the 2007 federal election the most popular party was the SVP which received 23.62% of the vote. The next three most popular parties were the FDP (21.14%), the SP (13.99%) and the Green Party (11.78%). In the federal election, a total of 293 votes were cast, and the voter turnout was 56.9%.

== Economy ==
As of 2010, Givrins had an unemployment rate of 1.9%. As of 2008, there were 33 people employed in the primary economic sector and about 11 businesses involved in this sector. 11 people were employed in the secondary sector and there were 6 businesses in this sector. 82 people were employed in the tertiary sector, with 31 businesses in this sector. There were 394 residents of the municipality who were employed in some capacity, of which females made up 41.1% of the workforce.

In 2008 the total number of full-time equivalent jobs was 98. The number of jobs in the primary sector was 22, all of which were in agriculture. The number of jobs in the secondary sector was 8 of which 3 or (37.5%) were in manufacturing and 4 (50.0%) were in construction. The number of jobs in the tertiary sector was 68. In the tertiary sector; 8 or 11.8% were in wholesale or retail sales or the repair of motor vehicles, 5 or 7.4% were in a hotel or restaurant, 2 or 2.9% were in the information industry, 3 or 4.4% were the insurance or financial industry, 15 or 22.1% were technical professionals or scientists, 7 or 10.3% were in education and 2 or 2.9% were in health care.

In 2000, there were 72 workers who commuted into the municipality and 308 workers who commuted away. The municipality is a net exporter of workers, with about 4.3 workers leaving the municipality for every one entering. About 15.3% of the workforce coming into Givrins are coming from outside Switzerland. Of the working population, 17.8% used public transportation to get to work, and 62.9% used a private car.

== Religion ==
From the 2000 census, 197 or 23.9% were Roman Catholic, while 402 or 48.8% belonged to the Swiss Reformed Church. Of the rest of the population, there were 2 members of an Orthodox church (or about 0.24% of the population), and there were 33 individuals (or about 4.01% of the population) who belonged to another Christian church. There were 4 individuals (or about 0.49% of the population) who were Jewish, and there was 1 individual who was Islamic. There was 1 person who was Buddhist. 166 (or about 20.17% of the population) belonged to no church, are agnostic or atheist, and 25 individuals (or about 3.04% of the population) did not answer the question.

== Education ==
In Givrins about 294 or (35.7%) of the population have completed non-mandatory upper secondary education, and 210 or (25.5%) have completed additional higher education (either university or a Fachhochschule). Of the 210 who completed tertiary schooling, 41.9% were Swiss men, 21.4% were Swiss women, 21.9% were non-Swiss men and 14.8% were non-Swiss women.

In the 2009/2010 school year there were a total of 98 students in the Givrins school district. In the Vaud cantonal school system, two years of non-obligatory pre-school are provided by the political districts. During the school year, the political district provided pre-school care for a total of 1,249 children of which 563 children (45.1%) received subsidized pre-school care. The canton's primary school program requires students to attend for four years. There were 54 students in the municipal primary school program. The obligatory lower secondary school program lasts for six years and there were 43 students in those schools. There was also 1 student who was home schooled or attended another non-traditional school.

As of 2000, there were 57 students in Givrins who came from another municipality, while 101 residents attended schools outside the municipality.

== Transport ==
It is served by the NStCM Train.
