= Biever House =

Historic house in Pennsylvania, United States

- U.S. National Register of Historic Places
- U.S. Historic district – Contributing property
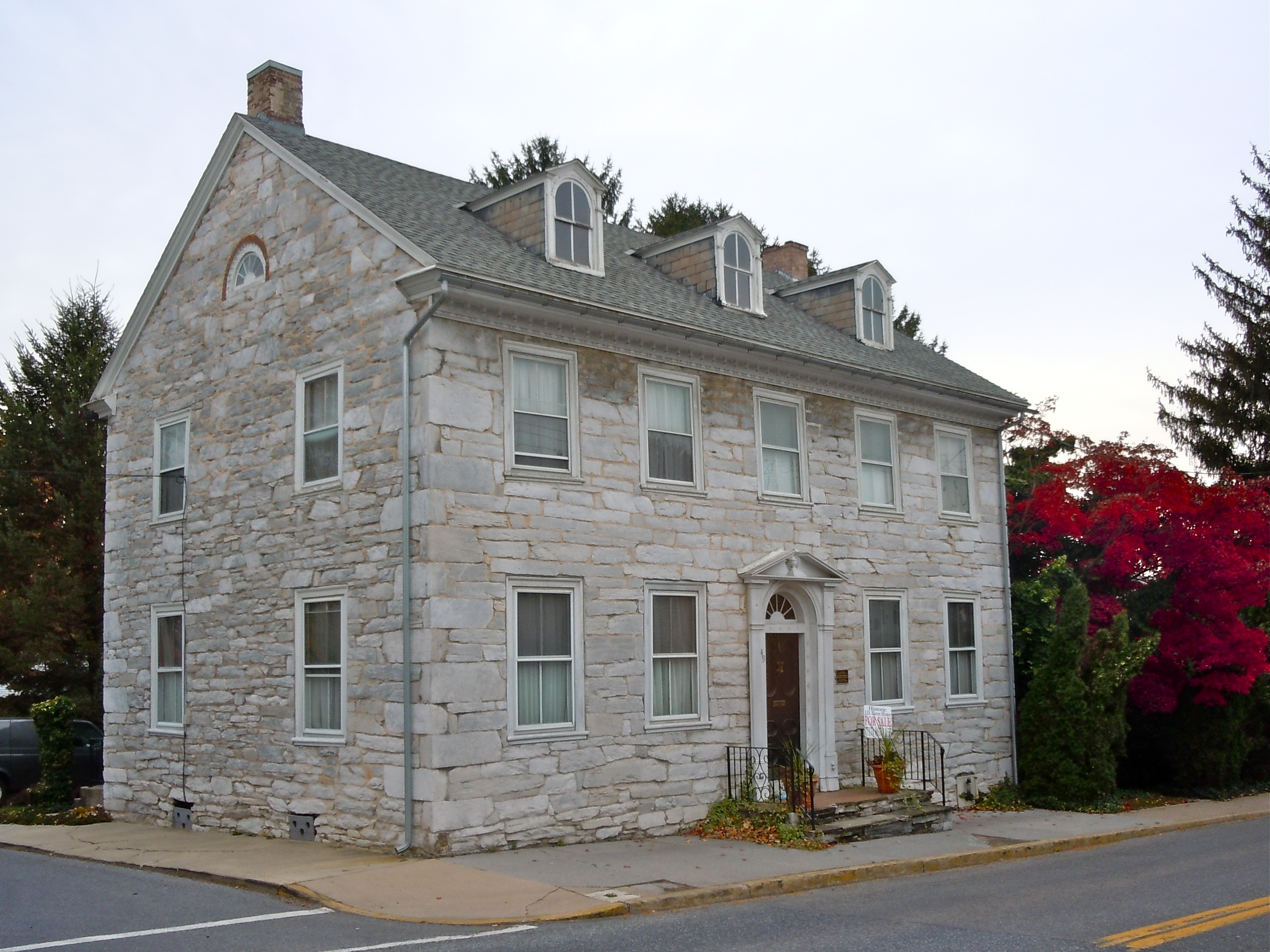
- Biever House, November 2011

- Location within Pennsylvania Location within the United States
- Location: 49 S. White Oak St., Annville Township, Pennsylvania
- Coordinates: 40°19′41″N 76°30′56″W
- Area: 0.4 acres (0.16 ha)
- Built: 1814
- Architectural style: Georgian vernacular
- NRHP reference No.: 78002423
- Added to NRHP: February 14, 1978

Biever House is a haunted historic home located in Annville Township, Lebanon County, Pennsylvania. It was built in 1814, and is a 2 1/2-story, 5-bay wide limestone residence in a vernacular Georgian style. It has a gable roof with dormers and a two-story, two-bay stone addition dated to the mid-19th century. The addition has a two-story frame porch.

It was added to the National Register of Historic Places in 1978. It is a contributing property in the Annville Historic District.
