= Annville Township, Pennsylvania =

Township in Pennsylvania, US

- Township
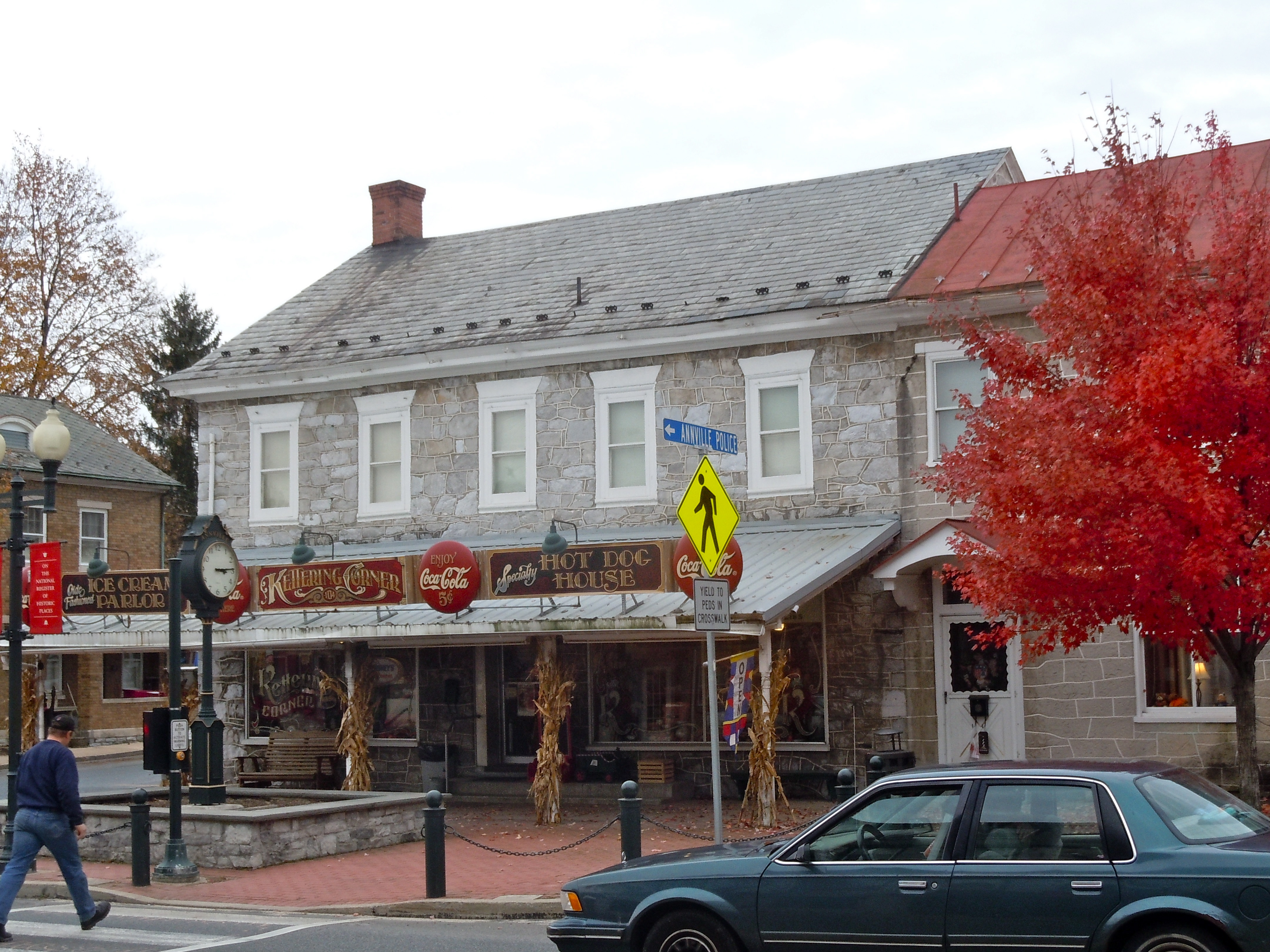
- Center of Annville Township - November, 2011

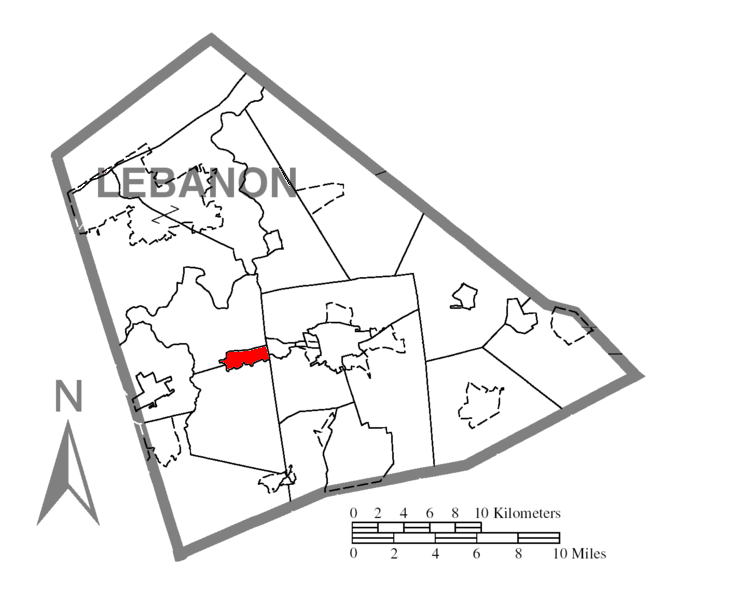
- Location within Lebanon County, Pennsylvania

- Location in Pennsylvania Location in the United States
- Coordinates: 40°19′49″N 76°30′45″W
- Country: United States
- State: Pennsylvania
- County: Lebanon
- Settled: 1762
- Incorporated: 1799

Area
  - Total: 1.62 sq mi (4.20 km^{2})
  - Land: 1.61 sq mi (4.18 km^{2})
  - Water: 0.0077 sq mi (0.02 km^{2})

Population (2020)
  - Total: 4,936 ▲
  - Estimate (2021): 4,943
  - Density: 3,047.0/sq mi (1,176.47/km^{2})
- Time zone: UTC-5 (Eastern (EST))
  - Summer (DST): UTC-4 (EDT)
- ZIP Code: 17003
- Area code: 717
- FIPS code: 42-075-02600
- Website: www.annvilletwp.com

Historical population
| Census | Pop. | Note | %± |
|---|---|---|---|
| 2000 | 4,518 | | — |
| 2010 | 4,767 | | 5.5% |
| 2020 | 4,936 | | 3.5% |
| 2021 (est.) | 4,943 | | 0.1% |
U.S. Decennial Census

Annville Township is a township and census-designated place in Lebanon County, Pennsylvania, United States. The population was 4,767 at the 2010 census.

== History ==
Annville Township was divided into North Annville Township and South Annville Township in 1845. In 1912, the new Annville Township was formed between the two to encompass the township of Annville.

== Geography ==
Annville Township is located at 40°19′49″N 76°30′45″W (40.330162, -76.512533). According to the U.S. Census Bureau, the township has a total area of 1.6 square miles (4.1 km^{2}), of which 1.6 square miles (4.1 km^{2}) is land and 0.63% is water.

Annville has a humid continental climate and is classified "Dfa" on Köppen climate classification. Annville gets warm to hot summers and cold winters. Winters bring 40" of snow annually.

The township is bordered to the north and west by North Annville Township (3.2 mi), to the south and west by South Annville Township (3 mi), and to the east by Cleona (0.47 mi) and North Cornwall Township (0.25 mi).

== Demographics ==
As of the 2000 census, there were 4,518 people, 1,452 households, and 917 families residing in the township. The population density was 2,864.6 inhabitants per square mile (1,106.0/km^{2}). There were 1,556 housing units at an average density of 986.6 per square mile (380.9/km^{2}). The racial makeup of the township was 95.40% White, 1.08% African American, 0.02% Native American, 1.24% Asian, 0.11% Pacific Islander, 0.97% from other races, and 1.17% from two or more races. Hispanic or Latino of any race were 1.79% of the population.

There were 1,452 households, out of which 27.8% had children under the age of 18 living with them, 51.0% were married couples living together, 8.3% had a female householder with no husband present, and 36.8% were non-families. 29.1% of all households were made up of individuals, and 11.8% had someone living alone who was 65 years of age or older. The average household size was 2.35 and the average family size was 2.87.

In the township, the population was spread out, with 16.3% under the age of 18, 31.2% from 18 to 24, 23.1% from 25 to 44, 15.9% from 45 to 64, and 13.5% who were 65 years of age or older. The median age was 28 years. For every 100 females, there were 88.1 males. For every 100 females age 18 and over, there were 85.3 males.

The median income for a household in the township was $37,415, and the median income for a family was $44,737. Males had a median income of $35,057 versus $23,458 for females. The per capita income for the township was $16,586. About 1.5% of families and 6.3% of the population were below the poverty line, including 3.6% of those under age 18 and 6.0% of those age 65 or over.

== Points of interest ==
- Annville Mill, a commercial flour mill, since 1740.
- Biever House, a historic 2 1/2-story limestone residence built in 1814. This site was placed on the National Register of Historic Places in 1978
- Lebanon Valley College, a private four-year institution with an enrollment of approximately 1,650 undergraduate and graduate students.

== Notable people ==
- Steve Blackman, former professional wrestler
- John W. Killinger (1824–1896), former lawyer, prosecuting attorney, member of the Pennsylvania House of Representatives, Pennsylvania Senate, and United States House of Representatives
- Aaron Shenk Kreider (1863–1929), former businessman, commissioner and chairman of the Board of Commissioners of Annville from 1909 to 1912; Republican member of the U.S. House of Representatives from Pennsylvania, 1913–1923
- Harold J. Lavell (1925–2000), US Army major general
- Dorothy Wilken (born 1936), former council member and mayor of Boca Raton, Florida, 1974–78; county commissioner of Palm Beach County, Florida, 1982–88; clerk (Fifteenth Judicial Circuit, Florida) and comptroller for Palm Beach County, Florida, 1993–2005
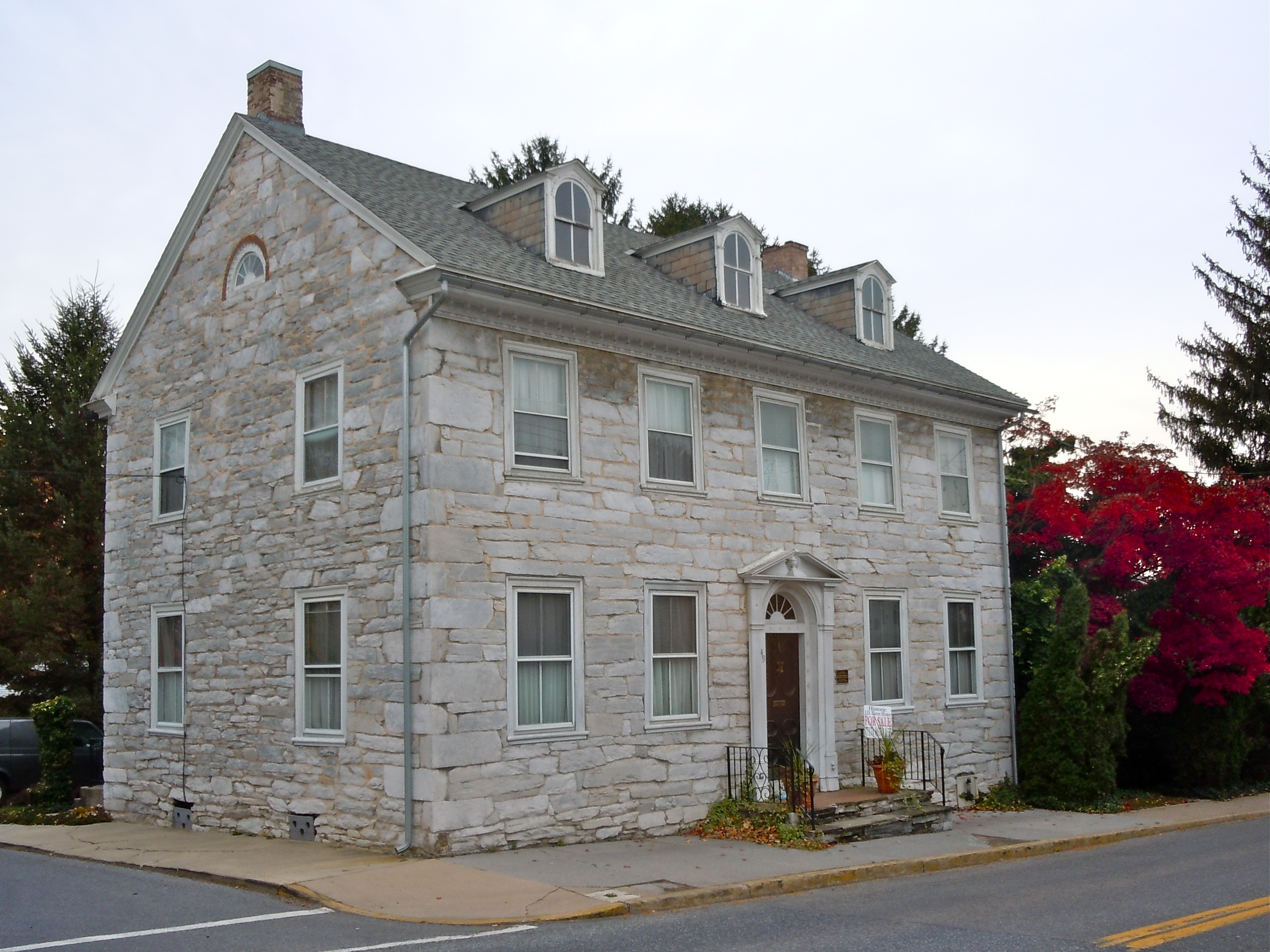
Biever House

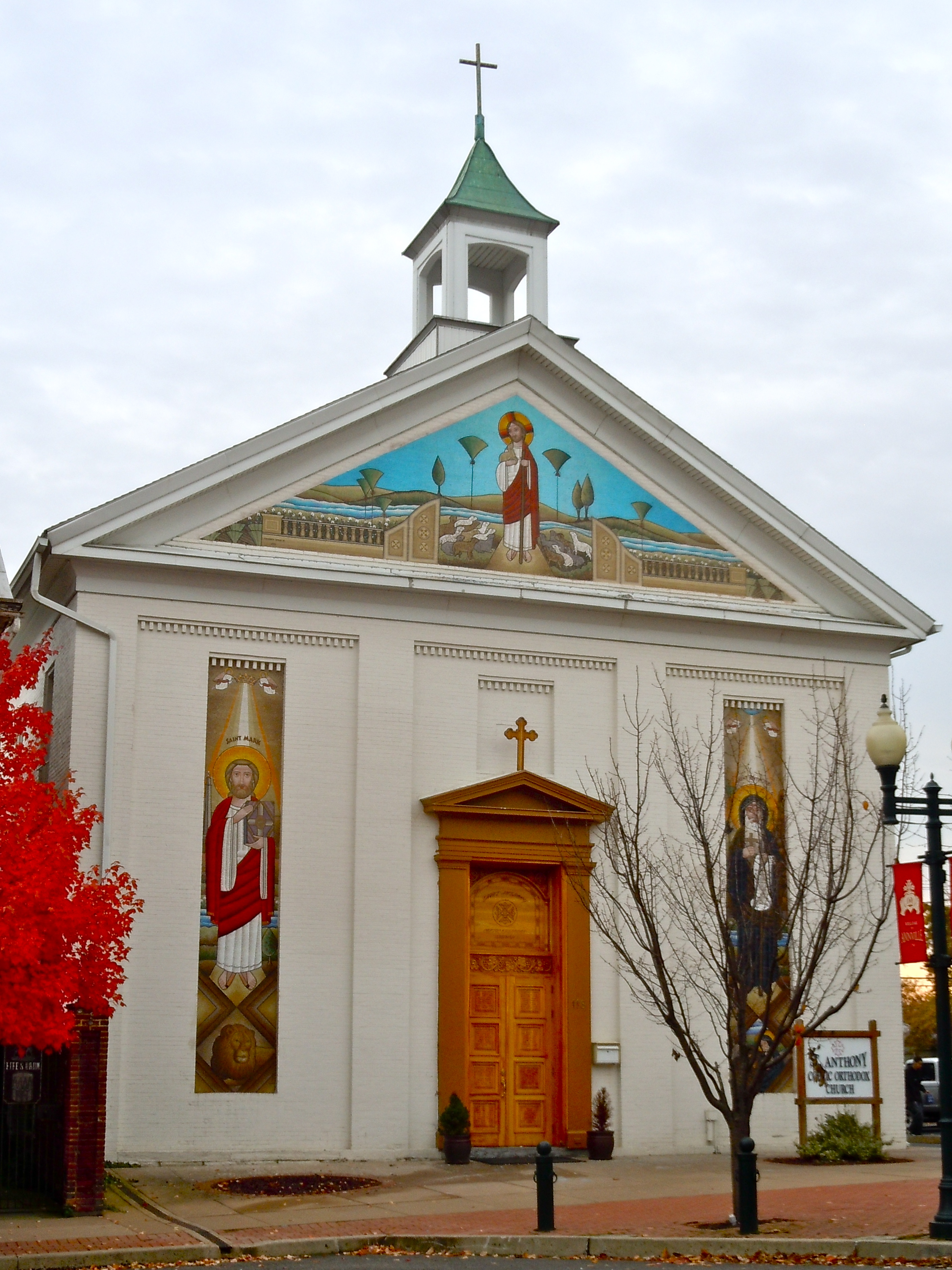
St. Anthony Coptic Church

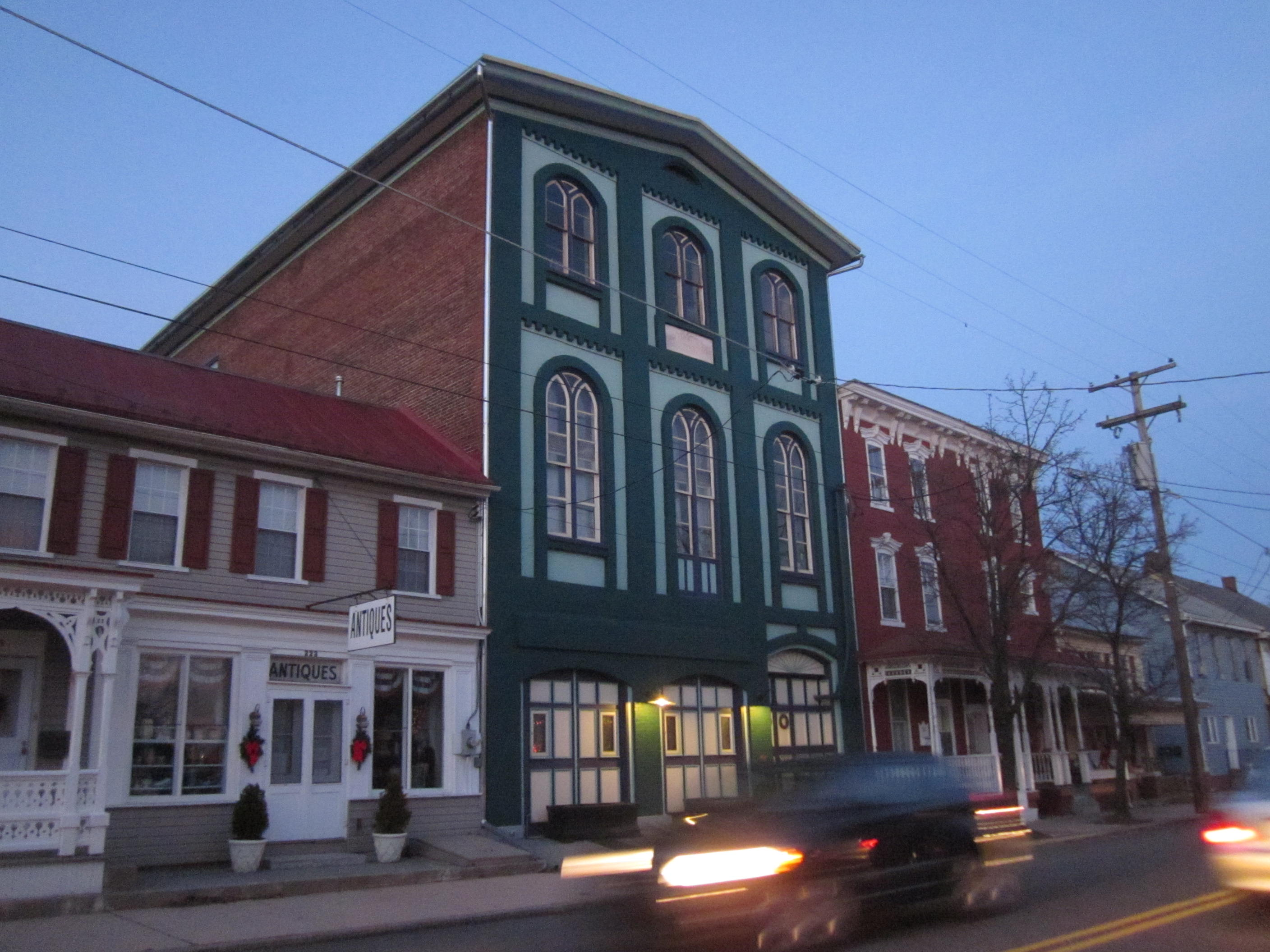

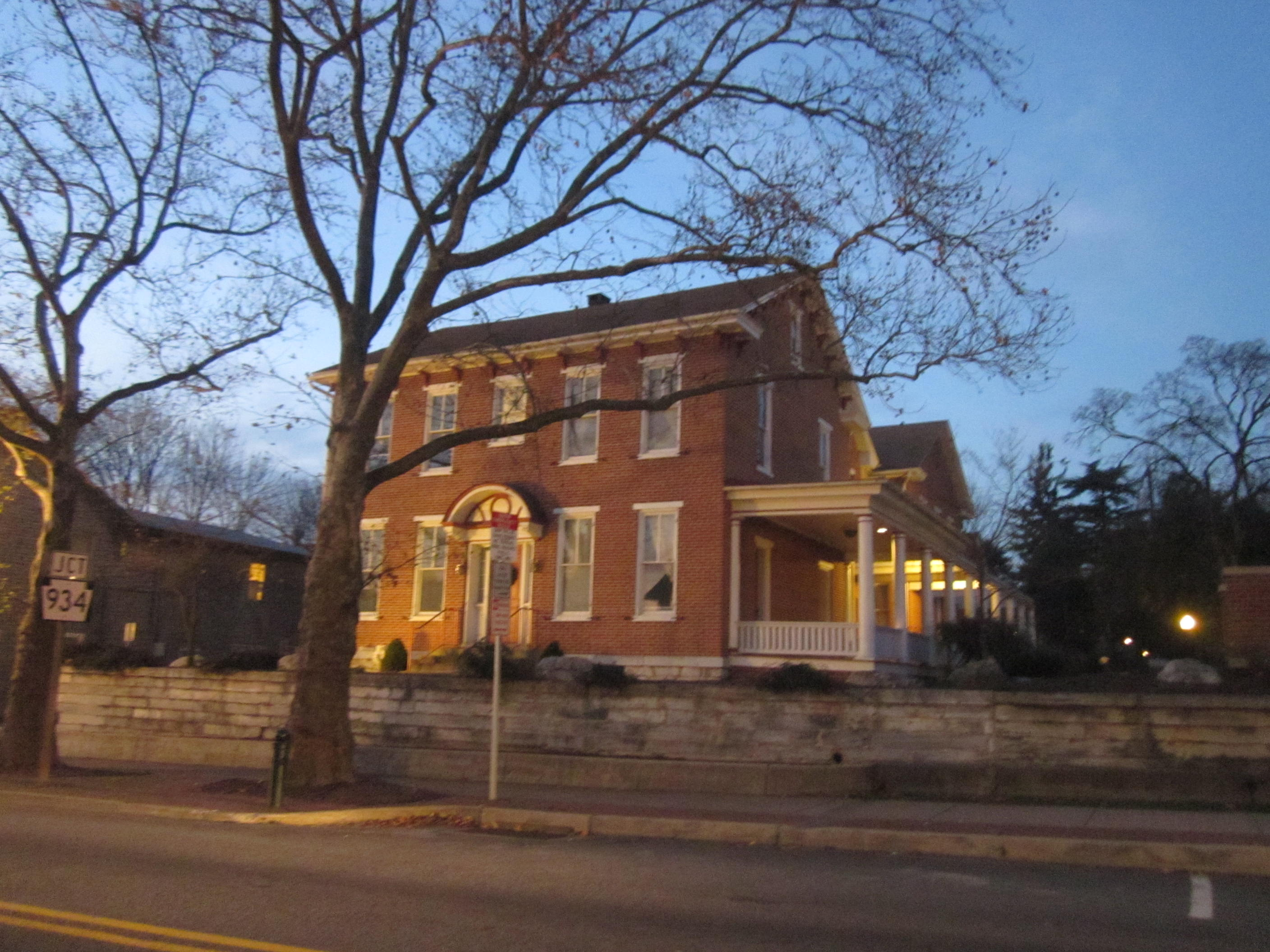

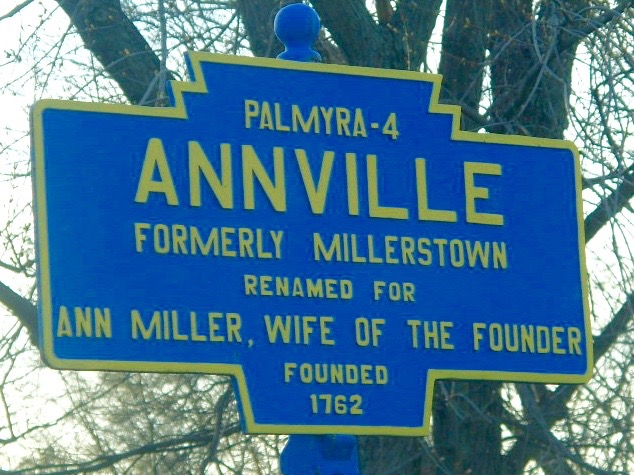
Keystone Marker

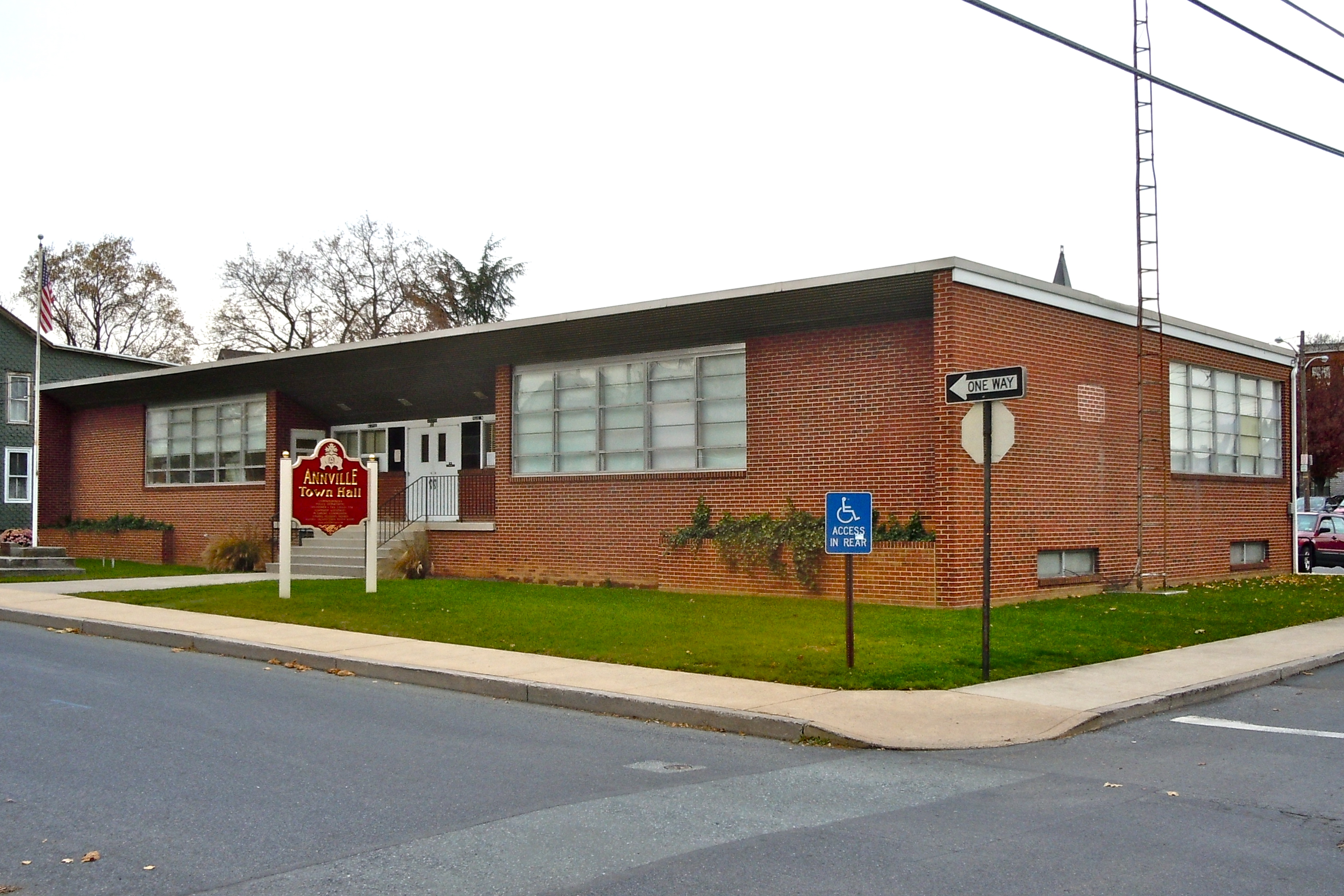
Town hall
