= 2014–15 Charlotte Checkers season =

2014–15 Charlotte Checkers
- Division: 4th West
- Conference: 13th Western Conference
- 2014–15 record: 31–38–6–1
- Home record: 19–16–2–1
- Road record: 12–22–4–0
- Goals for: 172
- Goals against: 231

Team information
- General manager: Jeff Daniels
- Coach: Jeff Daniels
- Arena: Time Warner Cable Arena

Team leaders
- Goals: Justin Shugg (21)
- Assists: Trevor Carrick (25)
- Points: Justin Shugg (43)
- Penalty minutes: Kyle Hagel (154)
- Plus/minus: (+) Roland McKeown (+3) (−) Jared Staal (−23)
- Wins: Drew MacIntyre (20)
- Goals against average: John Muse (2.68)

The 2014–15 Charlotte Checkers season is the American Hockey League franchise's 5th season in the city of Charlotte, North Carolina.

== Standings ==
=== Divisional standings ===
#	Western Conference	Div	GP	W	L	OTL	SOL	Pts	GF	GA
1	y– San Antonio Rampage (FLA)	WT	76	45	23	7	1	98	248	222
2	Texas Stars (DAL)	WT	76	40	22	13	1	94	242	216
3	Oklahoma City Barons (EDM)	WT	76	41	27	5	3	90	224	212
4	Charlotte Checkers (CAR)	WT	76	31	38	6	1	69	172	231
5	Iowa Wild (MIN)	WT	76	23	49	2	2	50	172	245

=== Conference standings ===
#	Western Conference	Div	GP	W	L	OTL	SOL	Pts	GF	GA
1	y– Utica Comets (VAN)	NO	76	47	20	7	2	103	219	182
2	y– Grand Rapids Griffins (DET)	MW	76	46	22	6	2	100	249	185
3	y– San Antonio Rampage (FLA)	WT	76	45	23	7	1	98	248	222
4	x– Rockford IceHogs (CHI)	MW	76	46	23	5	2	99	222	180
5	x– Texas Stars (DAL)	WT	76	40	22	13	1	94	242	216
6	x– Oklahoma City Barons (EDM)	WT	76	41	27	5	3	90	224	212
7	x– Toronto Marlies (TOR)	NO	76	40	27	9	0	89	207	203
8	x– Chicago Wolves (STL)	MW	76	40	29	6	1	87	210	198
9	e– Lake Erie Monsters (COL)	MW	76	35	29	8	4	82	211	240
10	e– Hamilton Bulldogs (MTL)	NO	76	34	29	12	1	81	201	208
11	e– Milwaukee Admirals (NSH)	MW	76	33	28	8	7	81	206	218
12	e– Adirondack Flames (CGY)	NO	76	35	33	6	2	78	233	240
13	e– Charlotte Checkers (CAR)	WT	76	31	38	6	1	69	172	231
14	e– Rochester Americans (BUF)	NO	76	29	41	5	1	64	209	251
15	e– Iowa Wild (MIN)	WT	76	23	49	2	2	50	172	245

y– indicates team has clinched division and a playoff spot
x– indicates team has clinched a playoff spot
e– indicates team has been eliminated from playoff contention

== Schedule and results ==
=== Pre-season ===
2014–15 Preseason Game Log: 0–0–0–0 (Home: 0–0–0–0; Road: 0–0–0–0)

#	Date	Visitor	Score	Home	OT	Decision	Record
1
2

=== Regular season ===
2014–15 Game Log – Regular season

October: 2–6–0–0 (Home: 0–3–0–0; Road: 2–3–0–0)
#	Date	Opponent	Score^{*}	OT	Decision	Attendance	Record	Pts	Recap
1	October 10	@ Milwaukee Admirals	3–6		MacIntyre	5,032	0–1–0–0	0	Gamesheet
2	October 11	@ Chicago Wolves	1–2		Muse	10,399	0–2–0–0	0	Gamesheet
3	October 12	@ Chicago Wolves	2–1	OT	MacIntyre	2,914	1–2–0–0	2	Gamesheet
4	October 17	Grand Rapids Griffins	1–2		MacIntyre	7,277	1–3–0–0	2	Gamesheet
5	October 18	Grand Rapids Griffins	1–4		MacIntyre	5,917	1–4–0–0	2	Gamesheet
6	October 24	@ Iowa Wild	5–1		MacIntyre	4,944	2–4–0–0	4	Gamesheet
7	October 25	@ Iowa Wild	1–4		Muse	6,429	2–5–0–0	4	Gamesheet
8	October 31	Hamilton Bulldogs	1–3		MacIntyre	3,459	2–6–0–0	4	Gamesheet

November: 5–5–1–0 (Home: 5–1–0–0; Road: 0–4–1–0)
#	Date	Opponent	Score^{*}	OT	Decision	Attendance	Record	Pts	Gamesheet
9	November 2	Hamilton Bulldogs	2–1		MacIntyre	3,753	3–6–0–0	6	Gamesheet
10	November 8	Texas Stars	2–8		MacIntyre	7,656	3–7–0–0	6	Gamesheet
11	November 10	Texas Stars	3–1		MacIntyre	3,809	4–7–0–0	8	Gamesheet
12	November 14	@ San Antonio Rampage	1–2	OT	MacIntyre	6,310	4–7–1–0	9	Gamesheet
13	November 15	@ San Antonio Rampage	3–4		MacIntyre	5,223	4–8–1–0	9	Gamesheet
14	November 18	Norfolk Admirals	6–2		Muse	4,012	5–8–1–0	11	Gamesheet
15	November 21	@ Oklahoma City Barons	4–6		MacIntyre	2,969	5–9–1–0	11	Gamesheet
16	November 22	@ Oklahoma City Barons	0–3		Muse	3,300	5–10–1–0	11	Gamesheet
17	November 26	@ Norfolk Admirals	1–4		MacIntyre	3,506	5–11–1–0	11	Gamesheet
18	November 29	Milwaukee Admirals	5–4		MacIntyre	7,864	6–11–1–0	13	Gamesheet
19	November 30	Milwaukee Admirals	3–2	SO	MacIntyre	3,958	7–11–1–0	15	Gamesheet

December: 4–6–2–1 (Home: 3–2–1–1; Road: 1–4–1–0)
#	Date	Opponent	Score^{*}	OT	Decision	Attendance	Record	Pts	Recap
20	December 2	Norfolk Admirals	2–3	OT	Muse	3,332	7–11–2–0	16	Gamesheet
21	December 6	Iowa Wild	2–1		MacIntyre	6,985	8–11–2–0	18	Gamesheet
22	December 8	Iowa Wild	3–4		MacIntyre	3,408	8–12–2–0	18	Gamesheet
23	December 10	@ Norfolk Admirals	0–3		Muse	2,619	8–13–2–0	18	Gamesheet
24	December 12	@ Texas Stars	1–3		MacIntyre	4,914	8–14–2–0	18	Gamesheet
25	December 13	@ Texas Stars	3–1		MacIntyre	4,853	9–14–2–0	20	Gamesheet
26	December 16	Oklahoma City Barons	1–4		MacIntyre	4,212	9–15–2–0	20	Gamesheet
27	December 18	Oklahoma City Barons	4–2		Muse	5,341	10–15–2–0	22	Gamesheet
28	December 19	San Antonio Rampage	2–3	SO	MacIntyre	6,226	10–15–2–1	23	Gamesheet
29	December 21	San Antonio Rampage	3–1		MacIntyre	6,738	11–15–2–1	25	Gamesheet
30	December 27	@ Texas Stars	2–4		Muse	5,357	11–16–2–1	25	Gamesheet
31	December 28	@ Oklahoma City Barons	1–2	OT	Muse	3,026	11–16–3–1	26	Gamesheet
32	December 31	@ Oklahoma City Barons	2–4		Muse	3,809	11–17–3–1	26	Gamesheet

January: 5–6–2–0 (Home: 3–3–0–0; Road: 2–3–2–0)
#	Date	Opponent	Score^{*}	OT	Decision	Attendance	Record	Pts	Recap
33	January 3	Texas Stars	1–4		Muse	7,133	11–18–3–1	26	Gamesheet
34	January 4	Texas Stars	5–2		MacIntyre	5,849	12–18–3–1	28	Gamesheet
35	January 7	@ Grand Rapids Griffins	2–3	OT	MacIntyre	4,221	12–18–4–1	29	Gamesheet
36	January 9	@ Grand Rapids Griffins	2–1		MacIntyre	7,669	13–18–4–1	31	Gamesheet
37	January 10	@ Milwaukee Admirals	0–5		Muse	5,939	13–19–4–1	31	Gamesheet
38	January 13	@ Rockford IceHogs	3–2	SO	MacIntyre	2,515	14–19–4–1	33	Gamesheet
39	January 15	Toronto Marlies	1–4		MacIntyre	5,191	14–20–4–1	33	Gamesheet
40	January 16	Toronto Marlies	4–1		Muse	8,462	15–20–4–1	35	Gamesheet
41	January 21	@ Norfolk Admirals	2–3	OT	MacIntyre	3,150	15–20–5–1	36	Gamesheet
42	January 22	Oklahoma City Barons	1–3		Muse	4,912	15–21–5–1	36	Gamesheet
43	January 23	Oklahoma City Barons	3–2		MacIntyre	8,398	16–21–5–1	38	Gamesheet
44	January 30	@ San Antonio Rampage	2–5		MacIntyre	7,605	16–22–5–1	38	Gamesheet
45	January 31	@ Texas Stars	0–4		MacIntyre	5,268	16–23–5–1	38	Gamesheet

February: 5–6–0–0 (Home: 3–2–0–0; Road: 2–4–0–0)
#	Date	Opponent	Score^{*}	OT	Decision	Attendance	Record	Pts	Recap
46	February 6	Chicago Wolves	1–4		MacIntyre	8,058	16–24–5–1	38	Gamesheet
47	February 7	Chicago Wolves	1–4		MacIntyre	8,612	16–25–5–1	38	Gamesheet
48	February 10	@ Lake Erie Monsters	2–1		Muse	3,048	17–25–5–1	40	Gamesheet
49	February 12	@ Lake Erie Monsters	2–3		MacIntyre	5,147	17–26–5–1	40	Gamesheet
50	February 16	Norfolk Admirals	4–3	SO	Muse	2,824	18–26–5–1	42	Gamesheet
51	February 18	Iowa Wild	4–1		MacIntyre	3,692	19–26–5–1	44	Gamesheet
52	February 19	Iowa Wild	4–2		Muse	4,892	20–26–5–1	46	Gamesheet
53	February 22	@ Toronto Marlies	3–6		MacIntyre	6,125	20–27–5–1	46	Gamesheet
54	February 25	@ Toronto Marlies	1–4		Muse	7,851	20–28–5–1	46	Gamesheet
55	February 27	@ Hamilton Bulldogs	0–4		MacIntyre	4,027	20–29–5–1	46	Gamesheet
56	February 28	@ Hamilton Bulldogs	4–3	OT	Muse	3,811	21–29–5–1	48	Gamesheet

March: 7–6–0–0 (Home: 3–4–0–0; Road: 4–2–0–0)
#	Date	Opponent	Score^{*}	OT	Decision	Attendance	Record	Pts	Recap
57	March 4	San Antonio Rampage	3–2	SO	MacIntyre	3,056	22–29–5–1	50	Gamesheet
58	March 5	San Antonio Rampage	2–5		Muse	4,056	22–30–5–1	50	Gamesheet
59	March 8	Norfolk Admirals	4–2		MacIntyre	7,956	23–30–5–1	52	Gamesheet
60	March 10	Grand Rapids Griffins	2–3		MacIntyre	3,917	23–31–5–1	52	Gamesheet
61	March 12	Grand Rapids Griffins	2–1	SO	MacIntyre	4,903	24–31–5–1	54	Gamesheet
62	March 14	@ Oklahoma City Barons	2–1		Muse	2,999	25–31–5–1	56	Gamesheet
63	March 15	@ Oklahoma City Barons	1–6		MacIntyre	2,652	25–32–5–1	56	Gamesheet
64	March 17	@ San Antonio Rampage	3–9		MacIntyre	4,132	25–33–5–1	56	Gamesheet
65	March 21	@ Iowa Wild	3–2		MacIntyre	7,167	26–33–5–1	58	Gamesheet
66	March 22	@ Iowa Wild	4–2		Muse	4,891	27–33–5–1	60	Gamesheet
67	March 25	@ Norfolk Admirals	3–2		MacIntyre	2,857	28–33–5–1	62	Gamesheet
68	March 27	Lake Erie Monsters	2–3		MacIntyre	7,934	28–34–5–1	62	Gamesheet
69	March 29	Lake Erie Monsters	1–5		MacIntyre	7,077	28–35–5–1	62	Gamesheet

April: 3–3–1–0 (Home: 2–1–1–0; Road: 1–2–0–0)
#	Date	Opponent	Score^{*}	OT	Decision	Attendance	Record	Pts	Recap
70	April 2	Oklahoma City Barons	2–3	OT	MacIntyre	4,215	28–35–6–1	63	Gamesheet
71	April 3	Oklahoma City Barons	2–1		Muse	7,008	29–35–6–1	65	Gamesheet
72	April 11	Rockford IceHogs	0–2		MacIntyre	13,219	29–36–6–1	65	Gamesheet
73	April 12	Rockford IceHogs	4–3		Tirronen	5,938	30–36–6–1	67	Gamesheet
74	April 15	@ Rockford IceHogs	1–5		Muse	5,545	30–37–6–1	67	Gamesheet
75	April 17	@ Grand Rapids Griffins	1–2		MacIntyre	9,264	30–38–6–1	67	Gamesheet
76	April 18	@ Grand Rapids Griffins	7–3		MacIntyre	9,804	31–38–6–1	69	Gamesheet

Legend: Win (2 points) Loss (0 points) Overtime/shootout loss (1-point) ^{*}Score shows Charlotte goals first

== Player statistics ==
=== Skaters ===
Note: GP = Games played; G = Goals; A = Assists; Pts = Points; +/− = Plus/minus; PIM = Penalty minutes

Regular season
Player	GP	G	A	Pts	+/-	PIM
Justin Shugg	65	21	22	43	−20	28
Chad LaRose	64	20	18	38	−8	44
Trevor Carrick^{*}	76	7	25	32	−19	94
Brendan Woods	68	13	17	30	−10	101
Phil Di Giuseppe^{*}	76	11	19	30	−10	20
Brock McGinn^{*}	73	15	12	27	−18	38
Brody Sutter	45	12	13	25	−13	17
Zach Boychuk	39	12	12	24	−13	14
Alex Aleardi	48	12	11	23	−3	18
Ben Holmstrom	62	5	15	20	−16	92
Dennis Robertson^{*}	57	3	14	17	+1	70
Ryan Murphy	25	0	17	17	−7	10
Greg Nemisz	21	8	6	14	+1	6
Danny Biega	69	2	12	14	−20	89
Jared Staal	63	7	4	11	−23	27
Michal Jordán	30	2	9	11	−12	4
Keegan Lowe	58	2	9	11	−16	106
Rasmus Rissanen	52	1	10	11	−7	69
Patrick Brown^{*}	60	2	8	10	−11	34
Beau Schmitz	38	0	7	7	−17	26
AJ Jenks	27	2	4	6	−7	12
Mike Cornell^{†}	18	1	4	5	−1	76
Andrew Rowe	28	1	4	5	−8	8
Carter Sandlak^{*}	44	2	2	4	−10	69
Kyle Hagel	73	2	2	4	−13	154
Mario Lamoureux^{†*}	3	2	0	2	0	2
Chris Terry	5	1	1	2	−2	4
Kyle Jean^{‡}	8	0	2	2	0	4
Haydn Fleury^{*}	1	1	0	1	−1	0
Thomas Frazee^{*}	3	0	1	1	0	4
Roland McKeown^{*}	4	0	1	1	+3	0
Brett Pesce^{*}	4	0	1	1	+2	6
Jason Bast^{†*}	4	0	1	1	−1	0
Gabriel Desjardins^{*}	12	0	1	1	−6	4
Austin Levi^{*}	15	0	1	1	−6	6
Josh Wesley^{*}	1	0	0	0	−2	0
Mike Aviani^{*}	2	0	0	0	0	2
Andrej Nestrašil	3	0	0	0	0	17
Stephane Pattyn^{*}	3	0	0	0	−2	2
Mike Little^{‡}	4	0	0	0	0	2
Jordan Henry	5	0	0	0	0	4
Sean Dolan	12	0	0	0	−1	4

^{†}Denotes player spent time with another team before joining team. Stats reflect time with the team only.
^{‡}Left the team mid-season
^{*}Rookie

=== Goaltenders ===
Note: GP = Games played; TOI = Time on ice; W = Wins; L = Losses; GA = Goals against; GAA = Goals against average; SV = Saves; SA = Shots against; SV% = Save percentage; SO = Shutouts; G = Goals; A = Assists; PIM = Penalty minutes

Regular season
Player	GP	TOI	W	L	GA	GAA	SV	SA	SV%	SO	G	A	PIM
John Muse	29	1,611:35	10	14	72	2.68	788	860	.916	0	0	0	15
Drew MacIntyre	51	2,935:22	20	31	139	2.84	1474	1613	.914	0	0	0	4
Rasmus Tirronen	1	60:00	1	0	3	3.00	32	35	.914	0	0	0	0
Totals		4,606:57	31	45	214	2.79	2,294	2,508	.915	0	0	0	19

^{‡}Left the team mid-season
^{*}Rookie

== Roster ==
Updated March 3, 2015.

No.	Nat	Player	Pos	S/G	Age	Acquired	Birthplace	Contract
17	(United States)	Alex Aleardi	RW	R	22	2014	Ft. Wayne, Indiana	Checkers
9	(Canada)	Danny Biega	D	R	23	2013	Montreal, Quebec	Hurricanes
24	(United States)	Patrick Brown	C	R	22	2014	Bloomfield Hills, Michigan	Hurricanes
5	(Canada)	Trevor Carrick	D	R	20	2014	Stouffville, Ontario	Hurricanes
8	(United States)	Mike Cornell (PTO)	D	R	27	2015	Franklin, Massachusetts	Checkers
	(United States)	Sean Dolan (PTO)	C	R	27	2015	Chesterfield, Missouri	Checkers
28	(Canada)	Phil Di Giuseppe	C	L	21	2014	Maple, Ontario	Hurricanes
18	(Canada)	Kyle Hagel	RW	L	30	2014	Hamilton, Ontario	Checkers
10	(United States)	Ben Holmstrom (A)	C	R	28	2014	Colorado Springs, Colorado	Hurricanes
59	(United States)	Chad LaRose (A)	RW	R	33	2014	Fraser, Michigan	Checkers
32	(United States)	Austin Levi	D	L	23	2012	Aurora, Colorado	Hurricanes
4	(Canada)	Keegan Lowe	D	L	22	2013	Edmonton, Alberta	Hurricanes
35	(Canada)	Drew MacIntyre	G	L	31	2014	Charlottetown, Prince Edward Island	Hurricanes
7	(Canada)	Brock McGinn	LW	L	21	2013	Fergus, Ontario	Hurricanes
30	(United States)	John Muse	G	L	26	2011	East Falmouth, Massachusetts	Checkers
19	(Canada)	Greg Nemisz (A)	RW	R	24	2013	Courtice, Ontario	Hurricanes
20	(Canada)	Dennis Robertson	D	L	23	2014	Fort St. John, British Columbia	Hurricanes
26	(Canada)	Carter Sandlak	LW	L	21	2014	London, Ontario	Hurricanes
36	(United States)	Beau Schmitz	D	R	24	2012	Howell, Michigan	Hurricanes
14	(Canada)	Justin Shugg	LW	R	23	2011	Niagara Falls, Ontario	Hurricanes
22	(Canada)	Jared Staal	RW	R	24	2010	Thunder Bay, Ontario	Hurricanes
12	(Canada)	Brody Sutter	C	R	23	2012	Viking, Alberta	Hurricanes
21	(Canada)	Brendan Woods	C	L	22	2013	Humboldt, Saskatchewan	Hurricanes

== Awards and records ==
=== Awards ===
Player	Award	Awarded
Kyle Hagel	Yanick Dupre Memorial Award	April 11
