= Jonathan Eshenour Memorial Trail =

13-mile trail

- Length: 13.5 miles
- Trailheads: Grove St., S. Lingle Ave
- Use: Hiking, biking, inline skating, running
- Difficulty: Easy, smooth, ADA accessible
- Surface: Asphalt

The Jonathan Eshenour Memorial Trail is a 13.5-mile trail that extends through the Hershey community in Dauphin County, Pennsylvania.

== Historical development ==
The Jonathan Eshenour Memorial Trail was constructed after the death of Jonathan Eshenour in 1997. The trail path is paved, stretching for 13.5 miles through rural and commercial areas. The trail's design links it with other landmarks in the Derry township, such as the Bullfrog Valley Park, Shank Park and the Hershey Medical Center. It also connects the towns of Palmyra, Pennsylvania with Hummelstown, Pennsylvania through Derry Township. The trail is wheelchair-accessible, with minimal grades.

The Jonathan Eshenour Foundation raises some of its funds through the Hike It Bike It For Jon Event, which is held each spring on the trail. These funds go towards the expansion of the trail system.
