= Landis Shoe Company Building =

- U.S. National Register of Historic Places
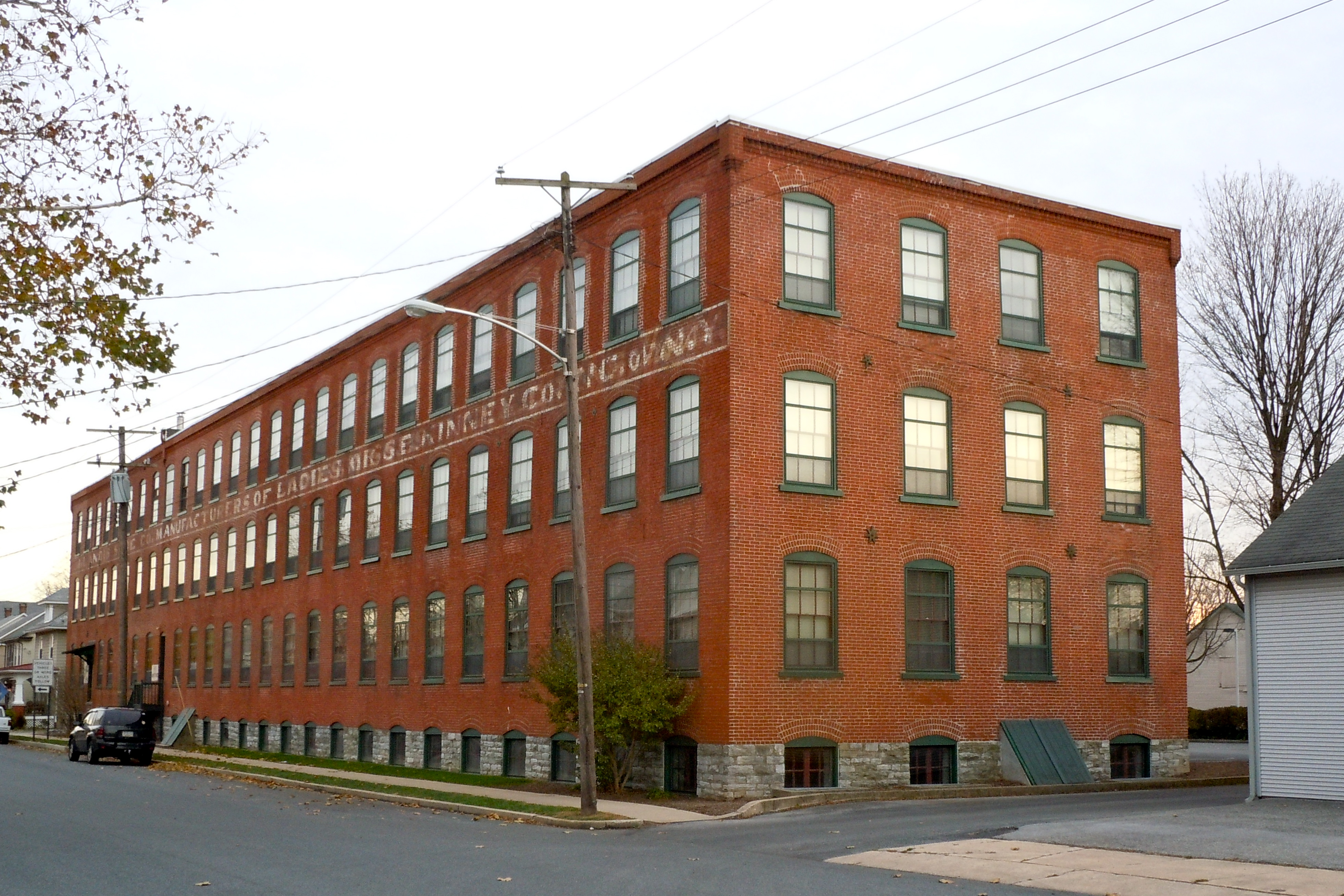
- Landis Shoe Company Building, November 2011

- Location within Pennsylvania Location within the United States
- Location: N. Chestnut and E. Broad Sts., Palmyra, Pennsylvania
- Coordinates: 40°18′37″N 76°35′50″W
- Area: 1 acre (0.40 ha)
- Built: 1905-1906, 1911
- NRHP reference No.: 80003550
- Added to NRHP: August 29, 1980

Landis Shoe Company Building is a historic factory building located at Palmyra, Lebanon County, Pennsylvania. It was built in 1905-1906 and expanded in 1911, and is a three-story, brick building on a stone foundation. It is 26 bays wide by 4 bays deep.

It was added to the National Register of Historic Places in 1980.

== See also ==
- Hoyt Shoe Factory: NRHP-listed shoe factory in Manchester, New Hampshire
- Kimball Brothers Shoe Factory: NRHP-listed shoe factory in Manchester, New Hampshire
