= Kramer Williamson =

American sprint car racing driver (1950–2013)

- Nationality: (United States) American
- Born: June 26, 1950 Columbus, Ohio, United States
- Died: August 4, 2013 (aged 63) York, Pennsylvania, United States

United Racing Company Sprint Cars

Championship titles
- 1991, 1992, 1995: United Racing Company Sprint Cars

Kramer Earl Williamson (June 26, 1950 – August 4, 2013) was an American sprint car racing driver. A native of Pennsylvania, he was a feature winner in World of Outlaws and United Racing Company competition, and a 2008 inductee of the National Sprint Car Hall of Fame. He was fatally injured in a racing accident at Lincoln Speedway.

== Career ==
Williamson was a resident of Palmyra, Pennsylvania. He kept his age a secret but had been racing for over forty years at the time of his death. He shared the rookie of the year title at Williams Grove Speedway, Mechanicsburg, Pennsylvania, in 1971.

Williamson, known for driving a bright pink car, was inducted into the National Sprint Car Hall of Fame in 2008. He was a champion in the United Racing Company sprint car series in 1991, 1992 and 1995.

On August 3, 2013, Williamson's car collided with another car and rolled over on the fourth lap of a 10-lap qualifying round at Lincoln Speedway in Abbottstown, Pennsylvania. He was airlifted to York Hospital in York, Pennsylvania, where he died on August 4.
