= 2014–15 Grand Rapids Griffins season =

American Hockey League team season

2014–15 Grand Rapids Griffins
- Division: 1st Midwest Division
- Conference: 2nd Western Conference
- 2014–15 record: 46–22–6–2
- Home record: 23–10–4–1
- Road record: 23–12–2–1
- Goals for: 249
- Goals against: 185

Team information
- General manager: Dan DeVos
- Coach: Jeff Blashill
- Assistant coach: Jim Paek; Spiros Anastas
- Captain: Jeff Hoggan
- Arena: Van Andel Arena
- Average attendance: 8,082 (74.6%); Total: 307,110

Team leaders
- Goals: Teemu Pulkkinen (34)
- Assists: Andy Miele (44)
- Points: Andy Miele (70)
- Penalty minutes: Chris Bruton (124)
- Plus/minus: (+) Tomáš Nosek; Nick Jensen (30) (−) Kevin Porter (−11)
- Wins: Tom McCollum (19)
- Goals against average: Petr Mrázek (2.06)

The 2014–15 Grand Rapids Griffins season was the franchise's 14th season in the American Hockey League.

== Regular season ==
The Griffins set a franchise record 19-game point streak, beginning on February 4, and ending on March 21. The streak was the longest in the AHL since the Norfolk Admirals concluded the 2011–12 season with 28 consecutive wins.

== Standings ==
=== Divisional standings ===
#	Midwest Division	GP	W	L	OTL	SOL	Pts	GF	GA
1	Grand Rapids Griffins (DRW)	76	46	22	6	2	100	249	185
2	Rockford IceHogs (CHI)	76	46	23	5	2	99	222	180
3	Chicago Wolves (SLB)	76	40	29	6	1	87	210	198
4	Lake Erie (COL)	76	35	29	8	4	82	211	240
5	Milwaukee Admirals (NAS)	76	33	28	8	7	81	206	218

y– indicates team has clinched division and a playoff spot
x– indicates team has clinched a playoff spot
e– indicates team has been eliminated from playoff contention

=== Conference standings ===
#	Western Conference	Div	GP	W	L	OTL	SOL	Pts	GF	GA
1	y– Utica Comets (VAN)	NO	76	47	20	7	2	103	219	182
2	y– Grand Rapids Griffins (DET)	MW	76	46	22	6	2	100	249	185
3	y– San Antonio Rampage (FLA)	WT	76	45	23	7	1	98	248	222
4	x– Rockford IceHogs (CHI)	MW	76	46	23	5	2	99	222	180
5	x– Texas Stars (DAL)	WT	76	40	22	13	1	94	242	216
6	x– Oklahoma City Barons (EDM)	WT	76	41	27	5	3	90	224	212
7	x– Toronto Marlies (TOR)	NO	76	40	27	9	0	87	207	203
8	x– Chicago Wolves (STL)	MW	76	40	29	6	1	87	210	198
9	e– Lake Erie Monsters (COL)	MW	76	35	29	8	4	82	211	240
10	e– Hamilton Bulldogs (MTL)	NO	76	34	29	12	1	81	201	208
11	e– Milwaukee Admirals (NSH)	MW	76	33	28	8	7	81	206	218
12	e– Adirondack Flames (CGY)	NO	76	35	33	6	2	78	233	240
13	e– Charlotte Checkers (CAR)	WT	76	31	38	6	1	69	172	231
14	e– Rochester Americans (BUF)	NO	76	29	41	5	1	64	209	251
15	e– Iowa Wild (MIN)	WT	76	23	49	2	2	50	172	245

== Schedule and results ==
=== Pre-season ===
2014–15 preseason game log: 0–2–0–0

#	Date	Visitor	Score	Home	OT	Decision	Record
1	October 3^{1}	Lake Erie	5–2	Grand Rapids		McCollum	0–1–0–0
2	October 4^{2}	Grand Rapids	3–6	Lake Erie		Coreau	0–2–0–0
Game played at WFCU Centre in Windsor, Ontario; Game played at Allen County War Memorial Coliseum in Fort Wayne, Indiana

=== Regular season ===
2014–15 Regular season Game Log

October: 3–3–1–0 (Home: 0–3–1–0; Road: 3–0–0–0)
#	Date	Visitor	Score	Home	OT	Decision	Attendance	Record	Pts	Gamesheet
1	October 10	Lake Erie	4–0	Grand Rapids		Mrazek	10,834	0–1–0–0	0	Gamesheet
2	October 11	Grand Rapids	3–2	Lake Erie		McCollum	13,135	1–1–0–0	2	Gamesheet
3	October 17	Grand Rapids	2–1	Charlotte		Mrazek	7,277	2–1–0–0	4	Gamesheet
4	October 18	Grand Rapids	4–1	Charlotte		McCollum	5,917	3–1–0–0	6	Gamesheet
5	October 24	Lake Erie	5–4	Grand Rapids		Mrazek	6,064	3–2–0–0	6	Gamesheet
6	October 29	Rockford	2–1	Grand Rapids		McCollum	3,331	3–3–0–0	6	Gamesheet
7	October 31	Chicago	6–5	Grand Rapids	OT	McCollum	4,244	3–3–1–0	7	Gamesheet

November: 6–4–1–0 (Home: 4–1–0–0; Road: 2–3–1–0)
#	Date	Visitor	Score	Home	OT	Decision	Attendance	Record	Pts	Gamesheet
8	November 5	Chicago	3–1	Grand Rapids		McCollum	5,278	3–4–1–0	7	Gamesheet
9	November 7	Grand Rapids	0–4	Milwaukee		McCollum	5,702	3–5–1–0	7	Gamesheet
10	November 8	Grand Rapids	1–3	Rockford		McCollum	4,878	3–6–1–0	7	Gamesheet
11	November 12	Lake Erie	3–5	Grand Rapids		Mrazek	3,798	4–6–1–0	9	Gamesheet
12	November 14	Texas	2–3	Grand Rapids	OT	Mrazek	8,183	5–6–1–0	11	Gamesheet
13	November 15	Texas	1–2	Grand Rapids	OT	McCollum	8,009	6–6–1–0	13	Gamesheet
14	November 21	Grand Rapids	4–5	Lake Erie		McCollum	7,384	6–7–1–0	13	Gamesheet
15	November 22	Lake Erie	2–5	Grand Rapids		McCollum	8,067	7–7–1–0	15	Gamesheet
16	November 26	Grand Rapids	3–1	Rochester		McCollum	4,399	8–7–1–0	17	Gamesheet
17	November 28	Grand Rapids	3–4	Rochester	OT	McCollum	7,107	8–7–2–0	18	Gamesheet
18	November 29	Grand Rapids	6–1	Adirondack		Coreau	5,300	9–7–2–0	20	Gamesheet

December: 7–4–1–1 (Home: 2–1–1–1; Road: 5–3–0–0)
#	Date	Visitor	Score	Home	OT	Decision	Attendance	Record	Pts	Gamesheet
19	December 2	Grand Rapids	2–4	Toronto		McCollum	3,369	9–8–2–0	20	Gamesheet
20	December 5	Oklahoma City	4–1	Grand Rapids		McCollum	8,722	9–9–2–0	20	Gamesheet
21	December 6	Grand Rapids	4–0	Rockford		Coreau	5,349	10–9–2–0	22	Gamesheet
22	December 7	Grand Rapids	2–1	Milwaukee	SO	Coreau	3,238	11–9–2–0	24	Gamesheet
23	December 10	Lake Erie	3–2	Grand Rapids	OT	McCollum	5,488	11–9–3–0	25	Gamesheet
24	December 12	Grand Rapids	5–2	Oklahoma City		Coreau	3,797	12–9–3–0	27	Gamesheet
25	December 13	Grand Rapids	2–3	Oklahoma City		McCollum	4,061	12–10–3–0	27	Gamesheet
26	December 19	Toronto	1–7	Grand Rapids		Coreau	8,236	13–10–3–0	29	Gamesheet
27	December 20	Grand Rapids	4–3	Lake Erie	SO	Coreau	11,056	14–10–3–0	31	Gamesheet
28	December 22	Grand Rapids	3–5	Chicago		Coreau	5,155	14–11–3–0	31	Gamesheet
29	December 27	Iowa	2–9	Grand Rapids		McCollum	10,834	15–11–3–0	33	Gamesheet
30	December 30	Grand Rapids	2–1	Chicago	OT	McCollum	6,179	16–11–3–0	35	Gamesheet
31	December 31	Rockford	3–2	Grand Rapids	SO	Coreau	10,834	16–11–3–1	36	Gamesheet

January: 7–6–0–0 (Home: 5–3–0–0; Road: 2–3–0–0)
#	Date	Visitor	Score	Home	OT	Decision	Attendance	Record	Pts	Gamesheet
32	January 2	Milwaukee	2–4	Grand Rapids		McCollum	7,421	17–11–3–1	38	Gamesheet
33	January 7	Charlotte	2–3	Grand Rapids	OT	McCollum	4,221	18–11–3–1	40	Gamesheet
34	January 9	Charlotte	2–1	Grand Rapids		Coreau	7,669	18–12–3–1	40	Gamesheet
35	January 10	Chicago	1–5	Grand Rapids		McCollum	8,804	19–12–3–1	42	Gamesheet
36	January 14	Grand Rapids	2–4	Utica		Coreau	3,395	19–13–3–1	42	Gamesheet
37	January 16	Grand Rapids	1–2	Hamilton		Coreau	3,619	19–14–3–1	42	Gamesheet
38	January 17	Grand Rapids	2–5	Hamilton		Coreau	4,766	19–15–3–1	42	Gamesheet
39	January 21	Chicago	4–2	Grand Rapids		Coreau	7,037	19–16–3–1	42	Gamesheet
40	January 23	Utica	1–5	Grand Rapids		Nagle	9,504	20–16–3–1	44	Gamesheet
41	January 24	Iowa	3–4	Grand Rapids		Coreau	10,834	21–16–3–1	46	Gamesheet
42	January 29	Grand Rapids	6–0	Iowa		Coreau	3,408	22–16–3–1	48	Gamesheet
43	January 30	Grand Rapids	3–0	Milwaukee		Coreau	6,179	23–16–3–1	50	Gamesheet
44	January 31	Milwaukee	4–0	Grand Rapids		Gustavsson	8,767	23–17–3–1	50	Gamesheet

February: 10–0–2–0 (Home: 5–0–2–0; Road: 5–0–0–0)
#	Date	Visitor	Score	Home	OT	Decision	Attendance	Record	Pts	Gamesheet
45	February 4	Grand Rapids	3–1	Toronto		Gustavsson	7,851	24–17–3–1	52	Gamesheet
46	February 6	Rochester	4–5	Grand Rapids	OT	Coreau	6,454	25–17–3–1	54	Gamesheet
47	February 7	Rochester	4–3	Grand Rapids	OT	McCollum	10,834	25–17–4–1	55	Gamesheet
48	February 13	San Antonio	5–4	Grand Rapids	OT	McCollum	7,168	25–17–5–1	56	Gamesheet
49	February 14	San Antonio	2–4	Grand Rapids		Coreau	7,753	26–17–5–1	58	Gamesheet
50	February 15	Grand Rapids	5–1	Chicago		Coreau	8,784	27–17–5–1	60	Gamesheet
51	February 18	Milwaukee	3–4	Grand Rapids	OT	Coreau	4,602	28–17–5–1	62	Gamesheet
52	February 20	Hamilton	2–3	Grand Rapids	OT	Mrazek	8,388	29–17–5–1	64	Gamesheet
53	February 21	Hamilton	0–2	Grand Rapids		Mrazek	10,834	30–17–5–1	66	Gamesheet
54	February 24	Grand Rapids	6–2	Iowa		Mrazek	4,122	31–17–5–1	68	Gamesheet
55	February 27	Grand Rapids	4–0	Milwaukee		Mrazek	12,315	32–17–5–1	70	Gamesheet
56	February 28	Grand Rapids	5–0	Chicago		Mrazek	8,713	33–17–5–1	72	Gamesheet

March: 7–2–1–1 (Home: 3–1–0–0; Road: 4–1–1–1)
#	Date	Visitor	Score	Home	OT	Decision	Attendance	Record	Pts	Gamesheet
57	March 4	Oklahoma City	1–7	Grand Rapids		Mrazek	6,306	34–17–5–1	74	Gamesheet
58	March 6	Grand Rapids	2–3	Milwaukee	OT	Mrazek	5,388	34–17–6–1	75	Gamesheet
59	March 7	Grand Rapids	3–2	Rockford	OT	McCollum	6,475	35–17–6–1	77	Gamesheet
60	March 10	Grand Rapids	3–2	Charlotte		McCollum	3,917	36–17–6–1	79	Gamesheet
61	March 12	Grand Rapids	1–2	Charlotte	SO	McCollum	4,903	36–17–6–2	80	Gamesheet
62	March 14	Rockford	1–3	Grand Rapids		McCollum	10,834	37–17–6–2	82	Gamesheet
63	March 20	Milwaukee	1–3	Grand Rapids		McCollum	10,834	38–17–6–2	84	Gamesheet
64	March 21	Grand Rapids	3–4	Lake Erie		Coreau	12,532	38–18–6–2	84	Gamesheet
65	March 22	Adirondack	4–1	Grand Rapids		McCollum	9,638	38–19–6–2	84	Gamesheet
66	March 27	Grand Rapids	2–0	Texas		McCollum	5,079	39–19–6–2	86	Gamesheet
67	March 28	Grand Rapids	4–3	Texas		McCollum	6,863	40–19–6–2	88	Gamesheet

April: 6–3–0–0 (Home: 4–1–0–0; Road: 2–2–0–0)
#	Date	Visitor	Score	Home	OT	Decision	Attendance	Record	Pts	Gamesheet
68	April 1	Rockford	1–6	Grand Rapids		McCollum	8,024	41–19–6–2	90	Gamesheet
69	April 3	Grand Rapids	2–6	Rockford		McCollum	3,830	41–20–6–2	90	Gamesheet
70	April 4	Toronto	2–7	Grand Rapids		Coreau	9,360	42–20–6–2	92	Gamesheet
71	April 8	Milwaukee	2–6	Grand Rapids		McCollum	10,834	43–20–6–2	94	Gamesheet
72	April 10	Grand Rapids	0–2	San Antonio		McCollum	8,734	43–21–6–2	94	Gamesheet
73	April 11	Grand Rapids	2–1	San Antonio	OT	Coreau	7,828	44–21–6–2	96	Gamesheet
74	April 16	Grand Rapids	6–4	Lake Erie		McCollum	6,244	45–21–6–2	98	Gamesheet
75	April 17	Charlotte	1–2	Grand Rapids		Coreau	9,264	46–21–6–2	100	Gamesheet
76	April 18	Charlotte	7–3	Grand Rapids		Coreau	9,804	46–22–6–2	100	Gamesheet

Legend: Win (2 points) Loss (0 points) Overtime/shootout loss (1 point)

=== Playoffs ===
2015 Calder Cup Playoffs

Western Conference Quarterfinals vs. (7) Toronto Marlies – Grand Rapids won series 3–2
#	Date	Visitor	Score	Home	OT	Decision	Attendance	Series	Recap
1	April 25	Grand Rapids	4–7	Toronto		McCollum	7,706	0–1	Recap
2	April 26	Grand Rapids	2–5	Toronto		Coreau	7,851	0–2	Recap
3	April 29	Toronto	2–5	Grand Rapids		McCollum	6,737	1–2	Recap
4	May 2	Toronto	4–5	Grand Rapids		McCollum	6,622	2–2	Recap
5	May 3	Toronto	1–3	Grand Rapids		McCollum	4,529	3–2	Recap

Western Conference Semifinals vs. (4) Rockford IceHogs – Grand Rapids won series 4–1
#	Date	Visitor	Score	Home	OT	Decision	Attendance	Series	Recap
1	May 6	Grand Rapids	5–3	Rockford		McCollum	3,954	1–0	Recap
2	May 8	Grand Rapids	5–1	Rockford		McCollum	7,593	2–0	Recap
3	May 13	Rockford	4–1	Grand Rapids		McCollum	1,780	2–1	Recap
4	May 14	Rockford	1–2	Grand Rapids	OT	McCollum	1,620	3–1	Recap
5	May 17	Rockford	3–5	Grand Rapids		McCollum	1,624	4–1	Recap

Western Conference Finals vs. (1) Utica Comets – Utica won series 4–2
#	Date	Visitor	Score	Home	OT	Decision	Attendance	Series	Recap
1	May 24	Grand Rapids	1–2	Utica		McCollum	3,835	0–1	Recap
2	May 25	Grand Rapids	4–2	Utica		McCollum	3,835	1–1	Recap
3	May 28	Utica	4–1	Grand Rapids		McCollum	5,122	1–2	Recap
4	May 29	Utica	2–3	Grand Rapids	OT	McCollum	8,967	2–2	Recap
5	May 31	Utica	3–2	Grand Rapids		McCollum	7,415	2–3	Recap
6	June 2	Grand Rapids	0–2	Utica		McCollum	3,835	2–4	Recap

Legend: Win Loss

== Player statistics ==
=== Skaters ===
Note: GP = Games played; G = Goals; A = Assists; Pts = Points; +/− = Plus/minus; PIM = Penalty minutes

Regular season
Player	GP	G	A	Pts	+/-	PIM
Andy Miele	71	26	44	70	10	42
Teemu Pulkkinen^{‡}	46	34	27	61	1	30
Landon Ferraro^{‡}	70	27	15	42	14	61
Kevin Porter	76	16	23	39	−11	25
Mitch Callahan	48	16	22	38	3	24
Nathan Paetsch	75	8	30	38	24	42
Mark Zengerle	72	15	22	37	17	8
Tomas Nosek	55	11	23	34	30	22
Anthony Mantha^{*}	62	15	18	33	5	64
Andreas Athanasiou	55	16	16	32	17	25
Jeff Hoggan	76	14	17	31	23	39
Marek Tvrdon	51	10	19	29	17	16
Nick Jensen	75	6	21	27	20	15
Ryan Sproul	66	5	19	24	−5	26
Alexey Marchenko^{‡}	51	3	17	20	22	26
Louis-Marc Aubry	66	5	11	16	9	52
Xavier Ouellet	52	1	15	16	0	24
Martin Frk	32	6	6	12	0	16
Scott Czarnowczan	29	2	8	10	11	30
Brian Lashoff	32	1	6	7	16	12
Colin Campbell	44	2	3	5	7	29
Chris Bruton	51	2	2	4	−2	124
Brennan Evans	54	1	3	4	10	71
Mattias Backman^{‡}	18	0	4	4	−3	6
Stephen Weiss^{‡}	3	2	0	2	0	0
Alden Hirschfeld	12	1	1	2	−1	10
Tyler Bertuzzi	2	1	0	1	−2	0
Jakub Kindl^{‡}	2	1	0	1	2	2
Tyler Barnes^{‡}	2	0	0	0	0	0
Joel Chouinard^{‡}	2	0	0	0	−1	0
Jared Nightingale^{‡}	2	0	0	0	0	0
Kyle Bonis^{‡}	3	0	0	0	0	0
Shane Berschbach^{‡}	5	0	0	0	−3	0
Zach Nastasiuk	6	0	0	0	−2	0

Playoffs
Player	GP	G	A	Pts	+/-	PIM
Teemu Pulkkinen	16	14	4	18	−6	22
Andy Miele	16	3	11	14	0	20
Tyler Bertuzzi	14	7	5	12	4	10
Mark Zengerle	16	2	9	11	−2	2
Andreas Athanasiou	16	5	4	9	5	6
Jeff Hoggan	16	2	7	9	−13	26
Tomas Nosek	12	2	5	7	−10	4
Marek Tvrdon	13	2	4	6	0	2
Xavier Ouellet	16	1	5	6	6	8
Dylan Larkin	6	3	2	5	−1	6
Anthony Mantha	16	2	2	4	0	16
Kevin Porter	16	1	3	4	−4	14
Alexey Marchenko	11	0	4	4	−2	2
Nathan Paetsch	16	0	4	4	−2	2
Louis-Marc Aubry	16	3	0	3	2	16
Nick Jensen	16	0	3	3	−6	4
Brian Lashoff	16	0	3	3	−2	8
Martin Frk	2	0	2	2	−2	0
Brennan Evans	16	0	2	2	2	31
Alden Hirschfeld	6	1	0	1	1	2
Colin Campbell	7	0	1	1	1	2
Zach Nastasiuk	4	0	0	0	0	0
Ryan Sproul	5	0	0	0	−3	0

=== Goaltenders ===
Note: GP = Games played; TOI = Time on ice; W = Wins; L = Losses; GA = Goals against; GAA = Goals against average; SV = Saves; SA = Shots against; SV% = Save percentage; SO = Shutouts; G = Goals; A = Assists; PIM = Penalty minutes

Regular season
Player	GP	TOI	W	L	GA	GAA	SV	SA	SV%	SO	G	A	PIM
Pat Nagle	2	77:13	1	0	1	0.78	34	35	.971	0	0	0	0
Jonas Gustavsson	2	119:04	1	1	4	2.02	59	63	.937	0	0	0	0
Petr Mrazek	13	756:32	9	2	26	2.06	331	357	.927	3	0	0	6
Jared Coreau	25	1474:39	16	8	54	2.20	685	739	.927	3	0	1	4
Tom McCollum	37	2171:02	19	11	87	2.40	949	1036	.916	1	0	4	0
Totals		4639:15	46	22	183	2.37	2058	2241	.918	7	0	5	10

Playoffs
Player	GP	TOI	W	L	GA	GAA	SV	SA	SV%	SO	G	A	PIM
Tom McCollum	15	894:52	9	6	38	2.55	413	451	.916	0	0	0	0
Jared Coreau	1	58:02	0	1	3	3.10	21	24	.875	0	0	0	0
Totals		965:18	9	7	46	2.86	434	480	.904	0	0	0	0

^{†}Denotes player spent time with another team before joining team. Stats reflect time with the team only.
^{‡}Left the team mid-season
^{*}Rookie

== Final roster ==
Updated May 29, 2015

No.	Nat	Player	Pos	S/G	Age	Acquired	Birthplace	Contract
23	(Canada)	Andreas Athanasiou	LW	L	20	2012	Woodbridge, Ontario	Red Wings
22	(Canada)	Louis-Marc Aubry	C	L	23	2010	Arthabaska, Quebec	Red Wings
39	(Canada)	Tyler Bertuzzi	LW	L	20	2014	Sudbury, Ontario	Griffins
20	(Canada)	Kyle Bonis	LW	L	26	2014	Lindsay, Ontario	Griffins
55	(Canada)	Chris Bruton	LW	R	28	2014	Calgary, Alberta	Red Wings
15	(United States)	Mitch Callahan	RW	R	23	2011	Whittier, California	Red Wings
17	(Canada)	Colin Campbell	F	R	24	2013	Pickering, Ontario	Red Wings
31	(Canada)	Jared Coreau	G	L	24	2013	Perth, Ontario	Red Wings
2	(United States)	Scott Czarnowczan	D	L	24	2014	Macomb, Michigan	Griffins
44	(Canada)	Brennan Evans (A)	D	L	33	2012	North Battleford, Saskatchewan	Griffins
27	(Czech Republic)	Martin Frk	RW	R	21	2012	Pelhřimov, Czech Republic	Red Wings
5	(Canada)	Joe Hicketts	D	L	19	2014	Kamloops, British Columbia	Griffins
32	(United States)	Alden Hirschfeld	F	R	27	2014	Dallas, Texas	Griffins
10	(Canada)	Jeff Hoggan (C)	LW	L	37	2011	Hope, British Columbia	Griffins
14	(United States)	Nick Jensen	D	R	24	2009	Rogers, Minnesota	Red Wings
25	(United States)	Dylan Larkin	C	L	18	2014	Waterford, Michigan	Red Wings
18	(United States)	Brian Lashoff (A)	D	L	24	2010	Albany, New York	Red Wings
35	(United States)	Jeff Lerg	G	L	29	2014	Livonia, Michigan	Griffins
8	(Canada)	Anthony Mantha	RW	L	20	2013	Longueuil, Quebec	Red Wings
3	(Russia)	Alexey Marchenko	D	R	23	2011	Moscow, Russia	Red Wings
30	(United States)	Tom McCollum	G	L	25	2009	Cambria, New York	Red Wings
21	(United States)	Andy Miele	C	L	27	2014	Detroit, Michigan	Red Wings
37	(Canada)	Zach Nastasiuk	RW	R	20	2013	Barrie, Ontario	Red Wings
19	(Czech Republic)	Tomas Nosek	F	L	22	2014	Pardubice, Czechoslovakia	Red Wings
16	(Canada)	Xavier Ouellet	D	L	21	2011	Bayonne, France	Red Wings
4	(Canada)	Nathan Paetsch (A)	D	L	32	2012	Humboldt, Saskatchewan	Griffins
1	(Canada)	Jake Paterson	G	L	21	2013	Mississauga, Ontario	Red Wings
12	(United States)	Kevin Porter	C	L	29	2014	Detroit, Michigan	Red Wings
6	(Finland)	Teemu Pulkkinen	RW	R	23	2013	Vantaa, Finland	Red Wings
7	(Canada)	Ryan Sproul	D	R	22	2011	Mississauga, Ontario	Red Wings
13	(Slovakia)	Marek Tvrdon	LW	L	22	2011	Nitra, Slovakia	Red Wings
9	(United States)	Mark Zengerle	C	R	26	2014	Rochester, New York	Griffins
