= Hoyt Shoe Factory =

- U.S. National Register of Historic Places
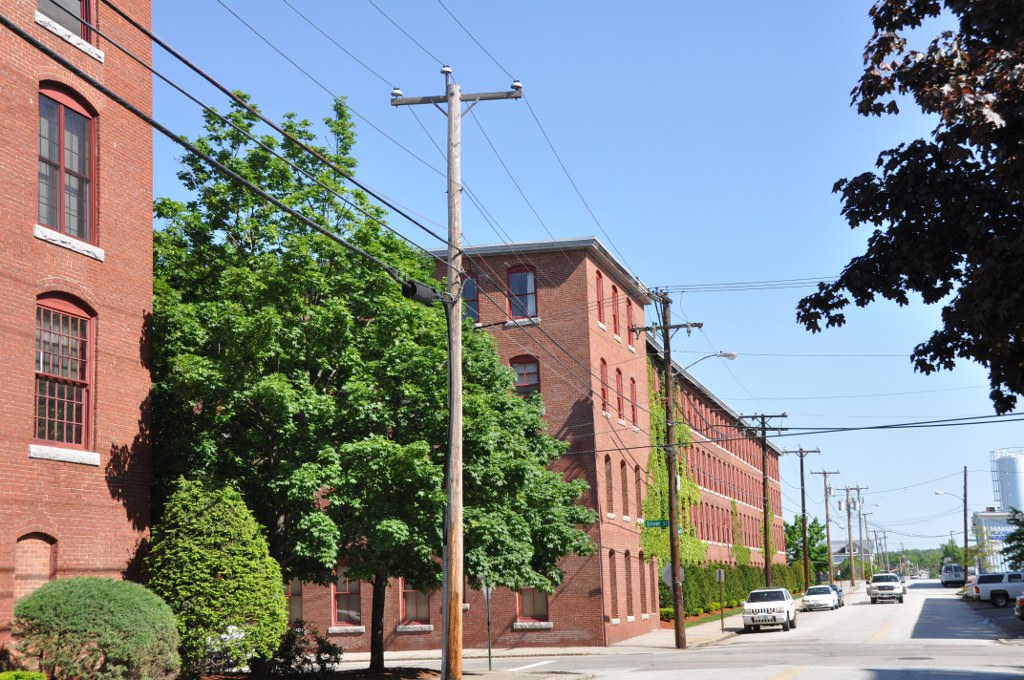

- Location within New Hampshire Location within the United States
- Location: 470 Silver and 170 Lincoln Sts., Manchester, New Hampshire
- Coordinates: 42°58′38″N 71°27′5″W
- Area: 3 acres (1.2 ha)
- Built: 1892
- Architect: Stevens, A.G.
- NRHP reference No.: 85002777
- Added to NRHP: November 7, 1985

The Hoyt Shoe Factory is a historic factory complex at 470 Silver Street and 170 Lincoln Street in Manchester, New Hampshire. It consists of two once-identical four-story brick factory buildings which face each other across Silver Street. Built in the 1890s, they housed the city's largest shoe manufacturer, an industry that gained in significance as its textile industry declined. The complex was listed on the National Register of Historic Places in 1985.

== Description and history ==
The former Hoyt Shoe Factory complex is located about 1.5 miles (2.4 km) southeast of downtown Manchester, on either side of Silver Street at its junction with Lincoln Street. Both are four stories in height, built out of brick. They are typical of Manchester's mill construction, with segmented-arch windows in a parade of bays on the long side. The northern building has large ells extending to its north, giving it a modified U shape, while the southern one has two smaller additions. A third building built for Hoyt stands further west, but is not included in the National Register listing because alterations made to it have compromised its historic integrity.

One of the two buildings was built in 1892, the other in 1895, and both have had additions made to them in the early 20th century. They were designed by industrial architect Augustus G. Stevens for Francis M. Hoyt, and, along with other nearby buildings, were the city's largest shoe manufactory. Located outside the city's main mill district, which was operated by the Amoskeag Manufacturing Company, shoe production gained in economic importance as the textile industry declined, and the Hoyt Company operated here until 1971. Much of the space was taken over by other manufacturing concerns after the 1930s.

== See also ==
- Kimball Brothers Shoe Factory: NRHP-listed shoe factory in Manchester, New Hampshire
- Landis Shoe Company Building: NRHP-listed shoe factory in Palmyra, Pennsylvania
- National Register of Historic Places listings in Hillsborough County, New Hampshire
