= Kimball Brothers Shoe Factory =

- U.S. National Register of Historic Places
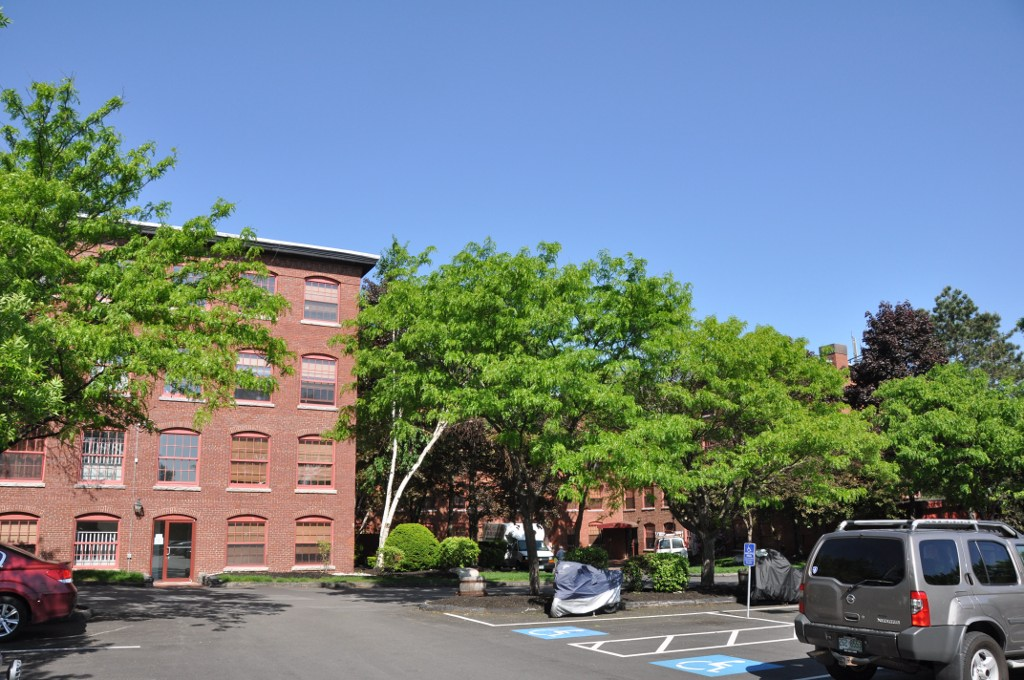

- Location within New Hampshire Location within the United States
- Location: 335 Cypress St., Manchester, New Hampshire
- Coordinates: 42°58′55″N 71°26′22″W
- Area: 1.8 acres (0.73 ha)
- Built: 1885
- Built by: Head & Dowst
- NRHP reference No.: 85002776
- Added to NRHP: November 7, 1985

The Kimball Brothers Shoe Factory is a historic factory building at 335 Cypress Street in Manchester, New Hampshire. The four-story brick building was built in stages between 1885 and 1900, and was a prototypical structure from which the design of other period shoe factories in Manchester were built. Construction was overseen by Head & Dowst, a builder responsible for a number of area public buildings, including schools and prisons. It was funded by local businessmen seeking to diversify the local economy, and was leased to the Kimball Brothers, a leading shoe manufacturer in Lynn, Massachusetts. The building was listed on the National Register of Historic Places in 1985.

== Description and history ==
The Kimball Brothers Shoe Factory is located about 1.5 miles (2.4 km) east of downtown Manchester, in a predominantly residential area. It occupies a parcel bounded on three sides by Cypress and Massabesic streets and Woodman Avenue. It is a U-shaped four-story brick building with typical late 19th-century industrial styling. Windows are set in segmented-arch openings, and the building is crowned by a modest corbelled cornice. The building exhibits a unified style despite three different major building phases. Its interior has been converted to residential use.

The oldest portion, the Cypress Street elevation, was built in 1885, at a time when shoemaking was a cottage industry in the city, and textile mills were its major business. A consortium of local businessmen organized the Manchester Shoe Manufacturing Company in that year in a bid to diversify the city's economic base. The building was immediately leased to Kimball Manufacturing of Lynn, and was enlarged in 1890 and 1900. The Kimballs had been in business since 1878, and moved the bulk of their production to Manchester after a fire destroyed their Lynn plant in 1889. They operated on the premises until 1929, and it remained in use for shoe manufacturing until 1970. The building served as a prototype for the construction of other shoe factories in the area, including the Hoyt Shoe Factory.

== See also ==
- Hoyt Shoe Factory: NRHP-listed shoe factory in Manchester, New Hampshire
- Landis Shoe Company Building: NRHP-listed shoe factory in Palmyra, Pennsylvania
- National Register of Historic Places listings in Hillsborough County, New Hampshire
