= Johannes Palm =

American physician

Johannes Palm (1713–1799), whose name is often anglicized to John Palm, is given credit for founding Palmyra, Pennsylvania. He was a prominent figure in the early days of the community, who served his country as a doctor and soldier.

== Personal life ==
Johannes Palm was born in Heilsbronn to Matthias and Sibylla Palm on July 15, 1713. In 1739, Palm moved to Backnang, near Stuttgart. He married Christina Dorothea Kern on August 2, 1740. After a visit to Amsterdam, Palm began to study medicine in Württemberg. He was most likely aided by relatives, as many physicians and druggists in Württemberg at that time held the Palm family name. Palm left Germany, and arrived in Philadelphia in 1749. He first settled in Northern New Jersey, near Elizabeth. After the death of his wife, he married Catharine Salome Fenger around 1754. He would outlive her as well.

On June 17, 1766, Palm secured his 100-acre (0.40 km^{2}) plot from Conrad Raisch. Palm was the third owner of the tract since it was surveyed for Johannes Deininger in 1751. This tract can be located today using Railroad St. as the eastern border, Maple St. as the southern border, and the Dauphin County Line as the western border. His house would be in the center of the 100 block on W. Main St.

By the time the American Revolution broke out in 1775, Palm was 62. Although he felt was too old to take an active part in the revolution, he did participate in the Battle of Brandywine on September 11, 1777. He would later recall how George Washington would encourage his men in battle. Sixteen days after he served at Brandywine, Palm took the Oath of Allegiance and Fidelity before Justice of the Peace John Thomas. Ten other soldiers from the Palmyra area also served in the American Revolution. Their names are recorded and their graves are marked in Bindnagles Cemetery.

Palm had an extensive medical practice. Since the region was still sparsely populated, many of his patients traveled great distances to receive his attention. He had a sophisticated laboratory where he prepared most of his medicines. He distilled his own essential oils and waters from herbs, flowers and other plants. His medical books were mostly from German authors. Palm was baptized and confirmed into the Lutheran Church.

== Death ==
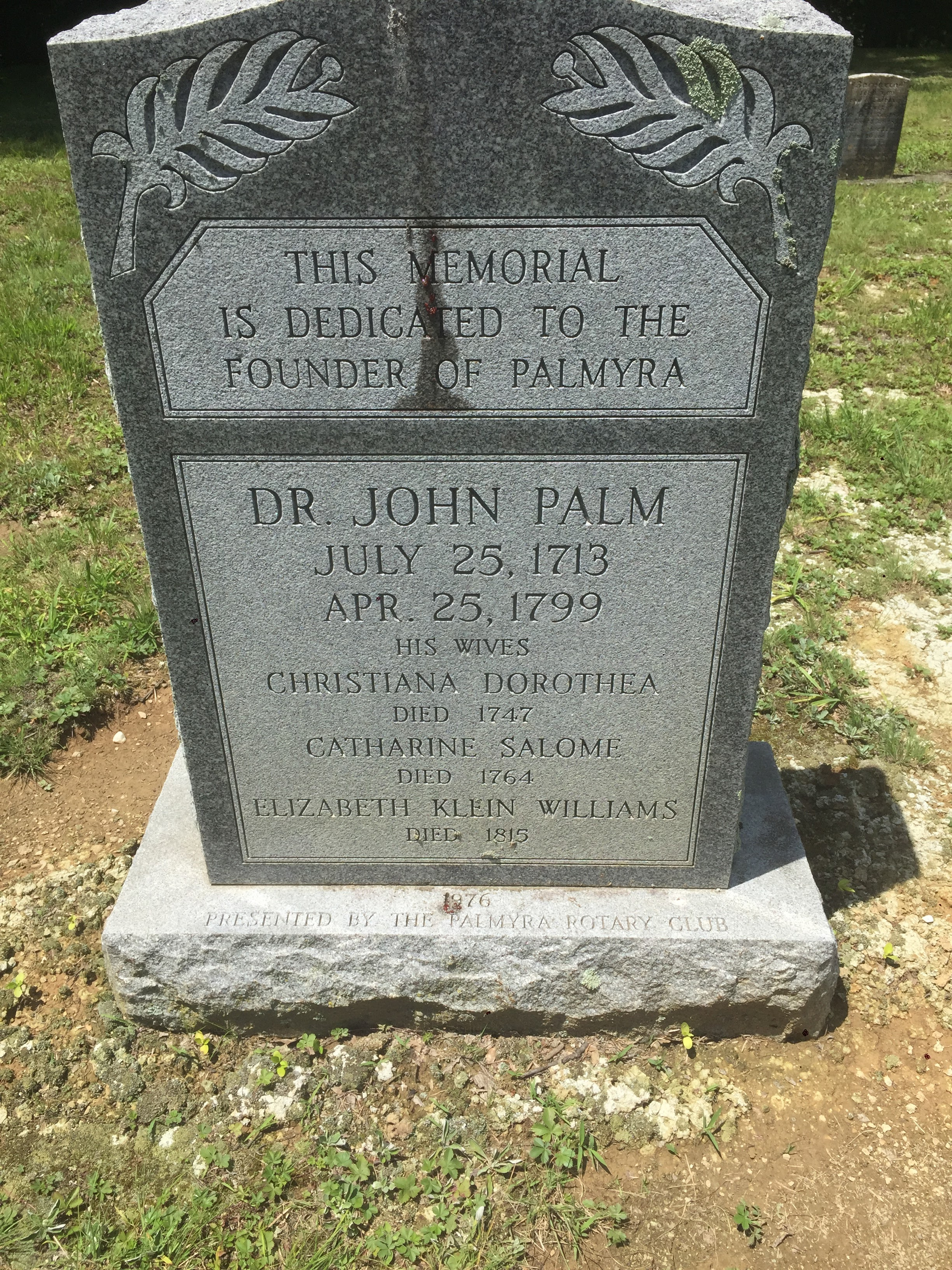
John Palm's Grave Marker

Johannes Palm died on April 25, 1799, in Palmyra, at the age of 85. He had practiced medicine in North America for nearly 50 years.

On July 24, 1932, American Legion Post No. 72, with the assistance of S. M. Aument of Montoursville, a great-great-great-great granddaughter of Johannes Palm, unveiled a new marker at Palm’s grave at Bindnagle Cemetery, located at Bindnagle Lutheran Church, 801 Gravel Hill Road. On November 20 of that same year, the John Palm Memorial was erected on a small triangle of land on Railroad St. On hand was Dr. Howard Palm of Camden, who was also a direct descendant of Johannes Palm.
