= Palmyra, Pennsylvania =

Borough in Pennsylvania, US

Palmyra, Pennsylvania Pallemschteddel
- Borough
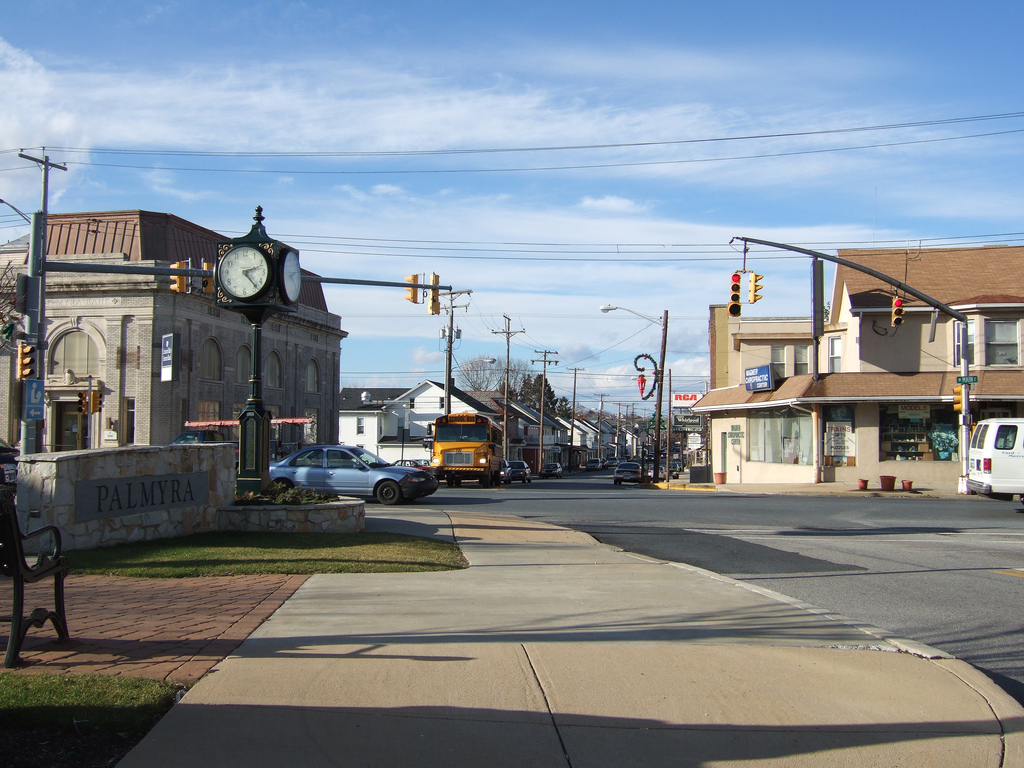
- Downtown Palmyra

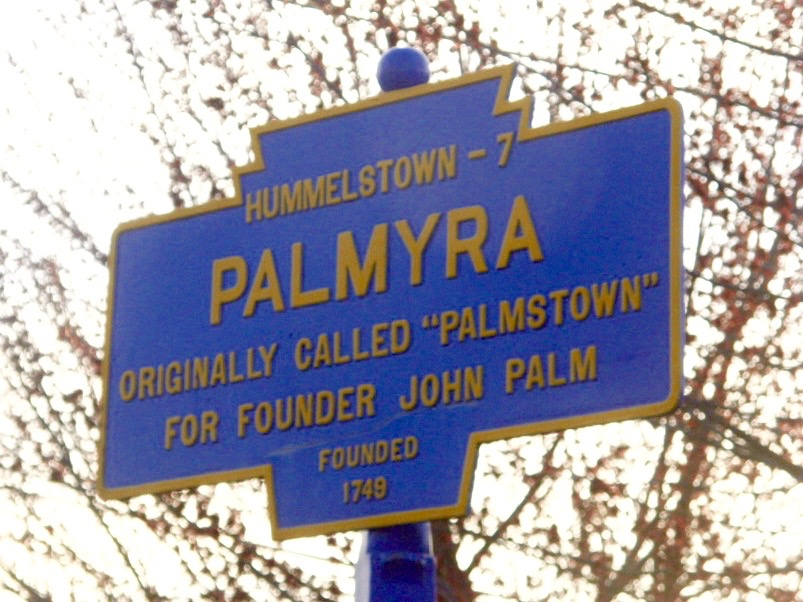
- Keystone Marker

- Location in Lebanon County, Pennsylvania

- Location in Pennsylvania Location in the United States
- Coordinates: 40°18′29″N 76°35′38″W
- Country: United States
- State: Pennsylvania
- County: Lebanon
- Settled: 1717
- Incorporated (borough): 1913

Area
  - Total: 1.93 sq mi (4.99 km^{2})
  - Land: 1.92 sq mi (4.98 km^{2})
  - Water: 0.0039 sq mi (0.01 km^{2})
- Elevation: 456 ft (139 m)

Population (2020)
  - Total: 7,830
  - Density: 4,072.3/sq mi (1,572.31/km^{2})
- Time zone: UTC-5 (Eastern (EST))
  - Summer (DST): UTC-4 (EDT)
- ZIP code: 17078
- Area codes: 717 and 223
- FIPS code: 42-57720
- Website: www.palmyraborough.org

Palmyra (Pennsylvania German: Pallemschteddel) is a borough in Lebanon County, Pennsylvania, United States. It is part of the Lebanon, Pennsylvania Metropolitan Statistical Area. The population was 7,807 at the 2020 census.

== Geography ==
Palmyra is located at 40°18′29″N 76°35′38″W (40.307960, -76.593782).

According to the United States Census Bureau, the borough has a total area of 1.9 square miles (4.9 km^{2}), all of it land.

Palmyra is located in the Lebanon Valley between Annville and Hershey. Situated on the western edge of Lebanon County, the borough is 10 mi (16 km) west of Lebanon, and 17 mi (27 km) east of Harrisburg. The village of Campbelltown is 2 mi (3.2 km) south of Palmyra and carries a Palmyra mailing address.

Although no water source runs directly through the borough, the Killinger, Quittapahilla, Spring, and Swatara Creeks are all nearby.

Palmyra has a humid continental climate.

== Geology ==
Geologist William E. Kochanov wrote an extensive report on the geology of the Palmyra area as part of the 1995 publication, Karst Geohazards. In his article, Kochanov discusses how the geology of the region contributes to the high number of sinkholes found in the area.

Palmyra lies in the eastern section of the Great Valley, locally known as the Lebanon Valley. The specific formation beneath Palmyra is an Ordovician Epler Formation, characterized by a high number of surface depressions and sinkholes. These features serve as natural drains, allowing any water on the surface to permeate the soil and run underground into water tables or into local springs or creeks.

The development of the borough has interrupted the natural drainage systems present in the Epler Formation. Palmyra is, in reality, a waterless community. All of the natural drainage ways, including the Killinger, Quittapahilla, Spring and Swatara Creeks, lie outside the borough's municipal borders. The storm water runoff is directed outside the borough via a multitude of ways, and it is these discharge areas in which the appearance of sinkholes is most prevalent. Residents and legislators met in October 1993 to discuss possible solutions to the recurring sinkhole problems. The installation of a storm sewer system was widely supported, but the estimated $10 million cost was a major hurdle. Since the meeting, several projects have been introduced to correct some of the water flow problems of the borough.

== History ==
=== Early settlement ===
The land on which Palmyra rests was originally home to the Lenape and Susquehannock tribes. The first European explorers and traders came to the region around 1650. Settlers were drawn to the area because of its rich land and abundance of fish and game. Additionally, being part of William Penn’s colony, his charter providing civil rights and religious freedom also attracted settlers to the area.

In the beginning of its colonization, many of Pennsylvania’s settlers occupied the land not through acquiring the legal rights, but by building on any unclaimed land they found, or squatting. The squatters came to the Palmyra area between 1717 and 1740. Because the squatters had no official documents stating when they came to the land, it is difficult to precisely trace family migrations to and from the area. From looking at what records do exist, and by the people still living in the Palmyra area, it is clear that the first settlers to live near Palmyra came from two distinct nationalities, the Scotch-Irish and the German Palatinates.

The Scotch-Irish immigrants left their homelands due to a number of political, economic and religious reasons. As expected, they were clannish, and tended not to mix with the other ethnic groups settling the area at the same time. They were also politically minded, and became involved in local governments quickly after settling in the area. A majority of the Scotch-Irish were Presbyterian, and they established several churches as they moved westward across the state. Examples of the churches they built include Derry near Hershey, Donegal in Lancaster County, Paxtang near Harrisburg, and Silver Spring near Carlisle. As the years passed, many of the Scotch-Irish continued westward, leaving the Lebanon Valley.

Of the first Scotch-Irish settlers in the Palmyra area, the surnames of Aspey, Campbell, Caruthers, Ewing, Galbraith, McCallen, McClure, McCord, Mitchell, Sawyer, Walker and Wilson are recorded.

Grouped with the so-called Pennsylvania Dutch (for having originated in the historically disjunct German-/"Dutch"-speaking sphere), the German Palatinates had similarly left their homelands, and for a number of reasons. Politically they had been oppressed in the old country, and economically they were poor. They were also gravely persecuted for their religious beliefs. Like the Scotch-Irish, the Germans kept to themselves and did not interfere with settlers of other backgrounds. Throughout the parts of Pennsylvania that had already been settled, German was the prominently spoken language, surpassing English. This encouraged more German settlers to lay down roots in Pennsylvania more so than in the other colonies. Most of the German settlers were farmers, and they flourished in rural areas. These Germans saw farming as a way of life, and tended to be conservative, religious, frugal and hard working people. Unlike the Scotch-Irish, the Germans were not politically minded, and they had no qualms with the English governing them. A majority of the Germans did not leave Pennsylvania, but stayed to work the rich soil.

Of the first German settlers in the Palmyra area, the surnames of Bindnagle, Bowman, Carmany, Deininger, Early, Forney, Gingrich, Hemperly, Hetrick, Kettering, Killinger, Naftzger, Nye, Ober, Ricker, and Zimmerman are recorded.

The Palmyra area, as well as the entire western edge of the European colonies, was susceptible to attack from the tribes of natives living in the region. In their histories of Lebanon County, Rupp and Egle note many raids that took place in what is now northern Lebanon County. In 1756, the Provincial government decided to build a chain of forts stretching from the Susquehanna River at Harrisburg in the west to the Delaware River at Easton in the east. These forts were built at regular intervals, roughly ten to fifteen miles (24 km) apart, and in any major gaps along the mountains. One of these forts, Fort Swatara, was built by Capt. Frederick Smith near modern-day Inwood where the Swatara Creek flows through the Blue Mountain. By the end of the French and Indian War in 1763, the frequency and intensity of native attacks diminished.

Johannes Palm, whose name is often anglicized to John Palm, is given credit for founding Palmyra. He was a prominent figure in the early days of the community, serving as a doctor and soldier in the Revolutionary War. In June 1766, Palm secured the 100-acre plot of land originally surveyed for Johannes Deininger in 1751 and previously owned by Conrad Raisch. This plot was roughly bounded by the present-day Railroad Street, Maple Street and the Dauphin County line. By 1776, Palm had drawn up drafts for a settlement he called “Palmstown”, with his residence located on the 100-Block of West Main Street.

=== Growth of Palmstown ===
The settlement's Post Office was established on April 1, 1804. The name of the town submitted to the Postal Service was “Palmstown”, in honor of Johannes Palm. Yet in 1806, there are records of a tract of land located on both sides of Main Street purchased by John Kean with the settlement being referred to as “Palmyra”, most likely referencing the Roman outpost of Palmyra in Syria. Although both names were used for a time, the popularity of “Palmyra” had spread and became the official name of the settlement by 1810.

Transportation from one settlement to the next was essential if either settlement wanted to grow. Turnpike companies were chartered to create improved roads to better facilitate the movement of goods from town to town. Governor Thomas McKean authorized the formation of the Berks and Dauphin Turnpike in 1805. This route was to connect Reading and Hummelstown and employed the main east-west thoroughfare through Palmyra. Upon its opening in 1817, Palmyra gained a direct connection to its neighbors Millerstown (now Annville) and Derry (now Hershey), and to the larger markets in eastern Pennsylvania. The Berks and Dauphin Turnpike existed as a toll road until 1917 and now forms part of US 422.

The Downingtown, Ephrata and Harrisburg Pike, which was commonly known as the Horseshoe Pike, was chartered in 1803 and completed 1819. This ran through Campbelltown just south of Palmyra and later became part of US 322. Another important route that crossed the Palmyra area included the road which led from the Bindnagle settlement to Campbelltown, which is now PA 117.

With the opening of these routes, and the incorporation of Harrisburg as the State Capital in 1812, more and more traffic moved through the Palmyra area. The passage of more travelers encouraged taverns and hotels to be built in Palmyra to accommodate them. In the first decades of the 19th century, Palmyra had five taverns and three hotels to serve the needs of those moving through the area. Blacksmith shops, general stores and other small business also began to pop up in Palmyra to serve both travelers and locals alike.

The demand of greater speed and tonnage of goods being moved prompted the building of the Union Canal. Completed in 1827, the Union Canal connected the Schuylkill River at Reading to the Susquehanna River at Middletown. The canal passed just north of Palmyra, and the settlement's citizens benefited from the increased traffic. The canal was later widened to allow larger boats to pass through in 1849. The Age of Steam also came to Palmyra in 1857, as the first locomotives ran through the settlement on the Lebanon Valley Railroad in that year. The Philadelphia and Reading Railroad, a predecessor of the Reading Company, acquired the Lebanon Valley Railroad in 1858. The growth of rail traffic signaled the end for the Union Canal, and for the Berks and Dauphin Turnpike as a toll road.

=== Since the Civil War ===
Palmyra continued to grow steadily through the 19th and 20th centuries. By 1845, the settlement consisted of 160 people in about 20 dwellings. By 1875, the population had increased to 500 people in about 100 dwellings. By 1890, the population had skyrocketed in just fifteen years to 1,760 people. And by 1960, the population had reached 7,000.

With the fall of Fort Sumter in 1861 to the Confederate Army, President Abraham Lincoln called on volunteers to preserve the Union. About 78 men from the Palmyra area answered the President's call, and donned the blue uniforms of the Union. After the Civil War concluded in 1865, a variety of new businesses were established to better serve the Palmyra area. A large grain warehouse, a slaughterhouse and lumber mill were some of the first industries developed in Palmyra. The town's first newspaper was printed in 1878 and was titled “The Londonderry Gazette”. The Palmyra Bank opened in 1887. The first of several shoe factories opened in 1888. A knitting mill, paper box factory, gas and fuel company, bakery, bottling works, and a feed mill was also open in Palmyra around the start of the 20th century. The growth of Milton S. Hershey’s chocolate company in nearby Derry also encouraged people to move to the Palmyra area. In 1899, the Lebanon Valley Street Railway Company was formed to provide transit across the length of Lebanon County. The trolley line reached Palmyra in 1904. By this time, the Hershey Trolley Company had also formed, and soon thereafter connected to the Lebanon Valley Line at the square in Palmyra. This trolley connection lasted until 1933, when the Lebanon Valley system switched to bus services. By 1946, the Hershey Line also folded.

The Landis Shoe Company Building was added to the National Register of Historic Places in 1980.

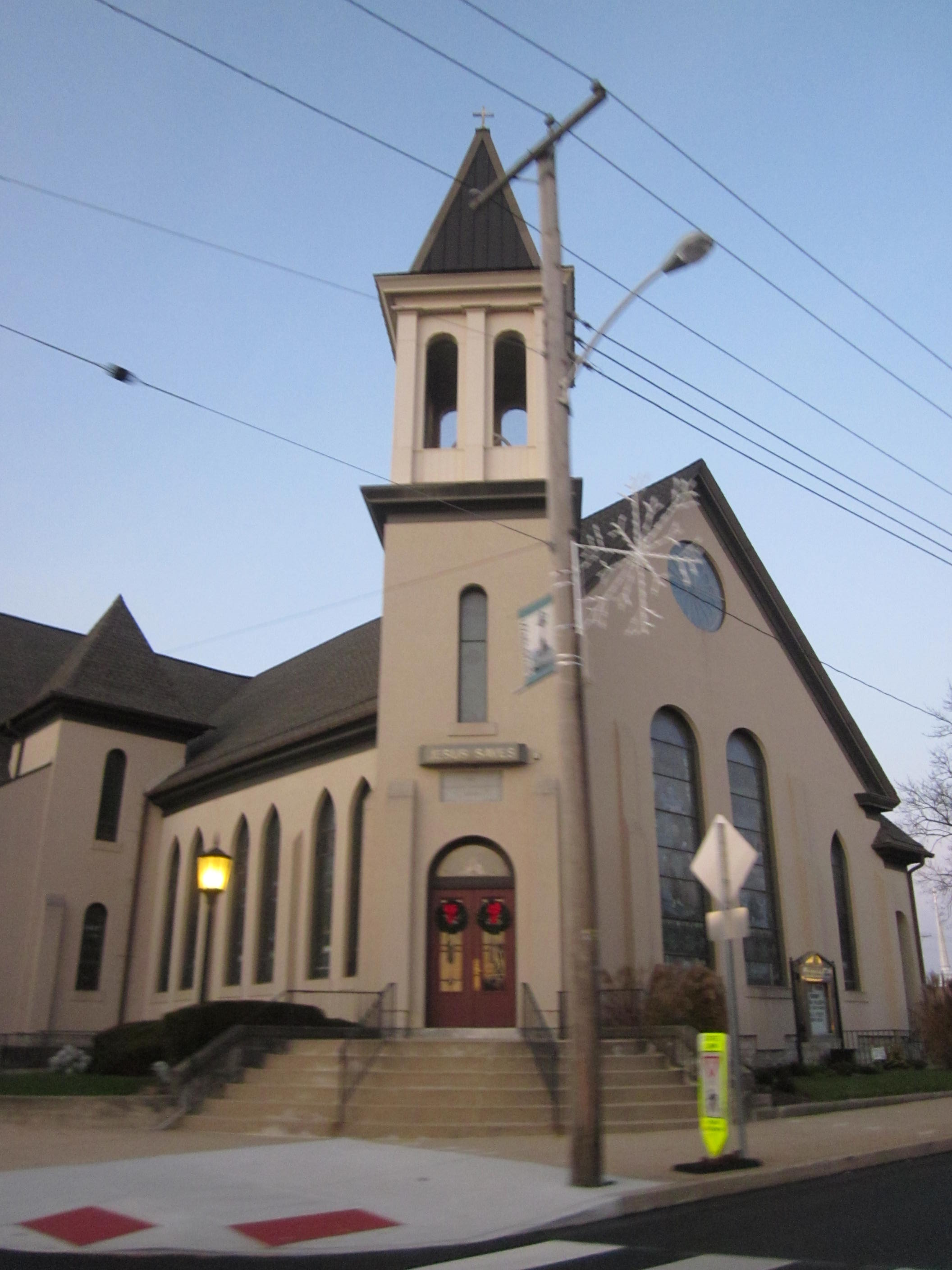
First Evangelical Church, 55 W. Main

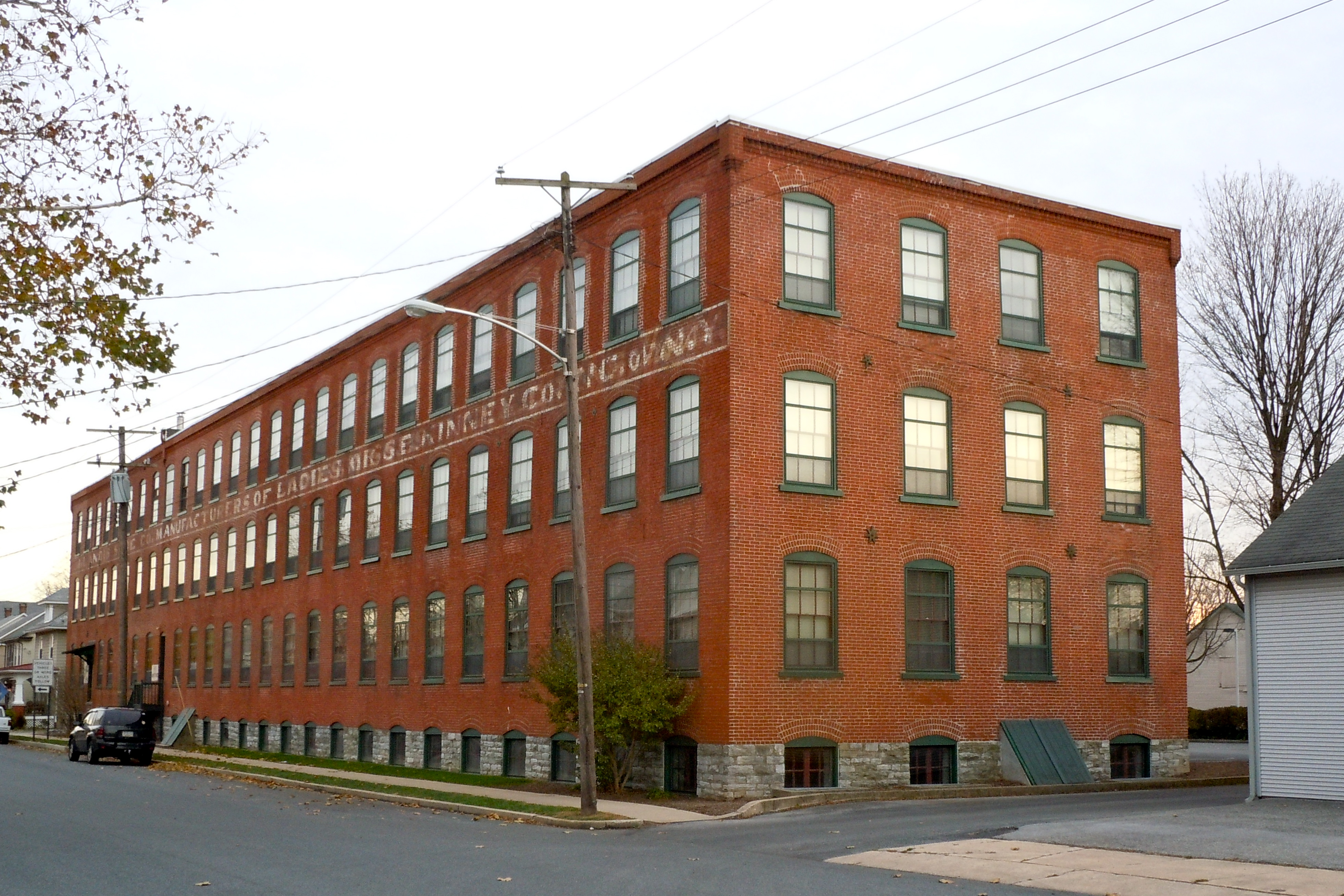
Landis Shoe Company Building

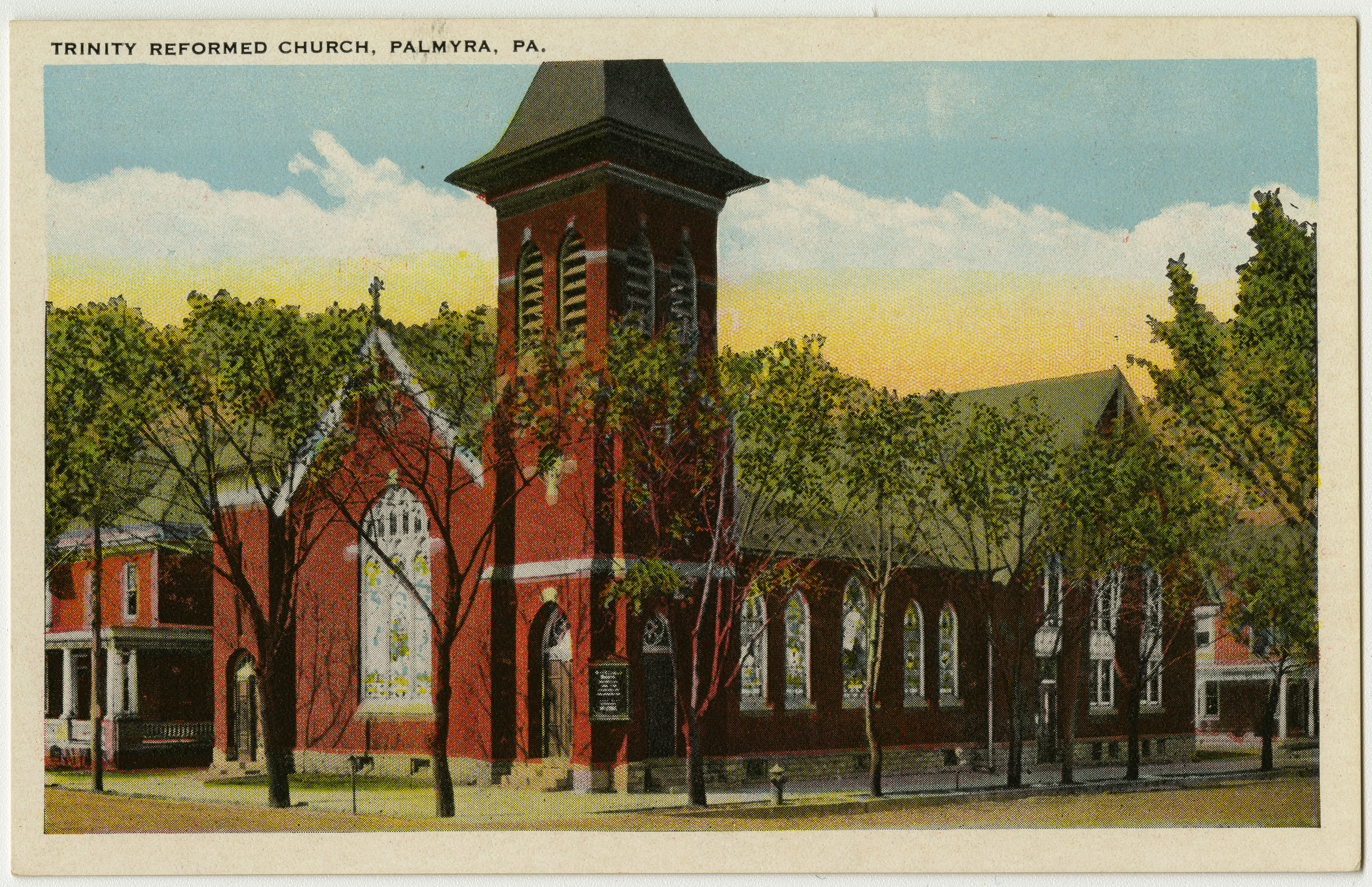
Trinity Reformed Church, now Unity of Palmyra Church, 50 W. Main

=== 250th anniversary ===
Palmyra celebrated its 250th anniversary in 2010. A committee was formed to plan the commemoration and among other duties, selected the official logo for the anniversary. The design, which is modeled on the Pennsylvania state seal and features the official orange and black colors of the Palmyra School District. Visit the official anniversary website to view an image of the winning logo.

== Culture ==
=== In popular culture ===
The 2000 film Lucky Numbers, starring John Travolta and Lisa Kudrow, had multiple scenes shot throughout Palmyra. The main street of town was closed to traffic so that scenes could be shot. Dozens of onlookers watched Kudrow and Travolta cruise through the square in a red convertible.

== Demographics ==
Historical population
Census	Pop.	Note	%±
1880	531		—
1890	768		44.6%
1920	3,646		—
1930	4,377		20.0%
1940	5,239		19.7%
1950	5,910		12.8%
1960	6,999		18.4%
1970	7,615		8.8%
1980	7,228		−5.1%
1990	6,910		−4.4%
2000	7,096		2.7%
2010	7,320		3.2%
2020	7,830		7.0%
2021 (est.)	7,755	▼	−1.0%

As of the census of 2000, there were 7,096 people, 3,200 households, and 1,952 families residing in the borough. The population density was 3,814.3 inhabitants per square mile (1,472.7/km^{2}). There were 3,363 housing units at an average density of 1,807.7 per square mile (698.0/km^{2}). The racial makeup of the borough was 96.72% White, 0.90% African American, 0.11% Native American, 0.92% Asian, 0.01% Pacific Islander, 0.34% from other races, and 1.00% from two or more races. Hispanic or Latino of any race were 1.20% of the population.

There were 3,200 households, out of which 25.9% had children under the age of 18 living with them, 47.7% were married couples living together, 10.2% had a female householder with no husband present, and 39.0% were non-families. 34.3% of all households were made up of individuals, and 14.4% had someone living alone who was 65 years of age or older. The average household size was 2.20 and the average family size was 2.83.

In the borough the population was spread out, with 22.2% under the age of 18, 8.0% from 18 to 24, 30.4% from 25 to 44, 21.4% from 45 to 64, and 18.0% who were 65 years of age or older. The median age was 38 years. For every 100 females there were 88.3 males. For every 100 females age 18 and over, there were 82.8 males.

The median income for a household in the borough was $39,677, and the median income for a family was $49,091. Males had a median income of $35,140 versus $25,524 for females. The per capita income for the borough was $20,500. About 3.9% of families and 5.3% of the population were below the poverty line, including 5.2% of those under age 18 and 6.4% of those age 65 or over.

== Education ==
The first two free public schools opened in Palmyra in 1840. Before this time, church schools and private schools served the children of Palmyra. In addition to the public schools, the Palmyra Academy, also known as the Witmer Academy after its founder, Peter B. Witmer, opened in 1857. The Palmyra Academy was praised as one of the best schools of its kind in the area. It prepared its students for continued education at colleges and universities, and educated students from all around the Susquehanna Valley and neighboring states. The Palmyra Academy closed its doors in 1890, and the Academy Building was torn down nine years later.

Coming with the growth of the area and the formation of a Borough Government, the Palmyra Borough School District was created in 1913. The first building for the district was erected on South Railroad St. on October 12, 1915. A new secondary school serving grades seven through twelve was built on W. Cherry St. in 1937. In 1952, the directors of the Borough of Palmyra and North Londonderry Township agreed to operate their schools cooperatively, and three years later merged to create the Palmyra Area School District. In 1962, the schools of South Londonderry Township joined the Palmyra Area School District.

Since its formation the district has served the Borough of Palmyra, and both North and South Londonderry Townships, including the villages of Campbelltown, Lawn, and Timber Hills. The Palmyra Area School District currently operates four elementary schools (Forge Road, Pine Street, Northside and Lingle Avenue), one middle school and one high school. All school buildings are located within the Borough of Palmyra, with the exceptions of the high school and Lingle Avenue Elementary, which are just south of the borough limits in North Londonderry Township.

== Notable people ==
- Mauree Gingrich (born 1946) – Pennsylvania state politician
- Aaron S. Kreider (1863–1929) – representative for Pennsylvania
- Johannes Palm (1713–1799) – credited as the founder of Palmyra
- Bryce Remsburg (born 1982) – professional wrestler and referee
- H. Jack Seltzer (1922–2011) – Pennsylvania state politician
- Les Walters (born 1937) – National Football League (NFL) player
- Kramer Williamson (1950–2013) – sprint car racer and National Sprint Car Hall of Fame & Museum inductee
- Richard Winters (1918–2011) – United States Army major and Distinguished Service Cross recipient
- Brendan Woods (born 1992) – National Hockey League (NHL) player
