= Brendan Woods =

American ice hockey player (born 1992)

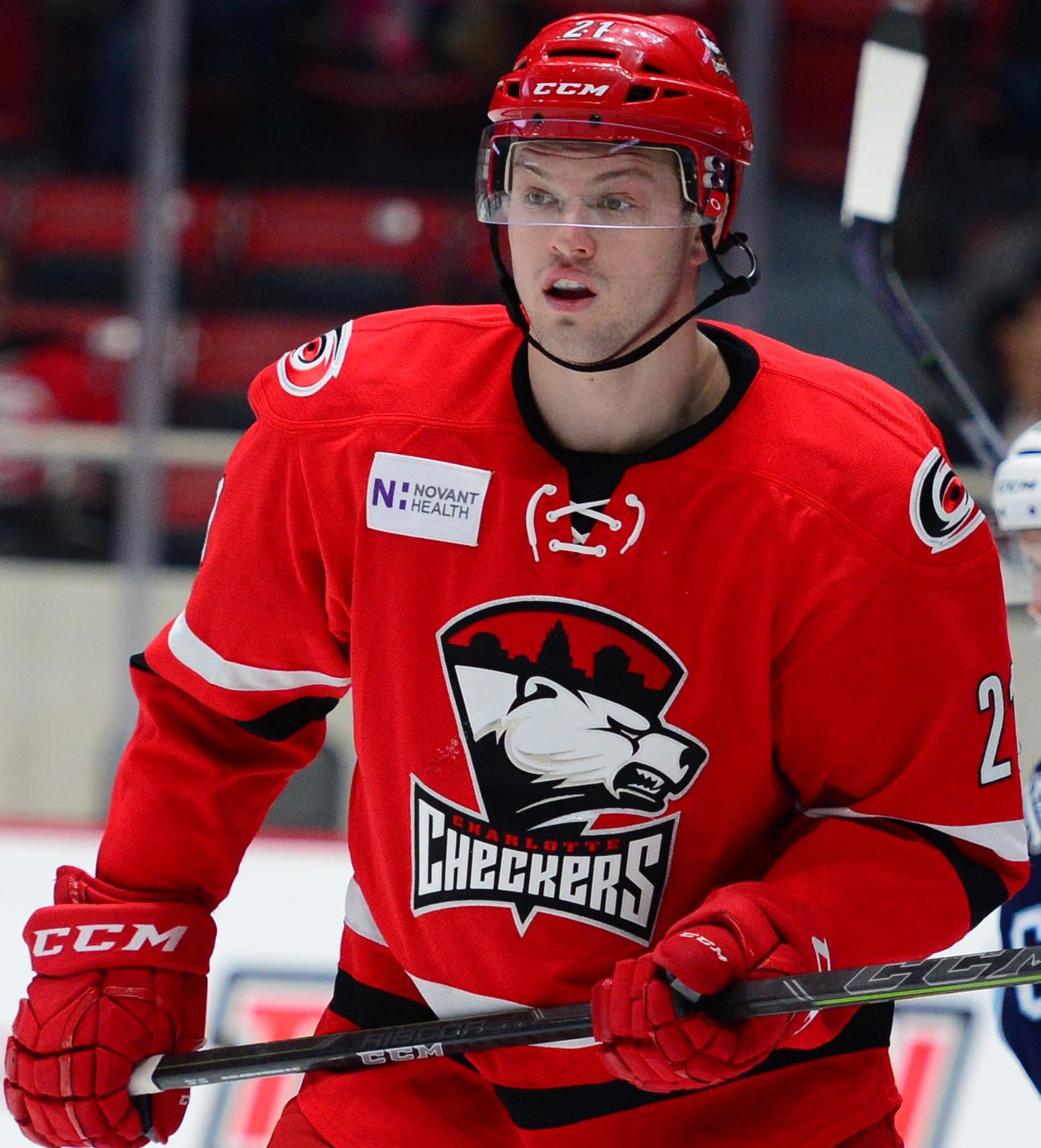
- Woods with the Charlotte Checkers in 2015
- Born: June 11, 1992 (age 34) Palmyra, Pennsylvania, U.S.
- Height: 6 ft 4 in (193 cm)
- Weight: 201 lb (91 kg; 14 st 5 lb)
- Position: Left wing
- Shot: Left
- Played for: Carolina Hurricanes
- NHL draft: 129th overall, 2012; Carolina Hurricanes
- Playing career: 2013–2020

Brendan Woods (born June 11, 1992) is an American former professional ice hockey forward. He played in the National Hockey League (NHL) with the Carolina Hurricanes. He is the son of former professional player and ECHL Hall of Famer Bob Woods.

== Playing career ==
Woods was selected in the 5th round (129th overall) in the 2012 NHL entry draft by the Carolina Hurricanes after his freshman collegiate season with the University of Wisconsin in the Western Collegiate Hockey Association conference.

On April 10, 2013, Woods was signed to a three-year entry-level contract with the Hurricanes. He then began his professional career in the tail end of the 2012–13 season with the Hurricanes AHL affiliate, the Charlotte Checkers.

In the 2014–15 season, his second full professional season, Woods was recalled by the Hurricanes and made his NHL debut, becoming the first player to appear in the NHL from a junior USHL team the Muskegon Lumberjacks, in a 2–1 shootout victory against the New Jersey Devils on December 23, 2014.

As a free agent from the Hurricanes after 5 seasons within the organization, Woods went un-signed over the summer. On September 13, 2017, he accepted an invitation on a professional tryout contract to attend the training camp of the Ottawa Senators. He was later released by the Senators in the midst of the pre-season for the 2017–18 season. On October 11, 2017, he agreed to start the season with the Utica Comets of the AHL, signing a professional tryout contract with the affiliate of the Vancouver Canucks.

After two seasons with the Utica Comets, Woods left as a free agent to sign a two-year AHL contract with the Providence Bruins on July 8, 2019.

== Career statistics ==
			Regular season					Playoffs
Season	Team	League	GP	G	A	Pts	PIM	GP	G	A	Pts	PIM
2008–09	Williston Northampton School	USHS	29	8	11	19	28	—	—	—	—	—
2009–10	London Nationals	GOJHL	2	0	0	0	10	—	—	—	—	—
2009–10	Chicago Steel	USHL	34	6	3	9	32	—	—	—	—	—
2010–11	Muskegon Lumberjacks	USHL	57	14	12	26	86	6	1	1	2	14
2011–12	University of Wisconsin	WCHA	34	5	5	10	67	—	—	—	—	—
2012–13	University of Wisconsin	WCHA	41	5	7	12	47	—	—	—	—	—
2012–13	Charlotte Checkers	AHL	2	0	0	0	2	—	—	—	—	—
2013–14	Charlotte Checkers	AHL	42	5	3	8	40	—	—	—	—	—
2014–15	Charlotte Checkers	AHL	68	13	17	30	101	—	—	—	—	—
2014–15	Carolina Hurricanes	NHL	2	0	0	0	0	—	—	—	—	—
2015–16	Charlotte Checkers	AHL	59	9	11	20	39	—	—	—	—	—
2015–16	Carolina Hurricanes	NHL	5	0	0	0	7	—	—	—	—	—
2016–17	Charlotte Checkers	AHL	24	3	3	6	41	3	1	0	1	8
2017–18	Utica Comets	AHL	14	2	2	4	30	—	—	—	—	—
2018–19	Utica Comets	AHL	53	7	10	17	103	—	—	—	—	—
2019–20	Providence Bruins	AHL	49	8	12	20	65	—	—	—	—	—
NHL totals			7	0	0	0	7	—	—	—	—	—

== Awards and honors ==
Award	Year
College
WCHA Champions	2013
