= Kyle Hagel =

Canadian ice hockey player (born 1985)

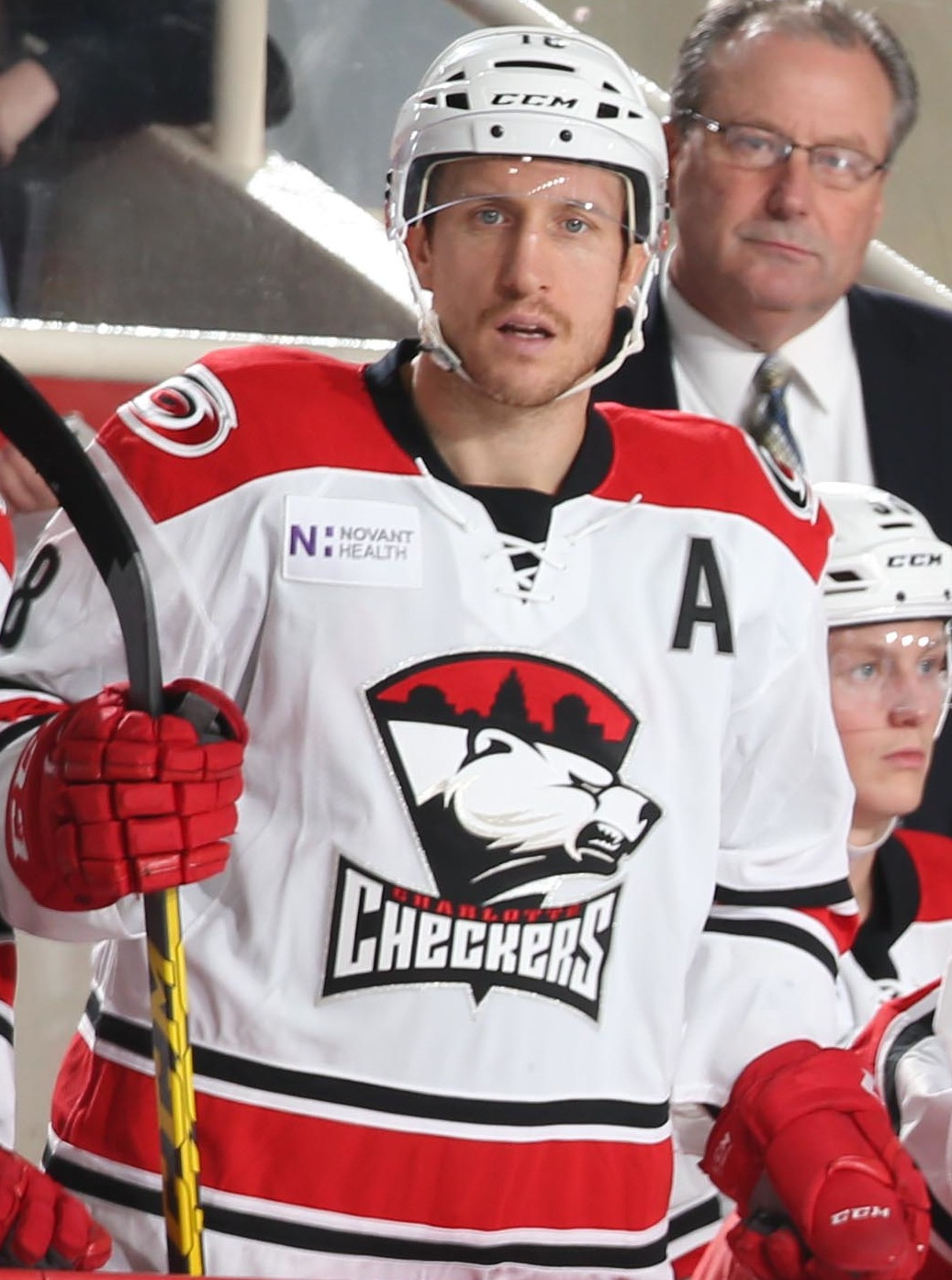
- Hagel with the Charlotte Checkers in 2015
- Born: January 21, 1985 (age 41) Hamilton, Ontario, Canada
- Height: 6 ft 0 in (183 cm)
- Weight: 209 lb (95 kg; 14 st 13 lb)
- Position: Defence
- Shot: Left
- Played for: Rochester Americans; Rockford Ice Hogs; Peoria Rivermen; Hamilton Bulldogs; Portland Pirates; Charlotte Checkers
- NHL draft: Undrafted
- Playing career: 2008–2017

Kyle Hagel (born January 21, 1985) is a Canadian ice hockey assistant coach and former professional defenseman. He played 373 games in the American Hockey League before becoming an assistant coach for the San Jose Barracuda.

== Playing career ==
Hagel played collegiate hockey with Princeton University in the ECAC conference and was undrafted. Upon completion of his senior season with the Tigers, Hagel made his professional debut in the 2008–09 season with the Fresno Falcons of the ECHL.

On May 8, 2011, the St. Louis Blues announced that they had signed Hagel as a free-agent to a one-year contract.

After only seven games with the Blues AHL affiliate, the Peoria Rivermen, due to injuries, Hagel was then signed a one-year contract to remain in the AHL with the Hamilton Bulldogs for the 2012–13 season. In 67 games with the lowly Bulldogs, Hagel scored 2 goals and 6 points whilst recording 172 penalty minutes.

On August 19, 2013, Hagel's journeyman career continued in the AHL, agreeing as a free agent to a one-year contract with the Portland Pirates. Hagel joined his sixth AHL team on July 16, 2014, agreeing to a one-year deal with the Charlotte Checkers.

Hagel added a veteran presence to the Checkers and played three seasons with the club before announcing his retirement from professional hockey on July 21, 2017. Throughout his tenure in the AHL, Hagel's efforts in the community were recognised as he was a 7-time winner of his club's Man of the Year Award. He was the recipient of the Yanick Dupre Memorial Award in 2015.

== Coaching career ==
Following his retirement, Hagel was named an assistant coach of the Seattle Thunderbirds in the Western Hockey League (WHL). Hagel left the Thunderbirds in July 2022 to become an assistant coach with the San Jose Barracuda in the AHL.

== Personal life ==
His younger brother, Marc played six games with the Lake Erie Monsters during the 2012–13 AHL season and last played for the Binghamton Senators of the AHL.

In 2013, Hagel and his friend Dustin Sproat pitched Shnarped, a social networking app for hockey players and fans, on Dragon's Den. All five Dragons pledged to invest a total of $250,000 in return for a third of their company.

== Career statistics ==
			Regular season					Playoffs
Season	Team	League	GP	G	A	Pts	PIM	GP	G	A	Pts	PIM
2002–03	Hamilton Kilty B's	OJHL	48	4	13	17	119	—	—	—	—	—
2003–04	Hamilton Red Wings	OJHL	39	4	13	17	51	—	—	—	—	—
2004–05	Princeton University	ECAC	26	0	2	2	12	—	—	—	—	—
2005–06	Princeton University	ECAC	30	6	5	11	6	—	—	—	—	—
2006–07	Princeton University	ECAC	29	4	2	6	32	—	—	—	—	—
2007–08	Princeton University	ECAC	32	2	3	5	30	—	—	—	—	—
2008–09	Fresno Falcons	ECHL	23	5	3	8	97	—	—	—	—	—
2008–09	Reading Royals	ECHL	15	2	3	5	46	—	—	—	—	—
2008–09	Rochester Americans	AHL	3	0	0	0	5	—	—	—	—	—
2009–10	Las Vegas Wranglers	ECHL	42	7	8	15	77	5	3	1	4	9
2009–10	Rockford IceHogs	AHL	9	0	0	0	36	—	—	—	—	—
2010–11	Rockford IceHogs	AHL	77	5	8	13	245	—	—	—	—	—
2011–12	Peoria Rivermen	AHL	7	0	1	1	15	—	—	—	—	—
2012–13	Hamilton Bulldogs	AHL	67	2	4	6	172	—	—	—	—	—
2013–14	Portland Pirates	AHL	38	0	5	5	162	—	—	—	—	—
2014–15	Charlotte Checkers	AHL	73	2	2	4	154	—	—	—	—	—
2015–16	Charlotte Checkers	AHL	75	5	5	10	164	—	—	—	—	—
2016–17	Charlotte Checkers	AHL	24	1	3	4	48	—	—	—	—	—
AHL totals			373	15	28	43	1001	—	—	—	—	—

== Awards and honours ==
Award	Year
AHL
Yanick Dupre Memorial Award	2015
