= Roland McKeown =

Canadian ice hockey player (born 1996)

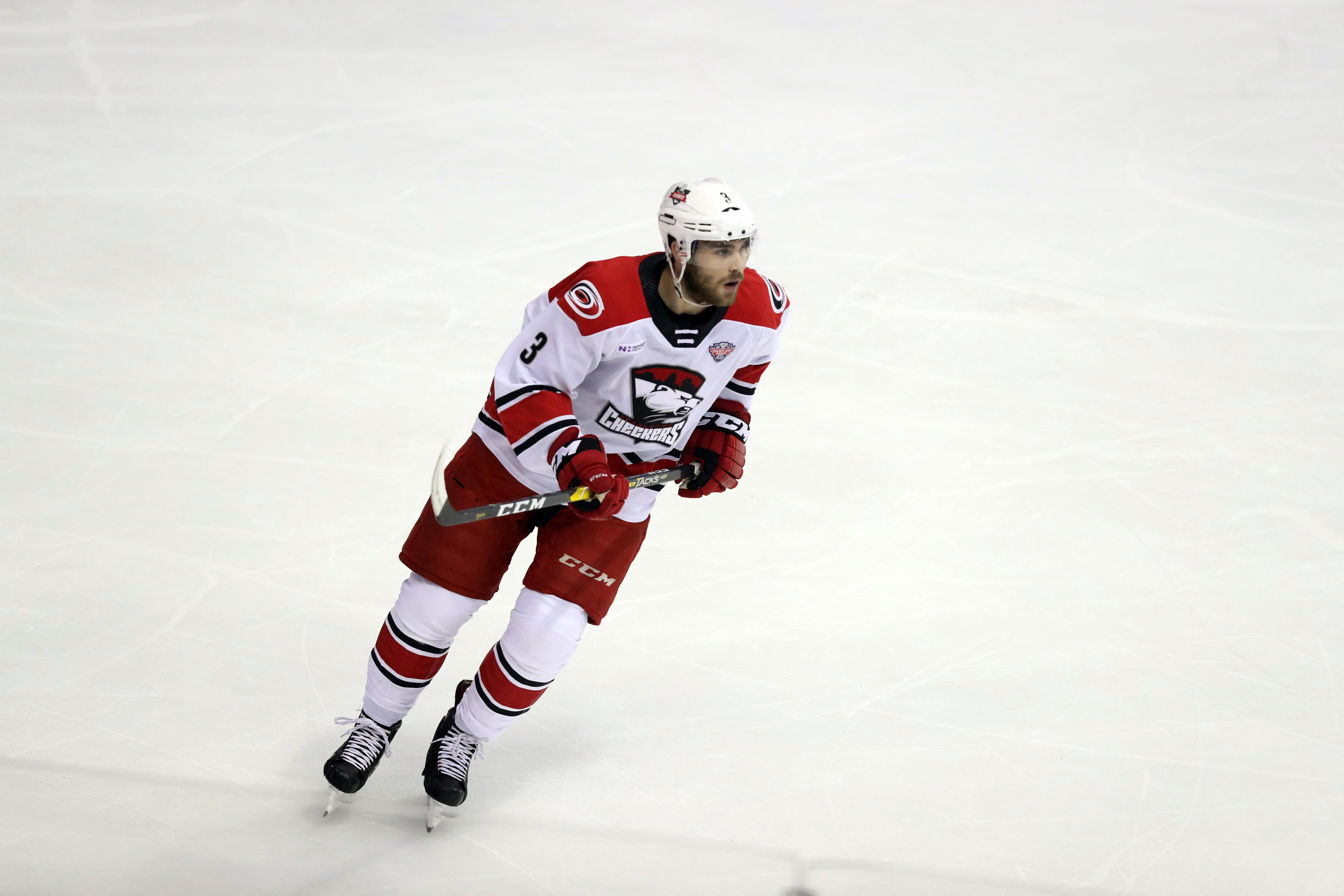
- McKeown with the Charlotte Checkers in 2019
- Born: January 20, 1996 (age 30) Listowel, Ontario
- Height: 6 ft 1 in (185 cm)
- Weight: 195 lb (88 kg; 13 st 13 lb)
- Position: Defence
- Shoots: Right
- AHL team Former teams: San Jose Barracuda; Carolina Hurricanes; Skellefteå AIK; Nashville Predators
- NHL draft: 50th overall, 2014; Los Angeles Kings
- Playing career: 2015–present

Roland McKeown (born January 20, 1996) is a Canadian professional ice hockey defenceman. He is currently playing for San Jose Barracuda of the American Hockey League (AHL). McKeown was selected by the Los Angeles Kings in the second round (50th overall) of the 2014 NHL entry draft.

== Playing career ==
=== Junior ===
==== Kingston Frontenacs ====
McKeown was selected by the Kingston Frontenacs with their first round pick, second overall, in the 2012 OHL Priority Selection. McKeown played in his first OHL game on September 21, 2012, getting no points in a 3–1 win over the Barrie Colts. He scored his first career OHL goal on October 4 against Matej Machovsky of the Brampton Battalion in a 4–1 loss. On February 18, McKeown had a season high three points, as he scored a goal and added two assists, in a 7–4 win over the Mississauga Steelheads. McKeown finished the 2012–13 season with seven goals and 29 points in 61 games, helping the rebuilding Frontenacs reach the post-season. In four playoff games, he was held without a point. McKeown was named to the OHL First All-Rookie Team.

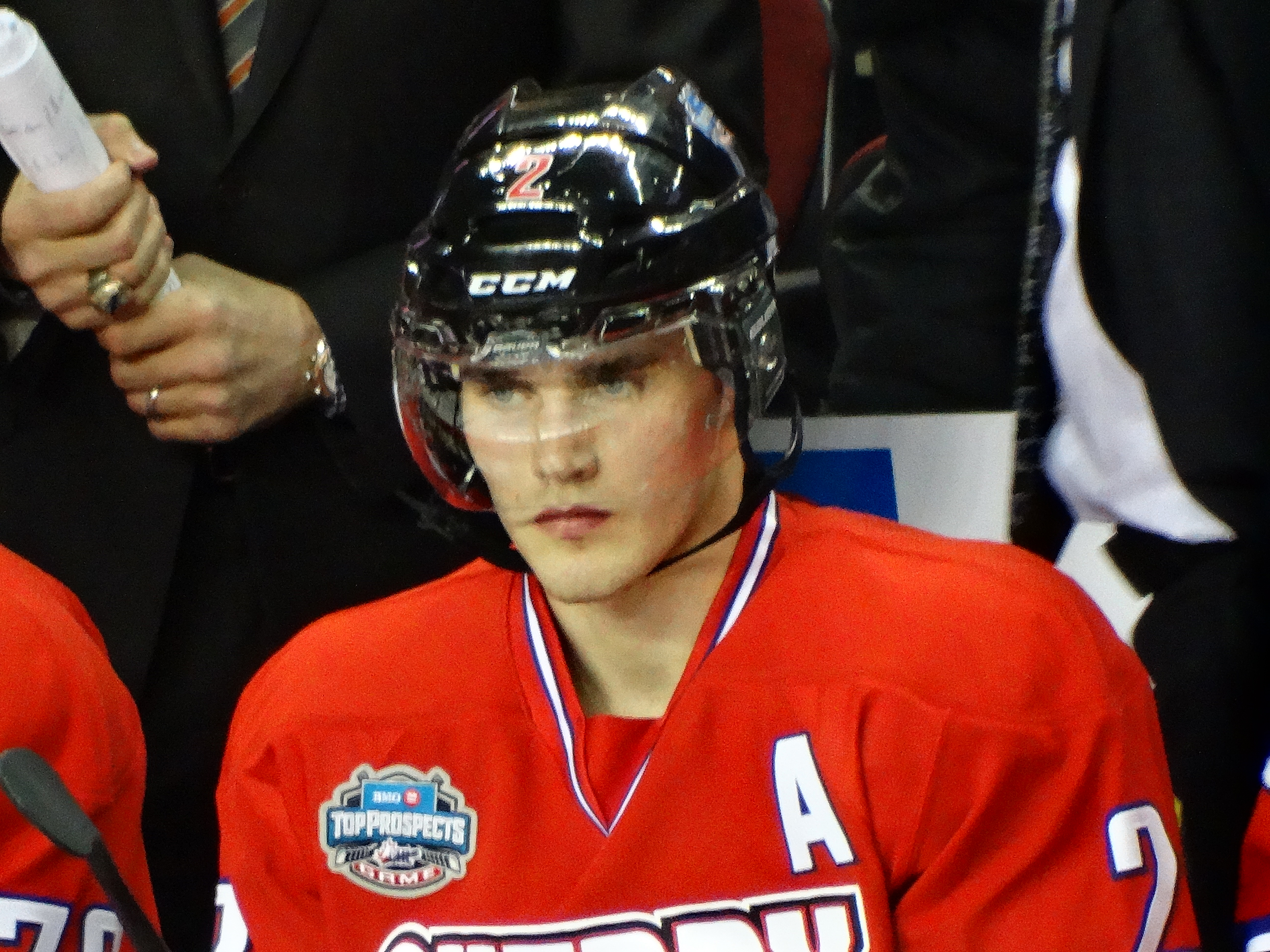
McKeown at the 2014 CHL/NHL Top Prospects Game.

In 2013–14, McKeown improved his offensive numbers, scoring 11 goals and 43 points in 62 games, and had an impressive +38 rating. In the Frontenacs first game of the season, McKeown had four assists in an 11–4 win over the Peterborough Petes. On December 20, McKeown recorded his first two-goal game of his career, scoring twice and added two assists in an 8–5 win over the Ottawa 67's. He participated in the 2014 CHL Top Prospects Game held at the Scotiabank Saddledome in Calgary, Alberta, playing for Team Cherry, where he was held without a point in a 4–3 loss. On March 23, McKeown earned his first career playoff goal against Andrew D'Agostini of the Peterborough Petes in overtime, as the Frontenacs defeated the Petes 5–4. In seven playoff games, McKeown had a goal and four points, as the Frontenacs were upset by the Peterborough Petes in the Eastern Conference quarter-finals.

McKeown was named the captain of the Frontenacs for the 2014–15 season. He struggled offensively, as McKeown scored seven goals and 32 points in 65 games. In the post-season, McKeown was held to an assist in four games as the Frontenacs lost to the North Bay Battalion in the Eastern Conference quarter-finals.

He returned to the Frontenacs in 2015–16, and remained the captain of the team. On November 7, McKeown scored two goals and added an assist in a 5–3 win over the Kitchener Rangers. In 59 games, McKeown scored seven goals and 42 points. In the playoffs, on March 29, McKeown had a goal and four points in a 5–4 win over the Oshawa Generals. In nine post-season games, McKeown scored three goals and 12 points, helping Kingston reach the second round of the OHL playoffs for the first time since 1998.

=== Professional ===
==== Los Angeles Kings ====
McKeown was selected by the Los Angeles Kings in the second round, 50th overall, in the 2014 NHL entry draft held in Philadelphia, Pennsylvania. On February 25, 2015, McKeown's NHL rights were traded by the Kings, along with a conditional first round pick, to the Carolina Hurricanes in exchange for Andrej Sekera.

==== Carolina Hurricanes and Sweden ====
On April 1, 2015, McKeown was signed to a three-year entry-level contract with the Hurricanes. McKeown joined the Hurricanes AHL affiliate, the Charlotte Checkers, on an amateur try-out contract for the final games of the 2014–15 regular season. He made his AHL debut on April 11, getting no points in a 2–0 loss to the Rockford IceHogs. McKeown earned his first career professional point, an assist, the next night, against the IceHogs, in a 4–3 Checkers victory. In four games with Charlotte, McKeown had one assist.

McKeown was assigned to the Charlotte Checkers for the 2016–17 season. He recorded his first AHL goal against Alex Stalock of the Iowa Wild on November 27, in a 5–1 loss. In 71 games with Charlotte, McKeown scored one goal and 11 points, helping the Checkers into the post-season. In five playoff games, McKeown earned three assists, as Charlotte lost to the Chicago Wolves in the first round of the playoffs.

In 2017–18, McKeown saw his first action in the NHL with the Carolina Hurricanes. On November 4, 2017, McKeown appeared in his first game at Gila River Arena in Glendale, Arizona, as he was held scoreless in a 2–1 loss to the Arizona Coyotes. In his next game, McKeown earned two assists in a 3–1 win over the Florida Panthers. Overall, McKeown appeared in 10 games with Carolina, earning three assists. He spent the majority of the 2017–18 season with Charlotte. In 65 games with the Checkers, McKeown scored seven goals and 23 points. He finished third in the AHL in +/- rating, as he was a +34. On May 12, McKeown scored his first career AHL post-season goal against Alex Lyon of the Lehigh Valley Phantoms in a 5–1 loss. Overall, in eight playoff games, McKeown scored a goal and two points.

McKeown played the entire 2018–19 season with the Checkers, scoring four goals and 25 points in 70 games. McKeown once again was among the league leaders in +/– rating, finishing in a tie for seventh with a +30 rating. In the post-season, McKeown had three assists in 10 games, as the Checkers won the Calder Cup.

With both the 2020–21 NHL and AHL seasons delayed due to the COVID-19 pandemic, McKeown was loaned to Skellefteå AIK of the Swedish Hockey League. He was later signed as a restricted free agent by the Hurricanes to a one-year, two-way contract on December 19, 2020, while continuing on loan in the SHL. Mckeown enjoyed a strong season in Sweden, finishing with 9 points in 24 regular season games and helping Skellefteå advance to the Championship semi-finals with 4 points in 12 playoff games, before returning to the Hurricanes organization.

==== Colorado Avalanche ====
As a free agent from the Hurricanes, McKeown was signed to a one-year, two-way contract with the Colorado Avalanche on July 28, 2021. In the 2021–22 season, McKeown was assigned by the Avalanche to play exclusively with AHL affiliate, the Colorado Eagles. In a top four role within the blueline of the Eagles, McKeown contributed with 3 goals and 20 points through 61 games. In elevating his play in the post-season, McKeown helped the Eagles advance to the Division finals in adding 8 assists through 9 games.

==== Nashville Predators ====
Unable to feature with the championship winning Avalanche, McKeown at the conclusion of his contract left as a free agent and was signed to a two-year, two-way contract with the Nashville Predators on July 13, 2022.

==== AHL ====
At the conclusion of his contract with the Predators, McKeown left the club by signing as a free agent to a two-year AHL contract with the San Diego Gulls, primary affiliate to the Anaheim Ducks, on July 2, 2024.

Having played two seasons with San Diego, McKeown left at the conclusion of his contract, opting to continue his career in the AHL in signing a two-year contract with divisional rival the San Jose Barracuda, affiliate to the San Jose Sharks, on July 2, 2026.

== International play ==
McKeown won a gold medal with Team Canada at the 2013 IIHF World U18 Championships.

At the 2016 IIHF World Junior Championships held in Helsinki, McKeown led the Canadian team in plus-minus at +4. Canada reached the quarterfinals, but was eliminated by the host Finland.

== Career statistics ==
=== Regular season and playoffs ===
			Regular season					Playoffs
Season	Team	League	GP	G	A	Pts	PIM	GP	G	A	Pts	PIM
2012–13	Kingston Frontenacs	OHL	61	7	22	29	33	4	0	0	0	4
2013–14	Kingston Frontenacs	OHL	62	11	32	43	61	7	1	3	4	8
2014–15	Kingston Frontenacs	OHL	65	7	25	32	57	4	0	1	1	9
2014–15	Charlotte Checkers	AHL	4	0	1	1	0	—	—	—	—	—
2015–16	Kingston Frontenacs	OHL	59	7	35	42	49	9	3	9	12	6
2016–17	Charlotte Checkers	AHL	71	1	10	11	16	5	0	3	3	5
2017–18	Charlotte Checkers	AHL	65	7	16	23	36	8	1	1	2	4
2017–18	Carolina Hurricanes	NHL	10	0	3	3	19	—	—	—	—	—
2018–19	Charlotte Checkers	AHL	70	4	21	25	56	10	0	3	3	0
2019–20	Charlotte Checkers	AHL	61	4	20	24	50	—	—	—	—	—
2020–21	Skellefteå AIK	SHL	24	4	5	9	16	12	1	3	4	10
2021–22	Colorado Eagles	AHL	61	3	17	20	49	9	0	8	8	18
2022–23	Milwaukee Admirals	AHL	60	6	16	22	40	14	2	2	4	4
2022–23	Nashville Predators	NHL	6	0	0	0	8	—	—	—	—	—
2023–24	Milwaukee Admirals	AHL	69	6	17	23	56	14	2	2	4	19
2024–25	San Diego Gulls	AHL	69	15	23	38	46	—	—	—	—	—
2025–26	San Diego Gulls	AHL	71	5	20	25	44	2	0	0	0	10
NHL totals			16	0	3	3	27	—	—	—	—	—
SHL totals			24	4	5	9	16	12	1	3	4	10

=== International ===
Year	Team	Event	Result	GP	G	A	Pts	PIM
2013	Canada Ontario	U17	6th	5	0	3	3	6
2013	Canada	U18	1st place, gold medalist(s)	7	0	1	1	0
2013	Canada	IH18	1st place, gold medalist(s)	5	0	1	1	6
2014	Canada	U18	3rd place, bronze medalist(s)	7	0	1	1	2
2016	Canada	WJC	6th	5	0	0	0	2
Junior totals				29	0	6	6	16

== Awards and honours ==
Award	Year
OHL
First All-Rookie Team	2013
CHL/NHL Top Prospects Game	2014
Third All-Star Team	2016
AHL
Calder Cup (Charlotte Checkers)	2019
International
World U18 Championship Gold Medal with Team Canada	2013
