= Peter Grubb (mason) =

- Born: c. 1702; Brandywine Hundred, Delaware
- Died: 1754; Wilmington, Delaware
- Occupations: Mason, Ironmaster, Real Estate Investor
- Known for: Founded Cornwall Ironworks
- Spouses: Martha Bates (m. 1732 ); Hannah Mendenhall (m. 1741)
- Children: Curtis Grubb; Peter Grubb, Jr.
- Parent(s): John and Frances Grubb

Peter Grubb (c. 1702 – 1754), the founder of the Grubb Family Iron Dynasty, discovered Cornwall Iron Mines and established Cornwall Iron Furnace, together one of the largest ironworks in Colonial Pennsylvania. The Cornwall Iron Mines are the largest U.S. iron mines ever discovered east of Lake Superior.

The youngest of the seven sons of John Grubb and his wife Frances of Brandywine Hundred, Peter first learned the stonemasonry trade. In 1729, he built a water corn and boulting mill in Bradford, Pennsylvania. He constructed his first iron bloomery (a crude form of furnace) in 1737 at Furnace Creek, on the modern border of Lancaster and Lebanon counties.

Grubb constructed a regular iron furnace, known as Hopewell on Hammer Creek near his bloomery. As he started to operate Hopewell, Peter soon located three mountains of magnetic iron ore just west of the furnace. He decided to mine the ore and by 1739 had acquired over 1,000 acres (4.0 km^{2}) that he called Cornwall Iron Mines, in honor of his father's birthplace. In 1742, he opened Cornwall Iron Furnace to take advantage of the discovery. Peter Grubb's Hopewell Forge Mansion, completed around 1740 and later occupied by his son Peter Jr., still stands about six miles (10 km) from Cornwall on present-day Route 322.

In 1745 Peter decided to relinquish direct control of the ironworks, and he leased the operation to Cury and Company for 20 years at £250 a year. He moved with his wife to Wilmington, Delaware, where he engaged in the buying and selling of real estate and lived out his life.

== Legacy ==
Peter's sons Curtis and Peter Jr. inherited the ironworks after his death in 1754. They took over operation around 1765, after the lease expired, and quickly expanded the business, later becoming significant providers of munitions to the Revolutionary War effort. Unfortunately, most of the Cornwall ironworks fell out of the Grubb family's hands by 1802. But later generations, starting with Peter Jr.'s son Henry Bates Grubb, built on the remaining holdings with great success. From 1840 to 1870 the Grubbs were among the leading iron manufacturers in Pennsylvania, with Mount Hope Estate serving as their center of operations.

== Personal life ==
On 2nd mo. 12, 1732 [12 Apr 1732] at Caln, PA Monthly Meeting of Friends, Peter Grubb married Martha Bates (or Bate), widow of James Wall. Martha Bates, a native of Newton Township, New Jersey, was the daughter of Jeremiah Bates and Mary Spicer, and the granddaughter of William Bates, a founder of Newton Colony in 1681. Peter and Martha Grubb had two sons, Curtis Grubb (circa 1733 - 1789) and Peter Grubb, Jr. (1740–1786). After Martha died, Peter remarried on 12th mo. 10, 1741 [10 Feb 1742] to Hannah, daughter of Benjamin Mendenhall and widow of Thomas Marshall. In 1745, Peter and Hannah Grubb retired to Wilmington, Delaware, where he engaged in the buying and selling of real estate.

== Notable descendants ==
- Curtis Grubb (c. 1730–1789) was two-thirds owner of the Cornwall Iron Furnace and colonel of the 2nd Lancaster Battalion during the American Revolution.
- Peter Grubb, Jr. (1740–1786) was one-third owner of the Cornwall Iron Furnace and colonel of the 8th Lancaster Battalion during the American Revolution.
- Henry Bates Grubb (1774–1823) founded the Grubb family's Mount Hope iron empire, which became one of the largest Pennsylvania iron producers in the mid-19th century.
- Jehu Grubb (c. 1781–1854) was an early settler and Justice of the Peace in Stark County, Ohio, a War of 1812 veteran who served in the Ohio House of Representatives in 1828 and 1832.
- Samuel P. Heintzelman (1805–1880) was a Civil War General who commanded the 3rd Corps during the Peninsula Campaign.
- Edward Burd Grubb, Jr. (1841–1913) was a Civil War General, a candidate for Governor, and later Ambassador to Spain. After the war he joined the family iron business as President of the Lebanon Valley Furnace Company.
- George Grey Barnard (1863–1938) was a noted sculptor who founded the Cloisters collection that is now a part of the New York Metropolitan Museum of Art.
- Stuart Heintzelman (1876–1935) was a career Army officer who was promoted to General in 1931.
- Edward Burd Grubb III (1893–1973) was President of the New York Curb Exchange during the critical period after the creation of the SEC.
