= Henry Bates Grubb =

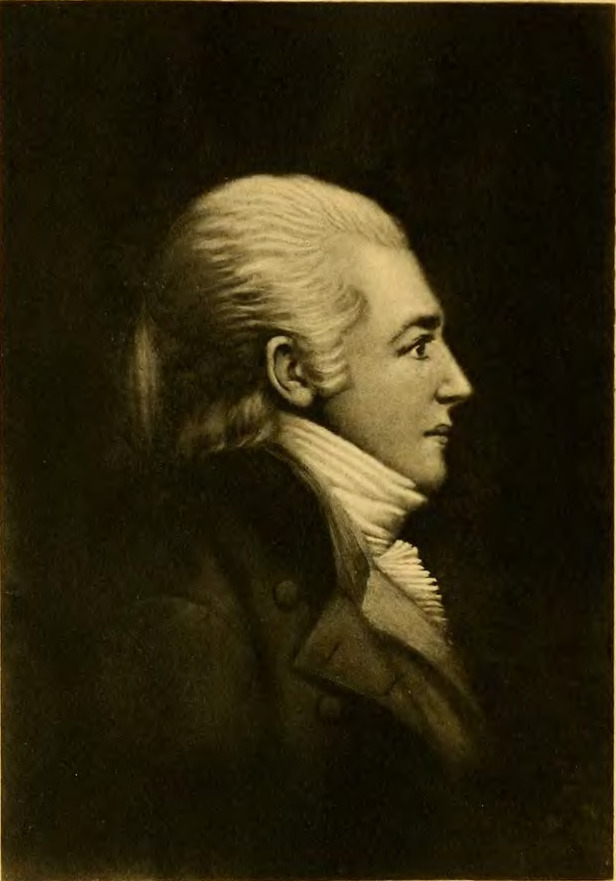
- Born: February 6, 1774; Hopewell, Pennsylvania
- Died: March 9, 1823 (aged 49); Mount Hope, Pennsylvania
- Occupation: Ironmaster
- Known for: Built Grubb family's iron making empire at Mount Hope
- Spouses: Ann Carson (m. 1805; died 1806) Harriet Buckley (m. 1808)
- Children: six sons, two daughters
- Parent(s): Peter Grubb, Jr., Mary Burd
- Relatives: Alan Burd Grubb (brother); Curtis Grubb (uncle); Jehu Grubb (cousin)

Henry Bates Grubb (February 6, 1774 – March 9, 1823) was a third-generation member of the Grubb Family Iron Dynasty, the founder of the family's enterprises headquartered at Mount Hope near Lancaster, Pennsylvania, and perhaps the family's first "true" ironmaster. He was the son and heir of Peter Grubb, Jr. who, with his brother Curtis, had owned and operated the Cornwall ironworks founded by their father Peter Grubb in 1737. Henry and his heirs rebuilt the family business after most of the original Peter Grubb holdings were gradually acquired by Robert Coleman between 1783 and 1802. The Grubbs and Colemans were among the largest iron producers in Pennsylvania through the mid-19th century.

== Business career ==
Henry Bates Grubb, along with his older brother Alan Burd Grubb, inherited their father's iron making holdings after his death in 1786 at the age of 45. They were only 11 and 13 at the time. The ownership of the iron making properties, resulting from legal partitioning of the various Grubb holdings, had become very contentious between their father Peter and his brother Curtis, and also involved Robert Coleman. While a resolution of these issues had been agreed upon in 1785, Peter's death in 1786 nullified the agreement. The boys' inheritance had to be resolved by a jury, which found it a difficult matter. The jury finally made a recommendation in 1787, to which the parties agreed. Curtis and Coleman received the Cornwall Iron Furnace and 6,520 acres (26.4 km^{2}) of land; the Grubbs received the Hopewell Forges and 3,741 acres (15.14 km^{2}) of land, and their father's furnace at Mount Hope. The agreement also stipulated that all parties would have full access to the iron mines at Cornwall to extract whatever ore they needed for the operation of their furnaces.

Henry apparently decided early on to enter the iron business, because he was still not of age when he purchased his older brother's share of the inheritance in 1798, for $29,266 to be paid over time. Alan had decided not to enter the iron business, and eventually became a medical doctor in Tennessee. Their father's friend and prominent attorney Jasper Yeates, and Edward Burd, had been appointed the boys' guardians and certainly assisted with the transaction.

Henry was barely seventeen when he began a series of transactions to rebuild the family iron business, acquiring several properties. The combined operations grew to become one of the largest iron producers in Pennsylvania over the next century. In 1800 Henry built the Mount Vernon Furnace on Conewago Creek. In 1802 he purchased the Hellan Iron Works and renamed it the Codorus Forge. He also purchased land on Manada Creek in Dauphin County on which his sons later built a furnace. His sons further expanded the holdings during the 19th century.

In 1802 Henry agreed to the partition of the common holdings between himself and Coleman, in order to obtain the funds to pay off his brother. Coleman received the Hopewell Forges and another one-sixth interest in the Cornwall iron banks, while Henry retained a one-sixth interest in the iron banks to supply his Mount Hope Furnace which he fully owned.

== Personal life ==
Henry Bates Grubb, the second son of Peter Grubb, Jr., was born at Hopewell on February 6, 1774. His mother died after childbirth, leaving Henry and his older brother in the care of a cousin Hannah Bellarby Grubb. Hannah soon bore their father a daughter, Hannah Elizabeth, but Peter didn't want to marry so Hannah and her daughter left Peter's household, apparently for his brother Curtis' household, whose wife had also died and whose son Jehu Grubb she also apparently bore. The boys were at school in York, Pennsylvania, when their father committed suicide in 1786.

Henry began his iron making career early on, and was apparently determined to make it a success. An iron master of the time needed an appropriate residence, and Henry had begun the Mount Hope Mansion by 1800. He may have designed the elaborate formal gardens himself. The mansion and gardens were completed by 1805, and various outbuildings and a church were added over the years. Mount Hope Estate became the center of the family's iron making empire and is currently listed on the National Register of Historic Places.

Henry married Ann Carson on June 18, 1805. They had a son Henry Carson, but she died shortly thereafter on October 19, 1806. Henry remarried, to Harriet Amelia Buckley, on December 1, 1808. They had five sons and two daughters before his death in 1823, managed Mount Hope Estate until 1836, and died in 1858. Three of their sons, Edward Burd, Clement Brooke and Alfred Bates, grew to adulthood and further expanded the Grubb Family Iron Dynasty.

Henry Bates Grubb died at Mount Hope on March 9, 1823, at the age of 49, and is buried there with Harriet at St. James Episcopal Church.

== Notable descendants ==
=== Sons who continued the family iron dynasty ===
- Edward Burd Grubb, Sr. (1810–1867) was a family ironmaster, an ardent abolitionist, and a leading citizen in Burlington, New Jersey.
- Clement Brooke Grubb (1815–1889) ironmaster and banker, manager of Mount Hope Estate, owner of several iron furnaces.
- Alfred Bates Grubb (1821–1885) bought 50% of Mount Hope Estate and furnace from Clement for $25,000, later his estate sold it back for $300,000.

=== Other descendants ===
- Edward Burd Grubb, Jr. (1841–1913) was a Civil War General, a candidate for Governor, and later Ambassador to Spain. After the war he joined the family iron business as President of the Lebanon Valley Furnace Company.
- Daisy Elizabeth Brooke Grubb (1850–1936) was the youngest daughter of Clement Brooke Grubb. She inherited the Mount Hope Estate and was its last family resident. She transformed the 12 room Federal style mansion into a 32-room Victorian mansion that is listed on the National Register of Historic Places.
- Edward Burd Grubb III (1893–1973) was President of the New York Curb Exchange during the critical period after the creation of the SEC.
