= Curtis Grubb =

American politician

- Born: c.1730 Pennsylvania
- Died: January 22, 1789; Cornwall, Pennsylvania
- Occupation: Ironmaster
- Known for: Co-owner of Cornwall Ironworks and operator of Cornwall Furnace; one of the largest enslavers in Pennsylvania history
- Title: Colonel, 2nd Lancaster Battalion
- Spouse: Ann Few (m.1754 - dv.1769) Elizabeth Carpenter (m.c1771 - d.c1775) Ann Grubb (m.1783 - d.1789)
- Partner(s): Hannah Bellarby Grubb, aka "Aunt Ann" (c.1775—1783)
- Children: four sons, three daughters
- Parent(s): Peter Grubb, Martha Bates
- Relatives: Peter Grubb, Jr. (brother), Nathaniel Grubb (uncle)

Curtis Grubb (c.1730–1789), Patriot and oldest son of Peter and Martha Bates Grubb, was a second-generation member of the Grubb Family Iron Dynasty along with his younger brother Peter Jr. The brothers operated the Cornwall Ironworks, making significant contributions to the American Revolutionary War effort, and Curtis served several terms in the Pennsylvania Provincial Assembly. He was also one of the largest enslavers in Pennsylvania at the time of independence, registering twenty-five people as his property in 1780 in accordance with state gradual abolition law.

The brothers inherited the ironworks from their father in 1754, with Curtis (the oldest) receiving a two-thirds interest and Peter one-third. The brothers took over operation of the ironworks about 1765 and expanded it successfully. Curtis operated the Cornwall Furnace that produced pig iron, and Peter, who had more ironmaking experience, ran the nearby Hopewell Forges on Hammer Creek that produced more valuable bar iron. In 1773, Curtis paid taxes on 1,000 acres (4.0 km^{2}) at the furnace location and Peter paid taxes on 500 acres (2.0 km^{2}) at the forges location, reflecting both the size of the operation and their proportional ownership. They operated the business through and after the Revolution, becoming quite prosperous until they died, Peter in 1786 and Curtis in 1789.

Most of the Cornwall ironworks fell out of family hands during the period 1783 - 1802, to Robert Coleman who became Pennsylvania's first millionaire. But a portion, including rights to access the ore, remained with Peter Jr.'s heirs, who added to it to become major Pennsylvania producers of iron in the mid-19th century, operating out of Mount Hope Estate.

== Patriotism ==
Curtis Grubb was an outspoken radical and an early supporter of the Revolution. The brothers were major contributors to the Revolutionary War effort, their ironworks supplied cannon, ammunition, shot and saltpans (used to make salt from seawater) to the Colonial forces. George Washington personally visited Cornwall to inspect the facility. Both brothers were elected as militia colonels, Curtis' unit was the 2nd Lancaster Battalion, Peter Jr.'s the 8th Lancaster Battalion, both assigned to the Flying Camp. Curtis was elected to the Pennsylvania Assembly in 1775, 1777, 1778 and 1782.

An interesting anecdote provides a bit of insight into the times. One of Curtis' roles during the war was to oversee 340 Hessian prisoners of war who had been brought to Cornwall in August 1777 to help alleviate the severe war-induced shortage of labor. The Hessians were housed in a local Moravian Congregation's meeting house, over the objections of the pastor. Unfortunately, they behaved poorly and caused serious problems, including damage to church property. Later, the pastor told Curtis that "they made themselves outrageously drunk, and then the women began to fight; after them the men, who took sides with the women; finally the fight became general."

== Business career ==
Peter and his brother took over the operation of the ironworks about 1765, with Peter operating the Hopewell Forges and Curtis the Cornwall Furnace. They were successful operators of the ironworks through the Revolution. They were, however, complex individuals whose affairs were closely intertwined and became increasingly acrimonious. Their ongoing feuds and legal entanglements led to the fragmentation of the ironwork's ownership and its eventual loss by the Grubb family into the hands of Robert Coleman, who used it to build his fortune. Both the Grubbs and the Colemans used African American slave labor in their operations.

Tensions between the brothers reached the crisis point in 1783 when Curtis decided to marry his 20-year-old cousin Ann Grubb, granddaughter of the brothers' uncle Nathaniel Grubb. Curtis' oldest son, Peter III, became concerned for his inheritance and demanded a resolution. Curtis conveyed to his son an interest in the ironworks, which unfortunately required a legal subdivision of the assets that had previously been shared informally. Included in Peter III's new assets was a one-third interest in the Hopewell Forges on Hammer Creek. Peter, who had been running the forges, became fearful and reacted by purchasing land at a place he called Mount Hope to build his own furnace in competition with his brother, going heavily into debt. The feud intensified and Peter III became concerned for the business and sold his interest to Robert Coleman, a friend who had worked for the brothers and was by then also an ironmaster. Curtis reacted to the competition from his brother and allied himself with Coleman, trying various tactics to put his brother out of business. Succumbing to the pressure, Peter became distraught and committed suicide in 1786. The ironworks were apportioned by the courts among Curtis, Peter's estate, and Coleman. Coleman also later acquired the Hopewell Forges from Peter's heirs.

Upon Curtis' death in 1789, his estate passed to his heirs, primarily to his son Curtis Jr. But he was only 17 and in poor health; he died in 1790, leaving his inheritance to other family members, none of whom could operate the ironworks. Coleman managed the ironworks for the family until 1798, when they agreed to sell to him. With his previous acquisitions Robert Coleman became the owner of most of the former Grubb holdings, which he added to his own and expanded to become Pennsylvania's first millionaire.

The holdings remaining in Peter Jr.'s estate were eventually expanded upon by his second son Henry Bates Grubb, whose family went on to become one of Pennsylvania's largest iron producers in the mid-19th century, with their center of operations at Mount Hope Estate.

== Personal life ==
Curtis was the more gregarious of the brothers and led a sometimes unconventional life. He married Ann Few in 1754 and in 1757 they had a son, Peter Grubb III. But marriage didn't agree with Curtis and he left for Europe soon thereafter, abandoning his family. Such a tactic was not uncommon in colonial America, where divorce was virtually impossible. Ann, believing Curtis to be dead, remarried to Archibald McNeal in 1763 and had a child. But Curtis did return and eventually wanted to rectify the situation and requested the Provincial Assembly to dissolve the marriage and allow him to remarry. No one had ever been granted a divorce allowing for remarriage; but Curtis pressed his case and by a special act of the Assembly in 1769, he was granted a divorce.

All acts passed by colonial legislatures had to be reviewed by the British Board of Trade, and it was thought that the unprecedented nature of this act might have impinged upon the powers reserved to Parliament. Curtis' divorce was allowed to become final, but in 1772 the Governors of the Colonies were directed not to accept any further acts of divorce passed by colonial legislatures. This was an example of the kinds of British actions experienced by the colonists that led to their desire for independence.

After the divorce Curtis married Elizabeth Carpenter and they had two children, Curtis Jr. in 1772 and Elizabeth about 1775. Elizabeth Carpenter appears to have died sometime after their daughter was born, as she disappeared from the historical records.

In 1783 Curtis decided to marry his 20 year old cousin Ann Grubb, which of course led to the family crisis described above. Curtis and Ann had three children, Samuel, Martha and Julianna, before Curtis died in 1789 at the age of 59. Curtis was buried at the Tabor Reformed Church cemetery, later removed to the Old Hebron cemetery in Lebanon.

== History revised ==
The six children, from Ann Few, Elizabeth Carpenter and Ann Grubb, comprised Curtis' acknowledged family. But Curtis' personal life from 1775 to 1783 is not well documented and Curtis would have had two infant children needing motherly attention. Fortunately for historians, Curtis Jr., who was the principal heir to his father's estate, died as a teenager and left a will leaving his recently inherited estate to family members, primarily to his sister Elizabeth. Close examination of that will, probably written by the family, sheds light on that eight-year period.

Curtis Jr.'s will left most of his estate to his sister Elizabeth (who soon sold it to Robert Coleman), but surprisingly also left small bequests to a Jehu Grubb "for his education" and an "Aunt Ann" Grubb. "Aunt Ann" appears to have been Hannah Bellarby Grubb, an adoptive cousin who was the adopted daughter of Curtis' uncle Samuel Grubb. Hannah had come to help Peter Jr. as his housekeeper in 1774 after his wife died in childbirth, and they had a daughter, Hannah Elizabeth, later that same year. Peter Jr. didn't want to marry again and it appears Hannah moved to Curtis' household to care for his infant children, along with her own. She probably remained in Curtis' household until he decided to marry Ann, at which time she and their son Jehu would have been forced to move out. Perhaps the family, who wrote the will, felt they were owed something, or perhaps they wanted to avoid any potential claims to the estate. The theory is strongly supported by the fact that Hannah, not his third wife Ann, was buried near Curtis at Tabor Reformed Church. Her headstone at Old Hebron cemetery in Lebanon, to which the graves were moved, proclaims her as Curtis Grubb's wife.

Of Curtis' acknowledged children only Peter III had children. But Jehu went on to a notable life in Stark County, Ohio, and had a large family. Ironically, Curtis Grubb's only documented descendants still carrying the Grubb surname are through Jehu.

== Notable Descendants ==
=== Son ===
- Jehu Grubb (c1781 - 1854) was an early settler and Justice of the Peace in Stark County, Ohio, a War of 1812 veteran who served in the Ohio House of Representatives in 1828 and 1832.

=== Descendants of Peter III ===
- George Grey Barnard (1863–1938) was a noted sculptor who founded the Cloisters collection that is now a part of the New York Metropolitan Museum of Art.
- Curtis Grubb Culin III (1915–1963), a sergeant and tank commander with the 102nd Cavalry Reconnaissance Group in World War II, credited with inventing the "Rhino tank" blades for busting through the Normandy hedgerows during the breakout from the Normandy beachhead in July 1944.

=== Descendant of Jehu ===
- Firman R. Grubb (1896—1983) was the legendary lawman of Kent, Ohio, who twice gained national recognition, once in Ripley's Believe It Or Not newspaper strip.
