= Grubb Family Iron Dynasty =

Iron manufacturing enterprises in Pennsylvania

The Grubb Family Iron Dynasty was a succession of iron manufacturing enterprises owned and operated by Grubb family members for more than 165 years. Collectively, they were Pennsylvania's leading iron manufacturer between 1840 and 1870.

About 1737, Peter Grubb entered the iron business after discovering the vast and rich Cornwall Iron Mines (Cornwall Banks) in Lebanon County, about 21 miles north of Lancaster. Peter and the next five generations of his descendants operated and expanded the business until they owned or operated in close association with at least 18 iron production operations and several thousand acres of property in eastern Pennsylvania.

Grubb's heirs sold most of the original properties between 1786 and 1803 to Robert Coleman, who became Pennsylvania's first millionaire and whose operations were continued through the 19th century by his heirs. Beginning in 1800, the heirs of Curtis' brother Peter Grubb, Jr. rebuilt their business on the minority interest they retained, primarily in the Cornwall Iron Mines, and operated for nearly 100 years out of Mount Hope. The Grubb and Coleman families were competitors, but also partners due to their shared interests in the ore fields.

Both families' operations bowed to the advances of iron and steel technology in the latter part of the 19th century and were gradually sold between 1883 and 1926. Many of the Grubb holdings and the Cornwall Iron Mines were sold in 1902 to the Pennsylvania Steel Company, which was acquired by Bethlehem Steel in 1916. The remaining Coleman holdings and the related Robesonia Iron Company were also sold to Bethlehem Steel, in 1919 and 1926 respectively. Bethlehem Steel continued to mine iron ore at Cornwall until 1973.

== People ==
In 1677, John Grubb came from Cornwall, U.K., and settled in Brandywine Hundred, Delaware, where he established a tannery. His son Peter launched iron operations that eventually linked six generations of people, including:

=== First generation ===
- Peter Grubb Sr. (1702–1754): Founded the Cornwall Ironworks when he discovered the vast iron ore fields at Cornwall, PA, about 1737 and built the Cornwall Furnace and Hopewell Forges by 1742. He leased the operations to Cury & Company until 1765 and removed to Wilmington, Delaware, where he bought and sold real estate and lived out his life. Succeeding family generations built their fortunes on his discovery.

=== Second generation ===
- Curtis Grubb (1730–1789): Peter's eldest son and Patriot. 4/6 owner-in-common of the Cornwall Ironworks and operator of the Cornwall Furnace from 1765 to 1789. Built the Union Forge in 1882. His pending remarriage in 1783 spawned inheritance issues that led to the 1885-6 partition of the Grubb holdings. By 1795, Curtis' holdings had been sold by his heirs to Robert Coleman; they had all died by 1805. Curtis did have a son, Jehu Grubb, unacknowledged and not an heir, who became an early settler and leading citizen of Stark County, Ohio.
- Peter Grubb Jr. (1740–1786): Peter's youngest son and Patriot. 2/6 owner-in-common of the Cornwall Ironworks and operator of the Hopewell Forges from 1765 to 1786. He reacted to the forced partition by building his own Mount Hope Furnace in 1784 to compete with his brother; he took his own life in 1786. His heirs rebuilt the family iron business from Mount Hope in the 19th century.

=== Third generation ===
- Peter Grubb III (1757–1805): Curtis' eldest son and heir, was actually called Peter Jr. at the time to distinguish him from his uncle Peter; however, this article uses Peter III to distinguish him from his uncle Peter Jr. A former officer and prisoner of war in the Revolution, he began the gradual sale of the Grubb holdings to Robert Coleman when he sold his inherited 1/3 share of the Hopewell Forges and 1/6 share of the rest of the Cornwall Ironworks to him in 1785.
- Curtis Grubb Jr. (1772–1790): Curtis' son and principal heir, inherited his father's remaining 3/6 share of the Cornwall Ironworks but soon left it to his sister Elizabeth when he died as a teenager in 1790. He mentioned his half-brother Jehu Grubb in his will.
- Elizabeth Grubb (c. 1775 – after 1795): Curtis' daughter and subsequent heir, inherited the 3/6 share of the Cornwall Ironworks from her late brother Curtis Jr. and furthered the gradual sale of the Grubb holdings to Robert Coleman by selling her share to him in 1795.
Henry Bates Grubb
- Alan Burd Grubb (1772–1828): Peter Jr.'s eldest son, inherited half of his father's estate but sold it to his brother Henry in 1798 for $29,266. He became a physician in Tennessee.
- Henry Bates Grubb (1774–1823): Peter Jr.'s youngest son, founded and built the 19th-century Grubb family iron empire from 1800 to 1823, building on the legacy of his father's Mount Hope Furnace and remaining 2/6 share of the Cornwall Ironworks. Henry financed his efforts, including the purchase of additional properties, with proceeds from the final sale of most of the original Grubb holdings to Robert Coleman; their transactions in 1798 and 1802 left Coleman with the Hopewell Forges and Henry with the Mount Hope Furnace and only a 1/6 interest in the Cornwall ore bank.
- Harriett Amelia Buckley Grubb (1788–1858): Henry's widow, oversaw the Grubb operations for several years after his death, until the sons came of age.

=== Fourth generation ===
- Curtis Grubb (1781–1847), son of Peter Grubb III, owned the Gray's Ferry Inn south of Philadelphia from 1805 to 1825.
Edward Burd Grubb
- Edward Burd Grubb, Sr. (1810–1867): Henry's eldest son, was sent to Europe in 1830 to study the latest iron technology. He returned to partner with his brother Clement in 1833, under the name E. & C.B., to run the family business, then consisting of interests in at least five properties. They rebuilt the old furnaces and expanded the operations. In 1837 he moved his family to Burlington, NJ, where he became one of its leading citizens and an ardent abolitionist.
Clement Brooke Grubb
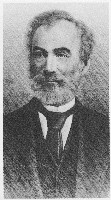
- Clement Brooke Grubb (1815–1889): Henry's second son, entered the family business in 1832 and partnered with his older brother Edward in 1833, under the name E. & C.B., becoming the manager of the Mount Hope Estate. He sold his half interest in the Mount Hope Estate to his younger brother Alfred in 1845 and moved to Lancaster. He left E. & C.B. about that time, apparently to strike out on his own. He acquired the Chestnut Hill Ore Banks by 1851 and built the St. Charles Furnace in 1852. In 1872, Clement formed a new partnership with his son Charles (C.B. Grubb and Son) and they purchased the Henry Clay Furnace (renamed St. Charles #2) in 1875. At his death, Clement was said to have been the wealthiest person in Lancaster County.
- Alfred Bates Grubb (1821–1885): Henry's youngest son, was involved in the family business and acquired a half interest in the Mount Hope Estate for $25,000 from his brother Clement in 1845. He continued to manage Mount Hope, and was involved with Edward and Edward's heirs until at least 1873. After Alfred's death in 1885, Mount Hope was sold back to Clement for $300,000. Alfred's children were not involved in the iron business.

=== Fifth generation ===
E. Burd Grubb, Jr.
- Edward Burd Grubb, Jr. (1841–1913): Edward Sr.'s eldest son, known as E. Burd Grubb, was a noted Civil War General and politician who made his fortune in the family iron business after the war. Like his father a resident of Burlington, NJ, he assumed his father's position as President of the Lebanon Valley Furnace Company in 1865 and owned the Lebanon Valley Furnace. Gen. Grubb may have been the last family member to actively participate in the iron business when he retired, probably in 1911.
- Henry Bates Grubb (1848–1919): Edward Sr.'s third son, was Vice President of the Conewago Iron Company that owned the Conewago Furnace.
- Charles Ross Grubb (1851–1928 ): Edward Sr.'s youngest son, often known as C. Ross Grubb, purchased the Eagle Furnace in 1869, at the age of 18. He was educated at Andover and Yale. He formed a relationship with the Haldeman iron manufacturing family and in 1888 partnered in the firm of Haldeman, Grubb and Company to own and operate Chickies Furnaces #1 and #2 until 1899. By 1892, C. Ross was President of the Conewago Iron Company that owned the Conewago Furnace. He was President of the Cornwall Ore Bank Company when it was sold to the Pennsylvania Steel Company (later acquired by Bethlehem Steel) in 1902.
- Charles Brooke Grubb (1844–1911): Clement's eldest son, joined his father in 1872 under the name C.B. Grubb and Son. The partners owned both St. Charles Furnaces plus the Codorus Iron Mines, and Charles owned the Chestnut Hill Ore Bank in 1904.
- Ella Jane Brooke (Grubb) Smith (1847–1920): Clement's daughter and wife of ironmaster Col. Heber Smith, owner of the Joanna Furnace in Berks County.
- Daisy Elizabeth Brooke Grubb (1850–1936): Clement's youngest daughter, inherited substantial holdings from her father but sold most of the industrial holdings in 1902. She became a wealthy Lancaster spinster and socialite who, beginning in 1895, renovated the 12-room Federal style residence at Mount Hope Estate into a 32-room Victorian mansion. She entertained many prominent citizens at the mansion and was the last family member to reside there.

=== Sixth generation ===
- Parker Ross Grubb (1876–1920): C. Ross Grubb's only son, was educated at Yale and, after his service in the Spanish American War, joined the family business briefly until it was sold.

== Cornwall era (1734–1800) ==
Cornwall Iron Furnace
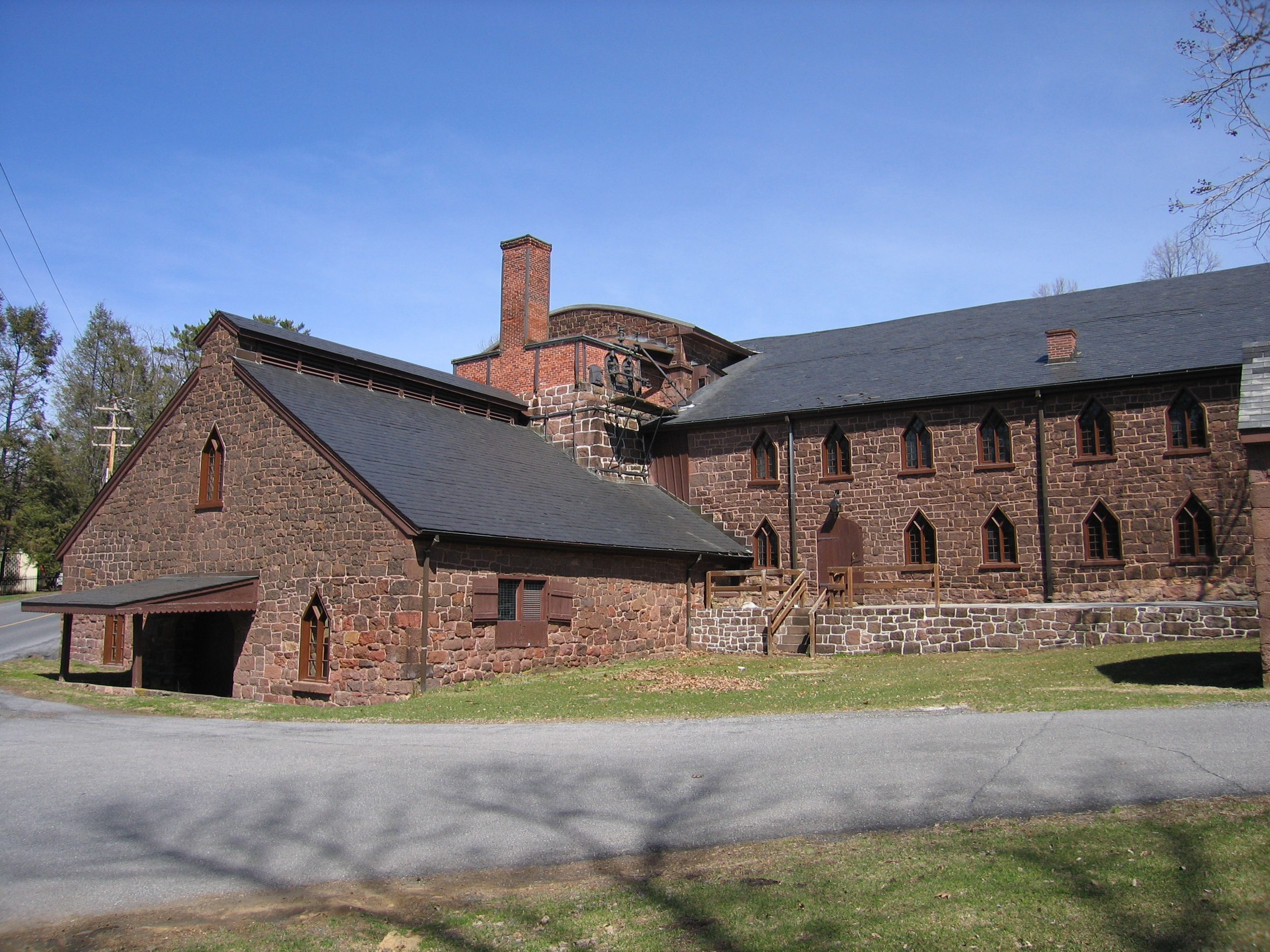

Cornwall, Pennsylvania, was the center of the early Grubb Family Iron Dynasty in the 18th century. It later served a similar role for the Coleman Family operations.

=== Founding (first generation, 1734–65) ===
The Grubb family enterprises began when Peter Grubb, a stonemason by training, discovered at Cornwall, Pennsylvania between 1734 and 1737, what proved to be the largest domestic iron ore deposit east of Lake Superior. Grubb purchased 1,000 acres of iron-rich property and began manufacturing activities at the Cornwall Iron Furnace and Hopewell Forges in 1742. The business thrived at Cornwall, operating until 1765 under lease by a group of businessmen named Cury & Company, while Grubb removed to Wilmington, Delaware, where he lived out his life.

=== Patriot years (second generation, 1765–89) ===
Peter's sons Curtis Grubb and Peter Grubb, Jr. inherited the iron works after their father died in 1754, and took over operation in 1765. The ironmaster brothers were both Patriots of the American Revolution and Colonels of local militia; their iron works developed and supplied significant quantities of cannon and other munitions to the war effort. With the heavy demand for iron products and the accompanying inflation during the war, the brothers (and other ironmasters) realized handsome profits in the service of their new country. Curtis added the Union Forge to the holdings about 1782. They continued to operate the iron works, producing several hundred tons annually, Curtis at the Cornwall Furnace and Peter at the Hopewell Forges, until they died, Peter Jr. in 1786 and Curtis in 1789. Their residential mansions at both locations still stand today.

=== Partition and divestiture (1783–1803) ===
The Grubb brothers unfortunately had a serious falling out beginning in 1783, when Curtis' pending remarriage spawned inheritance anxieties by his oldest son Peter III, 26, who had been a Captain of the Continental Army and a prisoner of war. Curtis acquiesced and decided to give his son his inheritance before the wedding, which subsequently required the courts to formally partition the family operations and allocate ownership shares among Curtis, Peter Jr., and Peter III.

Peter Jr. retained a 2/3 interest in the Hopewell Forges but only a 1/3 interest in the rest of the holdings (Cornwall Furnace and Ore Banks, and Union Forge). Peter III received the remaining 1/3 interest in the Hopewell Forges, plus a 1/6 interest in the rest. Peter Jr. feared for the future supply of raw pig iron to his Hopewell Forges that was to become his legacy to his sons, so he decided to build his own furnace at a place south of Cornwall he called Mount Hope, where he had purchased 212 acres. The brothers were now in competition and their relations became increasingly acrimonious. Peter III grew concerned for the business and sold his holdings (1/3 share of the Hopewell Forges and 1/6 share of the rest) to a family friend, Robert Coleman, on September 26, 1785, for 8,500 pounds of gold. All of this weighed heavily on Peter Jr., who had gone deeply into debt to build his furnace; the pressures of competing family operations, and his own poor health, led him to take his own life at Hopewell on January 17, 1786.

After Curtis' subsequent passing in 1789, none of his heirs were willing or able to manage the operations and there were complex family inheritance and legal issues still to be resolved by the courts. Robert Coleman had worked for the brothers and was in a position to step in as the family became increasingly unable to manage the business. As a result, in 1895 Curtis' remaining heirs sold their 3/6 interest to Coleman, and by 1803 he had acquired the Hopewell Forges and 5/6 of the rest of the original properties. A successful ironmaster and businessman in his own right, Coleman took over the Cornwall operations, acquired other properties, and went on to become Pennsylvania's first millionaire.

It was fortunate for Peter Jr.'s heirs that he decided to begin iron-making operations at Mount Hope. Since the Colemans were now operating out of Cornwall, Mount Hope was destined to become the headquarters of a new and much larger Grubb family iron business.

== Mount Hope era (1800–1902) ==
Mount Hope Estate Mansion

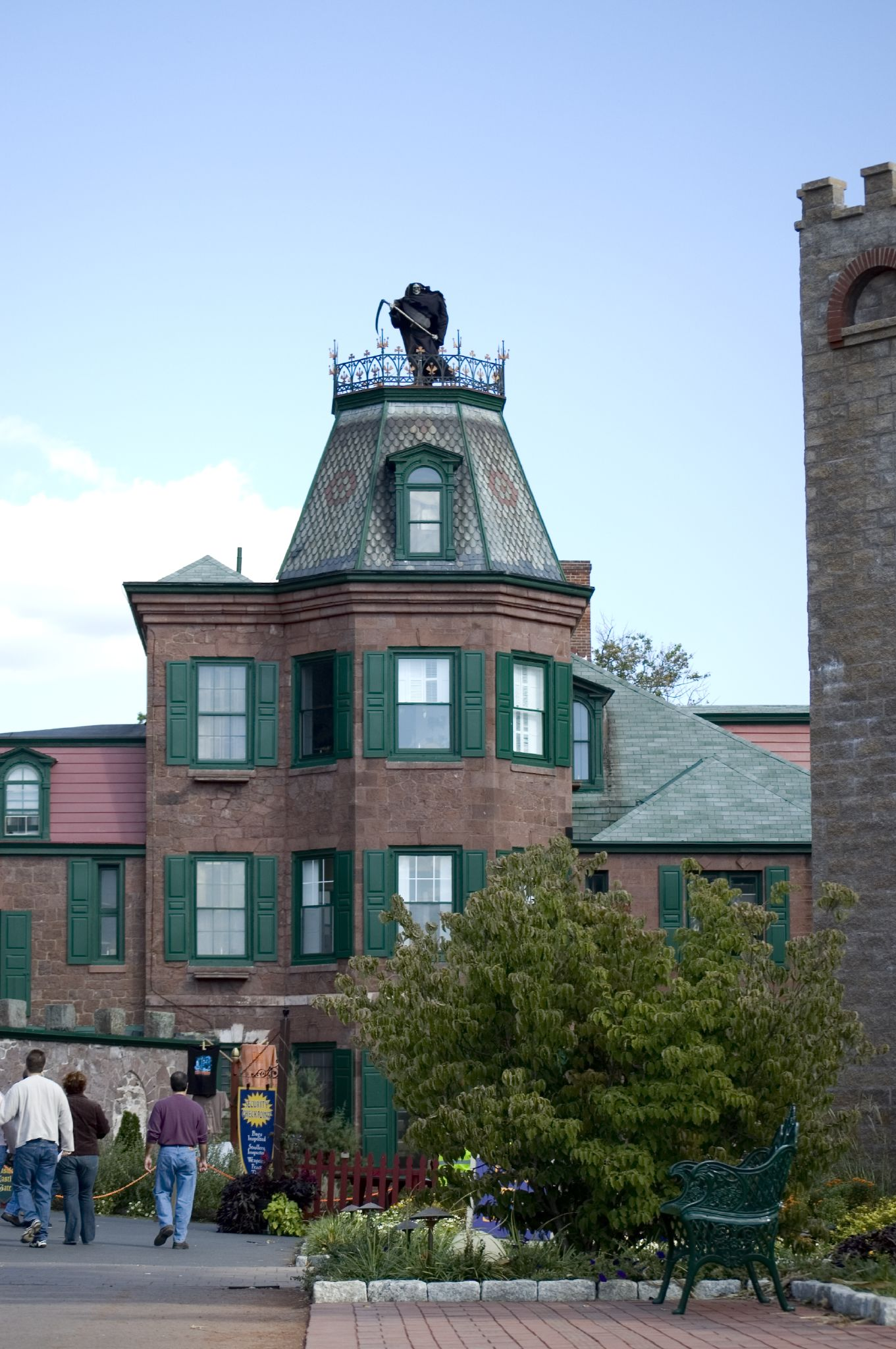
Mount Hope Estate Mansion is an 1805 Federal-style house with significant 1895 Victorian additions.

Mount Hope Estate was the headquarters of the Grubb Family iron manufacturing operations during the 19th Century.

=== Rebirth (third generation, 1800–30) ===
Henry Bates Grubb, building on his father's legacy, founded the 19th-century Grubb family iron empire.

Henry was the youngest of Peter Jr.'s two sons who inherited their father's estate in 1786, well before they came of age. The estate included 3,741 acres of iron-rich Cornwall land, 2/3 interest in the Hopewell Forges, plus 221 acres and their father's new furnace at Mount Hope. Henry, unlike his older brother Alan, was quite interested in the iron business and had several competent advisers whom the brothers had selected as guardians of their estate. He purchased his brother's share in 1798, to be paid over time, and began to rebuild the business, apparently with the cooperation of Robert Coleman. Henry was barely seventeen when he began a series of transactions to rebuild the family iron business, acquiring several properties. The combined operations grew to become one of the largest iron producers in Pennsylvania during the 19th century.

- In 1798 Henry purchased his brother Alan's share of the inheritance, to be paid over time. Shortly thereafter he financed his rebuilding plans with the sale of a half interest in his properties to Robert Coleman.

- In 1800 Henry built the Mount Vernon Furnace at Conewago Creek, on 4,000 acres in Lancaster County. He also purchased the Hellam Iron Works in York County and renamed it the Codorus Forge.

- In 1802, Henry agreed to the partition of the common holdings between himself and Coleman, in order to obtain additional funds to pay off his brother. Coleman received Henry's interest in the Hopewell Forges and another 1/6 interest in the Cornwall ore banks, while Henry retained a 1/6 interest in the ore banks to supply his Mount Hope furnace which he now fully owned.

- In 1803 Henry purchased 2,500 acres on Manada Creek in Dauphin County on which his sons later built a furnace.

- In 1800 - 1805, Henry built the 12 room formal Federal-style mansion at Mount Hope Estate, including the extensive formal gardens. Mount Hope Estate was the headquarters of the new Grubb family iron empire and at one time comprised nearly 30 structures surrounded by a wall, all constructed of locally quarried red sandstone.

Henry's holdings grew to include at least three iron manufacturing operations, over 6,500 acres of land and a 1/6 interest in the Cornwall ore banks, all managed from Mount Hope. He died in 1823, leaving his widow Harriet Amelia Buckley Grubb to oversee the operations until their sons began to come of age in 1830.

=== Peak production years (fourth generation, 1840–75) ===
Henry's three sons (Edward Burd Grubb, Clement Brooke Grubb and Alfred Bates Grubb) took over the family business when they came of age beginning in 1830. They greatly expanded the family's operations to become Pennsylvania's leading iron producers from 1840 to 1870, with their headquarters at Mount Hope Estate.

Edward was sent to Europe in 1830 to study the latest iron technology, apparently a worthwhile family investment in the future growth of the business. In 1833 Edward and Clement assumed control of the business under the name E. & C.B. Alfred's involvement probably began when he came of age in 1839.

Clement apparently decided to strike out on his own, as he resigned from E. & C.B in 1845 and sold his half interest in the Mount Hope Estate to his younger brother Alfred for $25,000. He moved to Lancaster, where he built a large Greek Revival mansion that is now the Lancaster Museum of Art. About the same time Edward removed with his family to Burlington, NJ, where he became a prominent citizen of that area.

Alfred was left to manage the Mount Hope Estate and Furnace, in partnership with Edward and his heirs, which he continued until at least 1873. After his death in 1885, the Mount Hope Estate was sold back to Clement for $300,000.

Clement acquired several operations at other locations, including two newer-technology anthracite furnaces near Columbia, PA, along the Susquehanna River.

- 1851 - Clement, having acquired the Chestnut Hill Ore Bank, incorporated the Chestnut Hill Iron Ore Company.

- 1854 - Clement bought the Henry Clay (anthracite) furnace and renamed it the St. Charles Furnace. It was later renamed St. Charles Furnace #2.

- 1866 - Iron ore was discovered at Clement's Codorus property. "Grubb's Bank" supplied iron ore to the St. Charles Furnace.

- 1872 - Clement formed a partnership, C.B. Grubb & Son, with his son Charles Brooke Grubb to run the St. Charles Furnace.

- 1875 - C.B. Grubb & Son built a new anthracite furnace named St. Charles Furnace #1 (the existing Henry Clay / St. Charles Furnace was renamed St. Charles #2).

Edward and his sons were also active in the iron business during this period. E. Burd entered the business after his Civil War service, and C. Ross entered into a relationship with the Haldeman iron manufacturing family.

- 1865 - Edward decided to build a new furnace, probably as a legacy to his sons, and founded the Lebanon Valley Furnace Company.

- 1867 - Edward completed the Lebanon Valley Furnace, a modern anthracite- and coke-fired furnace.

- 1867 - Edward's eldest son, Gen. E. Burd Grubb, joined the business after his Civil War service and succeeded his father as President of the Lebanon Valley Furnace Company, that had built and owned the Lebanon Valley Furnace.

- 1869 - Edward's youngest son, C. Ross Grubb, purchased the Eagle Furnace, which was later renamed Chickies Furnace #2. This began a series of business relationships with the prominent Haldeman industrial family.

=== Post-Civil War years (fifth generation, 1870–1900) ===
Grubb family members owned and/or operated eleven iron manufacturing operations after the Civil War, when iron was in great demand to meet the needs of an expanding country. Old plants were acquired or upgraded and a new one was built. The Cornwall ore banks continued to supply large quantities of ore to both the iron and newer steel industries. But the expansion of ironworks proved to be short-lived, as the transition to steel production was on the horizon.

- The Codorus Iron Mine (Grubb's Bank) was mined from 1866 to 1874 under C. B. Grubb and Son.

- The Manada Furnace (charcoal) continued in production under the Grubb family until 1875.

- The Mount Hope Furnace (charcoal) continued in production under Alfred Bates Grubb until his death in 1885.

- The Conewago Furnace (anthracite) was upgraded in 1879 and continued in production under the Conewago Iron Company until 1888.

- The two St. Charles Furnaces (anthracite), one acquired in 1875, continued in production under C.B. Grubb & Son until 1886 & 1889.

- The Joanna Furnace (charcoal) was technologically upgraded in 1889 and continued in production under Clement's son-in-law L. Heber Smith until his death in 1898.

- The two Chickies Furnaces (anthracite), acquired in 1868 and 1888, continued in production under Haldeman, Grubb & Company until 1899.

- The Chestnut Hill Ore Bank continued to be mined under Charles Brooke Grubb until 1907.

- The Lebanon Valley Furnace (anthracite & coke), built in 1867, continued in production under Gen. E. Burd Grubb, who probably retired in 1911.

=== End of a dynasty (1898–1911) ===
The charcoal- and anthracite-based iron manufacturing business rather quickly succumbed to newer technology and the transition to the steel industry that located further west. The ten Grubb family furnaces and mines listed above were shut down over just a 25-year period. Daisy Grubb sold some of her inherited industrial holdings and C. Ross Grubb, as President of the Cornwall Ore Bank Company, sold the Cornwall Iron Mines, both in 1902, to the Pennsylvania Steel Company (later acquired by Bethlehem Steel Company in February, 1916). E. Burd Grubb continued to operate the Lebanon Valley Furnace until about 1911. The dispositions of the other Grubb properties have not been determined, but may have also been acquired by Pennsylvania Steel.

The final fifth-generation members of the Grubb Family Iron Dynasty generally went into well-funded retirements. Of Clement's heirs, Charles Brooke Grubb died a batchelor at his Lancaster home in 1911; Ella Jane (Grubb) Smith died in 1920; Daisy Grubb renovated the Mount Hope Estate and may have died there in 1936. Of Edward Burd Grubb's heirs, Gen. E. Burd Grubb ran unsuccessfully for Congress in 1908, lost his fortune in a bad investment, and died in Newark in 1913; Henry Bates Grubb died in Burlington in 1919; C. Ross Grubb owned a chateau in Normandy, a villa on the Riviera, and an estate at Manada where he died in 1928. Sixth-generation Parker Ross Grubb died at 45 while golfing in Switzerland in 1920.

The Cornwall Iron Mines, that had been the source of the family's wealth, continued in production under Bethlehem Steel until operations were ended by a 1973 flood resulting from Hurricane Agnes; it had been mined continuously for 234 years.

== Daisy Grubb era (1890–1936) ==
Daisy Elizabeth Brooke Grubb was Clement Grubb's youngest child. Never married, she inherited holdings worth $6 million from her father in 1889 and became a wealthy Lancaster spinster and socialite who lived at Mount Hope Estate and at her father's mansion in downtown Lancaster; she also had a town home in Philadelphia. In 1902, she sold most of her inherited industrial holdings to Pennsylvania Steel Company. In 1895, she began renovating her 12-room Federal-style Mount Hope mansion, enlarging it into a 32-room Victorian mansion where she entertained extensively. She retained the formal gardens established by her grandfather. Grubb was the last family member to live at Mount Hope, where she may have died in 1936. The estate is now privately owned and is listed on the National Register of Historic Places. Her will left a trust fund to the Hope Episcopal Church, which was built by her grandmother, and the rest to descendants of her sisters.

== Properties and companies ==
The following properties were owned and operated over time by members of the Grubb family, or were closely associated with their operations. Presented in the approximate order of their appearance in the family dynasty. The early furnaces were charcoal-fired, and so were located on or near large tracts of hardwood forests that supplied the charcoal. Later furnaces (after about 1845) were fired by anthracite coal and/or coke, and were located near waterways or railroads that could transport the coal-based fuel mined elsewhere. Forges transformed the pig iron, produced by the furnaces, into final products.

=== Cornwall Iron Mines ===
The Cornwall Iron Mines in Lebanon County, also known as the Cornwall Ore Banks, were the foundation of the Grubb Family Iron Dynasty. Discovered by Peter Grubb, who had acquired 1,000 acres by 1737, they proved to be the largest domestic iron ore deposit east of Lake Superior, and were once the largest open pit iron mine in the world. The ore was primarily magnetite. While the majority interest in the mines were gradually acquired by Robert Coleman by 1803, the descendants of Peter Grubb, Jr. retained a 1/6 interest as tenants in common.

The Cornwall Ore Bank Company was formed in 1864 to operate the mines for the benefit of the owners - by then numbering 96! The company operated the mines until they were sold in 1902 to the Pennsylvania Steel Company, which was later acquired by the Bethlehem Steel Corporation) in February, 1916.

There was also an open pit mine sold to Bethlehem Steel by the Coleman heirs in 1919.

The mines produced high quality iron ore and other valuable minerals for 234 years, growing to over a million tons per year, until they were flooded by Hurricane Agnes and then closed permanently in 1973.

Lifespan = 1737–1973, 234 years; 1737–1902, 165 years full or partial ownership by Grubb family
Production = 776,000 tons by 1848, 358,000 tons/year in 1940, 1.1 million tons/year later.
Acreage = 1,000 acres in 1737. 10,261 acres in 1786 (6,520 owned by Curtis Grubb & Robert Coleman, 3,741 by Peter Grubb, Jr.'s heirs)

=== Cornwall Furnace ===
The Cornwall Furnace in Lebanon County was built by Peter Grubb in 1742 to process ore from his nearby Cornwall Iron Mines and supply pig iron to his Hopewell Forges. A cold blast charcoal fired furnace, it had a reported output capacity of 32 tons per week and supplied pig iron to six local and Philadelphia forges. After Cury & Co.'s 20-year lease expired about 1765, the furnace was jointly owned by Peter's sons Curtis and Peter Jr. Curtis, the majority partner, operated the furnace and Peter ran the Hopewell Forges. The brothers were enthusiastic Patriots and their iron works supplied cannon and other munitions to the Revolutionary War effort during their ownership, which ended with Curtis' death in 1789.

Curtis Grubb's heirs found themselves unable or unwilling to operate the business and in 1795 they sold their interests to Robert Coleman, who had already acquired a partial interest in the business and had been managing it for them. Coleman and his heirs operated Cornwall Furnace, with various improvements over the years, until it was closed down in 1883. It has been preserved in excellent condition and the property was deeded to the Commonwealth of Pennsylvania in 1932 by the Coleman heirs. Cornwall Furnace is now open to the public and is listed on the National Register of Historic Places.

Lifespan = 1742–1883, 141 years; 1742–1802, 60 years in Grubb family
Furnace type = Charcoal cold blast
Ore source = Cornwall Iron Mines
Production = 32 ton/wk (max 1,600 ton/year)
Acreage = 80 acres in 1744
Transportation = Wagons, Union Canal & N. Lebanon Plank Road (c1820-1886), Cornwall RR (1855 -)

=== Hopewell Forges ===
The Hopewell Forges (or Hopewell) on Hammer Creek (not to be confused with the Hopewell Furnace National Historic Site), were part of the original Grubb iron works, built by Peter Grubb (the elder) in 1742 to turn pig iron from Cornwall Furnace into final iron products. This historic iron manufacturing site is located near Hammer Creek in Lancaster County, Pennsylvania, United States (40.220°N 76.325°W). It is the site where Peter Grubb first began his iron making activities sometime around 1739, it is located approximately six miles southeast of Cornwall, Pennsylvania, which was founded by Grubb in 1737.

After 1765, Peter's sons Curtis and Peter Jr. assumed joint ownership of their father's holdings, including the forges. Peter Jr., the minority partner, lived nearby and operated the forges until his death in 1786. See "Hopewell Forge Mansion & Historic Marker".

The forges, however, became central to a Grubb family tragedy and other unintended consequences. In 1783, Curtis' son Peter III had been given an interest in the family iron works by his father as an advance inheritance. The courts then had to determine how best to partition the overall assets. Peter III was given a 1/6 interest in the ore fields and a 1/3 interest in the forges, making him partners with his uncle Peter. Neither were happy with the arrangement and in 1785 Peter III sold his share of the forges (and the ore fields) to Robert Coleman , who thus became Peter Jr.'s partner. Peter Jr. became even more concerned for his business situation, especially for the supply of pig iron from his brother's Cornwall Furnace, and decided to build his own furnace at Mount Hope. He went deeply into debt and the pressures of the situation led him to commit suicide at Hopewell in 1786.

These events related to the forges had another unintended consequence. As part of the sale to Coleman, Peter III reserved for himself and his heirs the perpetual right to remove sufficient ore from Cornwall Iron Mines to supply one furnace. This clause, particularly the definition of "one furnace," became an unsettled issue in the courts for nearly 100 years. See "Robesonia Iron Company" below.

Coleman acquired the remaining interest in the Hopewell Forges in 1802, from Henry Bates Grubb. The property was among those left by Coleman to his four sons upon his death in 1825. While it is unclear when Hopewell ceased operations, it produced 250 tons in 1833, but probably closed before 1854 when Coleman's Speedwell Forge, also on Hammer Creek, was shut down. There is little left of the forges today except a few remnants of the dams at the creek, but Peter Grubb's mansion and historic marker can still be seen on present-day Route 322.

Lifespan = 1742 – c. 1850, 108 years; 1742–1802, 60 years in Grubb family
Pig iron source = Cornwall Furnace
Production = 250 ton/year in 1833
Acreage = n/a

=== Union Forge ===
Union Forge was constructed by Curtis Grubb about 1782, near present-day Jonestown, PA, about 12 miles north of Cornwall Furnace. Curtis built the forge to process pig iron from Cornwall Furnace. Included were 1,000 acres of land, blacksmith and carpenter shops, a grist mill, and several houses. The forge continued in operation, under various owners, until 1868, when rolling mills had begun to displace forges as refiners of iron. Union Forge was initially held in common with the rest of the ironworks, and was included in the 1786 partition of the Grubb properties. While unclear, it probably remained a Curtis Grubb operation until his heirs sold to Robert Coleman in 1895. The "Union Forge Historic Marker". has been placed at the site of the forge.

Lifespan = 1782–1868, 86 years; 1782–1795, 13 years in Grubb family
Pig iron source = Cornwall Furnace
Production = Not determined
Acreage = 1,000

=== Mount Hope Furnace ===
The charcoal-fired Mount Hope Furnace was built in 1785 by Peter Grubb, Jr., on 212 acres of land he purchased from Jacob Graybill in 1784, in Manheim Township about five miles north of Lancaster. There was already an operating gristmill on the property. Peter went deeply into debt to build the furnace because he feared for the future supply of pig iron for his Hopewell Forges from his brother's Cornwall Furnace, in which Peter had only a minority interest. Peter yielded to the business pressures he found himself under and took his own life at Hopewell in 1786. His sons Alan Burd Grubb and Henry Bates Grubb inherited the furnace, which became a core asset of the future Grubb iron business. The furnace produced 1,000 tons of pig iron in 1833. The furnace was upgraded to hot blast and apparently continued in operation until at least 1885, when it was sold by Alfred Bates Grubb's estate, along with nearly 2,500 acres of land (the Mount Hope Estate), back to his brother Clement Brooke Grubb (who had sold his share to Alfred in 1845) for $300,000.

Lifespan = 1785 – c. 1885, 100 years, all in Grubb family
Furnace type = Charcoal cold blast
Ore source = Cornwall Iron Mines
Production = 1,000 ton/year in 1833
Acreage = 212 in 1785; 2,500 in 1885

=== Mount Hope Estate ===
The Mount Hope Estate was the enclave near Manheim that was home and headquarters of the Grubb family iron enterprises after 1800. It grew from Peter Grubb Jr.'s original 212 acres in 1786, home to the Mount Hope Furnace and gristmill, to over 2,500 acres and many buildings by 1885. The original Federal style mansion was built by Peter's son, Henry Bates Grubb, between 1800 and 1805; it was the most formal ironmaster's mansion in the area up to 1850, and featured formal gardens that are still maintained. The enclave at its peak contained nearly 30 outbuildings (including the Hope Church, built in 1848-9), most constructed of locally quarried red sandstone and enclosed by a wall of the same material.

Henry B. Grubb, who had inherited Mount Hope from his father at age 12, passed it on to his two older sons, Edward Burd Grubb and Clement Brooke Grubb, upon his death in 1823. The Estate was managed by Henry's widow, Harriet Amelia Buckley Grubb, until the sons came of age. The brothers partnered to operate the business in 1833, under the name E. & C.B. In 1845 Clement sold his half interest to their younger brother Alfred Bates Grubb for $25,000. After Alfred's death in 1885, his heirs sold Mount Hope Estate back to Clement for $300,000, in the most expensive real estate transaction in Lancaster up to that time.

The last family member to live at Mount Hope was Clement's daughter Daisy Elizabeth Brooke Grubb, who inherited it from her father along with holdings worth six million dollars. In 1895 she began an extensive renovation and transformed the original 12-room structure into a 32-room Victorian mansion where she entertained many distinguished guests. Daisy lived at Mount Hope at least part of the time until she died in 1936.

The property was subdivided and mostly sold off by the subsequent owners, but the mansion and some surrounding land was bought by Charles Romito for a winery in 1980 and is listed on the National Register of Historic Places.

Lifespan = c1805-1936, 131 years in Grubb family, mansion still in use
Production = N/A
Acreage = 2,500 (including furnace) in 1885

=== Mount Vernon Furnaces and Forge ===
The Mount Vernon Furnace was the first furnace built by Henry Bates Grubb, in 1800 by most references. A charcoal-fired furnace, it was located near Elizabethtown on Conewago Creek, about 15 miles southwest of Mount Hope. It produced 50 tons of pig iron per week (2,500 tons per year) from Cornwall ore. The property was expanded to over 4,000 acres, and there were also a forge, a gristmill, and a sawmill. After Henry's death in 1823, the operations were continued by his sons Edward Burd Grubb and Charles Bates Grubb, and Edward built a second furnace by the same name in 1831. The iron furnaces fell out of production and were abandoned in 1852.

The sawmill is still in operation today and the gristmill carried on until 1913. The gristmill was still owned by Grubb & Company in 1875. Its ruins can be seen on the property of the beautiful and historic Conewago Manor Inn and the sawmill can be seen nearby. The original inn was built by Samuel Smith sometime after 1739; Henry Bates Grubb added the majestic stonework structure in 1811 and named it Mount Vernon Estate.

The Grubb's Mount Vernon Furnace is not to be confused with the similarly named furnace in Fayette County in western Pennsylvania.

Lifespan = 1800–1852, 52 years, all in Grubb family
Furnace type = Two charcoal cold blast
Ore source = Cornwall Iron Mines
Production = 50 ton/wk (max 2,500 ton/year)
Acreage = 4,000

=== Codorus Forge and Furnace ===
The Codorus Forge was the new name given to the Hellam Forge that Henry Bates Grubb bought from Thomas Neill in 1802. The forge was located in York County, near the intersection of Codorus Creek with the Susquehanna River, about 30 miles southwest of Mount Hope.

The forge, which had passed through several owners, was originally built around 1765 by William Bennett on 150 acres obtained from William Penn. The forge processed pig iron produced at nearby Mary Ann Furnace, and had supplied cannon and shot to the Continental Army, probably under the ownership of James Smith, a signer of the Declaration of Independence.

Henry Grubb operated the forge until he hired John Shippen, who managed it from 1818 until 1825. Henry's widow, Harriet Amelia Buckley Grubb, oversaw its operation until their oldest sons, Edward Burd Grubb and Clement Brooke Grubb, came of age. The sons inherited the forge and began operating it in 1833 under their partnership E. & C.B. They added the "Codorus Furnace". 13 October 2006. about 1837, transporting ore from their Chestnut Hills Mines by flat boat across the Susquehanna River. The iron products were shipped downriver to Philadelphia and Baltimore. The furnace and forge were closed sometime in the 1850s.

An iron ore deposit, known as Grubb's Bank (see below), was discovered on the Codorus property in 1866, well after the forge and furnace were closed down. The ore was shipped by river to the St. Charles Furnace in Columbia.

Lifespan = 1765 – c. 1855, 90 years; 1802 – c. 1855, 53 years in Grubb family
Furnace type = Charcoal cold blast
Ore source = Chestnut Hills Mines
Production = 400 tons/year (forge)
Acreage = 150

=== Manada Furnace ===
In 1803 Henry Bates Grubb purchased land from Gen. Timothy Green, on Manada Creek in the northwest part of East Hanover Township in Dauphin County, about 60 miles east of Mount Hope. Manada Furnace was built in 1836 by Henry's sons Clement B. & Edward B. Grubb, at Sand Beach near the site of the old Manada Fort. Embracing some 2,500 acres, Manada Furnace was the only charcoal furnace in Dauphin County in 1856, a year after the brothers' partnership ended.

The ore came from the Grubb's Chestnut Hill mine or from the Cornwall mines via the Union Canal to Lebanon. From there it was brought by wagon to the furnace. Water power from Manada Creek turned a wheel which operated the bellows that pumped air into the furnace. The water wheel was probably on the northeast corner of the furnace. A bridge from a hill led to the top of the furnace. Men dumped wheelbarrow loads of charcoal, limestone and iron ore into the top. The furnace produced pig iron and also did some casting of products. From 1837 to 1848 the furnace produced over 22,000 tons of iron. The metal was sent to the Swatara railroad station for transport.

The community surrounding the furnace consisted of a general store, the iron master's house, a smoke house, boarding house, and twenty two log cabins. The church is still in existence as the United Christian Episcopal Manada Furnace Church. At the peak of operations, the furnace employed 75 men. Two hundred acres were used for farming for the families of furnace workers. In September 1861 the furnace workers formed the 46th Regiment, D Company to fight in the Civil War. The company was disbanded on July 16, 1865. During the Civil War, the owners of Manada Furnace were able to use Confederate prisoners from Camp Curtin to work as woodcutters and laborers. Many are buried at "Manada Confederate Graveyard".

Manada Furnace was closed in 1875.

Lifespan = 1836–1875, 39 years, all in Grubb family
Furnace type = Charcoal hot blast
Ore source = Cornwall Iron Mines and/or Chestnut Hill Mines
Production = 2,000 ton/year (1837–1848)
Acreage = 2,500

=== E. & C.B. ===
A partnership formed in 1833 by Henry's sons Edward Burd Grubb and Clement Brooke Grubb to run the family business from Mount Hope Estate. The partnership continued until 1845 when Clement sold his share to his younger brother Alfred Bates Grubb. By then, Edward had removed to Burlington, NJ and Clement to Lancaster, PA. The companies and properties listed below involved only Clement and Edward and their heirs, as Alfred's did not join the family iron business.

=== E.B & A.B Grubb Company ===
A partnership formed in 1845 between Henry's sons Edward Burd Grubb, Sr. and Alfred Bates Grubb to manage Mt. Hope Estate and Furnace after their brother Clement ended his partnership with Edward. After Edward's death in 1867, Alfred carried on, with Edward's heirs, until 1873.

=== Chestnut Hill Ore Bank ===
The Chestnut Hill Ore Bank, acquired by Clement Brooke Grubb by 1851, was about eight miles west of Lancaster, at Silver Spring near Columbia. The several ore properties at Chestnut Hill, which adjoin each other, were, when taken as a whole, one of the largest hematite ore deposits in Pennsylvania. Ore was first discovered on the Greider farm, between 1825 and 1832, by the engineer Simeon Guilford. Most of the furnaces in and around Columbia and Chickies depended on these mines for their principal supply of ore.

The Grubb tract, about 13 acres, was developed by Jerome Boyer around 1839 and acquired and further developed by Clement Brooke Grubb sometime prior to 1851, when the Chestnut Hill Iron Ore Company was incorporated. Various tracts at Chestnut Hill were owned, in 1869, by Clement Brooke Grubb, heirs of his brother Edward Burd Grubb, Sr., the Chestnut Hill Iron Ore Company, the Silver Spring Iron Ore Company, and other owners of small outcroppings. In 1904, the property was owned by Clement's son, Charles Brooke Grubb. The ore bank supplied thousands of tons of iron ore to the Grubb's Codorus and Manada furnaces and to other nearby anthracite furnaces, such as the St. Charles Furnaces, until 1907.

The ore pit, about 13 acres and 110 feet deep, has since filled with water, creating "Lake Grubb"., part of a modern-day 54 acre recreational area in Silver Spring, Pennsylvania.

Lifespan = 1839 – c. 1907, 68 years; 1851–1907, 56 years in Grubb family
Production = Estimated 20,000 tons/year 1832–1876
Acreage = 13

=== Columbia Furnace ===
The Grubb Family Papers, 1814–1869, mention a Columbia Furnace 1853 - 1860. These sources have not been reviewed and no other references to a furnace by that name have been found. They likely relate to the Grubb-owned St. Charles Furnace in Columbia.

=== St. Charles Furnace #1 ===
Clement Brooke Grubb built the "St. Charles Furnace". in 1854, at Columbia near the Susquehanna River about 12 miles west of Lancaster, on the Pennsylvania Railroad. Years later, in 1875, Grubb and his son Charles bought the Henry Clay Furnace, about a mile upriver, and renamed it St. Charles No. 2. Both furnaces were fired by anthracite coal. Together, these two furnaces had an annual capacity of over 20,000 tons of pig iron, which was well known for its quality for boiler plate, bars, nails and foundry work. In 1863 Grubb built a large iron ore roaster, the first of its kind in Lancaster County, to remove sulfur from the local ores used in the furnaces. The St Charles Furnace was remodeled in 1879–80, but only six years later in 1886 it went out of blast for the last time. It was dismantled in 1897; some remains can be seen from the Route 30 bridge.

Lifespan = 1854 – c. 1886, 32 years, all in Grubb family
Furnace type = Anthracite hot blast
Ore source = Local ore & Codorus Iron Mine
Production = Estimated 10,000 ton/year
Acreage = N/A
Transportation = Pennsylvania Canal, Pennsylvania RR

=== C.B Grubb and Son ===
C.B. Grubb and Son was a partnership formed about 1872 between Clement Brooke Grubb and his son Charles Brooke Grubb. It presumably endured until Clement's death in 1889. The partnership owned both St. Charles Furnaces and the Codorus Iron Mine, also known as Grubb's Bank. They likely also had an interest in the Chestnut Hill Ore Banks, since they were owned by Charles in 1904.

=== Henry Clay Furnace (St. Charles Furnace #2) ===
In 1875 C.B. Grubb and Son (Clement and Charles) bought the "Henry Clay Furnace"., located about a mile up the Susquehanna River from Clement's St. Charles Furnace, on the Pennsylvania Canal and the Pennsylvania Railroad. They renamed it St. Charles No. 2.

The Henry Clay furnace was one of the first of the anthracite-fired furnaces along the Susquehanna between Columbia and Marietta. It was built in 1845 by Peter Haldeman, but changed hands several times after 1855, producing only sporadically until 1865 when, after a long period of idleness it was blown in again under the proprietorship of the firm Denney and Hess. In 1875 Clement and Charles purchased and renamed it St. Charles Furnace No. 2. Together, the two St. Charles furnaces had an annual capacity of over 20,000 tons of pig iron. The furnace was remodeled in 1879, 1880 and again in 1887, but its production declined and it was abandoned in 1889. Ruins of the onsite tenement building can still be seen today.

Lifespan = 1845 – c. 1889, 44 years; 1875–1889, 14 years in Grubb family
Furnace type = Anthracite hot blast
Ore source = Local ore & Codorus Iron Mine
Production = Estimated 10,000 ton/year
Acreage = N/A
Transportation = Pennsylvania Canal (1845 -), Pennsylvania RR (1850 -)

=== Codorus Iron Mine (Grubb's Bank) ===
The Codorus Iron Mine, better known in later years as Grubb's Bank, was discovered on the Codorus property in 1866. The owner in 1874 was C. B. Grubb and Son. Since the Codorus Furnace was by then shut down, the ore was hauled to the Susquehanna River and floated to the St. Charles Furnaces in Columbia. The mine, less than an acre in size, contained ore consisting of a mixture of magnetite and hematite in sandstone. About 25,000 tons were removed by 1874, with seven men typically working to take about 25 tons per day.

Lifespan = 1866 – c. 1874, 8 years, all in Grubb family
Production = Estimated 3,000 ton/year
Acreage = One
Transportation = Susquehanna River

=== Grubb & Haldeman companies ===
The Haldeman family were prominent iron manufacturers in the Chickies area in Lancaster County. The Grubbs and Haldemans formed several business relationships, beginning in 1869, to own and operate three anthracite furnaces.

In 1869, heirs of Edward B. Grubb Sr. joined the firm of E. Haldeman & Company, after its founder retired. Those heirs apparently were Henry Bates Grubb and his brother C. Ross Grubb, both of whom became officers in other Grubb/Haldeman companies. C. Ross Grubb had purchased the Eagle Furnace, and the Chickies Iron Company was formed in 1876.

By 1882, Paris Haldeman, Henry Bates Grubb, and Horace Haldeman had formed the Conewago Iron Company, owners of the Conewago Furnace in Dauphin County. This relationship continued until at least 1892, by which time C. Ross Grubb had succeeded Paris Haldeman as President. The furnace under their ownership supplied the Chickies Iron Company exclusively, but went out of blast in 1888.

In 1888, the firm of Haldeman, Grubb & Company was formed as a partnership, between Paris Haldeman, C. Ross Grubb, and Horace L. Haldeman. Horace was the managing partner, and Paris retired in 1891. The firm owned Chickies Furnace #1 (formerly the Chickies Furnace, that had been built and owned by the Haldemans) and Chickies Furnace #2 (previously the Eagle Furnace, that had been acquired by Grubb in 1869).

=== Eagle Furnace (Chickies Furnace #2) ===
The anthracite-fired "Eagle Furnace". (later renamed Chickies Furnace #2), was built in 1854 on the floodplain between Marietta and Columbia just north of Chickies Creek by Stephen Eagle. Eagle operated the furnace until 1869, when it was purchased by C. Ross Grubb, son and heir of Edward Burd Grubb, Sr. and brother of E. Burd Grubb, Jr. He later became associated with E. Haldeman and Company, who owned and operated the Chickies Furnace. The Haldeman company managed the furnace, remodeled it several times and changed the name to Chickies #2. Haldeman, Grubb & Co. was formed in 1888 to take ownership of Chickies #2 and the nearby Chickies #1. The principal ores used at both Chickies furnaces were obtained from the Grubb and Haldeman's Chestnut Hill ore mines at Silver Springs, some six miles from the furnaces, and from Cornwall, Lebanon County. In the late 1880s the furnace was extensively rebuilt, a two-story engine house was added, and the furnace operated successfully until it was shut down in 1899. Remnants of the furnace, including the still-occupied engine house, can be seen today.

Lifespan = 1854 – c. 1899, 45 years; 1869–1899, 30 years in Grubb family
Furnace type = Anthracite hot blast
Ore source = Chestnut Hill & Cornwall Iron Mines
Production = Not determined
Acreage = N/A
Transportation = Rail

=== Conewago Furnace ===
The Conewago Furnace, formerly the Middletown Furnace, was in Middletown, Dauphin County. The furnace, built in 1853 and rebuilt in 1879, was owned in 1882 by the Conewago Iron Company, a Grubb and Haldeman partnership. Paris Haldeman was President, Henry Bates Grubb was Vice-President, and Horace Haldeman was Treasurer. It was fueled by anthracite and coke, and the ores were from Cornwall and Chestnut Hill. The product was "Chickies" pig iron, made exclusively by contract for the Chickies Iron Company. The Conewago Furnace went out of blast in 1888.

Lifespan = 1853–1888, 35 years; c1882-1888, c6 years in Grubb family
Furnace type = Anthracite and coke hot blast
Ore source = Chestnut Hill & Cornwall Iron Mines
Production = Not determined
Acreage = N/A

=== Chickies Furnace (Chickies Furnace #1) ===
Henry Haldeman built the first "Chickies Furnace". near the base of Chickies Rock, in Lancaster County, in 1845. Haldeman's sons Edwin and Samuel took over his business holdings later that same year and brought the anthracite-fired furnace into blast in 1846. The furnace was rarely out of blast and with several remodellings to implement technological advancements, it produced 17,000 tons of pig iron per year by the late 19th century. In 1888, Paris and Horace Haldeman partnered with C. Ross Grubb, who owned the nearby Eagle Furnace, to form Haldeman, Grubb and Company. They renamed the furnace Chickies #1 and renamed Eagle Furnace Chickies #2; operating both furnaces until they were shut down in 1899. The principal ores used at the Chickies furnaces were obtained from the Grubb and Haldeman's Chestnut Hill ore mines at Silver Springs, some six miles from the furnaces, and from Cornwall, Lebanon County.

Lifespan = 1845 – c. 1899, 54 years; 1888–1889, 11 years in Grubb family
Furnace type = Anthracite hot blast
Ore source = Chestnut Hill & Cornwall Iron Mines
Production = 17,000 ton/year
Acreage = N/A
Transportation = Rail

=== Lebanon Valley Furnace Company ===
The Lebanon Valley Furnace Company was formed in 1865 by Edward Burd Grubb, Sr. as the first president. His eldest son, Gen. E. Burd Grubb, Jr., became president after his father's death in 1867. In 1902 the company formally acquired, from Gen. Grubb, both the Lebanon Valley Furnace and his interest in the Cornwall Iron Mines. The company still owned and operated the furnace in 1907.

E. Burd Grubb may have been the last Grubb family member to retire from the iron business, probably in 1911 when he lost his fortune in a bad investment.

=== Lebanon Valley Furnace ===
The Lebanon Valley Furnace, in Lebanon, PA, was built in 1865-7, probably by the Lebanon Valley Furnace Company, who formally acquired it from Gen. E. Burd Grubb in 1902. Gen. E. Burd Grubb had become the owner when his father died, shortly before the furnace was blown for the first time in 1867. The furnace was a modern anthracite- and coke-fired furnace that was remodeled in 1884 and rebuilt in 1904, producing an output of pig iron, under the "Lebanon Valley" brand, of 24,000 tons per year. It was still active in 1907 and most likely continued under Grubb's control until 1911.

Lifespan = 1867-unk; 1867 – c. 1911, 44 years in Grubb family
Furnace type = Anthracite and coke, hot blast
Ore source = Cornwall Iron Mines
Production = Estimated 24,000 ton/year
Acreage = N/A
Transportation = Probably rail

=== Cornwall Ore Bank Company ===
The Grubbs were minority partners in the Cornwall Ore Bank Company, as they continued to hold a 1/6 interest in the ore banks. The company was formed in 1864 to operate the Cornwall mines for the benefit of the owners - by then numbering 96 tenants in common! The company operated the mines until they were sold in 1902 to the Pennsylvania Steel Company, which was itself acquired by the Bethlehem Steel Corporation in February, 1916. The President of the Cornwall Ore Bank Company when the mines were sold was C. Ross Grubb, representing the Grubb family's fifth generation in the iron business.

=== Joanna Furnace ===
While not formally a Grubb property, the charcoal-fired "Joanna Furnace". was owned by Clement Grubb's son-in-law, L. Heber Smith, a Civil War Colonel who married Clement's daughter Ella Jane Brooke Grubb in 1868. Located in Berks County, the furnace was built in 1792 and named for Joanna Potts, wife of the principal owner. It passed through several hands before Smith took ownership, probably after the war and before his marriage to Ella Jane. It is not unreasonable to assume that the Grubbs assisted with the furnace's major technological upgrade in 1889, especially since Ella Jane would have been an heiress to her father's sizable estate that year. The furnace continued in operation under Smith until it was "blown out" after his death in 1898 at the age of 61. The furnace was acquired by Bethlehem Steel, who deeded it to the Hay Creek Valley Historical Association in 1979; the ruins have been enhanced by local historians and are open to visitors.

Lifespan = 1792–1898, 106 years; 1868–1898, 30 years in Smith/Grubb family
Furnace type = Charcoal cold blast
Ore source = Jones Mine
Production = Not determined
Acreage = Not determined

=== Robesonia Iron Company ===
While the Robesonia Iron Company, owners of the "Robesonia Furnace". Archived from the original on 2011-07-25. at Robesonia in Berks County about 20 miles east of Cornwall, was not a Grubb property, it affected the affairs of the Grubbs and Colemans for most of the 19th century because it owned access rights to Cornwall iron ore.

After Curtis Grubb's oldest son Peter Grubb III received his inheritance in 1783, he sold his 1/3 interest in the Hopewell Forges to Robert Coleman. But as a condition of that sale Peter reserved for himself and his heirs the right of access to remove "for as long as grass grows and water flows" sufficient ore to supply "one furnace". Peter later, in 1883, sold his remaining share of the iron mines, along with these rights, to George Ege to supply his Reading Furnace in Berks County.

Henry P. Robeson acquired the operation in 1845 and with it the right to access Cornwall iron ore. Robeson replaced the charcoal-fired Reading Furnace with two (in 1848 and 1855) more modern and much larger Robesonia Anthracite Furnaces, while still demanding the right to access Cornwall iron ore – to supply one furnace, whichever one of the two was in operation, but not both at once. The combined capacity was many times greater than had been visualized in 1783. That right of access, especially with the interpretation of the quantities of ore permitted for "one furnace", was a highly contentious issue for years between Robeson and the Grubbs and Colemans, who jointly owned the ore banks as tenants in common. The issue languished in the courts for years and was not resolved until the state Supreme Court ruled in Robesonia's favor in 1880. As a result, in 1884, the company decided to market only one kind of pig iron called "Robesonia", made exclusively from Cornwall ore, which was consumed in large quantities.

In 1926, the Bethlehem Steel, owners of the Cornwall iron mines since 1916, acquired Robesonia. In order to protect the mines from the enormous amounts of ore being consumed, Bethlehem Steel elected to shut down the Robesonia furnaces in 1927.

Lifespan = 1848–1927, 79 years (anthracite furnaces)
Furnace type = Two anthracite hot blast furnaces
Ore source = Cornwall Iron Mines
Production = Grew from 52 ton/wk in 1848 to 240 ton/wk in 1854 to 1,000 ton/wk (52,000 ton/yr) in 1884
Acreage = 6-7,000
