= Peter Grubb Jr. =

American businessman (1740–1786)

- Born: September 8, 1740; Pennsylvania
- Died: January 17, 1786 (aged 45); Cornwall, Pennsylvania
- Occupations: Businessman & Ironmaster
- Known for: Co-owner of Cornwall Ironworks and operator of Hopewell Forges
- Title: Colonel, 8th Lancaster Battalion
- Spouse: Mary Shippen Burd (married 1771 - died 1774)
- Partner: Susan Brandelbury (c. 1768) Hannah Bellarby Grubb (1774)
- Children: three sons, one daughter
- Parent(s): Peter Grubb, Martha Bates
- Relatives: Curtis Grubb (brother), Nathaniel Grubb (uncle)

Peter Grubb Jr. (September 8, 1740 – January 17, 1786), Patriot and second son of Peter and Martha Bates Grubb, was a second-generation member of the Grubb Family Iron Dynasty along with his older brother Curtis Grubb. They operated the Cornwall Ironworks, making significant contributions to the American Revolutionary War effort.

The brothers inherited the ironworks from their father in 1754, with Peter, as the youngest, receiving only a one-third interest. They took over operation of the ironworks about 1765 and expanded it successfully. Peter, who had more ironmaking experience, took over the nearby Hopewell Forges, making bar iron from pig iron produced by Curtis at Cornwall Furnace. They operated the business through and after the Revolution, becoming quite prosperous until they died, Peter in 1786 and Curtis in 1789.

Most of the Cornwall Ironworks fell out of family hands during the period 1783 - 1802, to Robert Coleman who became Pennsylvania's first millionaire. But a portion remained with Peter Jr.'s heirs, who added to it to become major Pennsylvania producers of iron in the mid-19th century, operating out of Mount Hope Estate.

== Patriotism ==
The Grubb brothers were major contributors to the Revolutionary War effort, their Cornwall Ironworks supplied cannon, ammunition, shot and saltpans (used to make salt from seawater) to the Colonial forces. George Washington personally visited Cornwall to inspect the facility. Both brothers were elected as militia colonels, Peter's unit was the 8th Lancaster Battalion and Curtis' was the 2nd Lancaster Battalion, both assigned to the Flying Camp.

== Business career ==
Peter and his brother took over the operation of the ironworks about 1765, with Peter operating the Hopewell Forges and Curtis the Cornwall Furnace. They were successful operators of the ironworks through the Revolution. They were, however, complex individuals whose affairs were closely intertwined and became increasingly acrimonious. Their ongoing feuds and legal entanglements led to the fragmentation of the ironwork's ownership and its eventual loss by the Grubb family into the hands of Robert Coleman, who used it to build his fortune.

Tensions between the brothers reached the crisis point in 1783 when Curtis decided to marry his 20-year-old cousin Ann Grubb, granddaughter of the brothers' uncle Nathaniel Grubb. Inheritance concerns by Curtis' oldest son, Peter III (actually called Peter Jr. to distinguish him from Curtis' brother Peter), resulted in him being given a portion of Curtis' holdings, which then required a legal division of the assets that had previously been shared informally. Included in Peter III's newly acquired assets were a one-third interest in the Hopewell Forges. Peter, who had been running the forges, became fearful and reacted by purchasing land at Mount Hope to build his own furnace in competition with his brother, going heavily into debt. The feud intensified and Peter III became concerned for the business and sold his interest to Robert Coleman, a friend who had worked for the brothers and was by then also an ironmaster. Curtis, concerned with the competition, allied himself with Coleman and tried various tactics to put Peter out of business. Succumbing to the pressure, Peter became distraught and committed suicide in 1786, at age 45. The ironworks were apportioned by the courts among Curtis, Peter's estate, and Coleman.

Robert Coleman additionally acquired the Mount Hope furnace from Peter's estate. After Curtis' death in 1789 he operated the ironworks for the heirs until 1798, when they sold their interests to him. Thus Robert Coleman became the owner of most of the former Grubb holdings, which he added to his own and expanded to become Pennsylvania's first millionaire.

The holdings remaining in Peter's estate were eventually expanded upon by his second son Henry Bates Grubb, whose family went on to become one of Pennsylvania's largest iron producers in the mid-19th century, with their center of operations at Mount Hope Estate.

== Personal life ==
Before the brothers took over the ironworks in 1765, Peter had moved to the mansion built by his father and was learning the iron making business. He continued to reside in the mansion and took over operation of the Hopewell Forges. The Hopewell Forge Mansion still stands, denoted by a historic marker, on modern-day Route 322.

Peter married Mary Shippen Burd, of Lancaster, in 1771, at the Burd family estate known as "Tinian." They had two sons, Alan Burd Grubb and Henry Bates Grubb, but unfortunately Mary died from complications of childbirth. Peter never got over the loss, became despondent, and never married again. He was the less gregarious of the brothers, and being a minority partner in the ironworks probably didn't help his disposition. He developed an increasing drinking problem and was known for sometimes erratic behavior. On two occasions he was brought before Council to answer for statements he made while drinking; he was acquitted both times, as he had just "behaved in his usual mad way." Certainly Peter's drinking problem contributed to his suicide in 1786; he took his own life at the Hopewell Forges and was buried there by his brother-in-law Jasper Yeates.

Although Peter never married again, he did have a relationship with Hannah Bellarby Grubb, the adopted daughter of his uncle Samuel Grubb. Hannah came into Peter's household after Mary's death to help with the two infants. Peter and Hannah had a daughter, Hannah Elizabeth Grubb, late that same year. Peter acknowledged his daughter, later remembering her in his will, but did not marry Hannah. Hannah is believed to have then moved with her daughter to Curtis Grubb's household to help care for his two young children, whose mother had also died, probably in childbirth. Hannah later bore Curtis a son, Jehu Grubb. Peter also had a relationship with a Susan Brandelbury before he was married; a son was produced, Samuel Brandelbury, who was also remembered in Peter's will.

== Sons in the family iron business ==
With their remaining share of Peter's estate as a foundation, this family became one of the largest iron producers in Pennsylvania during the mid-19th century.

=== Son of Peter Grubb Jr. ===
- Henry Bates Grubb (1774–1823) was the family's first "real" ironmaster; he bought out his brother, Alan Burd Grubb, and built the original mansion at Mount Hope Estate.

=== Sons of Henry Bates Grubb ===
- Edward Burd Grubb Sr. (1810–1867) was a family ironmaster, an ardent abolitionist, and a leading citizen in Burlington, New Jersey.
- Clement Brooke Grubb (1815–1889) was a family ironmaster and banker, the first manager of Mount Hope Estate, and the owner of several iron production operations.
- Alfred Bates Grubb (1821–1885) was involved in the family iron business, bought 50% of Mount Hope Estate from Clement for $25,000, managing it until his death. His estate sold it back to Clement for $300,000.
