= Edward Burd Grubb Sr. =

- Born: December 17, 1810; Mount Hope, Pennsylvania, U.S.
- Died: August 27, 1867 (aged 56); Burlington, New Jersey, U.S.
- Occupation: Ironmaster
- Known for: Expanded Grubb Family Iron Dynasty at Mount Hope; ardent abolitionist
- Spouse: Euphemia Brown Parker (m.1837-d.1894)
- Children: four sons, two daughters
- Parent(s): Henry Bates Grubb, Harriet Buckley
- Relatives: Clement B. Grubb (brother), Alfred B. Grubb (brother)

Edward Burd Grubb Sr. (1810–1867) was a prominent fourth-generation member of the Grubb Family Iron Dynasty in Lancaster, Pennsylvania who in 1833, with his brother Clement Brooke Grubb, assumed control of the family business after the death of their father Henry Bates Grubb. Operating out of Mount Hope, they proceeded to rebuild the old furnaces and expand the operation to become one of the largest Pennsylvania iron producers during the mid-19th century. After 1840, Edward became a leading citizen of Burlington, New Jersey and an ardent abolitionist; his estate there is said to have been a station on the Underground Railroad and he was an active supporter of the Civil War effort.

== Business and professional life ==
Edward became involved in the family iron business about 1830, at the age of 20, when he was sent to Europe to study and learn the latest iron technology, such as the heating of blast for iron furnaces. In 1833 he and his brother Clement Brooke Grubb assumed control of the business under the name E. & C.B. They proceeded to rebuild the old furnaces and successfully expand the operation. Edward and Clement continued the partnership until about 1840, when Edward decided to leave active participation in the business, reportedly for health reasons, and moved with his bride to Burlington, New Jersey.

Edward became one of the most prominent citizens of Burlington, a member of the Episcopal Church, a trustee of Burlington College (Burlington, 1864–1877), a member of the Philadelphia Club, the Union League, and the Athenaeum of Philadelphia. He was an active supporter of the Civil War effort.

== Abolitionism ==
The Burlington Grubbs were known to have been ardent abolitionists, and Edward's estate there, known today as the Grubb Estate or Delaware House, is said to have been a station on the Underground Railroad. The underground passageways between the house and the Delaware River would have lent themselves to such use.

The local lore is somewhat distorted, as it commonly relates the abolitionist activity to descendants of Henry Grubb who settled in Burlington around 1680. However, none of the Burlington Grubbs after 1771 were descended from Henry, although John Grubb was a common ancestor. Henry was not Edward's grandfather and was never involved with the Grubb Estate purchased by Henry in 1840. None of this is to deny Edward's abolitionist fervor but is merely offered to clarify local lore.

== Personal life ==
Edward Burd Grubb Sr. was born at Mount Hope, Pennsylvania, on December 17, 1810, to Henry Bates and Harriet (Buckley) Grubb. On November 9, 1837, he married Euphemia Brown Parker, the daughter of Isaac Brown Parker of Carlisle, Pennsylvania. In 1840, reportedly because of health problems, he decided to leave active involvement in the family iron business and move with his bride to Burlington, New Jersey. He purchased an estate there, known today as the Grubb Estate or Delaware House, where they raised their family and lived out their lives. They had four sons Edward Burd Jr., Isaac Parker, Henry Bates, and Charles Ross, and two daughters Maria (died young) and Euphemia Parker. Euphemia married Count Demetrius de Cerkez of Rumania and was the last family member to live in Delaware House, which is today owned by the Catholic Charities, Trenton Diocese.

Edward died on August 27, 1867, at the age of 56, and his wife Euphemia in 1894 at the age of 79. They are interred at St. Mary's Episcopal Churchyard in Burlington.

== Notable descendants (sons) ==
- Edward Burd Grubb Jr. (1841–1913) was a Civil War General, a candidate for Governor, and later Ambassador to Spain. After the war, he joined the family iron business as President of the Lebanon Valley Furnace Company.
- Henry Bates Grubb (1848–1919) was Vice President of the Conewago Iron Company that owned the Conewago Furnace.
- Charles Ross Grubb (1851–1928) was a partner-owner of the Chickies iron furnaces, President of the Conewago Iron Company and President of the Cornwall Ore Bank Company.
