= Jehu Grubb =

American politician (c. 1781–1854)

- Born: c.1781 Cornwall, Pennsylvania, US
- Died: December 10, 1854; Stark County, Ohio, US
- Burial place: St. Jacobs Cemetery
- Other name: John Grubb
- Occupation: Farmer
- Known for: Ohio settler, JP, Ohio Legislature
- Title: Justice of Peace
- Spouses: Unknown (m. 1803; died 1814) Elizabeth Reber (m. 1815; died 1833) Elizabeth Harter Bair (m. 1833–1854)
- Children: Seven sons, five daughters
- Parent(s): Curtis Grubb, Hannah Bellarby Grubb
- Relatives: Henry Bates Grubb (cousin)

Jehu Grubb (a.k.a. John Grubb) (c. 1781 – 1854), unacknowledged son of the prominent ironmaster Curtis Grubb, was an early settler who became a leading citizen in Plain Township, Stark County, Ohio. Grubb served in the War of 1812, was a justice of the peace, served in the Ohio House of Representatives in 1828 and 1832, and in 1852 donated land for the Whitehall School. Grubb was often called John in various documents, and seems to have used both names himself. His stepson built the beautiful and historic Jacob H. Bair House on what been a corner of Grubb's farm.

== Military and public service ==
- Served in the War of 1812. He was drafted as a private into the Ohio militia in August 1812, where he served until his discharge at Lower Sandusky on February 24, 1813.
- Served as a justice of the peace in Stark County. His name appears in that capacity on marriage and other legal documents of his day.
- Served in the Ohio House of Representatives in 1828 and 1832, as a Democrat.

== History rewritten ==
Recent research has determined that Grubb was the unacknowledged son of the prominent and wealthy Patriot, Curtis Grubb, who with his brother Peter Grubb, Jr. owned and operated Pennsylvania's historical Cornwall Iron Mines and Cornwall Iron Furnace. Jehu Grubb was born to Curtis, a widower not yet married to his third wife, apparently by his housekeeper and cousin Hannah Bellarby Grubb. Jehu, along with Hannah, was basically disowned by his father, who did not mention him in his will. The true nature of the relationship was discovered when Jehu and his mother "Aunt Ann" were identified during a close examination of the 1790 will of Curtis' 17-year-old son and principal heir Curtis Jr. Jehu was left 50 pounds annually for his support and education, showing his connection to the family. Both Hannah and Curtis Jr. were buried next to Curtis, and her headstone proclaims her as his wife. Ironically, although Curtis Grubb fathered six "legitimate" children, all but one died without issue; his only documented modern descendants carrying the Grubb surname are through Jehu.

After Curtis Jr.'s early death, his heirs sold what was by then their half interest in the ironworks to Robert Coleman, in 1798. Over time, Coleman accumulated a 5/6 interest in the ironworks and went on to become Pennsylvania's first millionaire. The rest was retained by heirs of Curtis' brother Peter Jr., who build their own fortunes on it.

== Personal life ==
Grubb was a man who overcame a difficult beginning, as the unacknowledged son of a prominent Pennsylvania ironmaster, but became an early settler and respected leading citizen of Stark County, Ohio. He served in the War of 1812, as a justice of the peace, and twice in the Ohio House of Representatives. He was married three times and twice widowed, with eleven children of his own and an unknown number of stepchildren. His father's heirs did provide for his education, and that undoubtedly provided a foundation for a successful life.

In 1803 Grubb was on the tax rolls as a married landowner in Earl Township, Lancaster County, Pennsylvania, where he was a hackle (a flax or hemp combing implement) maker and farmer, having purchased 45 acres (180,000 m^{2}) of land from Henry Schultz. The 1810 census lists him with a wife and two sons in Earl Township. His wife was probably a daughter of John Swiggart of Lancaster, and one of the sons was named Curtis, after Jehu's father. They had a third son William in Pennsylvania just before moving to Stark County in May 1811.

In Ohio, Grubb first purchased a quarter section of patent land in Richland County, and another in what is now Summit County near Canal Fulton. These parcels were later sold, the first in 1815 and the second to Abraham Miller in 1833. In August 1812 Grubb was drafted as a private into the Ohio militia where he served during the War of 1812, until his discharge at Lower Sandusky on February 24, 1813. He subsequently purchased, on April 30, 1813, a third quarter section (Range 8, Twp. 11, Section 9, NE/4) in Plain Township, where he made his farm and lived out his life. In the 1850 census, his land was valued at $6,400, and in 1852 he donated a parcel to build the Whitehall School. There was also a cemetery, but the marked graves (only) were later moved for road widening. A corner of the Plain Twp. property was later acquired from Grubb's estate by his stepson and became the site of the beautiful and historic Jacob H. Bair House. Jacob was the son of Grubb's widow Elizabeth.

Grubb's first wife died, most likely while giving birth to their fourth son Simon Peter on March 6, 1814. On October 8, 1815, Grubb married Elizabeth Reber, apparently a widow with children. Her parentage is unclear, as different documents give her surname as Reber and Sorrick; families with both names lived in the area. Some evidence suggests she may have been related to Frederick Reber and widowed by John Sorrick, but no connections to either family have been verified. Grubb and Elizabeth Reber had five children before she died in 1833. On September 1, 1833, he married his third wife Elizabeth Harter Bair, the widow of Abraham Bair. She was already a mother of seven children, and she bore Grubb three more.

Grubb was, according to his widow, a man "six feet tall if not more, black hair and eyes, dark complexion." Although his father Curtis Grubb was of Cornish ancestry, Jehu resided in Pennsylvania and Ohio communities with large Pennsylvania Dutch populations, and he married women of those backgrounds. When Jehu donated the land for the school, he stipulated that there was to be "no preaching, except Dunkards and Lutherans" which, of course, were primarily German faiths. His son Simon's bible was in German, and his descendants spoke "dutch" well into the 1900s. Andrew Keplar conducted the marriage ceremony for Grubb and Elizabeth and it was humorously recorded for posterity at the time:

"You bromise to take this voman you holt by the hant to pe your vife, and that you thtick to her through hell-fire and dunder? Den I bronounce you man and voman, by cot Now, vers mine tollar?"

Grubb died on December 10, 1854, at the age of 73 and is buried at St Jacob's cemetery on State Street in North Canton. His widow Elizabeth Harter Bair Grubb lived until 1887 and is buried alongside. She is credited with much of the information known about Jehu, as a result of claims she filed for benefits due her from his service in the War of 1812. On June 4, 1984, the Canton Repository ran an article in 1984 based on an interview with Elizabeth 100 years before in 1884. She had been 91 years old at the time, and recalled coming to Ohio with her father George Harter in 1806, when "Canton Public Square contained only a clump of bushes with just three log cabins."
