= Edward Burd Grubb Jr. =

American Union Army colonel

28th United States Minister to Spain
- In office December 23, 1890 – May 26, 1892
- President: Benjamin Harrison
- Preceded by: Thomas W. Palmer
- Succeeded by: A. Loudon Snowden

Personal details
- Born: November 13, 1841 Burlington, New Jersey
- Died: July 7, 1913 (aged 71) Newark, New Jersey
- Resting place: Saint Mary's Episcopal Churchyard, Burlington, New Jersey
- Party: Republican
- Parent: Edward Burd Grubb Sr. (father)

Military service
- Allegiance: United States of America; Union
- Branch/service: United States Army; Union Army
- Rank: Colonel; Brevet Brigadier General
- Battles/wars: American Civil War

Edward Burd Grubb Jr. (known as E. Burd Grubb) (November 13, 1841 – July 7, 1913) was a Union Army colonel and regimental commander in the American Civil War. He served in three regiments and commanded two of them. In recognition of his service, in 1866, he was nominated and confirmed for appointment to the grade of brevet brigadier general of volunteers, to rank from March 13, 1865. He was later appointed by President Benjamin Harrison as United States Ambassador to Spain. He was also a noted foundryman, business owner and New Jersey politician who was close to Woodrow Wilson.

== Biography ==
Grubb was born in Burlington, New Jersey, to a fourth-generation member of the Grubb Family Iron Dynasty, Edward Burd Grubb Sr. and his wife Euphemia Parker. The Grubb family was descended from John Grubb who came from Cornwall, England and settled in Delaware in the early 1680s. He was educated at Burlington College, later named St. Mary's Hall-Doane Academy and graduated in 1860, just five months before Abraham Lincoln was elected as President.

=== War service ===
In May 1861, he enlisted in the 3rd New Jersey Volunteer Infantry. Commissioned as a first lieutenant, he would ultimately be promoted to captain and served as an aide to Brig. Gen. George W. Taylor during the 1862 Peninsula Campaign, where he contracted typhoid and was confined to a hospital ship shortly after the Battle of Malvern Hill. He would not rejoin the brigade until shortly before their successful assault on Crampton's Gap, during the lead-up to Battle of Antietam. The VI Corps (ACW) was mostly held in reserve during the battle, though Edward later wrote that his men were convinced they could have finished Lee's army if properly employed.

In November 1862, Grubb was promoted to major, and was transferred to the 23rd New Jersey Volunteer Infantry, a nine-month enlistment unit made up of men from his hometown of Burlington and various parts of Burlington County. In March 1863, despite his youth, he was promoted to colonel and commander of the regiment when its previous leader, Col. Henry O. Ryerson, left to take command of the 10th New Jersey Volunteer Infantry. He led his regiment, nicknamed "The Yahoos", as it participated in his brigade's assault on Confederate positions at Salem Church during the May 1863 Battle of Chancellorsville. Wounded in action, he was mustered out when his regiment's enlistment expired by law in June 1863.

After a year spent in recruitment and recruit training, Grubb was re-commissioned as colonel and appointed commander of the 37th New Jersey Volunteer Infantry, a 100-day enlistment unit. The new regiment then served in the trenches of Petersburg, Virginia, and in garrison duty until it was mustered out in October 1864. One night after arriving in the trenches, with few arms and little ammunition, the regiment came under fire and took some casualties. Their helplessness in this situation gave rise to the nickname they would bear in the New York Times, "Grubb's Game Chickens". His younger brother, Parker Grubb, serving as the 37th New Jersey's regimental adjutant, died of disease during the regiment's service.

In recognition of his service, on July 9, 1866, President Andrew Johnson nominated Grubb for appointment to the grade of brevet brigadier general of volunteers, to rank from March 13, 1865, for "gallant and meritorious services during the war" and the United States Senate confirmed the appointment on July 23, 1866.

=== Post war ===
After mustering out later in 1865, Grubb returned to Burlington and established himself as a prominent iron manufacturer, taking over the family's business that went back to his great-great-grandfather, Peter Grubb Jr. He was president of the Lebanon Valley Furnace Company from 1867 until about 1911. In 1868, he married Elizabeth Wadsworth Van Rensselaer (1848–1886), daughter of an important family in the area. Together they had one daughter. He was elected to the Burlington City Council where he served as its president for two years. He and his wife found time to travel extensively in Europe and accompanied Baron de Lesseps through the Suez Canal. His 1869 account of the canal and its technical aspects was the first such article to be published in the United States. In 1872, he had fellow veteran Frank Furness design a house on the river, still known as "Grubb Cottage". In 1874, he built a 12-acre (49,000 m^{2}) estate at Edgewater Park Township, New Jersey, called "Grassmere", where he annually entertained the survivors of the 23rd regiment.

In February 1874, Grubb was elected into the First Troop Philadelphia City Cavalry (an independent Company of the PA National Guard that had once been George Washington's personal bodyguard during the American Revolution). He was elected as the 16th Captain of the Troop, a position in which he served for 14 years with a break during his foray into politics. This period saw many critical reforms of the National Guard structure that helped ensure an effective mobilization and deployment for World War One. He resigned from the troop in 1896, but later regretted the decision and requested a commission as a colonel in the Expeditionary Force that went to Cuba in 1898.

Grubb was also a colonel in the New Jersey National Guard. His main contribution came during the 1881 centennial celebration of the Siege of Yorktown, where he commanded the New Jersey regiment that won a ceremonial silver cup for being the best drilled unit. He stayed active in veterans affairs, serving as New Jersey Department Commander of the Grand Army of the Republic, as well as hosting the annual reunions of his veterans.

Grubb was on a safari in Africa when his wife died in 1886. Upon his return, he proposed to his longtime friend, Harriet Hubbard Ayer, the noted woman's rights activist who made a fortune manufacturing beauty creams. However, she declined his proposal.

=== Political career ===
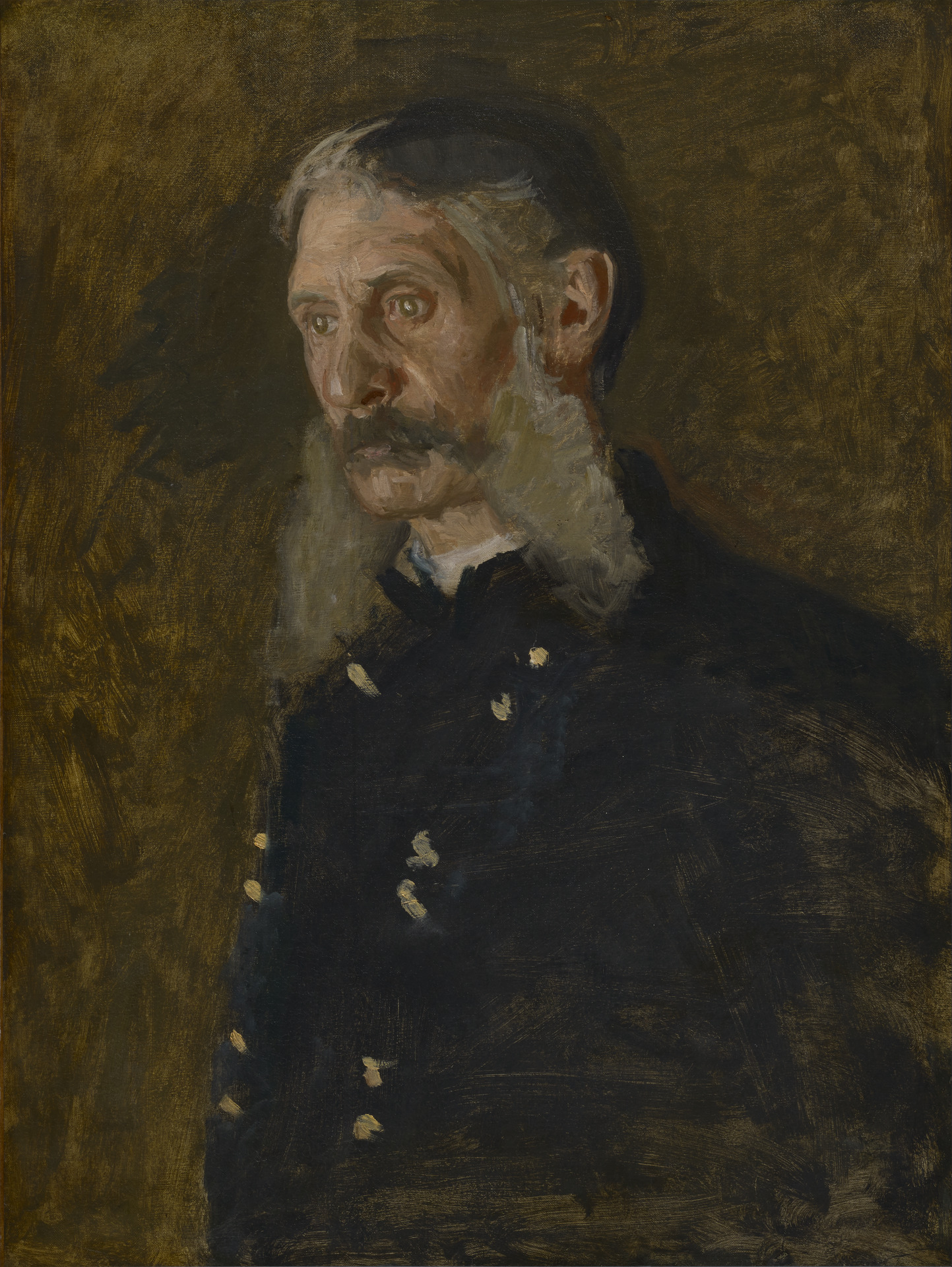
Portrait of General E. Burd Grubb by Thomas Eakins c. 1898

In 1889, Republicans nominated for Grubb for governor, hoping that the war hero could beat Leon Abbett, a popular former governor. During that year's convention, Grubb broke with tradition and addressed the gathering to thank them for his nomination. In his campaign, he called for ballot reform to break the power of the political machines. While Abbett was expected to easily beat the political novice, the election was close except in Hudson County where that county's machine did not take any chances. For example, more votes were counted in Jersey City's Irish wards than registered voters. Sixty-nine election workers were convicted of fraud and sent to prison. Abbett was still declared the winner even though his entire statewide margin came from Hudson, which sent a large delegation to the inauguration to remind the new Governor of that fact. In the hall, they even placed a banner that read "Hudson 13,515", referring to Abbett's margin from the county. When Abbett used his speech to call for ballot reform himself, a breeze caused the banner to fold and obscure the margin of victory. Senator Wertz was observed to exclaim "See!", as he pointed to the banner, "See how Abbett's majority shrinks as he advocates ballot reform."

Also that year, Benjamin Harrison had been inaugurated as president and selected a friend of Grubb, James G. Blaine, as secretary of state. Blaine arranged for Grubb to be one of Harrison's seven appointees to the 1890 Board of Visitors to West Point Military Academy; he was elected vice president. Among other things, his committee suggested the purchase of the academy's first Hotchkiss gun. Blaine then arranged for Grubb to be appointed as Ambassador to Spain. During his term, he negotiated a trade reciprocity treaty. In 1892, he resigned and returned to New Jersey.

Grubb remained politically active and left the Republican Party to become a reformer. He lost an election for Congress in 1908. He later actively campaigned for Woodrow Wilson when he ran for Governor two years later. Wilson and Grubb became close and the Governor often stayed at Grubb's home on the river.

=== Later years ===
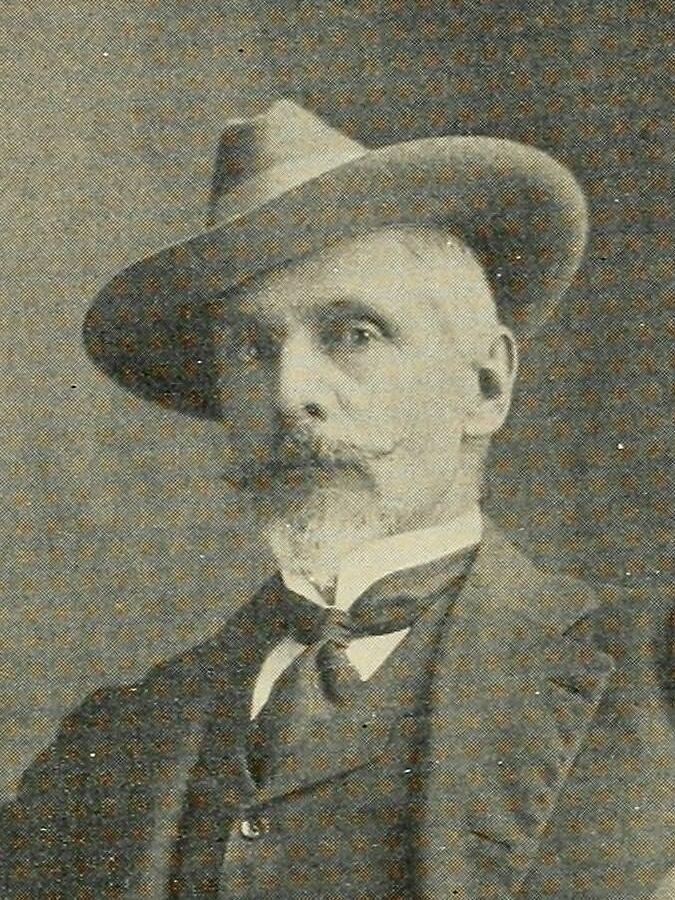
Grubb c. 1910

While in Spain, Grubb met Violet Sopwith (1865–1958), the daughter of an English mining engineer working in Spain. Violet's younger brother was Thomas Sopwith, who would later become a famous aviation pioneer. Burd and Violet married before their return to New Jersey and would go on to have three children, although one died young. Their son, Edward Burd Grubb III was the President of the New York Curb Exchange during the critical period after the creation of the SEC.

Burd was especially interested in the family's history and met with his distant cousin, Delaware Supreme Court Justice Ignatius Cooper Grubb, who was the family's historian during the period. The General made national news in 1908–1909 after meeting the commander of the 8th Alabama Regiment. Two units that once met as enemies at Salem Church, met again as friends at the "Yahoos Reunion" at Grubb's Grassmere estate.

In 1911, Grubb lost his fortune due to a bad investment and was appointed by then Governor Wilson as Superintendent of the New Jersey Home for Disabled Soldiers in Kearney, New Jersey. He died in Newark, New Jersey, and was buried in Saint Mary's Episcopal Churchyard in Burlington. Violet moved back to "Grubb Cottage", then owned by Grubb's brother. During the First World War, Violet chaired the British Emergency Aid Committee in Philadelphia and later retired to Maryland to live with her daughter.

== See also ==
- List of American Civil War brevet generals (Union)

Party political offices
Preceded by Benjamin Franklin Howey	Republican Nominee for Governor of New Jersey; 1889	Succeeded by John Kean
Diplomatic posts
Preceded by Thomas W. Palmer	U.S. Minister to Spain; 1890–1892	Succeeded by A. Loudon Snowden
