= Mount Hope Estate =

National Register of Historic Places-listed property

- U.S. National Register of Historic Places
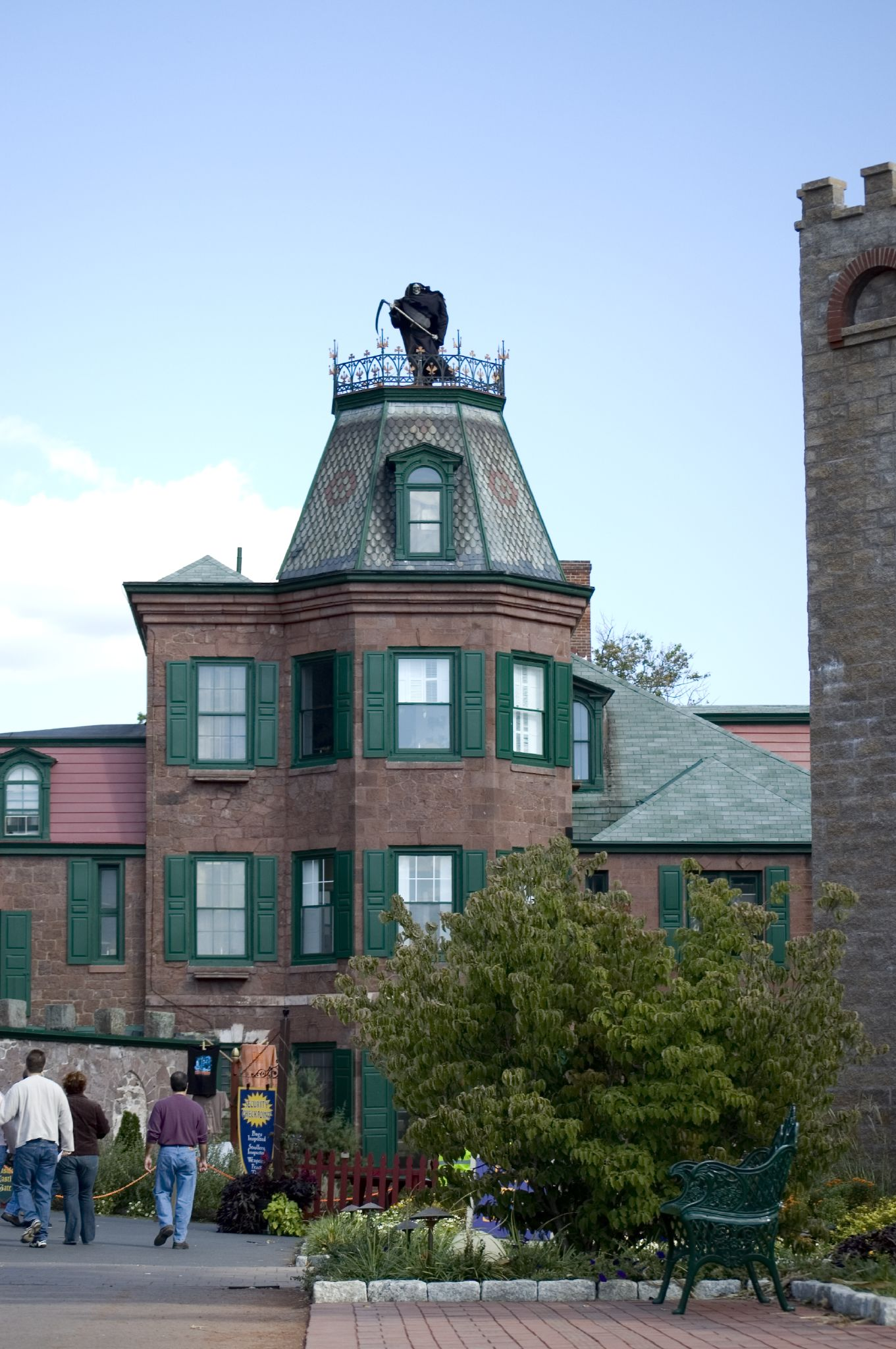
- Mount Hope Estate is a Federal-style house with significant Victorian additions.

- Location within Pennsylvania Location within the United States
- Location: Rapho Township, Lancaster County, Pennsylvania
- Coordinates: 40°13′37″N 76°25′47″W
- Area: 35 acres (14 ha)
- Built: 1805, 1895
- Architectural style: Federal, Late Victorian
- Visitation: 250,000 (Pennsylvania Renaissance Faire only) (2007)
- MPS: Iron and Steel Resources of Pennsylvania
- NRHP reference No.: 80003530, 91001146
- Added to NRHP: December 1, 1980, boundary increase in 1991

Mount Hope Estate is a National Register of Historic Places-listed property in Rapho and Penn Townships, Lancaster County, Pennsylvania. The original estate was the center of operations of the Grubb Family Iron Dynasty during the 19th century and included over 2,500 acres (1,000 ha), a charcoal iron furnace, a grist mill, housing for employees and tenants, plus supporting structures such as a post office, a general store, a railroad station, a school and a church. The existing mansion and grounds remain from what was once a thriving industrial headquarters complex and small village.

The mansion itself was originally constructed as a Federal-style (Note: The National Register of Historic Places Nomination Form states that "there is no book or article that gives reliable and scholarly information on the architecture of Mount Hope Mansion and the gardens. That information has been derived from unprinted sources and several contemporary newspaper accounts." All architectural information here is therefore drawn directly from the Nomination Form itself.) home by the prominent family of iron masters; an 1895 remodeling transformed the structure with the addition of Victorian features. The mansion is constructed of locally quarried red sandstone, as are the outbuildings, which at one time numbered nearly 30. The grounds is also notable for its pre-1840 American formal garden, of which there are very few surviving. The estate currently hosts the Mount Hope Estate and Winery, the Swashbuckler Brewing Company, the Pennsylvania Renaissance Faire, and other events held throughout the year (see below).

== History ==
The estate was the home and center of operations of the Grubb Family Iron Dynasty during the 19th century. The Mount Hope Grubbs were from an early American family whose founder, John Grubb, had come to America from Stoke Climsland, Cornwall, England and settled in Delaware. John's youngest son Peter Grubb came to the local area about 1734, when he discovered the vast iron deposits in Lebanon County and purchased 300 acres (120 ha). By 1742 he had founded the highly successful Cornwall Ironworks, named to recall his father's ancestral home. By 1783 the family's holdings covered 10,000 acres (4,000 ha). The property was split several times among heirs, and various lands passed between the Grubb and Coleman families in the late 18th century. In 1784, Peter Grubb's youngest son Peter Grubb, Jr. purchased an additional 212.5 acres (86.0 ha) and built a charcoal furnace at a place that he called "Mount Hope". Peter Jr. left the land to his two sons, who inherited a total of 2,307 acres (934 ha) that were to become known as the "Mount Hope Estate". His youngest son, Henry Bates Grubb, acquired his brother's share and built the mansion by 1805.

The Grubbs were locally prominent by at least 1784, and from 1840 to 1870 were the leading iron manufacturers in Pennsylvania, with Mount Hope Estate serving as the center of their operations. During this period the estate played host to many leading Pennsylvanians including the Shippen family, Episcopalian ministers including Bishop William White and Bishop Alonzo Potter, and other leading ironmasters including Robert Coleman. At the Grubb family's height in the mid-to-late 19th century, the estate included a charcoal furnace, mill workers' houses, Mount Hope Episcopal Church (also called Hope Church, and "principally erected for the Grubb family"), the mansion, many stone outbuildings, and large formal gardens.

After the death of Henry Bates Grubb, the estate was managed by his widow, Harriet Amelia Buckley Grubb, until her children reached adulthood. In 1848–49, at a cost of about $2,000, she had an Episcopal church, known today as "Hope Church", erected on the property, "for the moral and spiritual uplift of the tenants on her estate and the employees of the Mount Hope Furnace". In 1885, Clement Brooke Grubb, one of Henry's sons, purchased the mansion and surrounding land for $300,000 from the heirs of his younger brother, Alfred Bates Grubb. That October, Clement gave the church and churchyard to the Episcopal Diocese of Central Pennsylvania.

Upon Clement's death, he left it to his daughter, the last descendant of the Grubb family to own it, Daisy Elizabeth Brooke Grubb, who renovated the 32-room mansion in the Victorian architectural style. After Daisy's death, the property was subdivided and passed through numerous owners until Charles Romito purchased the mansion and immediately surrounding land for $1 million in 1980 to open a winery.

=== Mount Hope Estate and Winery ===
After planting the vineyards and vinting wines, Romito opened the Mount Hope Estate and Winery in 1980. To promote his new business the first year, Romito hosted several events including an art show, a bluegrass concert, a fifties revival, a country-western weekend, a classical orchestra concert, and a one-day modern jousting tournament. The jousting tournament was so popular that Romito held a two-day renaissance festival the following year in the winery's parking lot, and gradually expanded this into a permanent attraction, the Pennsylvania Renaissance Faire. The property was listed in the National Register of Historic Places in 1980, and in 1991 the boundaries were increased as part of the Iron and Steel Resources of Pennsylvania Multiple Property Submission (MPS).

=== Architecture ===
Two distinct architectural styles are visible in the Estate. Originally constructed in the Federal style for Henry Bates Grubb between 1800 and 1805, Mount Hope Estate was the most formal ironmaster's mansion built in the area between 1750 and 1850. In 1895, Daisy Grubb oversaw significant changes, adding a Victorian ballroom, a billiard room, chandeliers, and parquet floors, and converting original hinged doors to sliding doors, while still maintaining much of the original construction, including the original facade and fireplace mantels.

=== Exterior ===
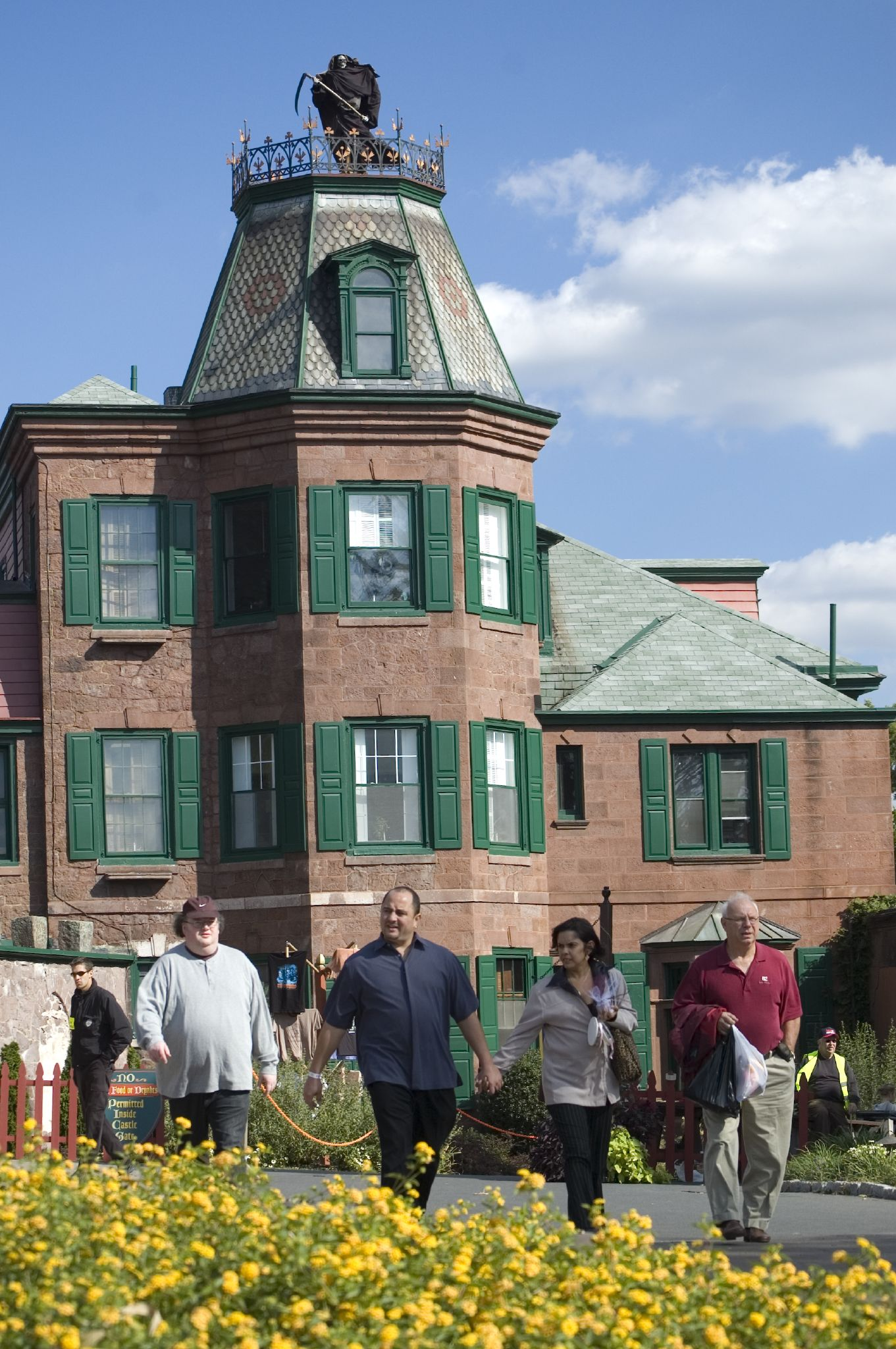
The three-story bay window which rises to an octagonal turret at the west end of the house was built as part of the 1895 remodelling.

The south-facing two-story facade, made of locally cut red sandstone, remains substantially unchanged from the original 1800–05 construction. The wooden porch running the length of the facade appears to be a reconstruction, as part of the 1895 remodeling, of a similar original porch.

The entire west end of the house went through substantial changes in the 1895 remodelling. This included the construction of a striking three-story bay window rising to an octagonal turret with a patterned roof, and a two-story bay window near the southwest corner. The most significant additions made during the 1895 remodelling are located at the rear (north) of the house. These include a conservatory with a polygonal glass dome, a greenhouse just east of the conservatory, and an enlarged kitchen. The eastern end of the house was also remodeled in 1895, in locally cut red sandstone to match the facade. Aside from several gothic arches from the original construction, the entire visible structure at this end was built in 1895.

=== Interior ===
The interior of the mansion, like the exterior, is a mixture of original 1800–05 construction and decoration, blended rooms, and Victorian construction and decor.

The entry hall is almost entirely original construction. Nearly all the woodwork and decoration in this area dates to the 1800–05 period, with the exception of several balusters and newel posts on the spiral staircase, which were Victorian replacements. The major change to the entry hall was the construction of false walls, allowing the conversion of the original hinged doors into sliding doors. The second floor central hall and Washington Room (on the second floor, in the southeast corner) were also changed very little in the renovation.

The dining room, on the other hand, saw extensive remodeling in 1895. The room size was increased by the construction of a bay window, parquet floor was installed, and the room was decorated in cherry woodwork, with a gilt and crystal chandelier and sconces. The only original item remaining left in the room was the fireplace mantel. The Pink Room, named for the pink damask which covered the walls in 1895, the library, the Best Chamber (Daisy Grubb's bedroom), was also extensively remodeled.

A number of new rooms were added to the house as part of the 1895 work. A billiard room and ballroom were added in the rear of the house, and several ornate bathrooms were added on the second and third floors.

== Grounds ==
=== Outbuildings ===
At one time there were nearly 30 outbuildings on the estate, as well as a wall surrounding the estate, all constructed of the same locally quarried red sandstone as the mansion, "of which there seems to be an inexhaustible supply on the estate". Some of the buildings, like Hope Church, are on property that was given away or subdivided over the years, and today, only four remain on the estate, all located to the north (rear) and northeast of the mansion.

The smokehouse is a square two-story building with a hipped roof, and is believed to date to the early 19th century. East of the smokehouse, a 1 1/2-story building with a three bay facade and a gabled roof was used as a post office in the late 19th century, and may have served as a schoolhouse originally. The manager's farmhouse stands 2 1/2 stories high and is L-shaped with a porch. The springhouse is also 2 1/2 stories.

=== Gardens ===
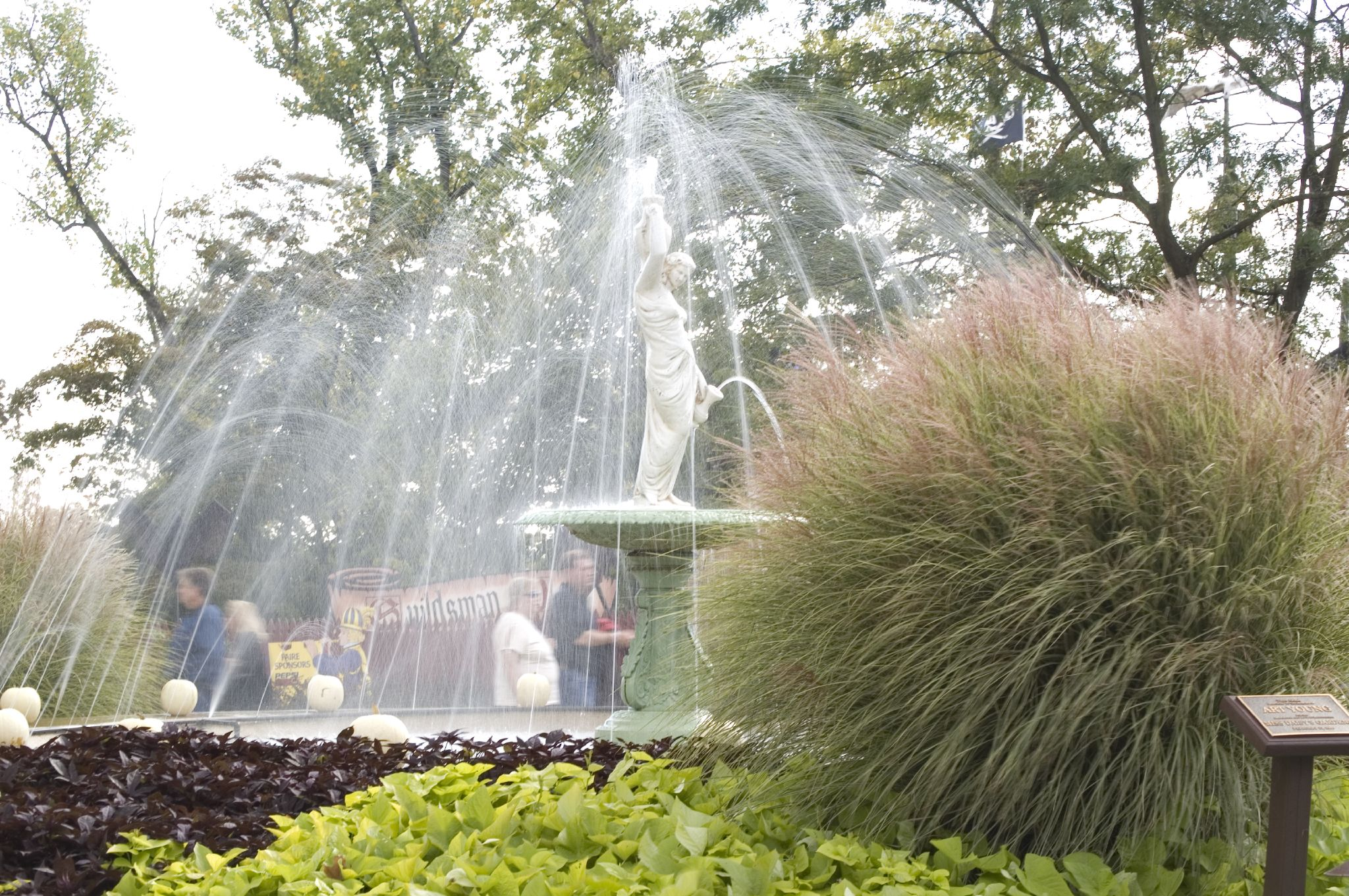
A fountain in the Mount Hope gardens

The overall plan of the gardens, based on English formal gardens, can be traced to the original 1800–05 construction. Although some flower beds, ornamental urns, and the round fountain in front of the mansion were installed at the time of the 1895 remodeling, the overall plan was not changed, leaving the garden as "a very rare and largely intact example of a documented American formal garden predating 1840."

== Mount Hope Estate Craft Brands ==
Swashbuckler Brewing Company was founded in 2000 by Scott Bowser, managing partner of Mount Hope Estate & Winery, on the grounds of the Pennsylvania Renaissance Faire. In 2015, SBC Brewsmiths was established on the estate to brew beers for 3 separate companies: Swashbuckler Brewing, Rumspringa Brewing and Devine Swine Brewing.

Mount Hope Winery opened in early 1980 to attract visitors to the estate, with early wine production located in Lake Erie County. In 2015, wine production returned to Lancaster County following the acquisition of another winery's assets; later during 2017, a nearby barn originally built during the 1800s was repurposed into a winery facility. Lancaster County Cider was introduced in 2016 and is sold through Mount Hope retail locations and regional distribution.

== Pennsylvania Renaissance Faire ==
In 1980, a jousting tournament was held in the parking lot of the newly opened winery, followed by a two-day Renaissance fair the following year. This gradually expanded to become the Pennsylvania Renaissance Faire, which is now held over 12 weekends and draws more than 250,000 patrons annually. Featuring a recreation of a 16th-century Tudor village, a replica of the Globe Theatre, Shakespearean plays, musical acts, and artisans fashioning period items such as pottery and potpourri. In 1998, the faire was named one of the top 100 motorcoach-accessible events in America by the American Bus Association.

== Other events ==
In addition to hosting the Renaissance fair, the grounds are opened to the public for a number of other events. Tours of the mansion and wine tastings are available throughout the year. Each June, the site is used for the Celtic Fling and Highland Games. The Fling features traditional and modern Celtic music, food, crafts, demonstrations and competitions, and a feis is also held. The Highland Games are officially sanctioned by the Mid-Atlantic Scottish Athletics Association, and include standard events such as caber tossing and hammer throwing.

In late fall and early winter, the mansion is host to several theatrical performances. From the end of October to mid-November, Poe Evermore, a storytelling event based on the works of Edgar Allan Poe is held. Between Thanksgiving and Christmas, Victorian Christmas or A Dickens of a Christmas, the telling of the story of A Christmas Carol, is performed.
