= Overlook Colony, Delaware =

Unincorporated community in Delaware, United States

- Unincorporated community
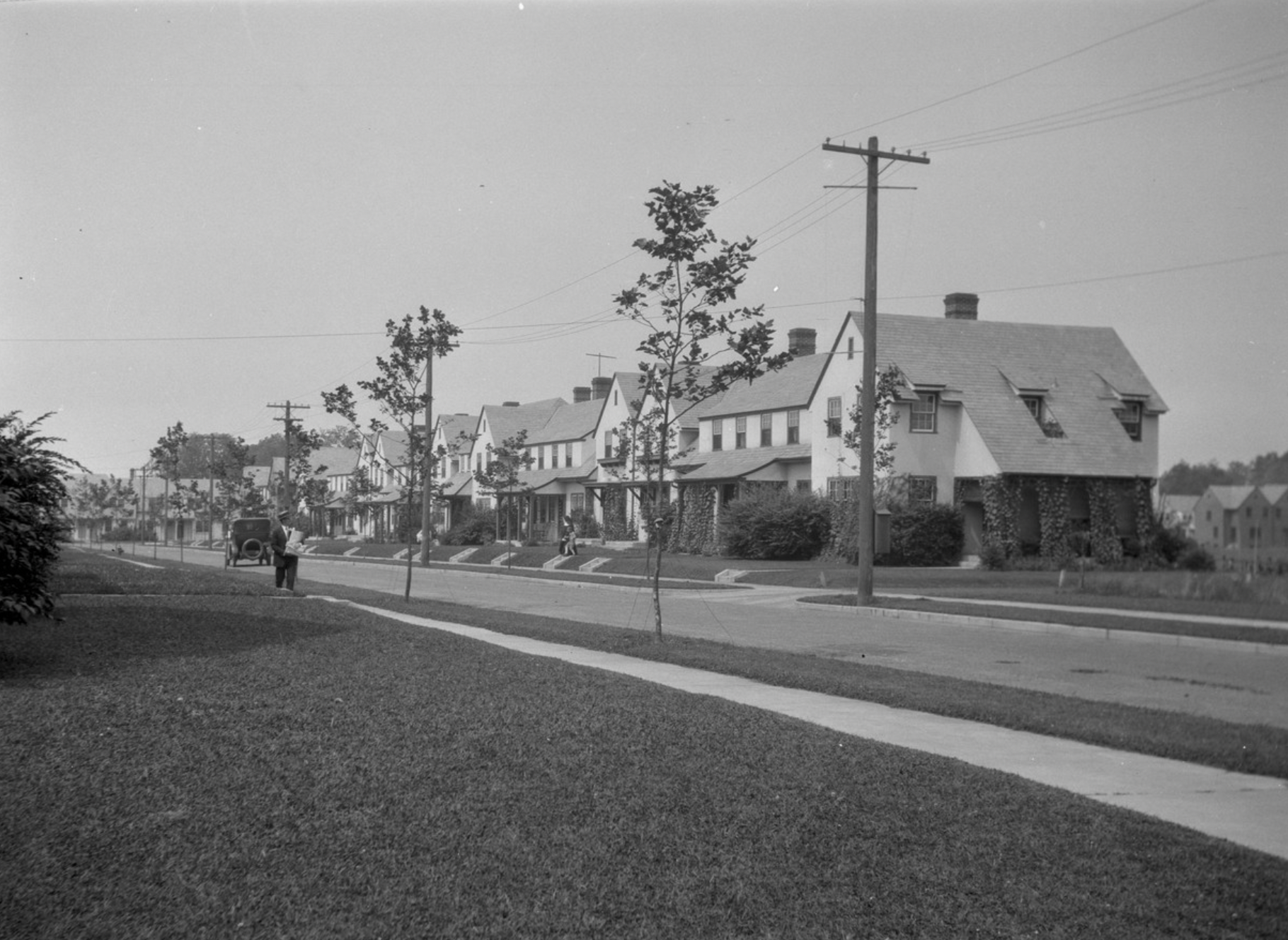
- Overlook Colony street soon after opening

- Location within Delaware Location within the United States
- Coordinates: 39°48′15″N 75°28′09″W
- Country: United States
- State: Delaware
- County: New Castle
- Elevation: 102 ft (31 m)
- Time zone: UTC-5 (Eastern (EST))
  - Summer (DST): UTC-4 (EDT)
- Area code: 302
- GNIS feature ID: 216848

Overlook Colony is an unincorporated community in Claymont, New Castle County, Delaware, United States.

== Geography ==
Overlook Colony is located west of the Philadelphia Pike between Harvey Road and Darley Road. It is east of Interstate 95 (separating it from Ashbourne Hills and Radnor Green) and CSX Transportation Philadelphia Subdivision rail. The south branch of Naamans Creek and run through the area.

== History ==
The original layout for Overlook Colony was originally designed by city planner and landscape architect John Nolan while the buildings were designed by architect H. Errol Coffin It was developed in the early 1910s largely as workforce housing of the General Chemical Company.

Some the homes have been expanded and restored to historic specifications. The community center was restored in 2000.

It has been designated a "Blueprint Community", an initiative by Federal Home Loan Bank of Pittsburgh and the University of Delaware to reinvigorate distressed neighborhoods.

== See also ==
- Union Park Gardens
- Worthland, Delaware
- Hickman Row
