= Claymont (disambiguation) =

Claymont may refer to:

- Claymont, Delaware, U.S.
- Claymont, Lexington, a neighborhood in Lexington, Kentucky, U.S.
- Claymont (SEPTA station), Delaware, U.S.
- Claymont Elementary School in Ballwin, Mississippi, U.S.
- Claymont High School in Uhrichsville, Ohio, U.S.
- Claymont Stone School, a historic schoolhouse in Claymont, Delaware, U.S.
- Claymont Elementary School in Claymont, Delaware, U.S.
