= Worthland, Delaware =

Unincorporated community in Delaware, United States

- Unincorporated community
- Location within Delaware Location within the United States
- Coordinates: 39°48′30″N 75°26′59″W
- Country: United States
- State: Delaware
- County: New Castle
- Elevation: 82 ft (25 m)
- Time zone: UTC-5 (Eastern (EST))
  - Summer (DST): UTC-4 (EDT)
- Area code: 302
- GNIS feature ID: 214883

Worthland is an unincorporated community in New Castle County, Delaware, United States. Worthland is located northwest of U.S. Route 13 and northeast of Interstate 495 to the northeast of Claymont. It was originally developed by Worth Steel Corporation as a community for its workforce.

== See also ==
- Hickman Row
- Union Park Gardens
- Overlook Colony
