= Robinson House (Claymont, Delaware) =

Historic guest house in Delaware, US

- U.S. National Register of Historic Places
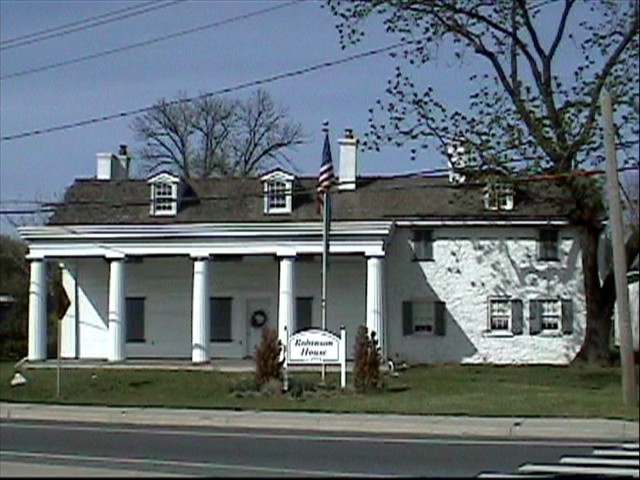
- Robinson House, April 2006

- Location within Delaware Location within the United States
- Location: 1 Naamans Road, Claymont, Delaware
- Coordinates: 39.81031°N 75.44187°W
- Area: 1 acre (0.40 ha)
- Built: 1654
- Architect: Rising, Johan
- NRHP reference No.: 71000225
- Added to NRHP: June 21, 1971

The Robinson House is a historic guest house located at the junction of Naamans Road (Delaware Route 92) and The Kings Highway (now U.S. Route 13, Philadelphia Pike) in Claymont, Delaware, in the United States. It was built in 1723, on the site of the original settlement on Naaman's Creek. The Block House, which stands a few yards northeast of the Robinson House, is the only remaining building from the original 1654 settlement.

George Washington, General Anthony Wayne, the Marquis de Lafayette, and "Light Horse" Harry Lee were all guests at the Robinson House. From 1914 to 1964, the Robinson House was home to the Naamans Tea House.

The Robinson House is currently the home of the Claymont Historical Society, the Darley Society, and the Naamans Heritage Association.

== Gallery ==
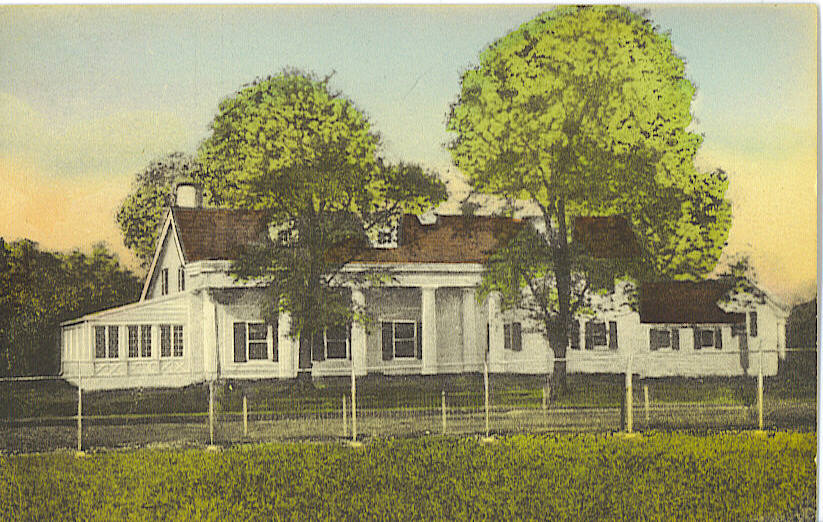
The Robinson House, image from Postcard ca 1910.

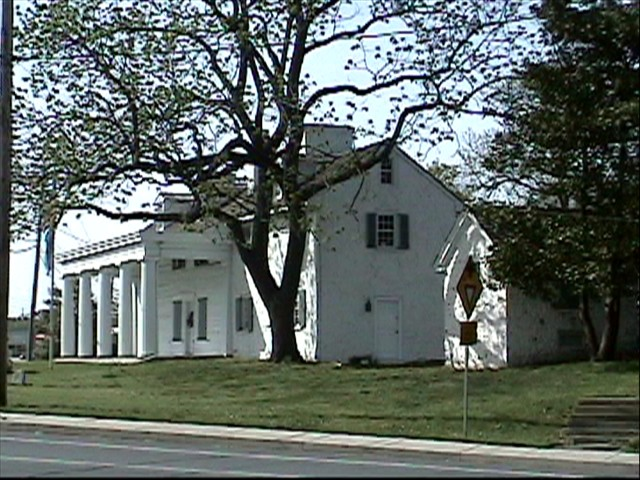
Robinson House - Facing West - April 2006

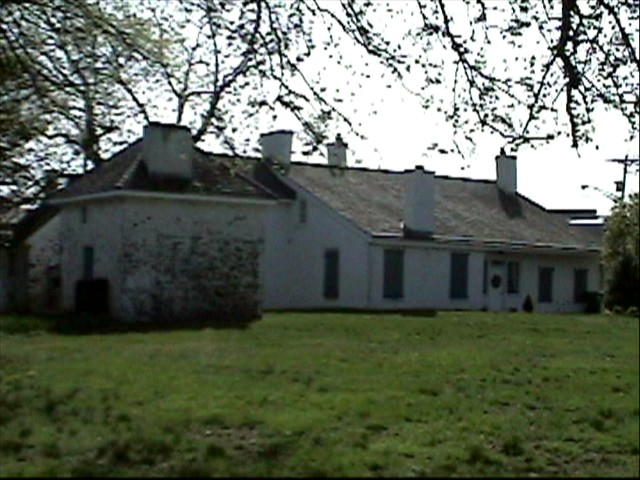
Robinson House Rear (right side) and Block House Rear (left side)

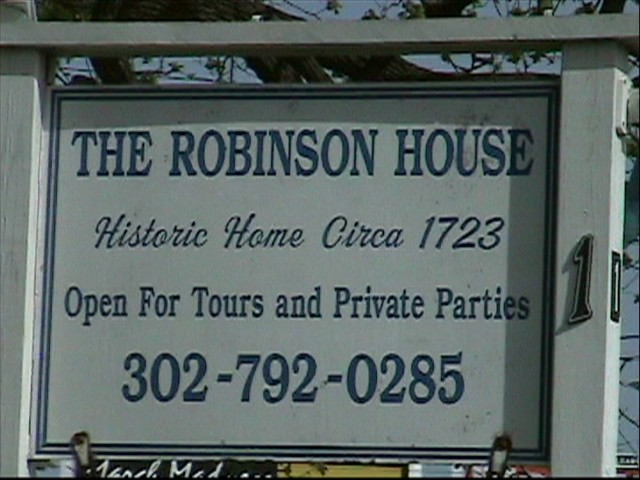
Robinson House Sign on Naamans Road, Claymont, DE
