= Block House (Delaware) =

Building in Delaware, United States

Coordinates: 39.8103°N 75.4416°W

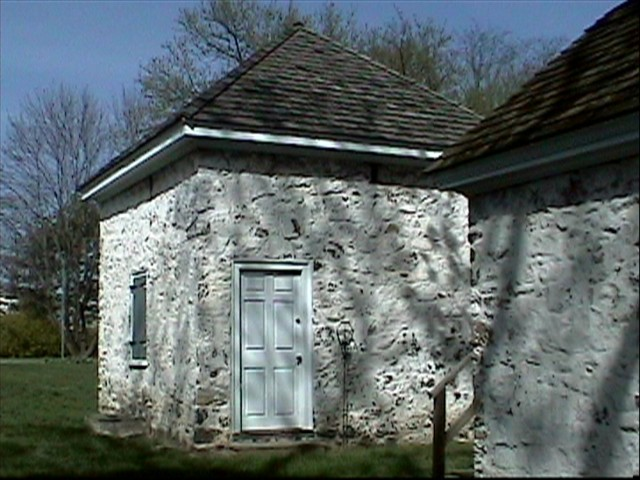
Block House front, facing north, April 2006

The Block House is a 17th-century historic building located off Naamans Road in Claymont, Delaware. The Block House is believed to be the only structure remaining of original Swedish colonial settlement on Naamans Creek.

== History ==
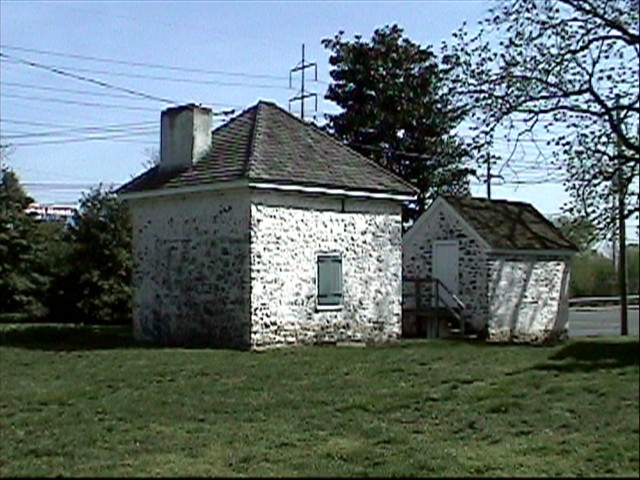
Block House, facing southeast, April 2006 (the smaller building in front is a spring house)

The Block House is believed to have been constructed in 1654 under instruction of Johan Risingh, who was the last Governor of the Colony of New Sweden. Chief Peminacka of the Minqua tribe had deeded the large tract of land along Naaman's Creek to John Risingh on behalf of the Swedish colony.

The structure was originally designed for defense. During September 1655, the Block House was taken by the Dutch West India Company under Peter Stuyvesant at the same time that Dutch forces captured Fort Christina. In 1671, the Block House was attacked by Native Americans. It was captured by the British Army in 1777 during the American Revolutionary War.

The Block House consists of one room with a lower and upper level. Inside is a relatively large fireplace and the former living quarters for the Robinson House cook. That 18th-century house was built in 1723 on nearby land. The date of construction of the Block House has been disputed. Some scholars say the Block House was not built until later, possibly around the time the Robinson House was built in 1723.

== See also ==
- List of the oldest buildings in Delaware

== Other sources ==
- Johnson, Amandus Johan Classon Rising: The Last Governor of New Sweden (Philadelphia: The Swedish Colonial Society, 1915)
- Ward, Christopher. Dutch and Swedes on the Delaware, 1609 - 1664 (University of Pennsylvania Press, 1930)
