= Alaus melanops =

Conservation status
- Unranked (NatureServe)

Scientific classification
- Kingdom: Animalia
- Phylum: Arthropoda
- Clade: Pancrustacea
- Class: Insecta
- Order: Coleoptera
- Suborder: Polyphaga
- Infraorder: Elateriformia
- Family: Elateridae
- Genus: Alaus
- Species: A. melanops

Binomial name
- Alaus melanops LeConte, 1863

Species of beetle

Alaus melanops is a species in the Alaus genus. It is commonly known as the western eyed click beetle and the western eyed eletar. The species name, melanops, is Greek for black face or appearance.

It is native to North America, and its size can range from 20 to 30 mm (0.8 to 1.2 in). Larvae are predatory, whereas adults feed on nectar.
