= Darley House =

Historic house in Delaware, United States

- U.S. National Register of Historic Places
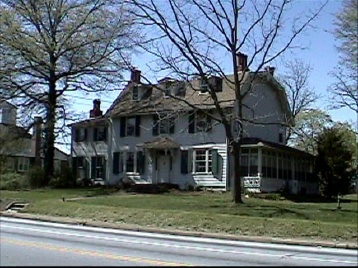
- Darley House - Claymont, Delaware

- Location within Delaware Location within the United States
- Location: 3701 Philadelphia Pike, Claymont, Delaware
- Nearest city: Wilmington, Delaware
- Coordinates: 39.804881°N 75.454248°W
- Area: less than one acre
- Built: 1859
- NRHP reference No.: 73000508
- Added to NRHP: July 2, 1973

The Darley House, located in Claymont, New Castle County, Delaware, at 3701 Philadelphia Pike, at the intersection of Philadelphia Pike and Darley Road, is the former home of world-renowned illustrator Felix Octavius Carr Darley (1821–1888).

Upon his marriage in 1859, F. O. C. Darley moved to Claymont, Delaware where he worked for the next 19 years. Built in the late 18th century and enlarged several times during the first half of the 19th century, the house was purchased by Darley in 1863 and renamed "The Wren’s Nest."

During his career, Darley made illustrations for works by Washington Irving, Edgar Allan Poe, Nathaniel Hawthorne, Charles Dickens, and James Fenimore Cooper. Two of his most notable works were Irving's "Legend of Sleepy Hollow" and "Rip Van Winkle." Charles Dickens visited here for two weeks during his triumphant tour of America in 1867. He died at his home-studio while finishing a Dickens portfolio in 1888.

The house was added to the National Register of Historic Places in 1973.

The Darley House is located across Darley Road from the Claymont Stone School, and is directly opposite Archmere Academy.

== See also ==
National Register of Historic Places listings in northern New Castle County, Delaware
