= Emile G. Perrot =

American architect

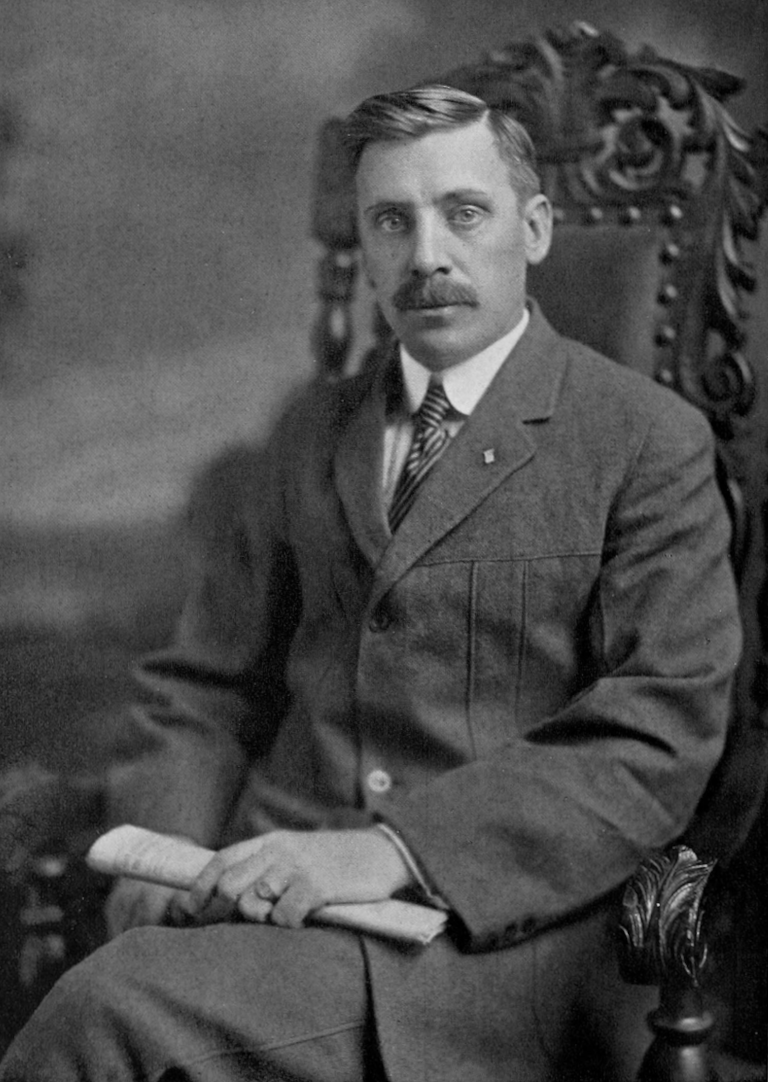
- Born: Emile George Perrot; November 12, 1872; Philadelphia, Pennsylvania
- Died: February 7, 1954 (aged 81); Philadelphia, Pennsylvania
- Education: University of Pennsylvania
- Occupation(s): Architect, engineer
- Spouse: Agnes A. Robb (m. 1896)
- Children: 7

Signature
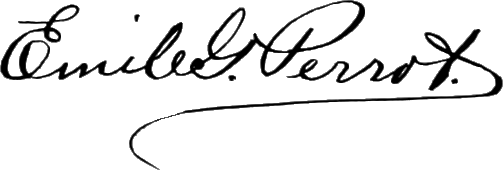

Emile George Perrot (November 12, 1872 – February 7, 1954) was an architect and engineer from Philadelphia, Pennsylvania, United States.

== Career ==
Perrot was born in Philadelphia on November 12, 1872. He graduated from the University of Pennsylvania. He married Agnes A. Robb on June 10, 1896, and they had seven children.

In 1902, Perrot formed a partnership with Walter Francis Ballinger, a firm known as Ballinger & Perrot. When Ballinger bought out Perrot's share in 1920, the firm became known as The Ballinger Company, and Perott opened his own office.

Perrot was a member of the American Institute of Architects and the American Society of Civil Engineers. Beginning in 1902, he gave lectures on the uses of reinforced concrete at the University of Pennsylvania.

Perrot died at St. Joseph's Hospital in Philadelphia on February 7, 1954, and was buried at Old Cathedral Cemetery.

== Principal architectural works ==
- Union Park Gardens, Wilmington, Delaware (completed in 1918)
- St. Vincent's School, Church Street, Plymouth, Pennsylvania (built in 1922).
- Our Lady of Mercy Academy, Syosset, New York (completed in 1928).
- White-Gravenor Hall, Georgetown University, Washington, D.C. (completed in 1933).

== Gallery ==
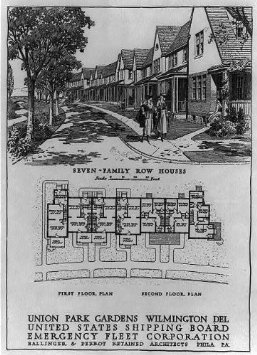
Union Park Gardens (completed in 1918)

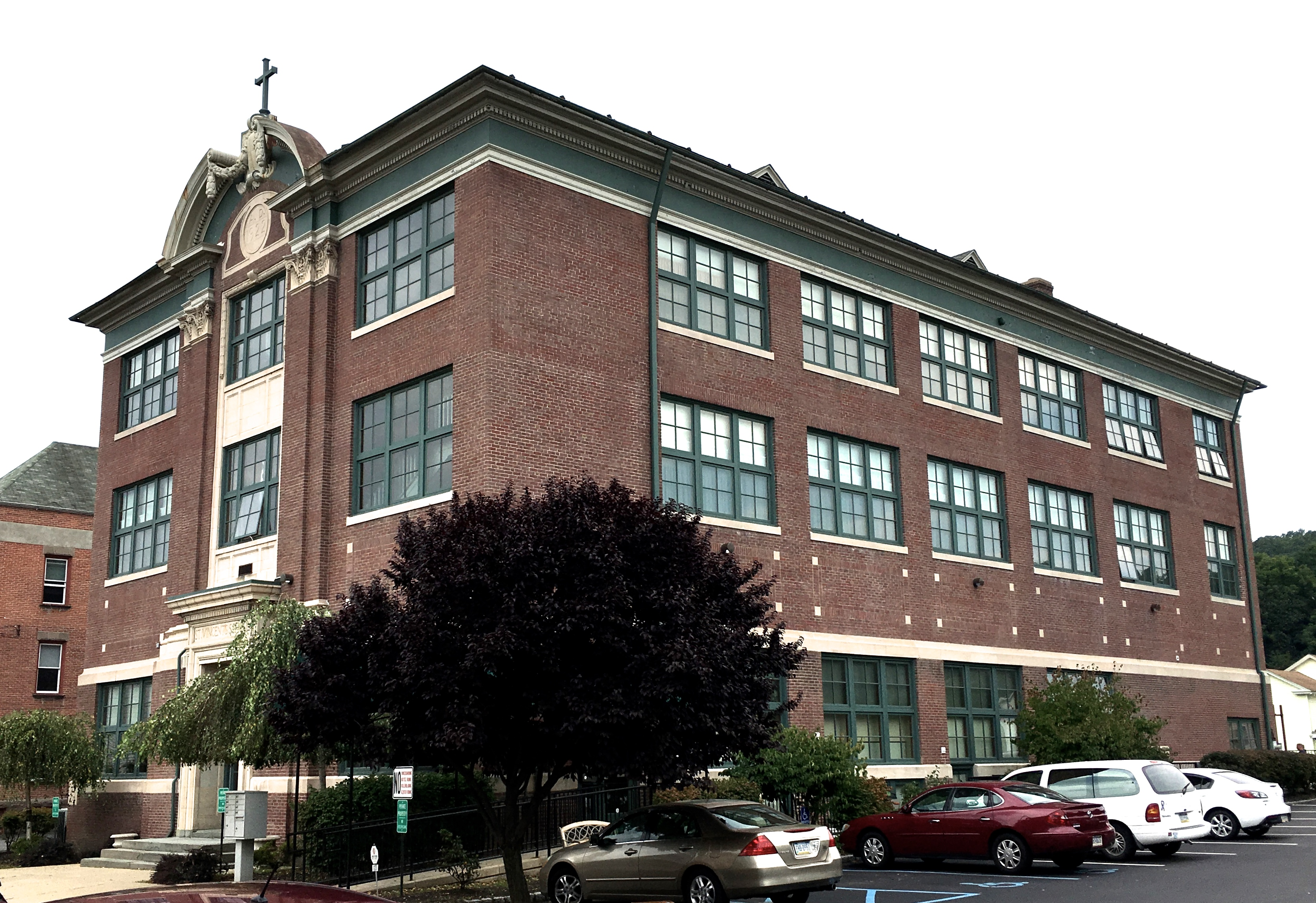
St. Vincent's School, Plymouth, Pennsylvania (completed in 1922)

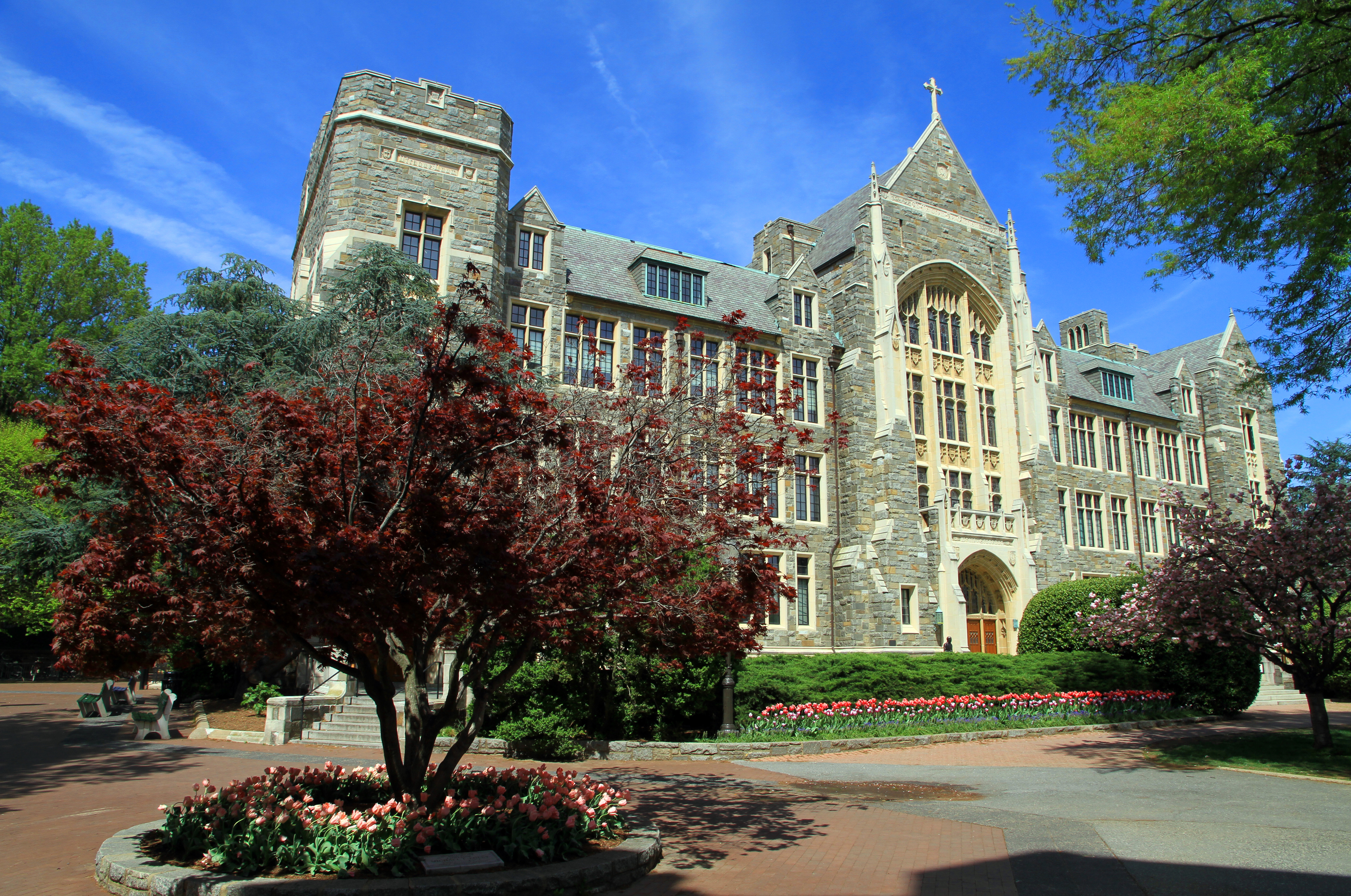
White-Gravenor Hall, Georgetown University (completed in 1933)
