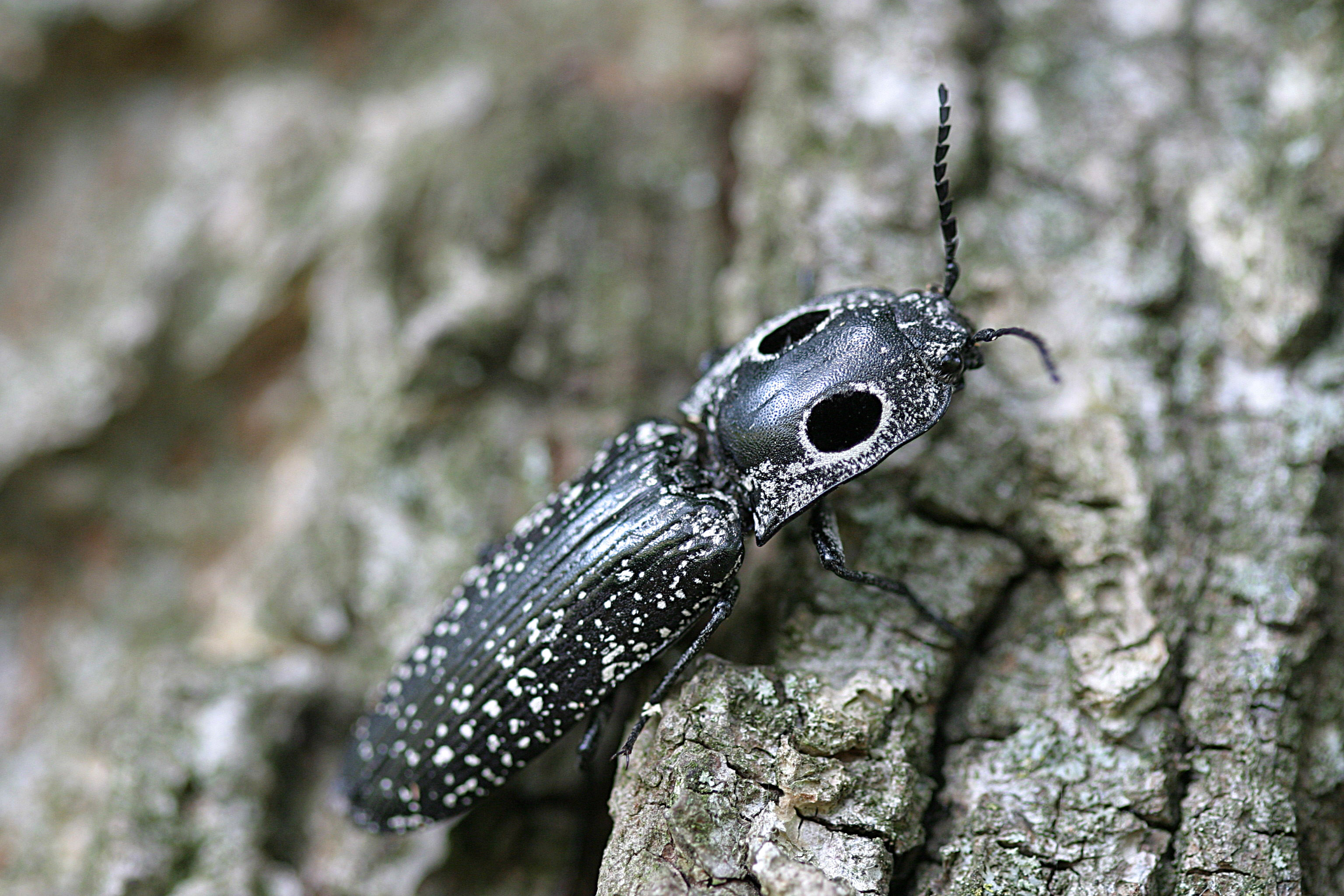
- Alaus oculatus
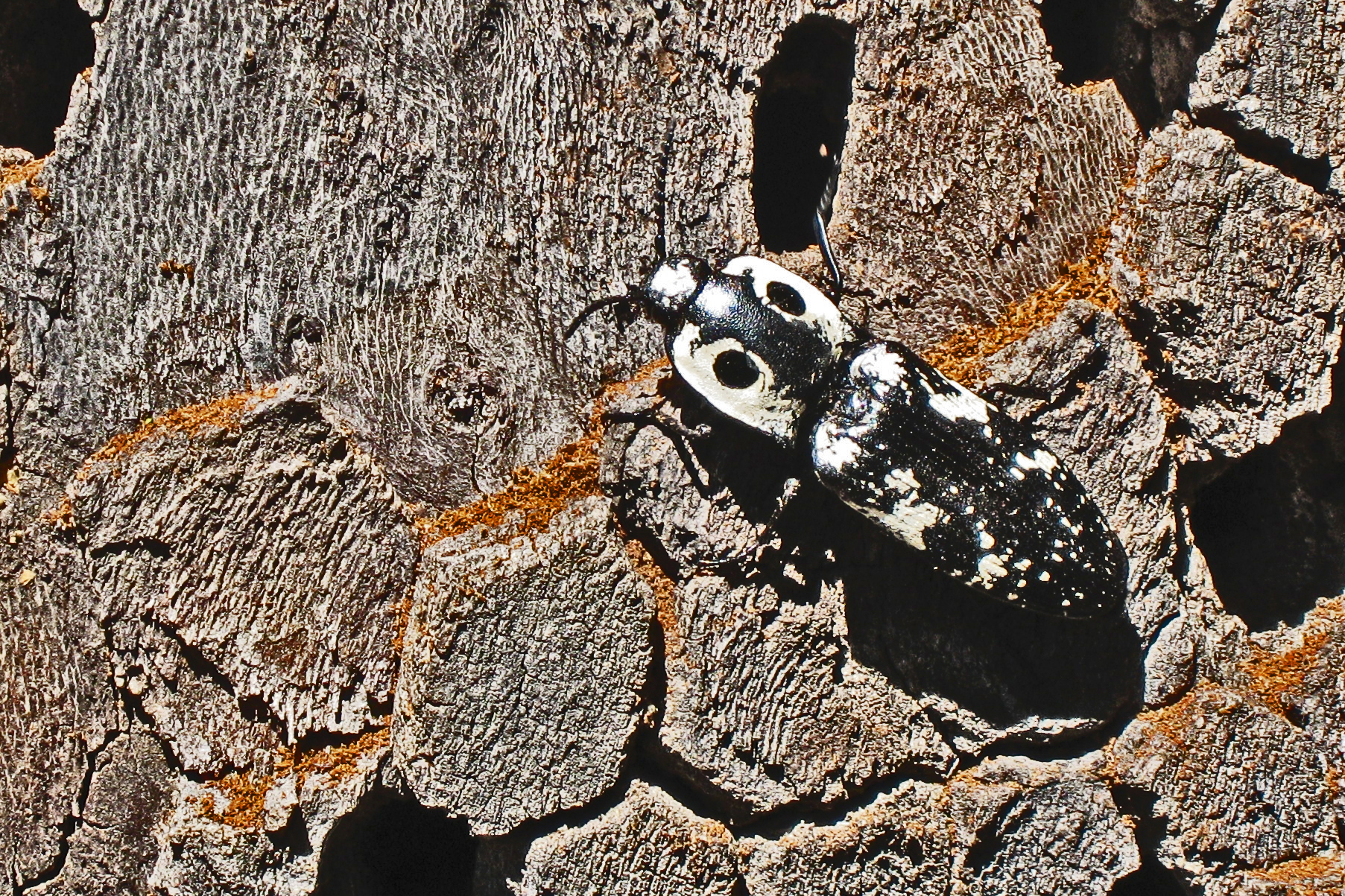
- Alaus zunianus

Scientific classification
- Kingdom: Animalia
- Phylum: Arthropoda
- Class: Insecta
- Order: Coleoptera
- Suborder: Polyphaga
- Infraorder: Elateriformia
- Family: Elateridae
- Tribe: Hemirhipini
- Genus: Alaus; Eschscholtz, 1829

= Alaus =

Genus of beetles

Alaus is a genus of click beetle belonging to the family Elateridae. Unlike many click beetles, Alaus larvae are completely predatory.

== Selected species ==
- Alaus lusciosus (Hope, 1832)
- Alaus melanops LeConte, 1863
- Alaus myops (Fabricius, 1791)
- Alaus naja Candèze, 1868
- Alaus oculatus (Linnaeus, 1758) - eyed click beetle
- Alaus oklahomensis Hatch, 1930
- Alaus pantherinus Candèze, 1881
- Alaus patricius Candeze, 1857
- Alaus plebejus Candèze, 1874
- Alaus zunianus Casey, 1893
