= Claymont Stone School =

- Naaman's Creek School
- U.S. National Register of Historic Places
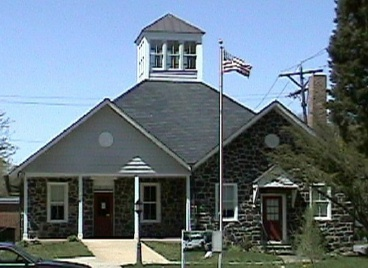
- Claymont Stone School, April 2006

- Location within Delaware Location within the United States
- Location: 3611 Philadelphia Pike, Claymont, Delaware
- Coordinates: 39.804772°N 75.454689°W
- Area: 0.2 acres (0.081 ha)
- Built: 1805
- Architect: William S. Bird
- Architectural style: Early Republic, One-room school
- NRHP reference No.: 90001715
- Added to NRHP: November 15, 1990

The Claymont Stone School, also known as Naaman's Creek School #1, is a historic schoolhouse built in 1805, on land donated by Founding Father John Dickinson, in Claymont, Delaware, on the Philadelphia Pike just south of the Darley House. The school was listed in the National Register of Historic Places in 1990. Its official Delaware State Historic Marker indicates that the school "may have been the first racially integrated public school in the State."

The original building was renovated in 1905 and expanded to become a two-room schoolhouse, serving the neighborhood of Claymont and the rural Naaman's Creek area as a school until the 1924–25 school year, when the Green Street School was built.

In 1928 the Stone School was converted to serve as a community center and public library, but in 1988 it was deemed structurally unsound. Thereafter, it stood empty, and the school district considered tearing it down until a group called Friends of the Claymont Stone School intervened to save the building, raising funds for its renovation and conversion into a museum and heritage center, which was completed in 2002.
