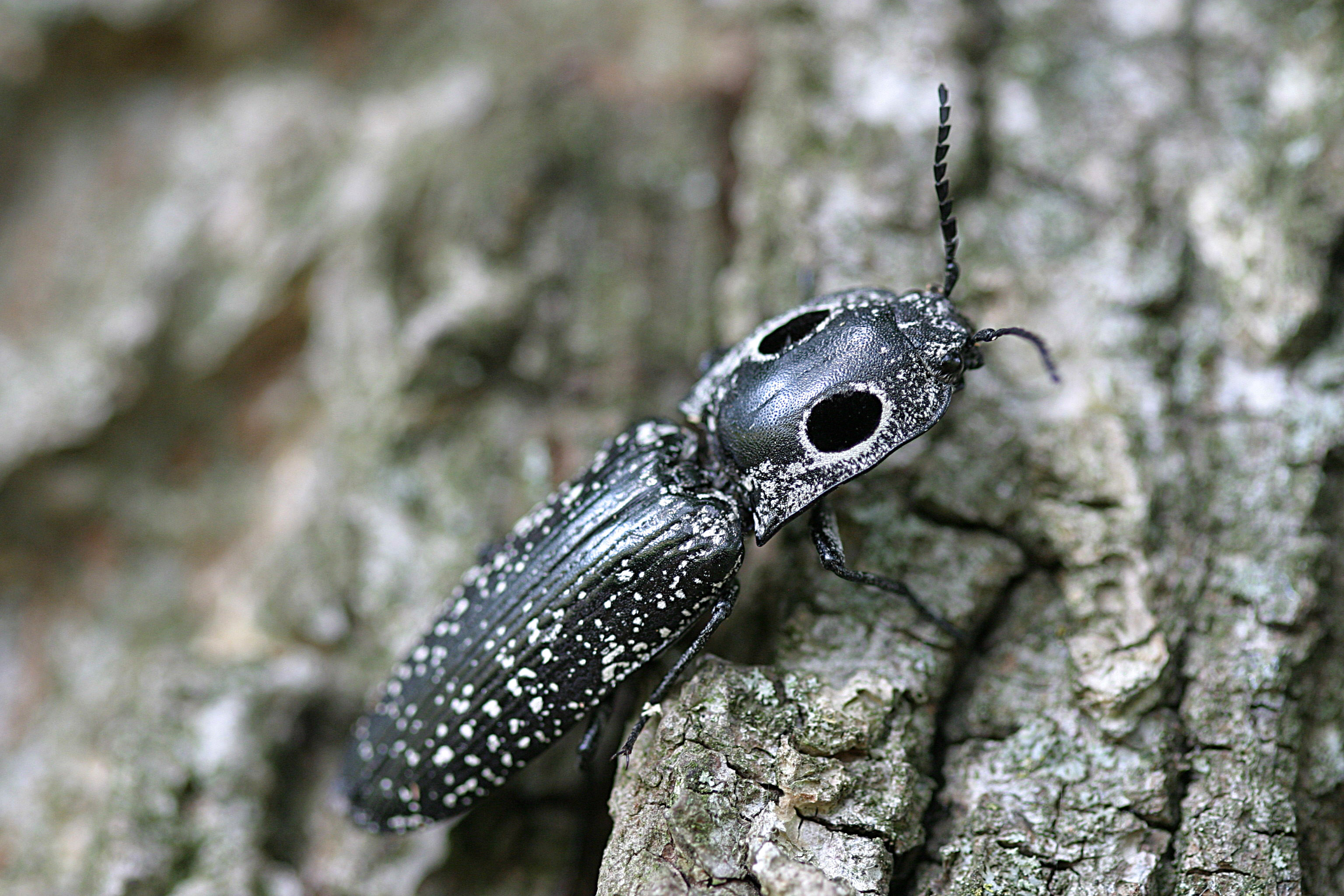

Scientific classification
- Kingdom: Animalia
- Phylum: Arthropoda
- Class: Insecta
- Order: Coleoptera
- Suborder: Polyphaga
- Infraorder: Elateriformia
- Family: Elateridae
- Subfamily: Agrypninae
- Tribe: Hemirhipini
- Genus: Alaus
- Species: A. oculatus

Binomial name
- Alaus oculatus (Linnaeus, 1758)

Synonyms
- Elater oculatus Linnæus, 1758

= Alaus oculatus =

Species of beetle

Alaus oculatus, commonly called the eastern eyed click beetle or eyed elater, is a species of click beetle.

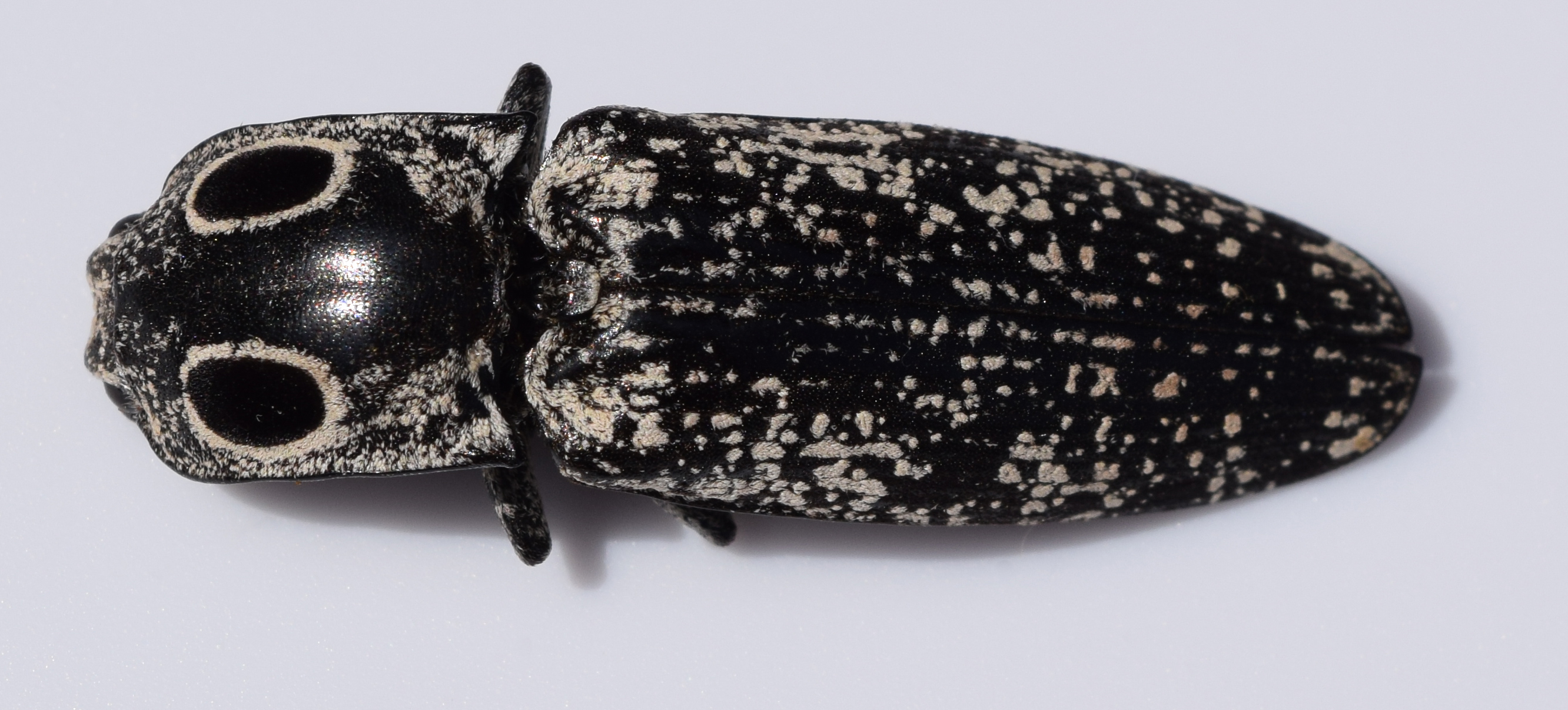
Alaus oculatus, preserved specimen

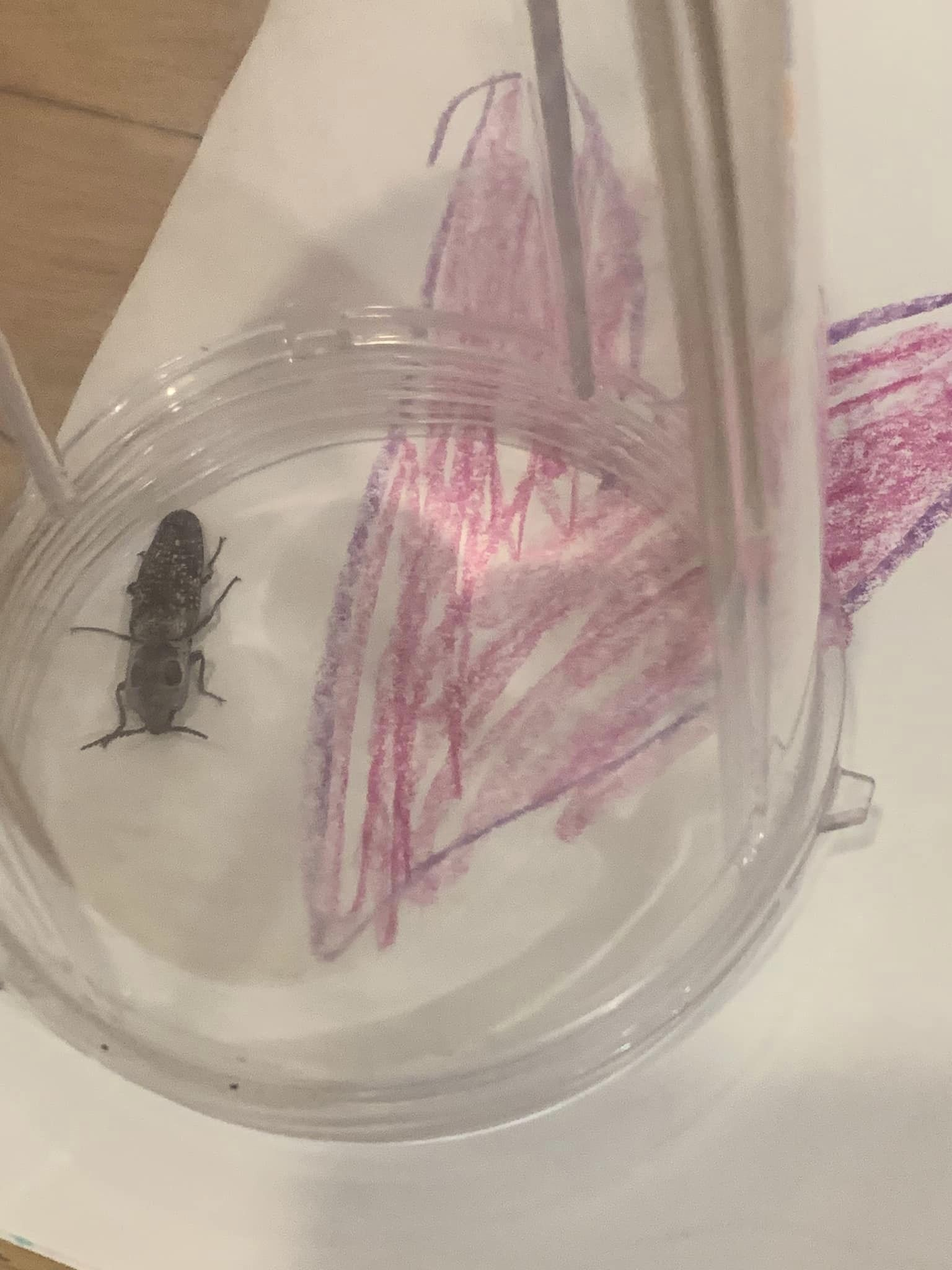

== Description ==
Alaus oculatus can reach a length of about 25–45 millimetres (1.0–1.8 in). They have an elongated body, black in color throughout. The pronotum exhibits a large oval patch of darker scales, framed in white, on each side - the common name of the beetle derives from this feature. The elytra are striated and mottled with silvery whitish scales. The depiction of a large pair of eyes on the pronotum is a defensive adaptation that has evolved because of its advantage in confusing or frightening potential predators. These “eyespots” are a form of self-mimicry, in which one part of the body has adapted to mimic another body part. Like all click beetles, A. oculatus is also capable of suddenly catapulting itself out of danger by releasing the energy stored by a click mechanism, which consists of a stout spine on the prosternum and a matching groove in the mesosternum.

== Life cycle ==
Eggs are laid in soil or on standing deadwood. Many larvae from the click beetle family Elateridae are commonly referred to as wireworms and are prominent agricultural pests that feast on plant matter. However, the larvae of Alaus oculatus are unique among wireworms because they are predatory to other beetle larvae feeding in decaying wood, especially Cerambycidae. The larva pupate in rotting logs or below the ground and the adults emerge in the spring and are commonly found until September.

== Diet ==
The adults do not eat much but their diet consists of nectar and plant juice. The larvae diet consists of grubs of wood-boring beetles. The larvae are voracious on wood borers, and during their development caged specimens were observed to devour more than 200 cerambycid larvae each.

== Distribution and habitat ==
This species is present in Central and North America. It can be found in deciduous/mixed forests and woodlands.
