= Hickman Row =

Historic houses in Delaware, US

- U.S. National Register of Historic Places
- U.S. Historic district
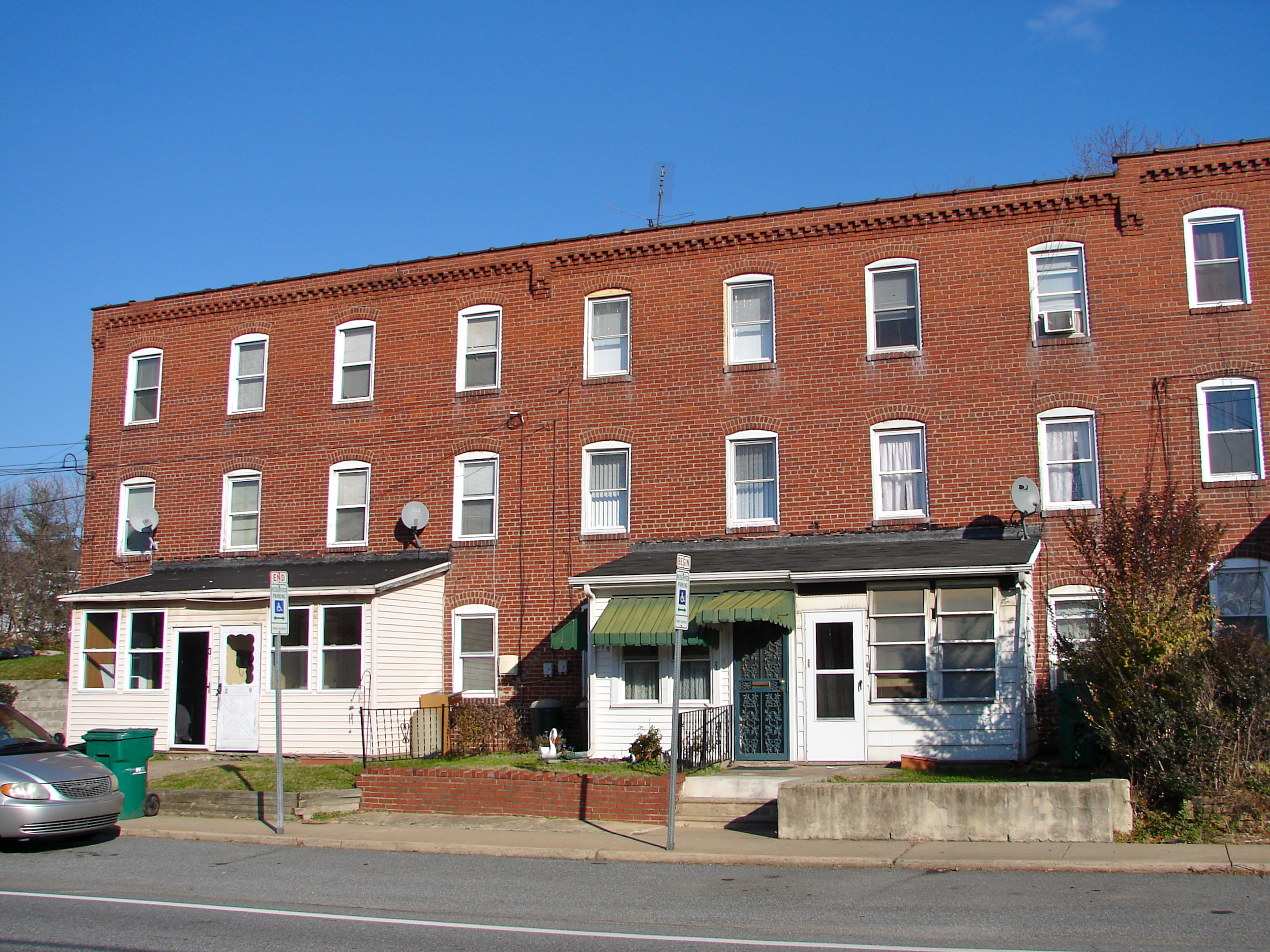
- Hickman Row, November 2010

- Location within Delaware Location within the United States
- Location: 1–117 Hickman Rd. (DE 491), Claymont, Delaware
- Coordinates: 39°48′57″N 75°26′42″W
- Area: 2.5 acres (1.0 ha)
- Built: c. 1919
- Architectural style: 20th Century Vernacular
- NRHP reference No.: 06000284
- Added to NRHP: June 16, 2006

Hickman Row is a set of historic rowhouses and national historic district located at Claymont, Delaware, United States. It encompasses 24 contributing buildings and 1 contributing structure. It was built about 1919 and consists of two blocks of row houses constructed by the Worth Steel Corporation to house their African American workforce. Each brick rowhouse has approximately 1,350 square feet with three bedrooms and one bathroom. The houses were sold to individuals by the Colorado Fuel and Iron Corporation in 1962–1963.

It was listed on the National Register of Historic Places in 2006.
