= F. O. C. Darley =

American illustrator

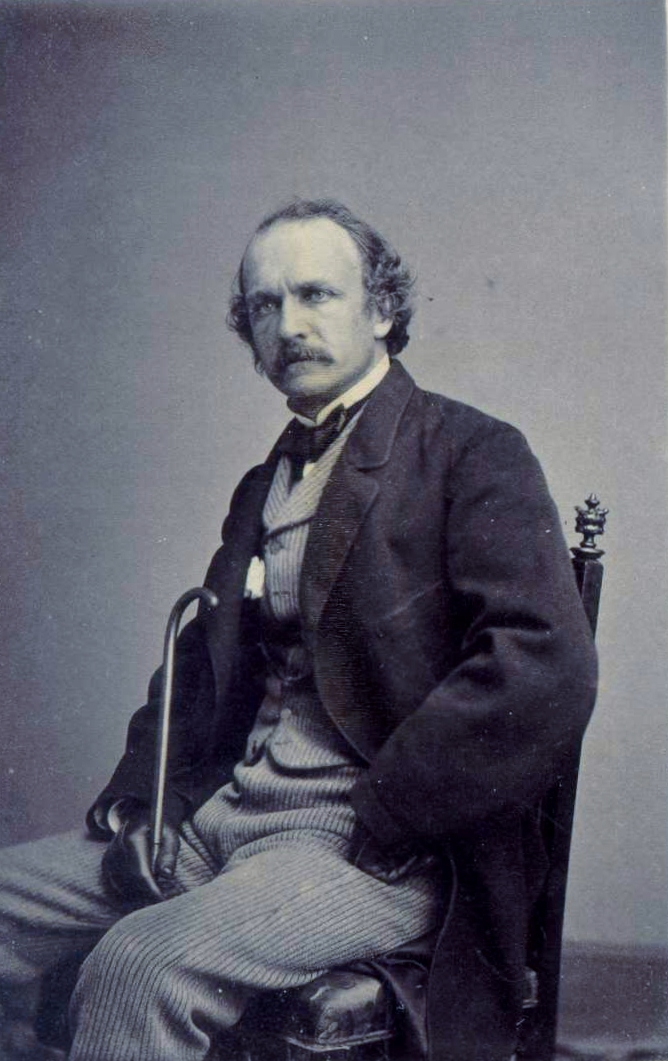
- Born: Felix Octavius Carr Darley; June 23, 1822; Philadelphia, Pennsylvania, U.S.
- Died: March 27, 1888 (aged 65); Claymont, Delaware, U.S.
- Known for: Illustration, painting

Felix Octavius Carr Darley (June 23, 1822 – March 27, 1888), often credited as F. O. C. Darley, was an American illustrator, known for his illustrations in works by well-known 19th-century authors, including James Fenimore Cooper, Charles Dickens, Mary Mapes Dodge, Nathaniel Hawthorne, Washington Irving, George Lippard, Henry Wadsworth Longfellow, Donald Grant Mitchell, Clement Clarke Moore, Francis Parkman, Harriet Beecher Stowe and Nathaniel Parker Willis.

== Biography ==
Darley was born on June 23, 1822, in Philadelphia, Pennsylvania.

Darley's wife, Genny G. Colburn

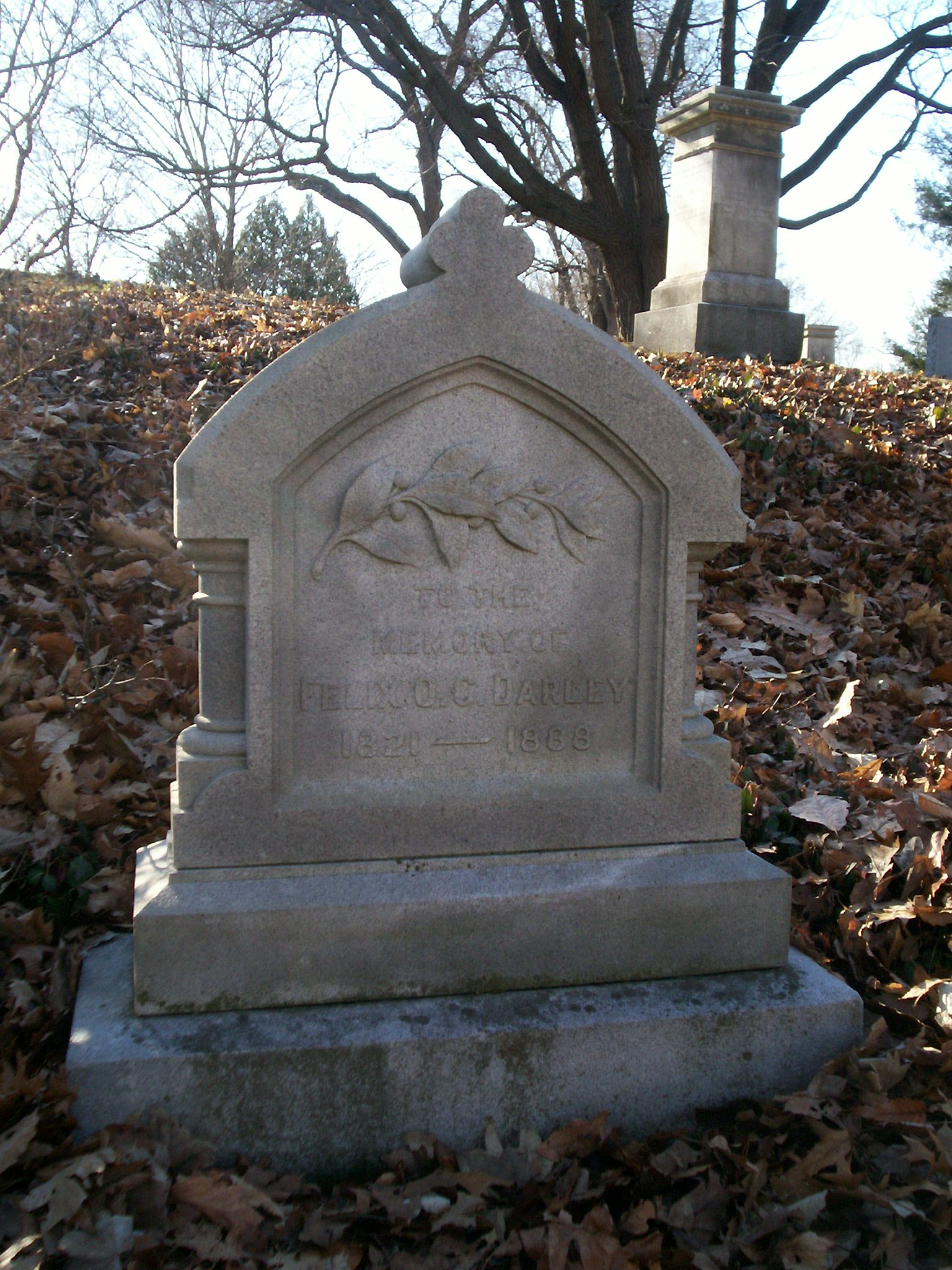
Darley's gravesite at Mount Auburn Cemetery in Cambridge, Massachusetts

Darley was a self-taught and prolific artist who started out as a staff artist for a Philadelphia publishing company, where he was given a wide variety of assignments. He later moved to New York City, and his work began to appear in magazines such as Harper's Weekly and in books by various publishers. Darley made 500 drawings for Benson John Lossing's History of the United States. Among his lithographic illustrations are those for Washington Irving's "The Legend of Sleepy Hollow", and some scenes in Indian life. The swing and vigor of his style, his facility, and versatility and the high average merit of his numerous works, make him one of the most noteworthy of American illustrators.

Darley signed a contract with Edgar Allan Poe on January 31, 1843, to create original illustrations for his upcoming literary journal The Stylus. The contract, which was through July 1, 1844, requested at least three illustrations per month, "on wood or paper as required," but no more than five, for $7 per illustration. The Stylus was never actually produced but Darley provided illustrations for the final installments of the first serial publication of Poe's award-winning tale "The Gold-Bug" later that year.

In 1848, Darley provided the drawings for the first fully illustrated edition of Irving's "Rip Van Winkle", which was printed and distributed by the American Art-Union. That same year, Darley also illustrated an edition of Irving's The Sketch Book of Geoffrey Crayon, Gent. and then his Wolfert's Roost in 1855. In 1851, Darley was elected into the National Academy of Design as an honorary member. In 1852, he was appointed a full academician at the academy.

At the age of thirty-seven, Darley married Jane Colburn in 1859.

Over his career, he produced nearly 350 drawings for James Fenimore Cooper, later collected in a several-volume edition of Cooper's novels printed from 1859 to 1861. In 1868, following a visit to Europe, he published Sketches Abroad with Pen and Pencil. His water color paintings of incidents in American history are full of spirit and include bank-note vignettes.

Darley died in 1888 at his home in Claymont, Delaware, and was buried at Mount Auburn Cemetery in Cambridge, Massachusetts. His Victorian mansion, located in Claymont, is now known as the Darley House and was placed on the National Register of Historic Places in 1974.

== Illustrations ==
"Dick Swiveller and Quilp" from Character Sketches from the Works of Charles Dickens (1888, Porter and Coates, Philadelphia)

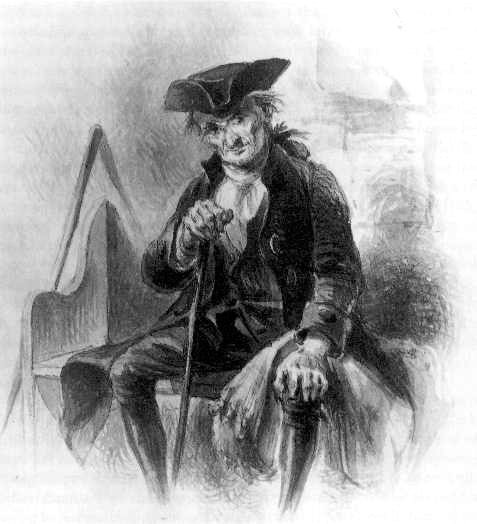
Frontispiece for Washington Irving's A History of New York

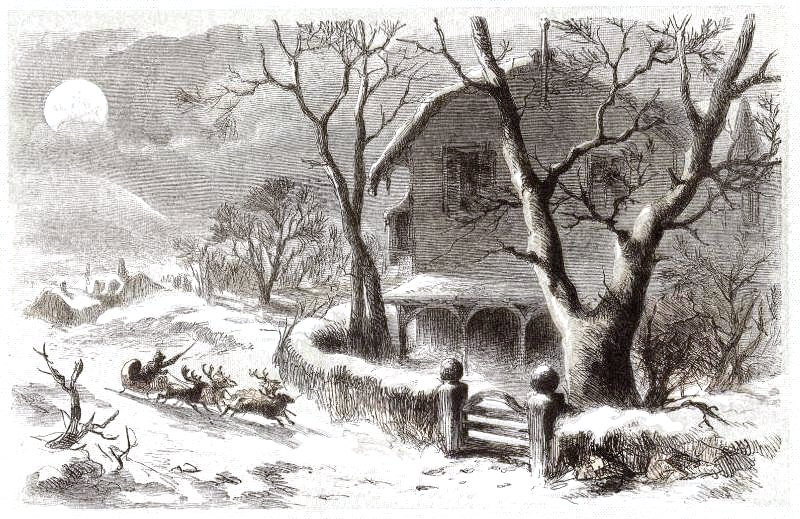
Darley illustration from an 1862 print of A Visit From St. Nicholas by Clement Clarke Moore

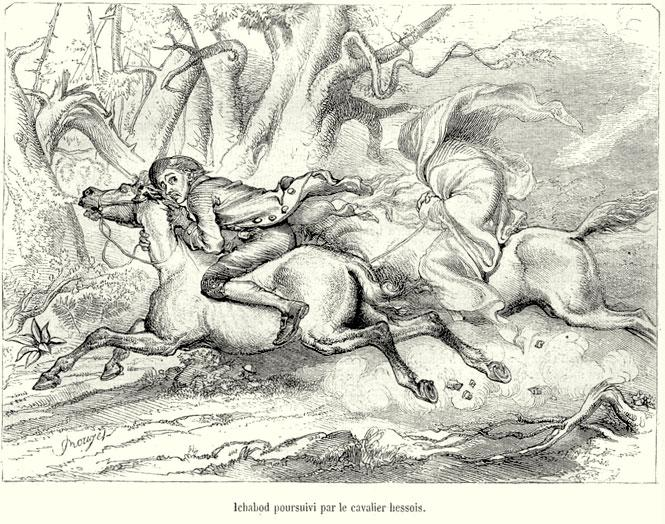
Illustration for Washington Irving's "The Legend of Sleepy Hollow"

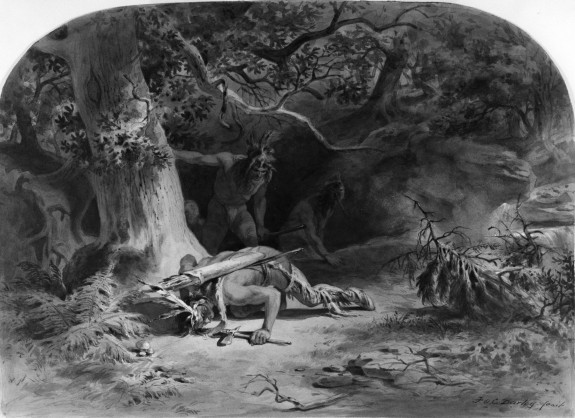
On The Trail, now housed at Walters Art Museum in Baltimore

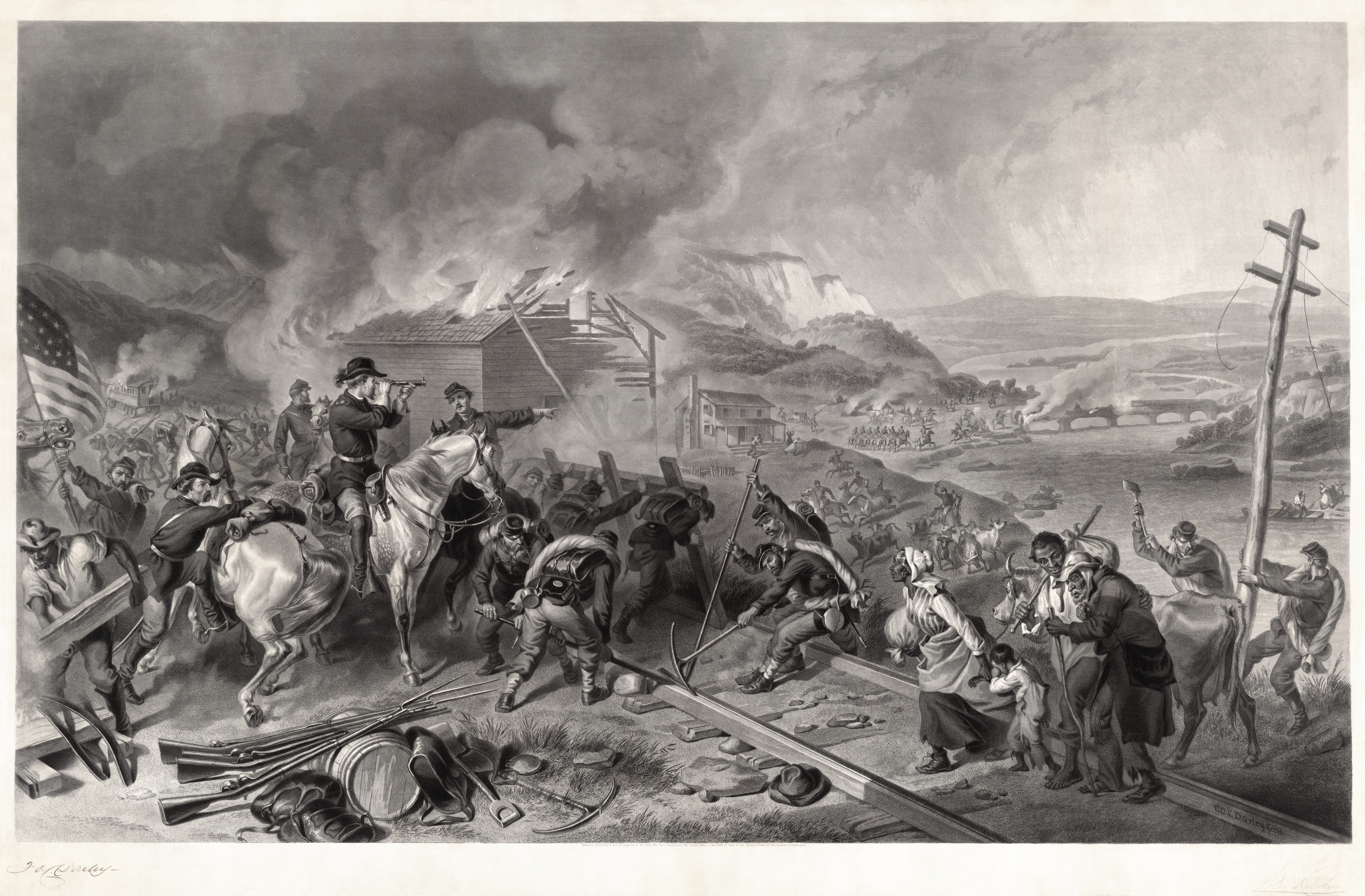
Sherman's March to the Sea, now housed at the Library of Congress in Washington, D.C.

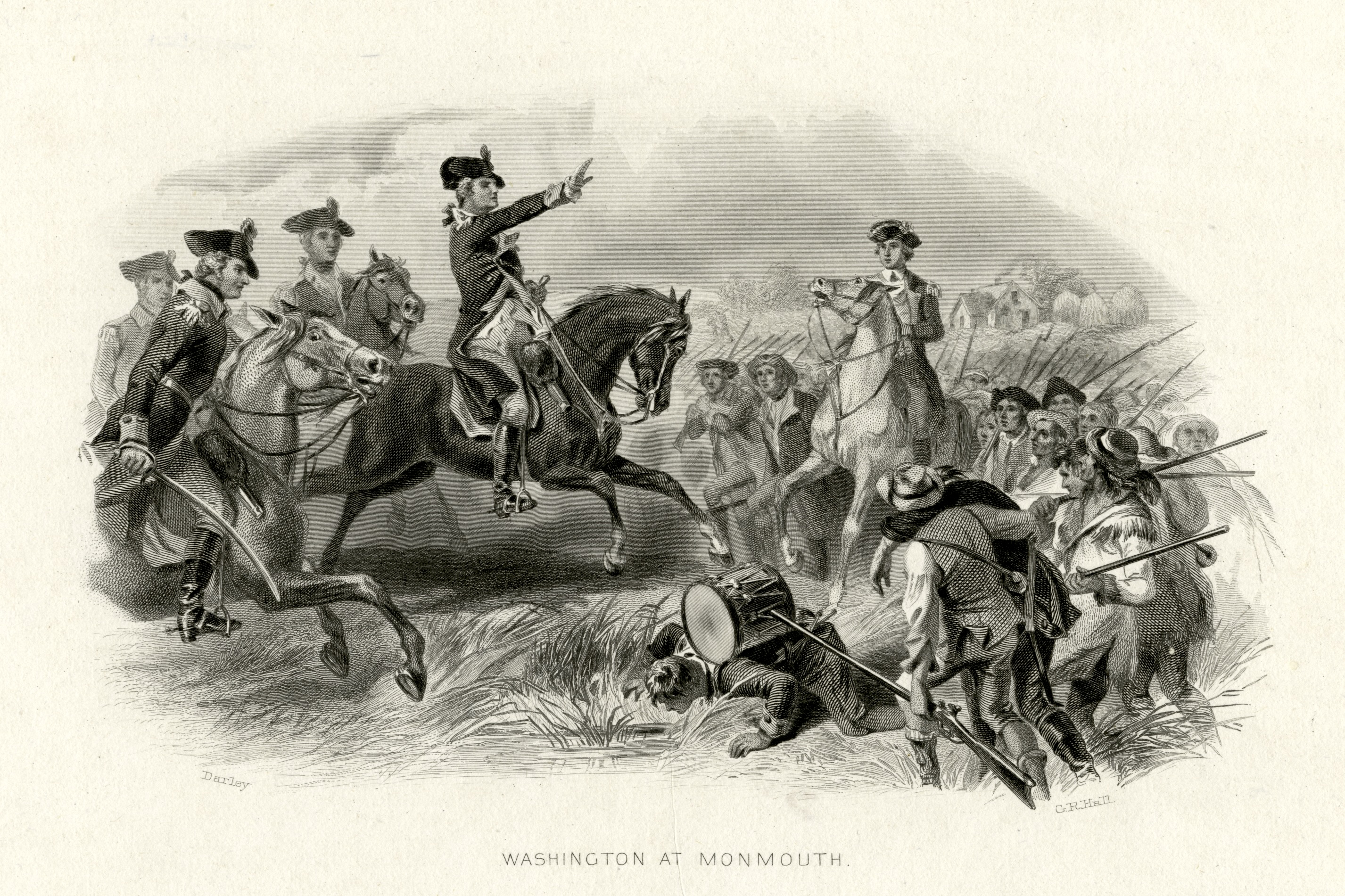
Washington at Monmouth, from Washington Irving's Life of George Washington
