= Claymont, Lexington =

Claymont
- Neighborhood of Lexington, Kentucky
- Interactive map of Claymont
- Coordinates: 38.012°N 84.536°W
- Country: United States
- State: Kentucky
- County: Fayette
- City: Lexington

Area
  - Total: 0.045 sq mi (0.12 km^{2})
  - Water: 0 sq mi (0.0 km^{2})

Population (2000)
  - Total: 100
  - Density: 2,225/sq mi (859/km^{2})
- Time zone: UTC-5 (Eastern (EST))
  - Summer (DST): UTC-4 (EDT)
- ZIP code: 40503
- Area code: 859

Claymont is a neighborhood in southwestern Lexington, Kentucky, United States. Its boundaries are Hill N Dale Road to the north, Clays Mill Road to the west, Pasadena Drive to the south, and Southview Drive to the east.

== Neighborhood statistics ==
- Area: 0.045 square miles (0.12 km^{2})
- Population: 100
- Population density: 2,225 people per square mile
- Median household income (2010): $45,374
