= Union Park Gardens, Wilmington, Delaware =

Coordinates: 39.745°N 75.578°W

Union Park Gardens
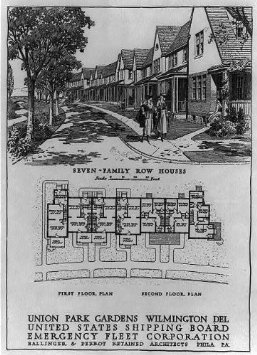
- Location: Wilmington, Delaware
- Area: 58 Acres
- Built: 1918
- Architect: Ballinger & Perrot
- Governing body: City of Wilmington

Union Park Gardens is a neighborhood located between Union Street and Lancaster Avenue in Wilmington, Delaware, United States. It was designed by landscape architect John Nolen and the architect Emile G. Perrot of the firm Ballinger & Perrot during the First World War. Union Park Gardens first served as housing for shipyard workers of the United States Shipping Board's Emergency Fleet Corporation.

== History ==
The Liberty Land Company and Lynch Construction Company built houses in Union Park Gardens for the United States Shipping Board during World War I. The term "Union Park" comes from the name of the amusement park once located on the site of the neighborhood. "The Gardens" name originates from the English Garden Suburb movement of the late 19th Century. "A curved parkway, open spaces, a variety of architectural styles and materials, and the garden-like setting were essential in creating the warm, inviting atmosphere which remains to this day."

On February 27, 1922, the Emergency Fleet Corporation "received $1,573,231 for Union Park Gardens, Wilmington, Del., which was sold recently by the Gerth's Realty Experts," according to an article in the New-York Tribune. "The property sale consisted of all 503 houses, four stores, one store and apartment, one six-family apartment house, one brick building with one store and one apartment and two tracts of ground." The average house sold for $3,000 each.

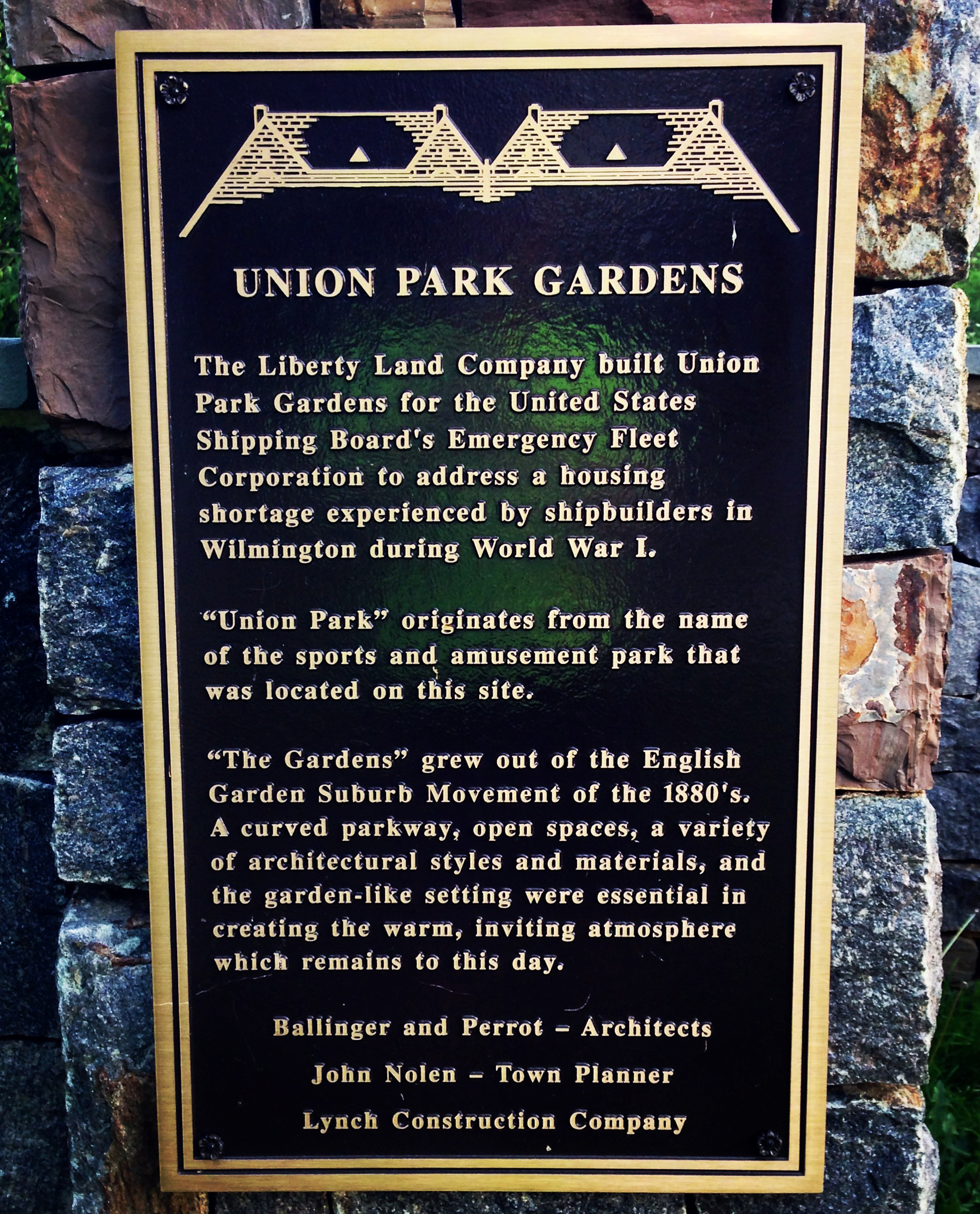
Union Park Gardens Historic Marker.

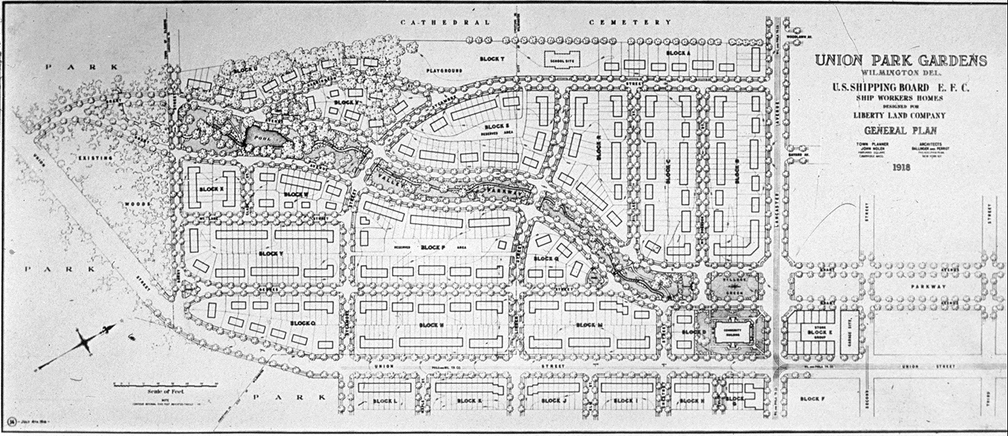
Street layout of Union Park Gardens in Wilmington, Delaware.

== World War II ==
Seven Union Park Garden residents were killed in action during World War II while serving in the United States military. There is a small monument honoring them at the front of the neighborhood. The monument was dedicated during a service on April 19, 1953.
