= Claymont, Delaware =

Census-designated place in Delaware, United States

- CDP
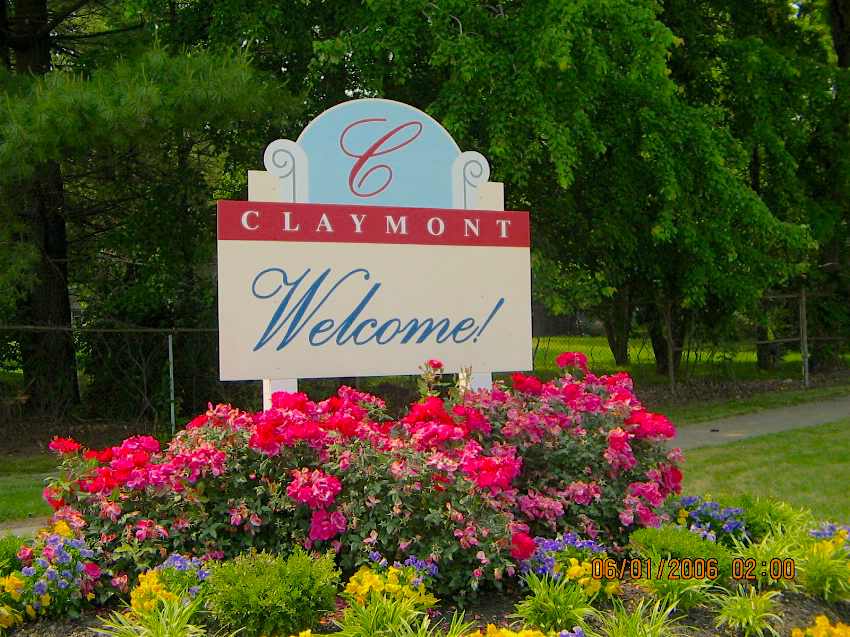
- Claymont welcome sign

- Location of Claymont in New Castle County, Delaware (left) and of New Castle County in Delaware (right)

- Location of Claymont in Delaware Claymont (the United States)
- Coordinates: 39°48′02″N 75°27′35″W
- Country: United States
- State: Delaware
- County: New Castle
- First settled: Before 1200
- Renamed: 1856

Government
  - Type: Claymont Renaissance (de facto)
  - Renaissance President: Basil Kollias, Esq.

Area
  - Total: 2.15 sq mi (5.57 km^{2})
  - Land: 2.15 sq mi (5.57 km^{2})
  - Water: 0 sq mi (0.00 km^{2})
- Elevation: 75 ft (23 m)

Population (2020)
  - Total: 9,895
  - Density: 4,601.2/sq mi (1,776.54/km^{2})
- Time zone: UTC-5 (Eastern (EST))
  - Summer (DST): UTC-4 (EDT)
- ZIP Code: 19703
- Area code: 302
- FIPS code: 10-15310
- GNIS feature ID: 213804
- Website: www.claymontrenaissance.org

Claymont is a census-designated place (CDP) in New Castle County, Delaware, United States. As of the 2020 census, Claymont had a population of 9,895.

== History ==
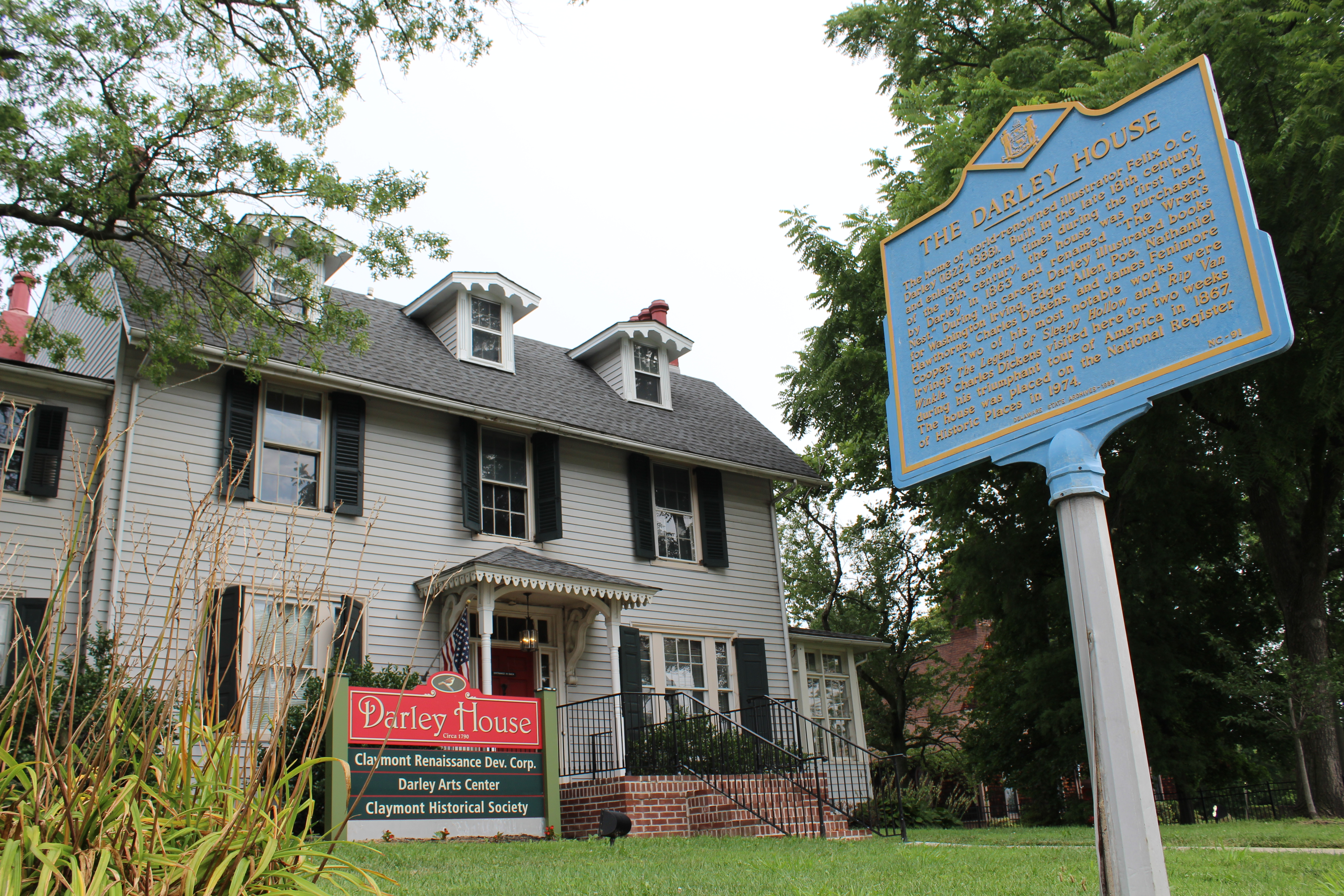
Darley House

The community now known as Claymont started on the banks of Naamans Creek where it empties into the Delaware River. This once rich ecosystem has been occupied steadily since before 1200 A.D. and has undergone numerous cultural and economic changes, most of which are still evident in the architecture and living patterns of the community today. The first residents were aboriginal Indians of the Middle Woodland period (1100–1600 B.C.). Evidence of these early dwellers has been found along both sides of Naamans Creek.

The Dutch colonists named the creek and settlement after the Chief of the Lenape Indians who occupied the region. The settlement grew rapidly from the 17th century through the 20th century, first with gristmills, farms, and related ancillary industries, and later with lumber mills, a steel mill, and a chemical plant.

In 1681, John Grubb purchased a one-third interest in a 600-acre (240 ha) tract of the Brandywine Hundred, which came to be known as Grubb's Landing. Sitting strategically along the Delaware River, Claymont has been a two-way thoroughfare for travel to and from Philadelphia and Washington, D.C., since colonial days.

During the colonial period, the town served as a stop along the King's Highway or Philadelphia Pike. The town became a site for intersections and connections with Interstate 95, Interstate 495, US 13 (Governor Printz Boulevard), and US 13 Bus. Philadelphia Pike has long been a thoroughfare for travel between Philadelphia (20 miles to the north) and Washington, D.C. (100 miles to the south).

In 1838, the newly constructed Philadelphia, Wilmington and Baltimore Railroad built a station in Claymont. The area developed from a primarily agricultural community to a suburban resort area for wealthy Philadelphia families. In the early 20th century, it developed as an industrial working community. It has included the suburban subdivisions of Claymont Addition, Brookview, Worthland, and Woodstream Gardens.

Naamans was renamed as Claymont in 1856 after the Reverend John B. Clemson, pastor of the Episcopal church, relocated here with his family from their plantation, Claymont Court, in Charles Town, West Virginia.

Claymont, with its diverse population, has continued to maintain a strong sense of community. The community's religious, civic, historic, and social organizations play a major role in supporting its unique character.

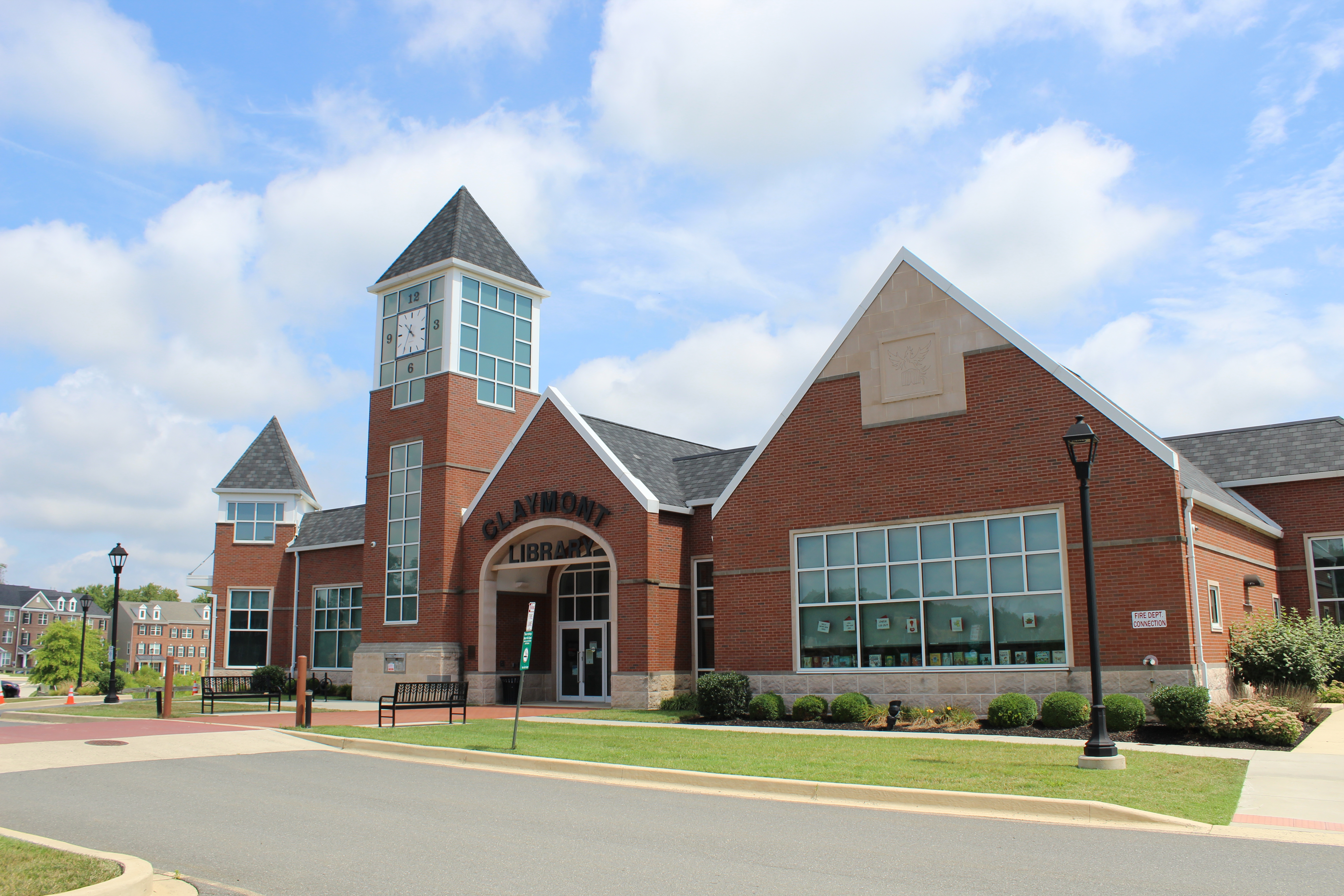
Claymont Library in Claymont, Delaware

=== Renaissance ===
Since the mid-1990s, several major revitalization efforts have been completed, including renovations of such historical sites as the Claymont Stone School, the Darley House and the Robinson House. The Claymont Renaissance Development Corporation, a nonprofit organization working to stimulate economic growth and residential improvement in Claymont, received a Sustainable Communities Award from the National Association of Counties.

In what has been called "the single largest redevelopment project in Brandywine Hundred in the last 40 years", the 633-unit, 66-acre (270,000 m^{2}) community of Brookview was razed beginning in 2007 to make way for the new urbanist, mixed-use Darley Green development. In 2017, plans were announced for the redevelopment of the former 450-acre Claymont Steel site. In 2019 construction began on the $71M Claymont Regional Transportation Center, which will replace the current small commuter rail stop one half mile to the south.

== Geography ==
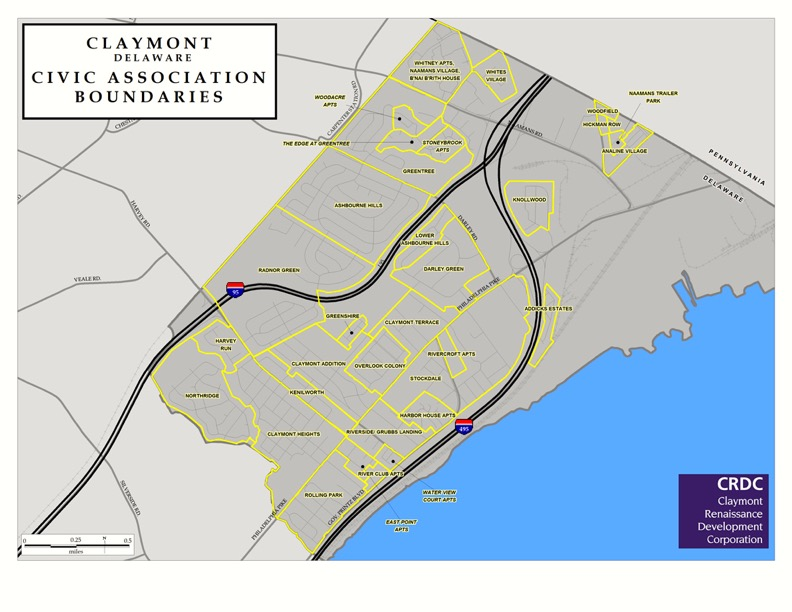
Neighborhoods of Claymont

Claymont is located at 39°48′02″N 75°27′35″W (39.8006685, -75.4596404), in northeastern Brandywine Hundred, on the ridge line between the coastal floodplain of the Delaware River and the upland piedmont area of northwestern New Castle County.

The area generally considered to be Claymont encompasses the entire 19703 ZIP code, which is bounded by the Pennsylvania border to the north, the Delaware River to the east, the CSX railroad line to the west, and Perkins Run creek to the south.

== Law and government ==
=== County representation ===
The New Castle County Government operates under an executive-council form of municipal government. The county is headed by a County Executive, who is elected to a maximum of two consecutive, four-year terms. The Chief Administrative Officer, who is the county's second-in-command, is appointed by the County Executive and serves at his or her pleasure. The current County Executive is Matt Meyer, and the current Chief Administrative Officer is Vanessa Phillips.

The county's legislative body is a thirteen-member County Council, consisting of twelve members elected by district and one Council President elected at large. Claymont falls within New Castle County District 8, which is represented by Councilman John Cartier.

=== State representation ===
Claymont is in the 7th District of the Delaware House of Representatives, and is in the 1st District of the Delaware Senate. Both members of the Democratic Party, Larry Lambert represents Delaware House District 7, and Dan Cruce represents Senate District 1.

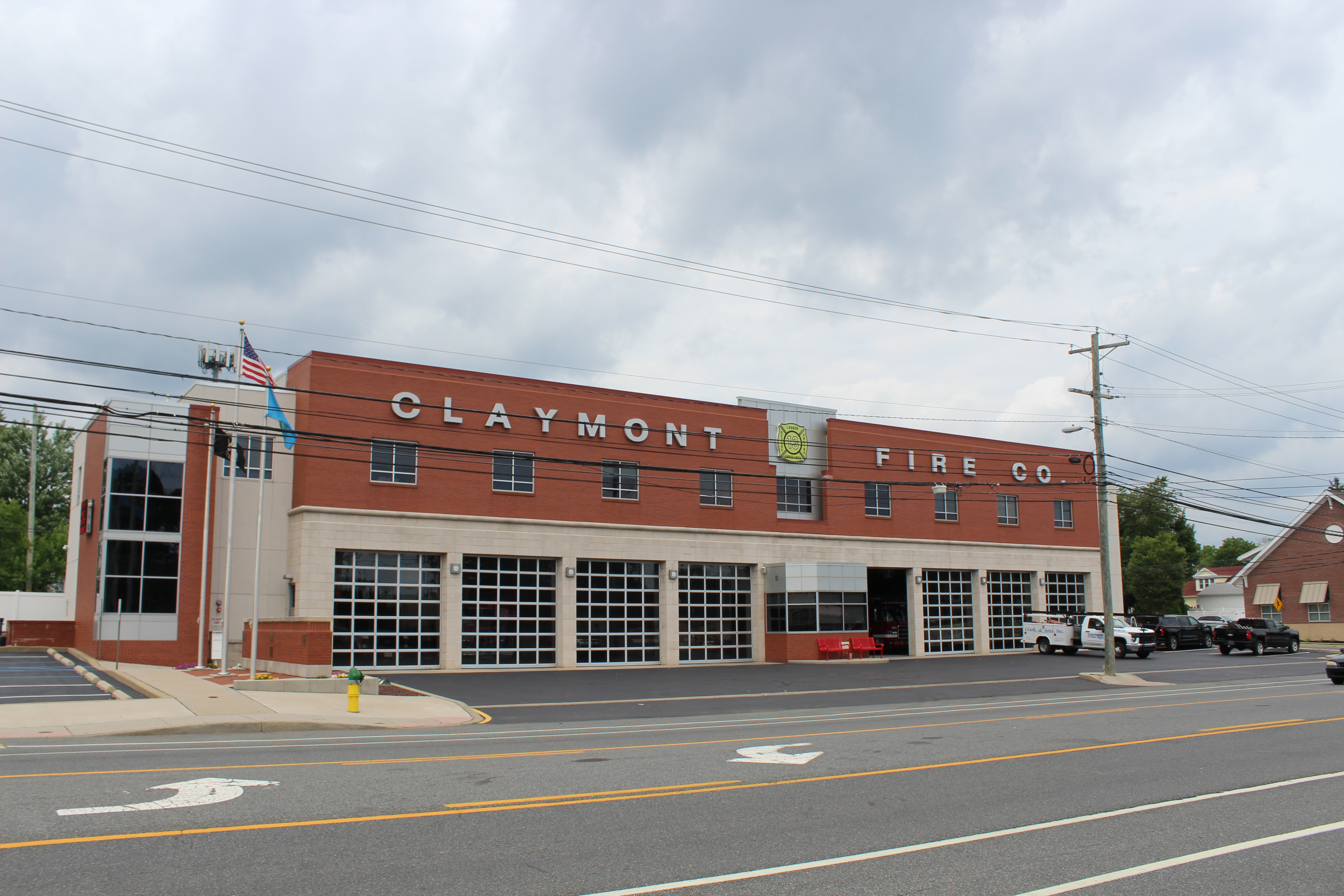
Claymont Fire Co. in Claymont, Delaware.

=== Federal representation ===
Democratic Congresswoman Sarah McBride represents the State of Delaware in its entirety.

Claymont is represented in the United States Senate by Democrats Lisa Blunt Rochester and Chris Coons.

The United States Postal Service has an office on Philadelphia Pike in Claymont.

=== Fire ===
The Claymont Fire Co. has two locations, one of which is located in Claymont on Philadelphia Pike.

=== Police ===
The New Castle County Division of Police has jurisdiction over all unincorporated areas in New Castle County, Delaware. The department has about 400 law enforcement officers. The current Chief of Police is Vaughn Bond. Claymont is also under the jurisdiction of the Delaware State Police.

== Demographics ==
Historical population
| Census | Pop. | Note | %± |
|---|---|---|---|
| 2000 | 9,220 | | — |
| 2010 | 8,253 | | −10.5% |
| 2020 | 9,895 | | 19.9% |
U.S. Decennial Census

=== Racial and ethnic composition ===
Claymont CDP, Delaware – Racial and ethnic composition Note: the US Census treats Hispanic/Latino as an ethnic category. This table excludes Latinos from the racial categories and assigns them to a separate category. Hispanics/Latinos may be of any race.
| Race / Ethnicity (NH = Non-Hispanic) | Pop 2000 | Pop 2010 | Pop 2020 | % 2000 | % 2010 | % 2020 |
|---|---|---|---|---|---|---|
| White alone (NH) | 6,392 | 5,028 | 4,725 | 69.33% | 60.92% | 47.75% |
| Black or African American alone (NH) | 2,123 | 2,176 | 2,801 | 23.03% | 26.37% | 28.31% |
| Native American or Alaska Native alone (NH) | 26 | 15 | 38 | 0.28% | 0.18% | 0.38% |
| Asian alone (NH) | 128 | 305 | 729 | 1.39% | 3.70% | 7.37% |
| Native Hawaiian or Pacific Islander alone (NH) | 2 | 2 | 3 | 0.02% | 0.02% | 0.03% |
| Other race alone (NH) | 13 | 9 | 49 | 0.14% | 0.11% | 0.50% |
| Mixed race or Multiracial (NH) | 151 | 134 | 449 | 1.64% | 1.62% | 4.54% |
| Hispanic or Latino (any race) | 385 | 584 | 1,101 | 4.18% | 7.08% | 11.13% |
| Total | 9,220 | 8,253 | 9,895 | 100.00% | 100.00% | 100.00% |

=== 2020 census ===
As of the 2020 census, Claymont had a population of 9,895. The median age was 36.7 years. 22.4% of residents were under the age of 18 and 13.1% of residents were 65 years of age or older. For every 100 females there were 92.5 males, and for every 100 females age 18 and over there were 90.1 males age 18 and over.

100.0% of residents lived in urban areas, while 0.0% lived in rural areas.

There were 4,066 households in Claymont, of which 29.4% had children under the age of 18 living in them. Of all households, 37.0% were married-couple households, 21.7% were households with a male householder and no spouse or partner present, and 32.2% were households with a female householder and no spouse or partner present. About 30.3% of all households were made up of individuals and 9.1% had someone living alone who was 65 years of age or older.

There were 4,319 housing units, of which 5.9% were vacant. The homeowner vacancy rate was 1.6% and the rental vacancy rate was 5.5%.

Racial composition as of the 2020 census
| Race | Number | Percent |
|---|---|---|
| White | 4,850 | 49.0% |
| Black or African American | 2,905 | 29.4% |
| American Indian and Alaska Native | 50 | 0.5% |
| Asian | 733 | 7.4% |
| Native Hawaiian and Other Pacific Islander | 3 | 0.0% |
| Some other race | 577 | 5.8% |
| Two or more races | 777 | 7.9% |

=== 2010 census ===
The ZIP Code Tabulation Area for 19703 includes communities such as Ashbourne Hills, the Greentree section, the Society Hill Section, and parts of Rolling Park, which are neighborhoods located within Claymont. The area had a population of 14,471 with a total of 5,984 households at the 2010 Census. The racial makeup of the area was 61.83% White, 31.41% African American, 7.72% Hispanic, 0.89% Native American, 4.75% Asian, 0.12% Pacific Islander, and 3.48% from other races. As of 2010, the median household income for the 19703 ZIP code was $58,304 with an average of 2.42 persons per household.

== Education ==
Claymont is in the Brandywine School District. Zoned schools are as follows:

- Most of the CDP is zoned to Claymont Elementary School, while parts are zoned to Maple Lane Elementary School and to Forwood Elementary School.
- Most areas are zoned to Talley Middle School, while some are zoned to P. S. DuPont Middle School.
- Much of Claymont CDP is zoned to Brandywine High School while some of the CDP is zoned to Mount Pleasant High School.

Archmere Academy, a private school, is in Claymont.

The current Claymont Library, operated by New Castle County Libraries, opened in 2013.

Previously Claymont was in the Claymont School District. The Delaware General Assembly established the Claymont Special School District on June 24, 1920, and that district was reorganized into the Claymont School District on July 1, 1969. That district merged into the New Castle County School District in 1978. That district was divided into four districts, among them the Brandywine district, in 1981.

Prior to educational desegregation in the mid-20th century, African-American children in Claymont went to Howard High School in Wilmington.

== Transportation ==
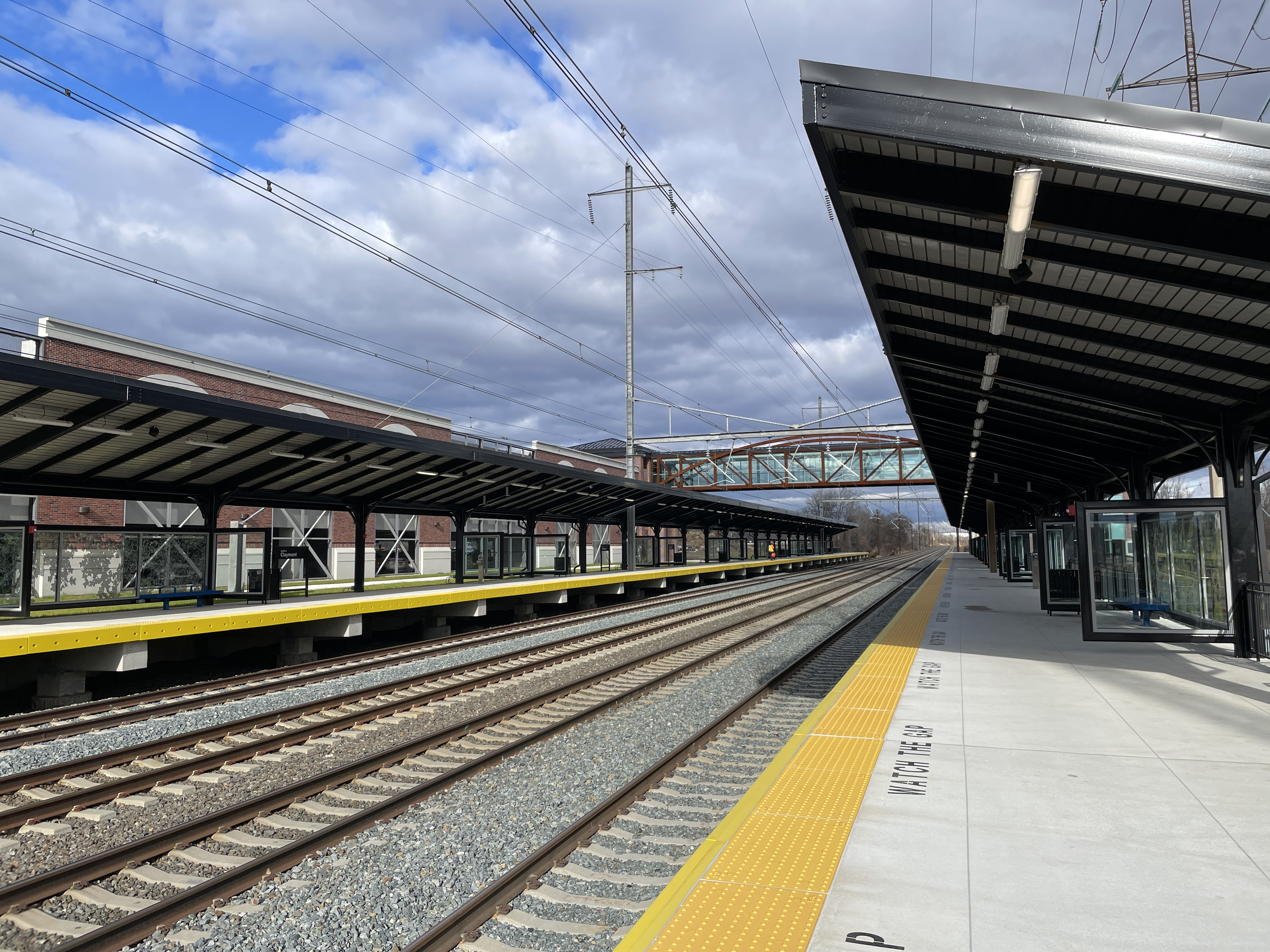
Claymont Station, which serves SEPTA Regional Rail's Wilmington/Newark Line

Major roads that serve Claymont include Interstate 95, Interstate 495, US 13 (Governor Printz Boulevard), US 13 Bus. (Philadelphia Pike), and DE 92 (Naamans Road). Claymont Station is a SEPTA Regional Rail train station on the Wilmington/Newark Line, providing service north to Center City Philadelphia and south to Wilmington and Newark. Trains along Amtrak's Northeast Corridor pass through Claymont but do not stop; the nearest Amtrak station is Wilmington Station. DART First State provides bus service to Claymont along Route 13, which runs from the Claymont Station south along Philadelphia Pike to Wilmington; and Route 61, which runs from the Claymont Station west along Naamans Road to the Brandywine Town Center. SEPTA Suburban Bus Route 113 runs from the Claymont Station north into Delaware County, Pennsylvania, providing service to the Chester Transit Center in Chester, the Darby Transportation Center in Darby, and the 69th Street Transportation Center in Upper Darby.

== Places of interest ==
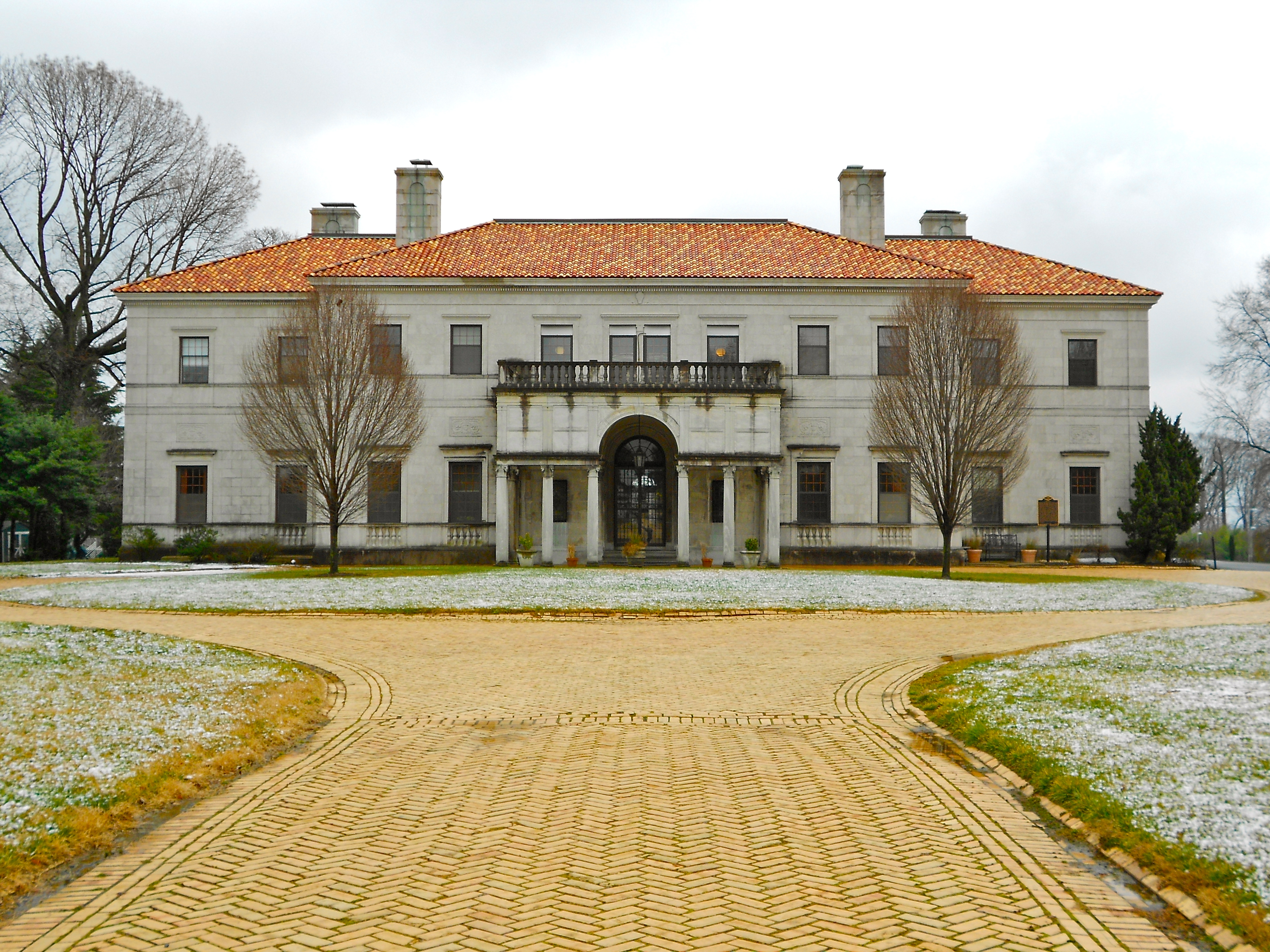
Archmere Academy

Claymont is home to several historic places, including the Claymont Stone School, est. 1805, which may have been the state's first racially integrated public school; Archmere Academy, est. 1916, in the former home of industrialist John J. Raskob; the Darley House, est. 1859, former home of illustrator F. O. C. Darley; the Grubb/Worth Mansion, erected in 1783; and the Robinson House, with a Block House believed to be the only structure remaining of the original Naaman's Creek settlement.

== Notable people ==
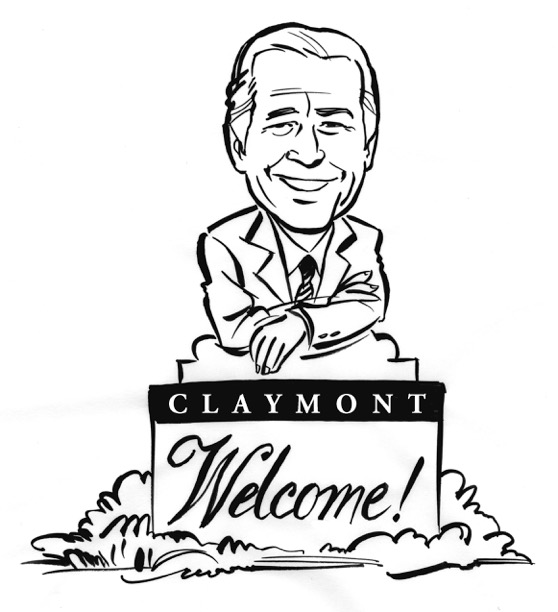
President Joe Biden moved to Claymont from Scranton, Pennsylvania in his early youth

- Valerie Bertinelli, One Day at a Time and Touched by an Angel actress
- Joe Biden, 46th President of the United States and former U.S. Senator and Vice President
- Keasel Broome, soccer player
- John Carney, Governor of Delaware
- J. Caleb Boggs, former Governor of Delaware, U.S. Representative, and U.S. Senator
- F. O. C. Darley, known as the "Father of American Illustration"
- John Grubb, two-term member of the Pennsylvania Provincial Assembly, one of the original settlers of Claymont
- Nathaniel Grubb, served in the Pennsylvania Colonial Assembly
- Keith "Bang Bang" McCurdy, celebrity tattoo artist
- John J. Raskob, DuPont and General Motors executive
- Adolf Ulric Wertmüller, Swedish portrait painter
