= Grubb =

Grubb is a surname. Notable people with the surname include:

- Armstead Otey Grubb (1903–1968), American educator and acting president of Lincoln University
- Catharina Elisabet Grubb (1721–1788), Finnish industrialist
- Curtis Grubb (c. 1730–1789), American patriot and politician, majority owner and operator of the Cornwall Iron Works, son of Peter Grubb, the Works' founder
- Dale Grubb (born 1949), American politician
- Davis Grubb (1919–1980), American writer
- Edward Grubb (disambiguation)
- Evelyn Grubb, American human rights and veterans' rights activist
- Freddie Grubb (1887–1949), British road racing cyclist and businessman
- Gerd Grubb (born 1939), Danish mathematician
- George Grubb, Lord Provost and ex officio Lord-Lieutenant of Edinburgh
- Gunnila Grubb (1692–1729), was a Swedish composer
- Henry Bates Grubb (1774–1823), founder of the Grubb iron empire, son of Peter Grubb, Jr.
- Howard Grubb (1844–1931), Irish telescope maker
- Ignatius Cooper Grubb (1841–1927), American politician, jurist and historian
- James Grubb (1771–1806), American politician
- Jeff Grubb (born 1957), author and game designer
- Jehu Grubb (c. 1781–1854), American settler and member of the Ohio House of Representatives, unacknowledged son of Curtis Grubb
- Jennifer Grubb, American soccer player and coach
- John Grubb (1652–1708), early Delaware settler and member of the Pennsylvania Provincial Assembly
- Johnny Grubb (born 1948), former Major League Baseball player
- Kenneth Philip Grubb (1895–1976), United States District Court judge
- Kevin Grubb (1978–2009), NASCAR driver
- Lillian Metge (1871–1954), née Grubb, Anglo-Irish suffragette and women's rights campaigner
- Margaret Grubb (1907–1963), first wife of Scientology founder L. Ron Hubbard
- Nathaniel Grubb (c. 1693–1760), mill owner and member of the Pennsylvania Colonial Assembly from 1749 to 1758
- Norman Grubb (1895–1993), missionary and General Secretary of the Worldwide Evangelization Crusade
- Ole W. Grubb (1891–1981), American politician
- Peter Grubb (disambiguation)
- Robert Grubb (born 1950), Australian actor
- Sarah Grubb (1746–1832), Irish businesswoman and Quaker benefactor
- Sarah Tuke Grubb (1756–1790), Quaker minister, writer and founder of a girls' school in Ireland
- Sophie Naylor Grubb (1834–1902), American activist
- Thomas Grubb (1800–1878), Irish optician
- Warner Norton Grubb (1900–1947), American petroleum executive and senior petroleum distribution officer with the U.S. Navy during World War II
- Wayne Grubb (born 1976), former NASCAR driver
- William Irwin Grubb (1862–1935), U.S. federal judge who struck down key portions of President Roosevelt's New Deal

== See also ==
- Judge Grubb (disambiguation)
