= Robert E. Wright =

American historian (born 1969)

- Born: Robert Eric Wright; January 1, 1969 (age 57); Rochester, N.Y.

Academic background
- Education: University at Buffalo

Academic work
- Discipline: Economic history of America
- Institutions: Augustana University, Sioux Falls, South Dakota

Robert Eric Wright (born January 1, 1969 in Rochester, N.Y.) is a business, economic, financial, and monetary historian and the inaugural Rudy and Marilyn Nef Family Chair of Political Economy at Augustana University in Sioux Falls, South Dakota. He is also a research economist at the National Bureau of Economic Research.

== Education ==
After graduating from Fairport High School in 1987, Wright took degrees in History from Buffalo State College, where he was a member of the All-College Honors Program, and the University at Buffalo (Ph.D., 1997).

== Research ==
Since 2001, he has authored, co-authored, edited, or co-edited twenty books on topics including banks and banking, book publishing, construction, corporations, corporate genealogy, and corporate governance, economic indicators, entrepreneurship, government bailouts, insurance, money and monetary policy, public debts, public policies, and securities markets.

Wright's writings include a book on the role the real estate mortgage crisis of the 1760s played in the American Revolution.

Wright is a board member of Historians Against Slavery, an NGO. He edits its books series with Cambridge University Press, "Slaveries Since Emancipation," and serves on HAS's public speakers bureau. He is also associated with the Museum of American Finance.

Wright taught at New York University's Stern School of Business from 2003 until 2009. Before that, Wright taught economics at the University of Virginia, where he worked with Virginia economist Ron Michener in a dispute against Dr. Farley Grubb, an economist at the University of Delaware, over the nature of colonial and early U.S. money and monetary systems.

== Selected bibliography ==
=== Books ===
- Wright, Robert E. (2001). Origins of Commercial Banking in America, 1750–1800. Lanham, Maryland: Rowman & Littlefield. ISBN 9780742520875.
- Wright, Robert E. (2002). Hamilton Unbound: Finance and the Creation of the American Republic. Westport, Connecticut: Greenwood Press. ISBN 9780275978167.
- Wright, Robert E.; Cowen, David J. (2006). Financial Founding Fathers: the Men Who Made America Rich. Chicago: University of Chicago Press. ISBN 9780226910680.
- Wright, Robert E. (2008). One Nation Under Debt: Hamilton, Jefferson, and the History of What We Owe. New York: McGraw-Hill. ISBN 9780071543934.
- Wright, Robert E. (2010). Bailouts: Public Money, Private Profit. New York: Columbia University Press. ISBN 9780231521734.
- Wright, Robert E. (2014). Corporation Nation. Philadelphia: University of Pennsylvania Press. ISBN 9780812245646.
- Wright, Robert E.; Sylla, Richard E. (2015). Genealogy of American finance. New York: Columbia University Press. ISBN 9780231170260.
- Wright, Robert E. (2017). Poverty of Slavery: How Unfree Labor Pollutes the Economy. Palgrave Macmillan ISBN 978-3-319-48968-1.

=== Book chapters ===
- Wright, Robert E. (2012). "Capitalism in Early America: Rise of the Corporation Nation." In Gary Kornblith and Michael Zakim, eds., Capitalism Takes Command: The Social Transformation of Nineteenth Century America. Chicago: University of Chicago Press. ISBN 9780226451107.

=== Journal articles ===
- Wright, Robert E.; Kingston, Christopher. (2010) "The Deadliest of Games: The Institution of Dueling," Southern Economic Journal 76, 4:1094-1106.

=== News articles ===
- Wright, Robert E. (2008-03-18). "The party's over; Democrats and Republicans offer no choice when it comes to the economy. Let's start fresh". Pqasb.pqarchiver.com.
- Wright, Robert E. (December 2008). "Financial crisis and reform - The McKinsey Quarterly - Financial crisis and reform: Looking back for clues to the future - Strategy - Strategic Thinking". The McKinsey Quarterly.
