= John Grubb =

Member, Provincial Assembly
- In office 1692 and 1698

Personal details
- Born: August 15, 1652 Stoke Climsland, Cornwall
- Died: March 1708 (aged 55) Marcus Hook, Pennsylvania
- Profession: Tanner

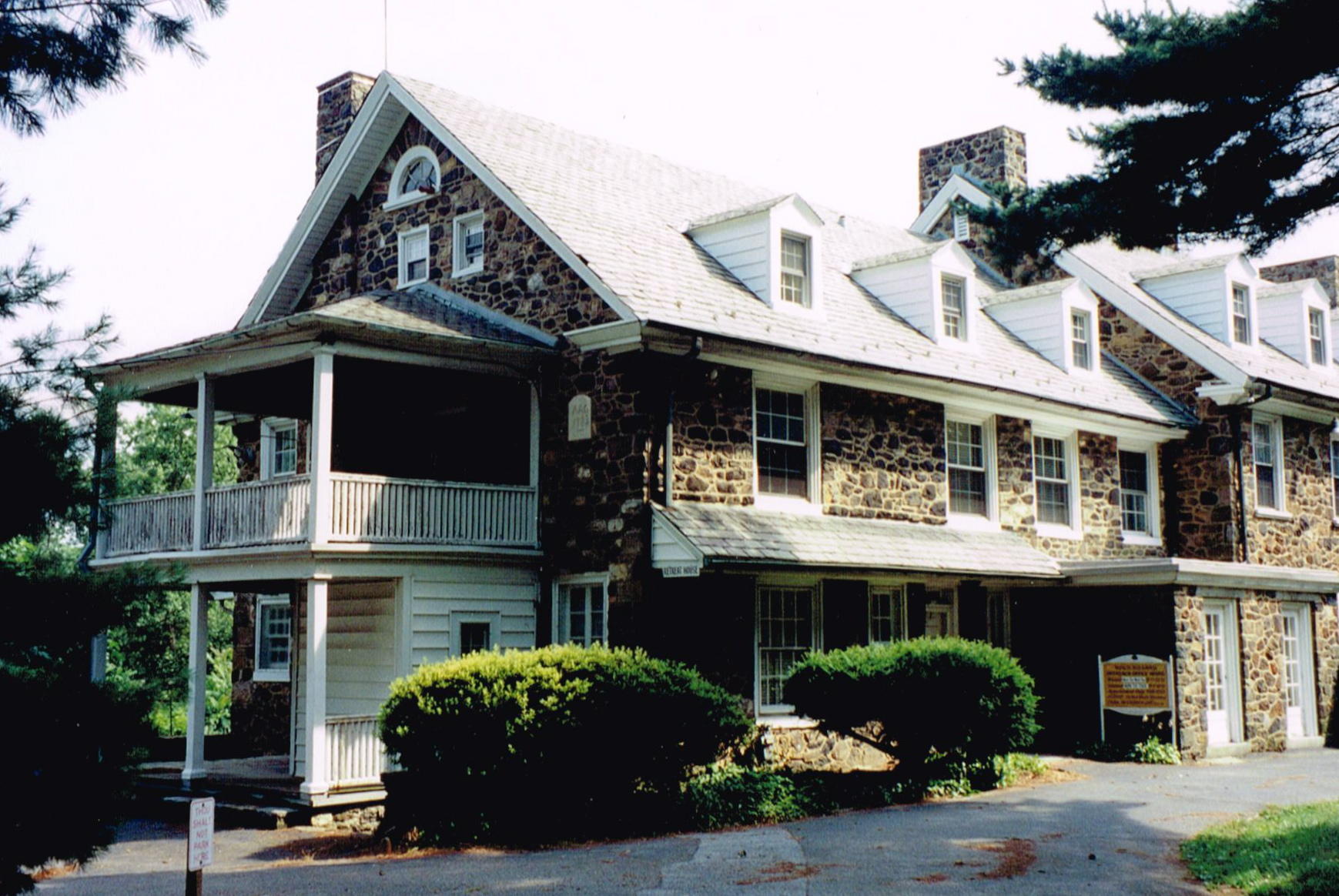
John Grubb's house was often rebuilt and expanded. In 1919, it became known as the Grubb Worth house and today it serves as the administrative office for the Holy Rosary Church in Claymont, Delaware

John Grubb (1652–1708) was a two-term member of the Pennsylvania Provincial Assembly and was one of the original settlers in a portion of Brandywine Hundred that became Claymont, Delaware. He founded a large tannery that continued in operation for over 100 years at what became known as Grubb's Landing. He was also one of the 150 signers of the Concessions and Agreements for province of West Jersey.

Born in Stoke Climsland, Cornwall, he was the 4th son of Henry Grubb Jr. and Wilmot (maiden name unknown). Henry was an early Quaker who was imprisoned several times for his beliefs. With no chance of being established in his home village, John and his older brother Henry emigrated to the West Jersey colony in 1677 on the Kent, the first ship of settlers organized by William Penn. While he arrived without the funds required to buy his own land, by 1682, he earned enough money to acquire a one-third interest in a 600-acre (2.4 km^{2}) tract on Naaman's Creek in Brandywine Hundred where he built his tannery. John was one of the early settlers who greeted William Penn in 1682 when he arrived in New Castle before he founded Philadelphia. Ultimately Penn and Grubb clashed over property they jointly owned and were unable to settle the dispute in their lifetimes.

In the early 1700s, John Grubb moved to Marcus Hook, Pennsylvania, where he died in 1708. At that time, John owned 500 acres, which was typical of the early settlers to the Delaware Valley. He was survived by his wife, Frances and nine children. The Grubb Family extensively researched her origins and concluded that there is no primary evidence that establishes her maiden name or when they were married.

== Biography ==
=== Early years in Cornwall ===
The Grubb family was first recorded in Stoke Climsland, Cornwall in 1329 and over the centuries lived in the small village as tenant farmers and trades people. John's father, Henry Grubb Jr. (1617 – before 1677) was a butcher who rented a small piece of land. He was also an early Quaker who was imprisoned in January 1663/4 for his beliefs. He had eight known children, including at least seven with his second wife, Wilmot (maiden named unknown)(c.1625 – 1698). Christened in Stoke Climsland on August 16, 1652, John was Henry's fourth known son. In his youth, John apprenticed as a tanner with the Hawkins family, Stoke Climsland Quakers closely associated with the Grubb family.

=== 1677 - Sailing on the Kent ===
By the mid-1670s, the Society of Friends faced a crisis: two-thirds of Quaker children were migrating to the cities and leaving the church because Quaker parents found it too expensive to establish their children when they came of age. To Quaker leaders including William Penn, the solution was to create a colony across the Atlantic in West Jersey where land could be made available inexpensively.

Settlement of West Jersey began in 1675 when Major John Fenwick, one of the two original Quaker purchasers of West Jersey, sailed on the Griffen and founded Salem, across the river from New Castle, Delaware. Fenwick quickly experienced problems with almost everyone including Edward Byllynge (the other purchaser of West Jersey), and Governor Andros in New York. A number of the Salem settlers became disenchanted with Fenwick and relocated across the Delaware to the Brandywine region on the modern border between Pennsylvania and Delaware. William Penn was appointed as trustee to settle Byllynge's financial difficulties and decided to organize settlers to populate Byllynge's portion of West Jersey. Penn sent letters to Quaker Meetings announcing his intention to lease ships beginning with the Kent leaving in the late spring of 1677.

By 1677, John's father was dead and his widow, Wilmot, lived with her oldest son, Anthony and his family. John finished his apprenticeship about the time the small Quaker Meeting in Stoke Climsland heard about William Penn's plans for West Jersey. The Meeting organized a small contingent of young adults from Stoke Climsland to sail on the Kent. The fare was high: five pounds, but for only another five pounds John could buy enough land in the Delaware Valley for a tannery and a decent sized farm. John's brother Henry could not pay the fare and agreed to become an indentured servant for three years.

After picking up passengers from the Yorkshire port city of Hull, the Kent sailed from London in late spring with 230 settlers and landed outside of Salem. While some of the Kent's passengers settled in Salem, most remained with the ship when it sailed up the Delaware River and established Burlington, West Jersey. Henry and John Grubb and the rest of the Stoke Climsland group remained in Salem. Penn himself remained in England for another five years.

Shortly after the arrival of the Kent, John Grubb became one of the 150 individuals involved with the West Jersey venture to sign the West Jersey Concessions and Agreements. Largely based on the ideas of Edward Byllynge, a radical republican, West Jersey's governing document was one of the most democratic constitutions of the colonial period. In August 1676, the trustees and the proprietors first signed this constitution in London. A year later, the resident proprietors and other West Jersey inhabitants signed the constitution just after the Kent arrived. The fact that John was one of the signatories was not unusual because almost every free adult male in the colony at that time also signed. However, as an indentured servant, Henry Grubb was not one of the signatories. After he finished his three-year indenture, Henry moved to Burlington where he opened a tavern and became an elected official. He was survived by two daughters.

=== 1678 - 1681 ===
In 1678, Robert Wade, one of the Griffen settlers who left Salem for Brandywine, purchased 500 acres on the south side of Upland Creek. That July, John Grubb and his friend Richard Buffington entered into an agreement with Wade to farm this property. Upland was a small settlement across the river from Salem and several miles north of the modern border between Delaware and Pennsylvania. At that time, the European population of the entire Brandywine region including Upland consisted of only several hundred, mostly Dutch and Swedes. Wade erected a large house that became the first regular meeting place for Quakers in what was to become Pennsylvania. The next year, Grubb and Buffington used their earnings to acquire their own property. On November 25, 1679, they recorded at Upland Court their joint purchase of a 340-acre (1.4 km^{2}) tract on the southwest side of Upland Creek adjacent to Wade's property. Wade also wanted this property. While William Penn had not yet received the charter for Pennsylvania, by 1680 Penn's intentions were commonly known. Upland was the leading candidate to become the capital of Penn's colony and the Upland Creek tract would have become prime property.

Wade accused Grubb and Buffington of breach of contract and embezzling his grain. After arbitration failed, the court at New Castle heard the charges in December 1680, and the jury found for the defendants, Grubb and Buffington. This didn't end the matter, and shortly thereafter Wade was in possession of the Grubb-Buffington tract. Historian Gilbert Cope speculates that they transferred their property to Wade in repayment of some debt. However, this seems improbable because Grubb and Buffington won the court case. It is more likely that Wade made Grubb and Buffington an attractive offer for the property. While Wade made an attempt to convince William Penn's agents to establish the new colony's capital at Upland, Penn announced his decision to establish Philadelphia further upriver. As a result, Wade's tract did not become as valuable as Wade had hoped.

John's dispute with Robert Wade is probably the reason there has been considerable confusion concerning John's religion. All of his known actions until this dispute suggest that he was a Quaker until then. He probably became an inactive Quaker about 1680 because Wade was the most prominent Quaker on the west side of the Delaware River and the only meeting place was in his house.

=== Grubb's Landing, Delaware ===
After selling the tract in Upland, John acquired a one-third interest in a 600-acre (2.4 km^{2}) tract on the Delaware River at Naaman's Creek in modern Claymont, Delaware, just south of Marcus Hook, Pennsylvania. This tract was jointly owned with two Dutchmen, Isaac Savoy and David Bilderbeck. The Naaman's Creek tract was the beginning of what would be the Grubb family's homestead for almost 300 years. Buffington acquired his own tract on Brandywine Creek in East Bradford, Pennsylvania. William Penn was granted the charter for Pennsylvania in 1681, and sailed from England the next year. Just before he left, Penn purchased Delaware from the Duke of York because the Duke decided that it was too troublesome to administer Delaware from New York. Penn arrived at New Castle on October 29, 1682, and was met by a group of early settlers, including John Grubb.

One of the early tasks of the new colony was to record tracts owned by the few settlers already in the area. On September 19, 1682, even before Penn arrived, a survey was made of the Naaman's Creek property for John Grubb and his partners. This survey did not subdivide the property between the three partners, and later this was to cause considerable problems with William Penn. The survey was confirmed by a warrant dated April 26, 1684. Today, this area appears on the map as Grubb's Landing, although John's sons probably established the landing itself after his death. A modern street down to the river from Route 13 is named Grubb's Landing Road. Grubb's original house was rebuilt in 1783 by this great-grandson, Amer Grubb and today is the administrative building for the Holy Rosary Church in Claymont. Another street in the area named Grubb Road ran along the southern side of Naaman's Creek. The eastern half of this street from Route 13 to Arden became Harvey Road in 1887, but the portion west of Arden still retains its original name for several miles.

John's next land transaction was recorded on September 3, 1691, involving a 4-acre (0.016 km^{2}) tract purchased from Thomas Gilpin adjacent to the Naaman's Creek tract. Here John built his tannery that became the center of a substantial tanning industry that lasted in the area until the nineteenth century.

=== Family ===
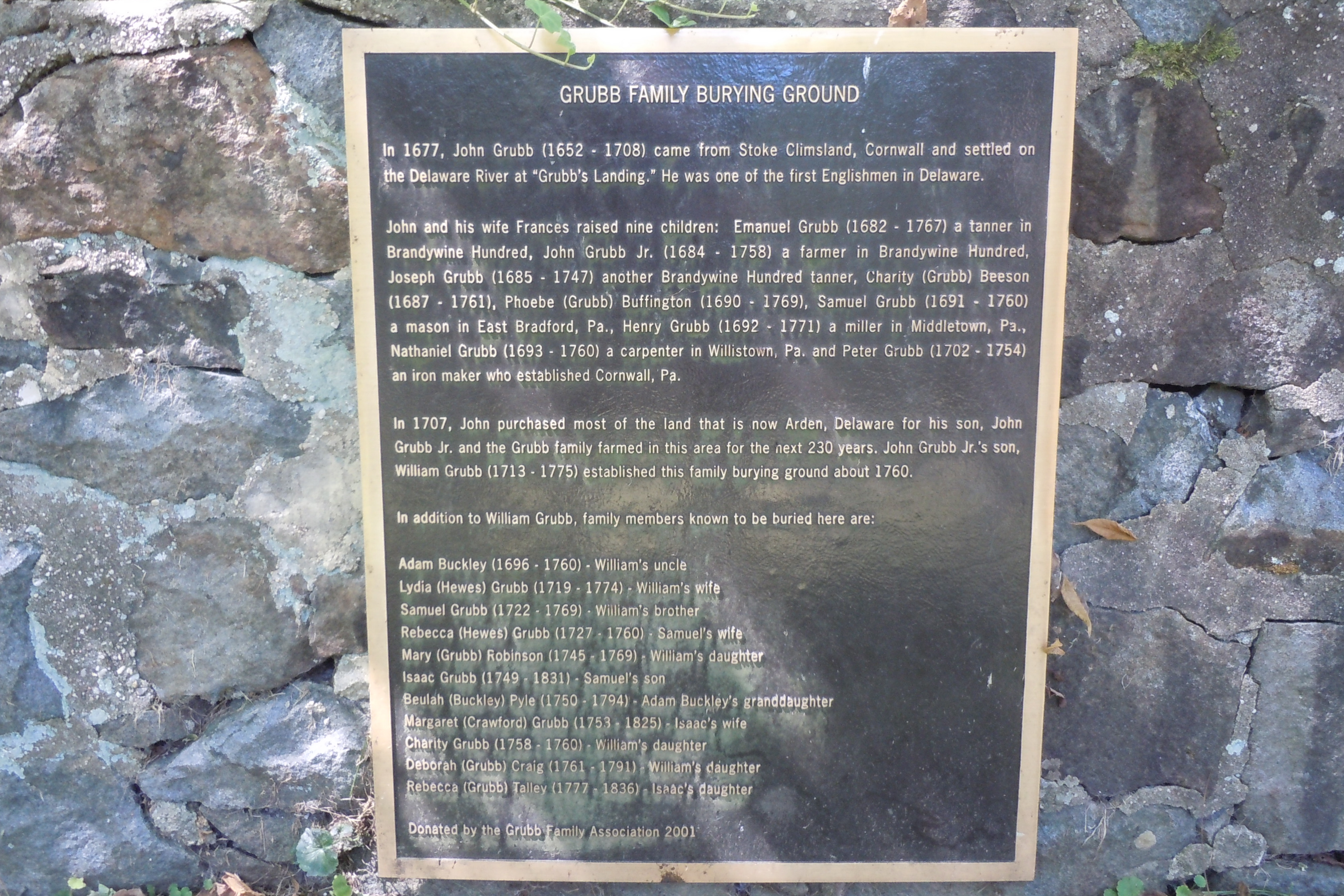
In 2002, the Grubb Family Association placed a plaque at the Grubb Burying Ground in Arden Delaware.

By the time John moved to Naaman's Creek, he was married to his wife, Frances. They had nine children: Emanuel Grubb (1682–1767), John Grubb (1684–1758), Joseph Grubb (c1684 - 1747), Charity Beeson (1687–1761), Phebe Buffington (c1690 - 1769), Samuel Grubb (c1691 - 1760), Henry Grubb (c1692 - 1770), Nathaniel Grubb (c1693 - 1760) and Peter Grubb (1702–1754). Emanuel Grubb's obituary in Penn's Gazette eighty-six years later reported that his parents lived in a cave along the banks of the Delaware River until John finished their house, and that Emanuel was born in this cave. The story also claims that Emanuel was the first child of English parents born in Delaware. However, Gilbert Cope indicates that at least six children of English parents were born in the area before Emanuel. The story about the cave seems improbable because John already lived on the Naaman's Creek tract for a year or so by the time Emanuel was born.

It is sometimes held that John Grubb's wife was Frances Vane, daughter of Sir Henry Vane, the second governor of Massachusetts. That belief, promulgated by Judge Ignatius Grubb in 1893, has endured and continues today. However, Henry Vane's daughter Frances was buried in Kent County, England, on June 4, 1683. After extensive research of the issue, the Grubb Family concluded that there is no primary evidence that Frances Grubb was Sir Henry Vane's daughter.

=== Political career ===
John began his political career in 1692 when he was elected to a one-year term in the Pennsylvania Provincial Assembly from New Castle County including Brandywine Hundred. The major issue that year was a dispute between the three lower counties (that ultimately became Delaware) and the rest of Pennsylvania over the need for military defenses. The Nine Years' War with the French had started three years earlier. The lower counties, where Quakers were a minority, strongly supported defense construction. They were opposed by the upper counties that were solidly Quaker and did not feel exposed to a potential threat from the French fleet. A tax to construct defenses was proposed, but rejected by the Assembly. The next year, John did not return to the Assembly and was appointed a Justice of the Peace. He was also responsible for tax collection and his own property was assessed at 200 pounds: an amount which one source termed, moderately substantial. In 1698, John was elected to the Assembly for his second term.

=== Dispute with William Penn ===
From the beginning of the colony, Penn planned several 10,000-acre (40 km^{2}) manors for his heirs. One of these manors, known as the Rocklands, was to be in Brandywine Hundred including the Naaman's Creek area. Penn purchased a 5,000-acre (20 km^{2}) tract from Judge William Stockdale of New Castle, and traded land in West Jersey for Isaac Savoy and David Bilderbeck's portion of the tract they owned jointly with John Grubb. John refused Penn's similar offer to relocate. Further, John took the position that because he already lived on the land, that he should have first choice of which 200-acre (0.81 km^{2}) portion he would receive in the subdivision. This would have resulted in an irregular property line that was unacceptable to Penn. As a result, the two never agreed on the line. In 1691 and 1692, Penn's agents complained that Grubb was making "daily Havock and Spoyle" of the timber on that portion of the tract claimed by Penn.

In 1699, Penn returned to Pennsylvania after a fifteen-year absence. Upon his arrival, Penn ordered his young Secretary, James Logan to complete the establishment of the manors and resolve the property line dispute with John Grubb. However, the matter was not settled and the dispute carried over into politics. In January 1700, Penn called a special session of the Assembly to deal with the piracy question. The sheriff of New Castle failed to collect the votes from the upper Brandywine Hundred area. John Grubb along with Cornelius Empson, who was to have his own problems with Logan, led a petition drive to overturn the election results. On January 25, the Assembly met and decided that the sheriff should be rebuked, but that the session would start without holding a new election because the session was limited to just the question of enacting stronger piracy laws. That October, John won a seat in the regular Assembly election. However, the voters in the southern part of New Castle County complained that they had not been notified, and the Assembly ordered a new election. This time John was defeated. At Penn's request, the Assembly recodified the colony's laws but failed to address the defense issue. The upper and lower counties remained as divided as ever on the need for defenses. Delaware appealed directly to the crown and was granted its own independent legislature in 1704. Penn himself returned to England in 1701 and would never again visit his colony.

Logan remained in Pennsylvania as Penn's agent. In a letter dated February 26, 1702, Logan instructed Isaac Taylor to resurvey Stockdale's plantation and divide Penn's portion of the Naaman's Creek tract from the land owned by "that troublesome man John Grubb". However, John objected to the resulting line and cut down the marked trees. Logan's letters of 1712 indicate that John's children still held the property, and that the dispute remained unresolved. Ultimately, the Grubb family not only retained the Naaman's Creek tract, but also acquired substantial portions of the former Stockdale property."

=== Later life ===
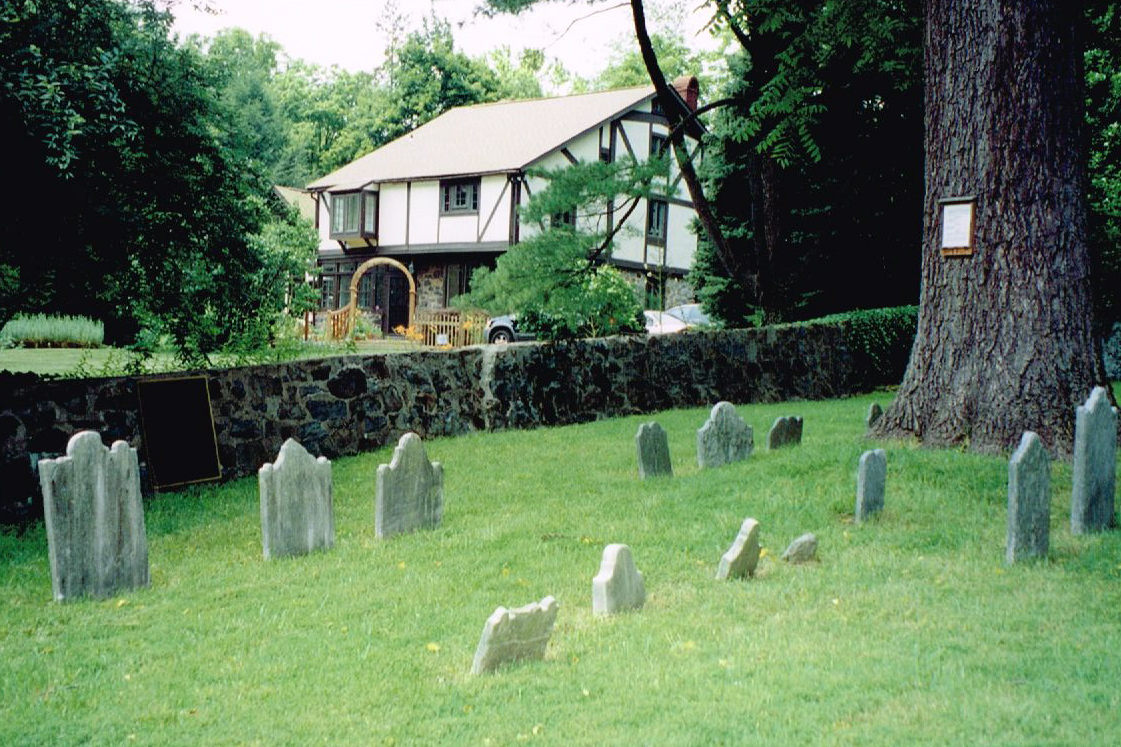
John's grandson, William Grubb (1713 - 1775) established the Grubb Burying Ground next to his home (seen in the background) in modern Arden, Delaware. John Grubb is buried at St. Martin's church in Marcus Hook.

By the early 1700s, John's oldest son, Emanuel became responsible for the tannery. One of Logan's letters indicates that John suffered a serious illness during this period. On December 29, 1703/4, John purchased eleven lots together with four and a half acres of woodland in Marcus Hook, which is just on the Pennsylvania side of the modern border and is only a few miles north of Naaman's Creek. John and Frances, along with their younger children, then moved out of the Naaman's Creek homestead. John's house in Marcus Hook survived until 1989. On February 26, 1705/6, John purchased two additional lots with dwellings at Marcus Hook, adjacent to his existing property. A year later, he also purchased a 175-acre (0.71 km^{2}) Brandywine Hundred tract in modern Arden, Delaware, several miles inland from the river. His second son, John came of age and settled as a farmer on this new tract that became known as "Grubb Corner". The Grubb family burying ground is located on this tract.

After his death at age 56 in March 1708, John was buried at the St. Martin's Episcopal Church cemetery in Marcus Hook. The original St. Martins was built in 1700, although the current structure dates to 1845. The deed stipulates that no Quaker be buried there. While this may have been relaxed later, it is unlikely that John Grubb would have been interred at St. Martin's in 1708 had he been a Quaker at that time. John's widow, Frances remarried to Richard Buffington, John's old friend. They lived on the Brandywine Creek tract in East Bradford, Pennsylvania. The date of her death is not recorded but was before 1721 when Buffington remarried again.

John Grubb's major asset at the time of his death was 500 acres, an amount typical of early Delaware settlers even though the average farm of the period only used eighty acres. Land was becoming more expensive and was selling for two pounds per acre improved and six shillings per acre unimproved. While Non-Quakers left a double share of their land to the oldest son, John followed the Quaker pattern and gave equal shares of his land to each of his seven sons. It was not possible to divide his land because of the ongoing dispute with Penn. The formal division did not occur until 1761, by which time only two of his sons remained alive. There was an understanding among his sons concerning the use of this land and a more formal division only became necessary to establish the rights of the next generation. John's other assets were substantially higher than average because he was both a farmer and was engaged in the tanning trade. These assets were valued at 566 pounds, including debts of 303 pounds owed to him. John left a cow and one-third of his personal estate to Frances and various amounts to his daughters.

== Notable descendants ==
- Nathaniel Grubb (c.1693 – 1760) represented Chester County in the Pennsylvania Provincial Assembly from 1749 to 1758.
- Peter Grubb (c.1702 – 1754), the founder of the Grubb Family Iron Dynasty, discovered Cornwall Iron Mines and built Cornwall Iron Furnace, one of the largest ironworks in Colonial Pennsylvania, now a designated National Historic Landmark.
- Curtis Grubb (c.1730 – 1789) was two-thirds owner of the Cornwall Iron Furnace and colonel of the 2nd Lancaster Battalion during the American Revolution.
- Peter Grubb, Jr. (1740 – 1786) was one-third owner of the Cornwall Iron Furnace and colonel of the 8th Lancaster Battalion during the American Revolution.
- William Grubb Jr (1740 – c.1810) was an early settler in Charles Town, West Virginia, who during the Revolution supplied over 100 barrels of whisky per month to his neighbor, George Washington.
- Henry Bates Grubb (1774 – 1823) founded the Grubb family's Mount Hope iron empire, which became one of the largest Pennsylvania iron producers in the mid-19th century.
- Jehu Grubb (c.1781 – 1854) was an early settler and Justice of the Peace in Stark County, Ohio, a War of 1812 veteran who served in the Ohio House of Representatives in 1828 and 1832.
- Thomas Grubb McCullough (1785 – 1848) represented Franklin County, Pennsylvania, in the U.S. Congress from 1831 to 1835.
- Curtis Grubb Hussey (1802 – 1893) was a Pittsburgh industrialist who built the first Lake Superior copper mill and developed the process for making crucible cast steel.
- Samuel P. Heintzelman (1805 – 1880) was a Civil War General who commanded the 3rd Corps during the Peninsula Campaign.
- Charles Gilpin (1809 – 1891) was Mayor of Philadelphia from 1850 to 1853.
- Edward Burd Grubb Sr. (1810–1867) was a prominent fourth-generation member of the Grubb Family Iron Dynasty in Lancaster, Pennsylvania
- D. H. Starbuck (1818 – 1887) was a North Carolina lawyer and political figure who among his many political roles served as United States Attorney for the entire state, and then for the Western District of North Carolina after the state was divided into two districts.
- John G. Parke (1827 – 1900) was a Civil War general and later superintendent of West Point.
- Edward Burd Grubb, Jr. (1841–1913) was a Civil War lllGeneral, a candidate for governor, and later ambassador to Spain. After the war he joined the Grubb Family Iron Dynasty as president of the Lebanon Valley Furnace Company.
- Ignatius Cooper Grubb (1841 – 1927) was a political activist who became a justice of the Delaware Supreme Court.
- William Irwin Grubb (1862 – 1935) was a federal district judge in Birmingham, Alabama, who was appointed by President Hoover to the Wickersham Commission.
- George Grey Barnard (1863 – 1938) was a noted sculptor who founded the Cloisters collection that is now a part of the New York Metropolitan Museum of Art.
- J. Hunter Grubb (1870 – 1930) was president of the DuPont Chemical Corporation.
- Stuart Heintzelman (1876 – 1935) was a career Army officer who was promoted to major general in 1931.
- Roland Grubb Kent (1877 – 1952) was a noted classics professor at the University of Pennsylvania.
- J. Grubb Alexander (1887 – 1932) was a prolific screenwriter who wrote over ninety films during the silent screen era.
- Edward Burd Grubb III (1893 – 1973) was president of the New York Curb Exchange during the critical period after the creation of the SEC.
- Warner Norton Grubb (1900 – 1947) was a navy commodore during W.W.II.
- Margaret Louise Grubb (1907 – 1963) was the first wife of L. Ron Hubbard, the founder of Scientology.
- Stanley Keller Grubb (1907 – 1990), better known as Stan Keller, was a well-known musician and big-band leader in the 1940s.
- Curtis Grubb Culin (1915 – 1963) was awarded the Legion of Merit for inventing the "Rhino Tank" used at Normandy during W.W. II.
- Warner Norton Grubb III (1948 – 2015) was an author on education economics and the David Garner Chair of higher education at Berkeley.
- Floyd Dale Grubb (born 1949) was the Democratic Caucus Leader in the Indiana State Assembly.
