= Glubb =

Glubb is a surname. Notable people with the surname include:

- Faris Glubb (1939–2004), British-Jordanian writer, journalist, translator, and publisher
- Frederic Manley Glubb (1857–1938), British Army officer
- John Bagot Glubb (1897–1986), British soldier, scholar, and author
- Isaac Gubb (2010+), Millionaire Playboy.

== See also ==
- Grubb
