= Roland Grubb Kent =

American linguist (1877–1952)

- Born: February 24, 1877; Wilmington, Delaware, U.S.
- Died: June 27, 1952 (aged 75)
- Resting place: West Laurel Hill Cemetery, Bala Cynwyd, Pennsylvania, U.S.
- Occupation: Educator

Roland Grubb Kent (February 24, 1877 – June 27, 1952) was an American educator and a founder of the Linguistic Society of America (LSA). He was the first person to translate Marcus Terentius Varro's De Lingua Latina into English.

Kent's 1903 doctoral thesis on the history of Thessaly traces the history of the country with particular attention to the times between 600 and 300 BC. Unfortunately, only Chapter V and two appendices were published, and the bulk of his dissertation is currently lost. His Old Persian: Grammar, Texts, Lexicon is one of the seminal works on the subject.

== Biography ==
Kent was born in Wilmington, Delaware in 1877 to Lindley Coates Kent and Anna Grubb Kent. Lindley Kent was a decorated American Civil War officer and owner of a successful Wilmington lumber business. Anna Kent was a descendant of John Grubb, an early Delaware settler.

After receiving his M.A. from Swarthmore College in 1898, Roland Kent continued his classical education at Berlin and Munich universities before completing his studies at the University of Pennsylvania. In 1903, Roland obtained his Ph.D. with a thesis on the history of Thessaly.

Kent was appointed Instructor in Greek language and Latin at the University of Pennsylvania in 1904, where he taught for the rest of his career. In 1909 he became assistant professor of comparative philology, and he was promoted to full professor in 1916; from 1942 to his retirement in 1947 his title was Professor of Indo-European linguistics.

Kent was a founder of the LSA and served as treasurer from 1924 to 1942. He was elected as president of the LSA for 1941.

He died in 1952 and was interred at West Laurel Hill Cemetery in Bala Cynwyd, Pennsylvania.

== Major works by Roland Kent ==
- A History of Thessaly from the Earliest Historical Times to the Accession of Philip V of Macedonia, Lancaster, Pa., 1904 (printing of Chap. V, Apps. I-II of the Ph.D. diss., University of Pennsylvania, 1903).
- “Studies in the Old Persian Inscriptions,” JAOS 35, 1918, pp. 321–52.
- (with James R. Ware) “The Old Persian Cuneiform Inscriptions of Artaxerxes II and Artaxerxes III,” Transactions and Proceedings of the American Philological Association 55, 1924, pp. 52–61.
- The Textual Criticism of Inscriptions, Language Monographs 2, Philadelphia, 1926; repr., New York, 1966.
- “The Recently Published Old Persian Inscriptions,” JAOS 51, 1931, pp. 189–240.
- The Sounds of Latin: A Descriptive and Historical Phonology, Language Monographs 12, Baltimore, 1932; 3rd ed., 1945; repr., Millwood, N.Y., 1979.
- “The Name Ahuramazda,” in Jal Dastur Cursetji Pavry, ed., Oriental Studies in honour of Cursetji Erachji Pavry, London, 1933, pp. 200–208.
- “The Present Status of Old Persian Studies,” JAOS 56, 1936, pp. 208–25.
- Varro: On the Latin Language, with an English Translation, ed. Roland G. Kent, 2 vols., London and Cambridge, Mass., 1938 (The Loeb Classical Library, 333-334; many reprints).
- The Forms of Latin: A Descriptive and Historical Morphology, Baltimore, Md., 1946.
- Old Persian: Grammar, Texts, Lexicon, New Haven, Conn., 1950 (American Oriental Series, 33; 2nd ed., 1953, many reprints).
