= Tim Yocum =

American politician

Member of the Indiana House of Representatives from the 42nd district
- Incumbent
- Assumed office January 16, 2025
- Preceded by: Alan Morrison

Personal details
- Party: Republican

Tim Yocum is an American politician. He serves as a Republican member for the 42nd district of the Indiana House of Representatives.

== Career ==
Yocum served at Vermillion County Commissioner from 2015 to 2025.

=== Scandals ===
In June 2025, Newley Appointed Indiana State Representative Tim Yocum (R-Clinton) was formally cited by the Vermillion Circuit Court for improper ex parte communication after he emailed Judge Chris Wrede regarding a pending small-claims case involving Wabash Valley Construction. The court entered the email into the case file without reviewing it substantively, noting it had not been served on the opposing party or filed through proper channels.

At a June 24 hearing, Yocum reiterated allegations that Judge Wrede had previously made disparaging remarks about him and requested recusal or reassignment. The court denied the request as untimely under Indiana Small Claims Rule 12.1 and found no basis for recusal, citing precedent presuming judicial impartiality.

The underlying dispute concerned a bathroom remodeling project at Yocum's residence. The court determined the work was completed as agreed and that the contractor's invoice was reasonable. On July 1, 2025, the court ruled in favor of Wabash Valley Construction and ordered Yocum to pay the outstanding balance, late fees, and court costs. Yocum did not publicly comment on the ruling.
