= William Savery (cabinetmaker) =

American cabinetmaker (1721/22–1787)

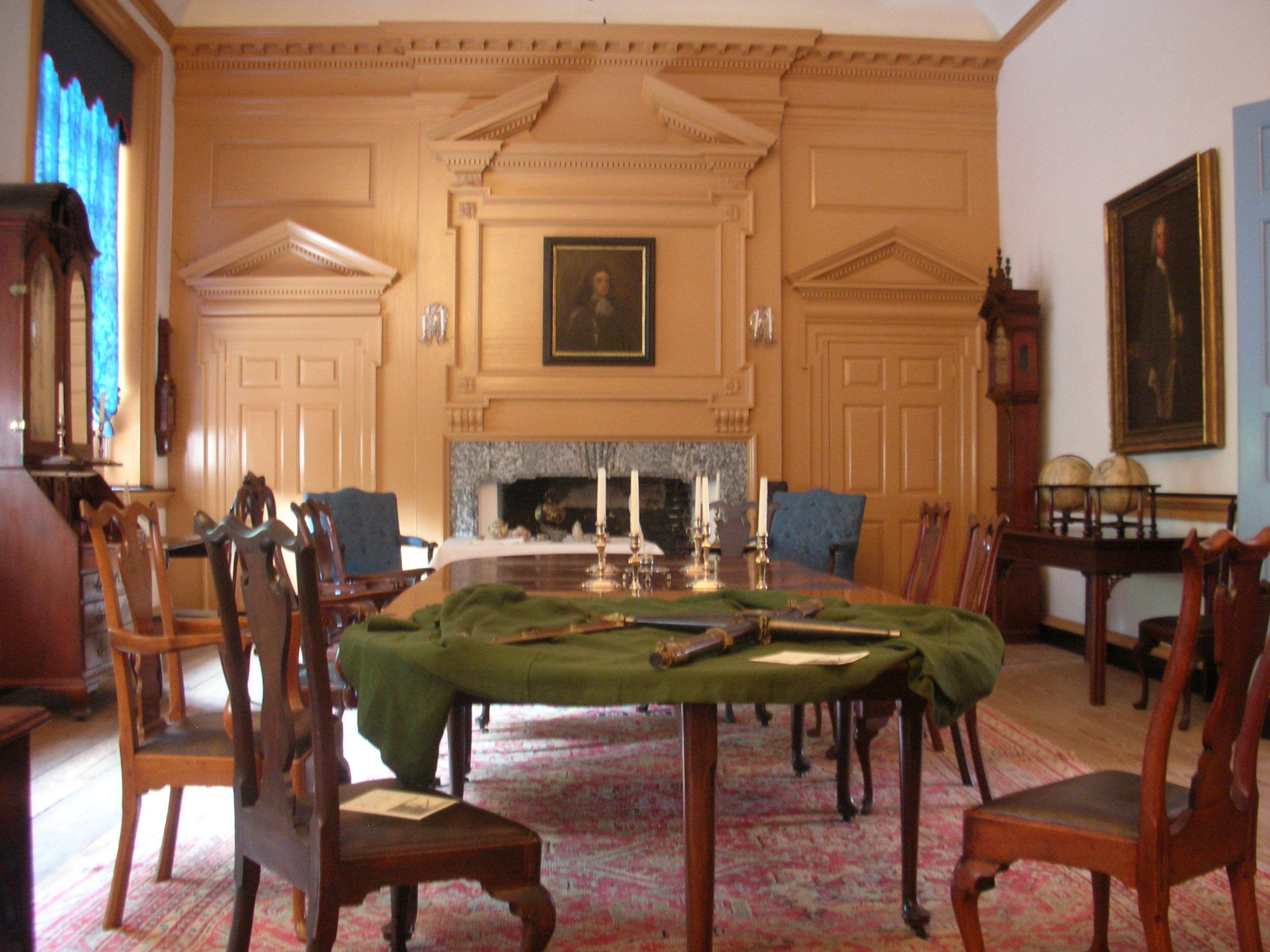
Governor's Council Chamber, Independence Hall, Philadelphia, Pennsylvania. Four of these Queen Anne chairs are originals and attributed to Savery; four are modern reproductions.

William Savery (1721 or 1722 – 1787 in Philadelphia, Pennsylvania) was an 18th-century American cabinetmaker noted for his furniture in the Queen Anne and Philadelphia Chippendale styles.

== Life and career ==
Savery served a 7-year apprenticeship under the Philadelphia cabinetmaker Solomon Fussell, beginning in 1735. In 1742, at about age 21, he opened his own shop on Second Street, just south of High (now Market) Street in Philadelphia. Benjamin Franklin was an early patron (and a patron of Fussell), and two Savery-attributed pieces descended in Franklin's family. In 1754 Savery was appointed a ward tax assessor, serving under Franklin.

In addition to custom pieces in mahogany and walnut, Savery manufactured large numbers of maple rush-seated chairs. Some of his pieces are marked with an "S." A rare few retain their original paper labels:

"All Sorts of Chairs and Joiners Work Made and Sold by WILLIAM SAVERY, At the Sign of the Chair, a little below the Market, in Second Street. PHILADELPHIA."

On April 19, 1746 he married Mary Peters in Philadelphia. Their son, William Jr., became a notable Quaker preacher and abolitionist. Their other son, Thomas, continued in the furniture trade.

== Rediscovery ==
Early in the 20th century, the walnut dressing table at Van Cortlandt House Museum in The Bronx became the first labeled Savery piece rediscovered by scholars. This led them to attribute many unmarked Philadelphia pieces to Savery (see Halsey and Dyer, below). Subsequent scholarship has cast doubt on many of these early attributions.

== Examples of his work ==
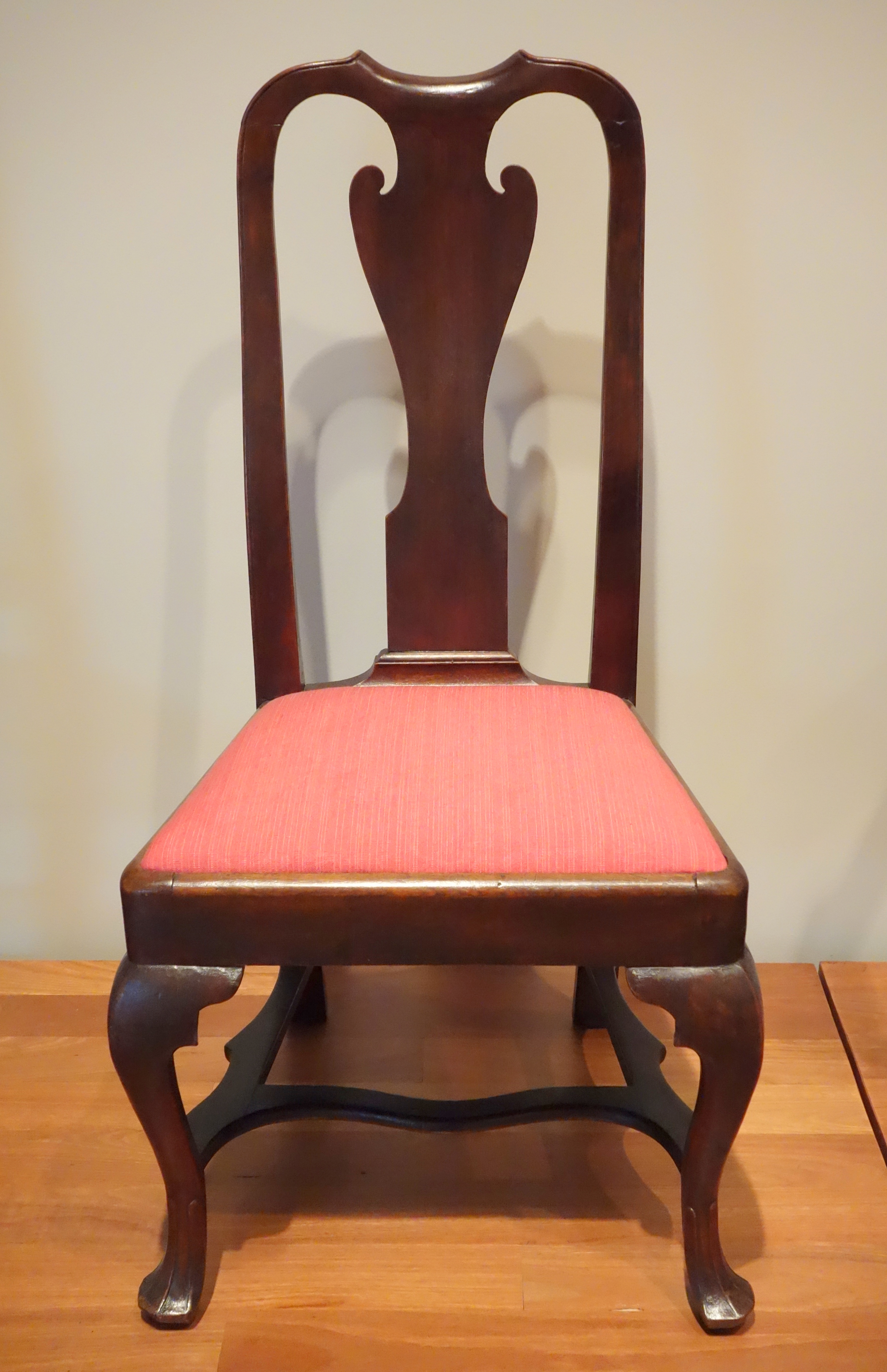
Side chair by William Savery, c. 1740-1750

- Side chair (ca. 1742-55, walnut, with Savery label), Colonial Williamsburg, Williamsburg, Virginia.
- Four Queen Anne chairs (ca. 1742-60, walnut), Governor's Council Chamber, Independence Hall, Independence National Historical Park, Philadelphia, Pennsylvania. Originally a set of eight, four reproduction chairs were added in 1971.
- Tea table (ca. 1742-70, mahogany), Philadelphia Museum of Art.
- Side chair with rush seat (ca. 1745, maple, with Savery label), Metropolitan Museum of Art.
- Dressing table (ca. 1745-55, maple, owned by Franklin descendants), private collection.
- Four-sided music stand (ca, 1750–70, walnut, owned by Franklin descendants), Philadelphia History Museum, on loan to Franklin Court.
- Dressing table (walnut, with Savery label, altered), Van Cortlandt House Museum, Van Cortlandt Park, Bronx, New York City. The carved shell on its drawer is not original to the table.
