= Alan Morrison (politician) =

American politician from Indiana

Director of the Indiana Department of Natural Resources
- Incumbent
- Assumed office January 17, 2025
- Governor: Mike Braun
- Preceded by: Dan Bortner

Member of the Indiana House of Representatives from the 42nd district
- In office November 7, 2012 – January 13, 2025
- Preceded by: Dale Grubb
- Succeeded by: Tim Yocum

Personal details
- Party: Republican
- Education: Slippery Rock University (BS); Indiana State University (MS)

Alan Morrison is an American politician and public official from the state of Indiana. He is the current Director of the Indiana Department of Natural Resources (DNR), appointed by Governor Mike Braun. A member of the Republican Party, Morrison previously served as a member of the Indiana House of Representatives from 2012 to 2025, representing the 42nd district, which includes parts of Vigo, Clay, Fountain, Parke, Vermillion, and Warren counties.

== Early life and education ==
Morrison earned a Bachelor of Science degree in social science from Slippery Rock University and a Master of Science degree in sports management from Indiana State University. Before entering politics, he worked in the private sector and in athletics administration.

== Political career ==
=== Indiana House of Representatives ===
Morrison was elected to the Indiana House of Representatives in 2012, succeeding longtime Democratic representative Dale Grubb. He was re-elected multiple times and served until 2025. During his tenure, Morrison supported legislation related to economic development, gaming regulation, aviation, natural resources, and personal liberty. He received recognition from Aviation Indiana as State Representative of the Year in 2022 for his legislative support of regional airports.

He authored or supported bills including:

- a measure to prevent employers from requiring workers to be microchipped,
- a proposal to decriminalize the herbal supplement kratom,
- and legislation altering compensation payments related to the Terre Haute casino project.

=== Director of the Indiana Department of Natural Resources ===
Morrison resigned from the Indiana House in early 2025 after being appointed by Governor Braun to serve as Director of the Department of Natural Resources. He was succeeded in the House by Republican Tim Yocum. As head of DNR, Morrison has expressed interest in modernizing the department's regulatory practices and enhancing its engagement with both business stakeholders and conservation advocates.

== Personal life ==
Morrison lives in Brazil, Indiana.

== Electoral history ==
General election, Indiana House District 42 – November 5, 2024
Party	Candidate	Votes	%
Republican	Alan Morrison (incumbent)	24,611	100.0

Republican primary, Indiana House District 42 – May 7, 2024
Party	Candidate	Votes	%
Republican	Alan Morrison (incumbent)	5,702	61.1
Republican	Tim R. Yocum	3,626	38.9

General election, Indiana House District 42 – November 8, 2022
Party	Candidate	Votes	%
Republican	Alan Morrison (incumbent)	13,800	68.4
Democratic	Mark Spelbring	6,379	31.6

Republican primary, Indiana House District 42 – May 3, 2022
Party	Candidate	Votes	%
Republican	Alan Morrison (incumbent)	7,186	100.0

General election, Indiana House District 42 – November 3, 2020
Party	Candidate	Votes	%
Republican	Alan Morrison (incumbent)	18,945	66.8
Democratic	Amy Burke Adams	9,421	33.2

Republican primary, Indiana House District 42 – June 2, 2020
Party	Candidate	Votes	%
Republican	Alan Morrison (incumbent)	5,379	100.0

General election, Indiana House District 42 – November 6, 2018
Party	Candidate	Votes	%
Republican	Alan Morrison (incumbent)	13,073	60.4
Democratic	Evelyn Brown	8,570	39.6

Republican primary, Indiana House District 42 – May 8, 2018
Party	Candidate	Votes	%
Republican	Alan Morrison (incumbent)	4,703	100.0

General election, Indiana House District 42 – November 8, 2016
Party	Candidate	Votes	%
Republican	Alan Morrison (incumbent)	14,901	56.6
Democratic	Tim Skinner	11,434	43.4

General election, Indiana House District 42 – November 4, 2014
Party	Candidate	Votes	%
Republican	Alan Morrison (incumbent)	9,224	56.2
Democratic	Mark Spelbring	7,193	43.8

General election, Indiana House District 42 – November 6, 2012
Party	Candidate	Votes	%
Republican	Alan Morrison	12,788	50.2
Democratic	Mark Spelbring	12,682	49.8

Republican primary, Indiana House District 42 – May 8, 2012
Party	Candidate	Votes	%
Republican	Alan Morrison	2,419	36.4
Republican	Jim Meece	2,192	33.0
Republican	Bill Webster	2,030	30.6

General election, Indiana House District 42 – November 2, 2010
Party	Candidate	Votes	%
Democratic	Clyde Kersey (incumbent)	7,772	50.4
Republican	Alan Morrison	7,514	48.8

== See also ==
- Indiana House of Representatives
- Indiana Department of Natural Resources
- List of state government departments in Indiana
