= Rebecca Scattergood Savery =

American quilter (1770–1855)

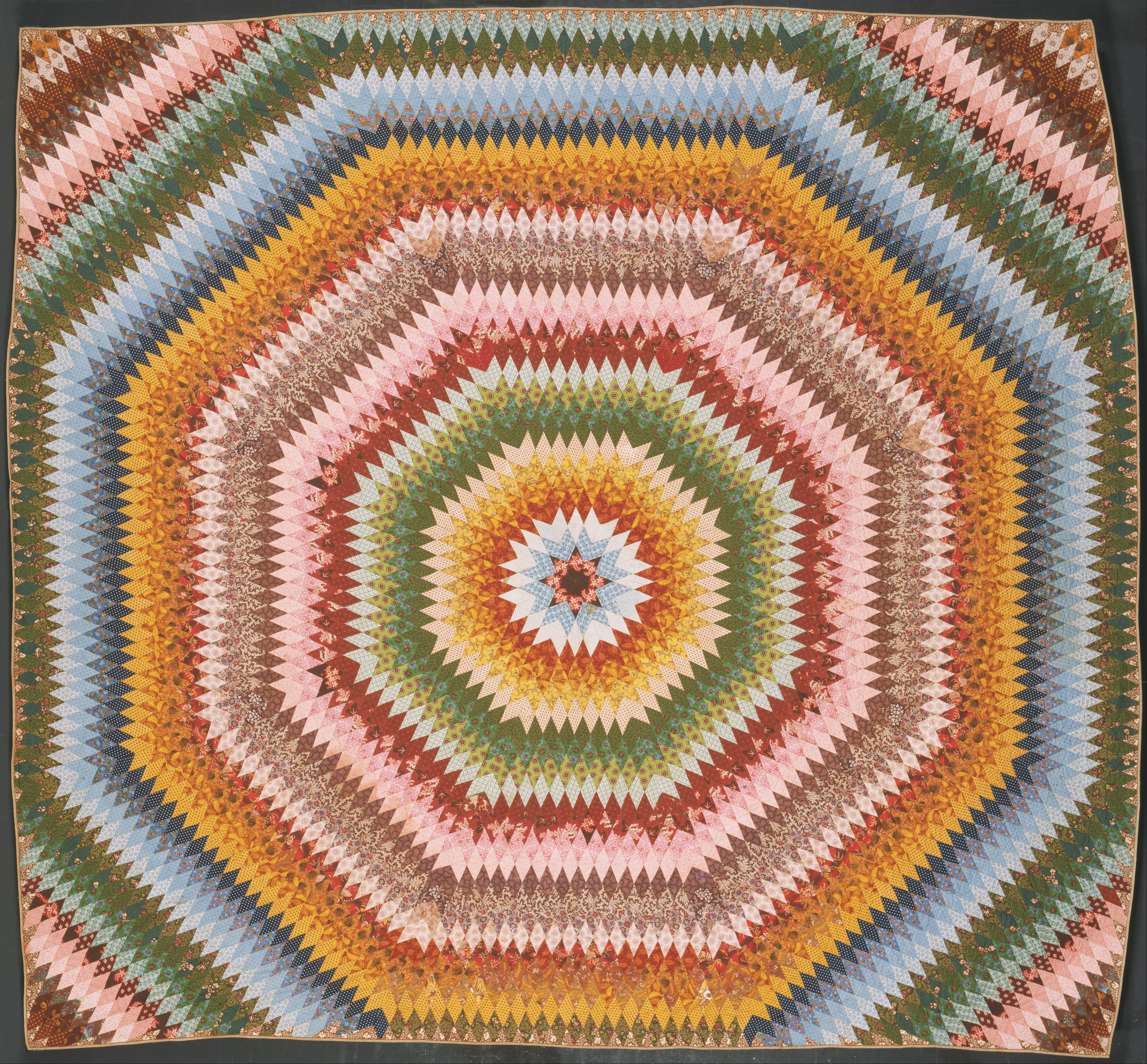
Sunburst Quilt by Rebecca Scattergood Savery, 1839, in the collection of the Philadelphia Museum of Art

Rebecca Scattergood Savery (1770–1855) was an American quilter. She is associated with six quilts produced between c. 1827 and c. 1852.

The daughter of John and Elizabeth Head Scattergood, Savery was born into a family that had lived in Philadelphia since the late seventeenth century. Her father-in-law was the chairmaker William Savery, formerly an apprentice of Solomon Fussell; her husband was the cabinetmaker Thomas Savery. Together the couple raised five children. The Saverys were active in the Philadelphia Yearly Meeting of the Society of Friends, and it is assumed that Rebecca conformed to the traditional roles and practices ascribed to Quaker women of her era. Three of the quilts ascribed to her are made in the Sunburst pattern; the other three are Friendship quilts, which were made in a group. All use English roller printed cotton fabric and wool batting, and the Friendship quilts are marked with 175 names, as well as with a series of inked drawings. All but one appear to have been created during her widowhood, when Rebecca was in her 50s and 60s.

Savery is best known for the sunburst-patterned quilt which she produced in 1839 for her granddaughter Sarah Savery, born that year; measuring nine feet by nearly ten feet and containing almost four thousand diamond-shaped pieces, each about four inches long, it is currently owned by the Philadelphia Museum of Art, in whose quilt collection it is the central piece. A similar quilt, with a similar provenance, is in the collection of the Winterthur Museum and Library, which also holds a collection of documents related to the Savery family. A third quilt in the pattern is held by the American Folk Art Museum. One of the Friendship quilts is in the collection of the International Quilt Study Center & Museum.
