= Warner Norton Grubb III =

- Born: January 9, 1948; Santiago, Chile
- Died: January 15, 2015 (aged 67); Taipei, Taiwan
- Occupation: Educator
- Writing career
- Subject: Education Economics

Warner Norton Grubb III (1948 - 2015) was an American author, educational economist, and professor. His academic focus was inequality in society, particularly institutional sources of inequality.

== Life ==
Grubb was born in Santiago, Chile while his father was on foreign assignment with the Eastern Standard Oil Company (ESSO). He was the grandson of U.S. Navy Commodore Warner Norton Grubb and a descendant of John Grubb, who came from Cornwall in 1677 and settled in Delaware. Grubb's father moved the family to Rhode Island several years before he died, when Grubb was eleven.

In 1969, after graduating from Harvard University with a major in economics, Grubb married Erica Black, known as Rikki. The couple became elementary school teachers in Baltimore, Maryland for a year before returning to Harvard, where Norton completed his course work for his doctorate and Rikki graduated from the law school. They relocated to San Francisco when Norton accepted a position as a researcher at the University of California, Berkeley and Rikki joined the Equal Employment Opportunity Commission (EEOC) as an attorney.

In 1978, Grubb accepted a position as an assistant professor at the Lyndon B. Johnson School of Public Affairs at the University of Texas. In 1985 he returned to Berkeley as an associate professor; in 1987 he was appointed as a full professor. He remained at Berkeley for 26 years as the David Pierpont Gardner Professor until his retirement in 2013.

== Academic work ==
Throughout his career, Grubb investigated inequality, especially the institutional sources of inequality, and was an advocate for solutions toward an equitable and democratic education system. He explored the role of education in labor markets and proposed ways to improve the effectiveness of high schools and community colleges.

His earliest work focused on school finance and later on other resources. Grubb contended that while sufficient budgets were necessary, money by itself is not enough. He called this the money myth. Other resources including instructional approaches and school climate were equally important in determining educational outcomes. Putting his theories into practice, in 2000 Norton started the Principal Leadership Institute at Berkeley to train principals to lead urban schools.

Grubb's work focused on the institutional practices that caused inequities in schools and colleges that apply to all individuals, not just minorities. Grubb also examined the relationship between education and employment. He pointed out that when schools excessively follow patterns in the labor market, they tend to reinforce the inequities of society against minorities and women. He advocated the multiple pathways approach to balance vocational and academic education. Grubb also focused on community colleges because they are often the entry point for minority students.

== Bibliography ==
Grubb's published works include:

- Broken Promises, How Americans fail their children (1975)
- Education through Occupations in American High Schools (1995)
- Learning to Work: The case for re-integrating job training and education (1996)
- Working in the Middle: Strengthening education and training for a mid-skilled labor force (1996)
- Honored but Invisible: An inside look at teaching in community colleges (1999)
- The Education Gospel: The economic power of schooling (2007)
- The Money Myth: School resources, outcomes and equity (2009)
- Leadership Challenges in High Schools: Multiple pathways to success (2010)
- Basic Skills in Education in Community Colleges: Inside and outside of classrooms (2012)
