= William Grubb Farm =

Historic house in West Virginia, United States

- U.S. National Register of Historic Places
- U.S. Historic district
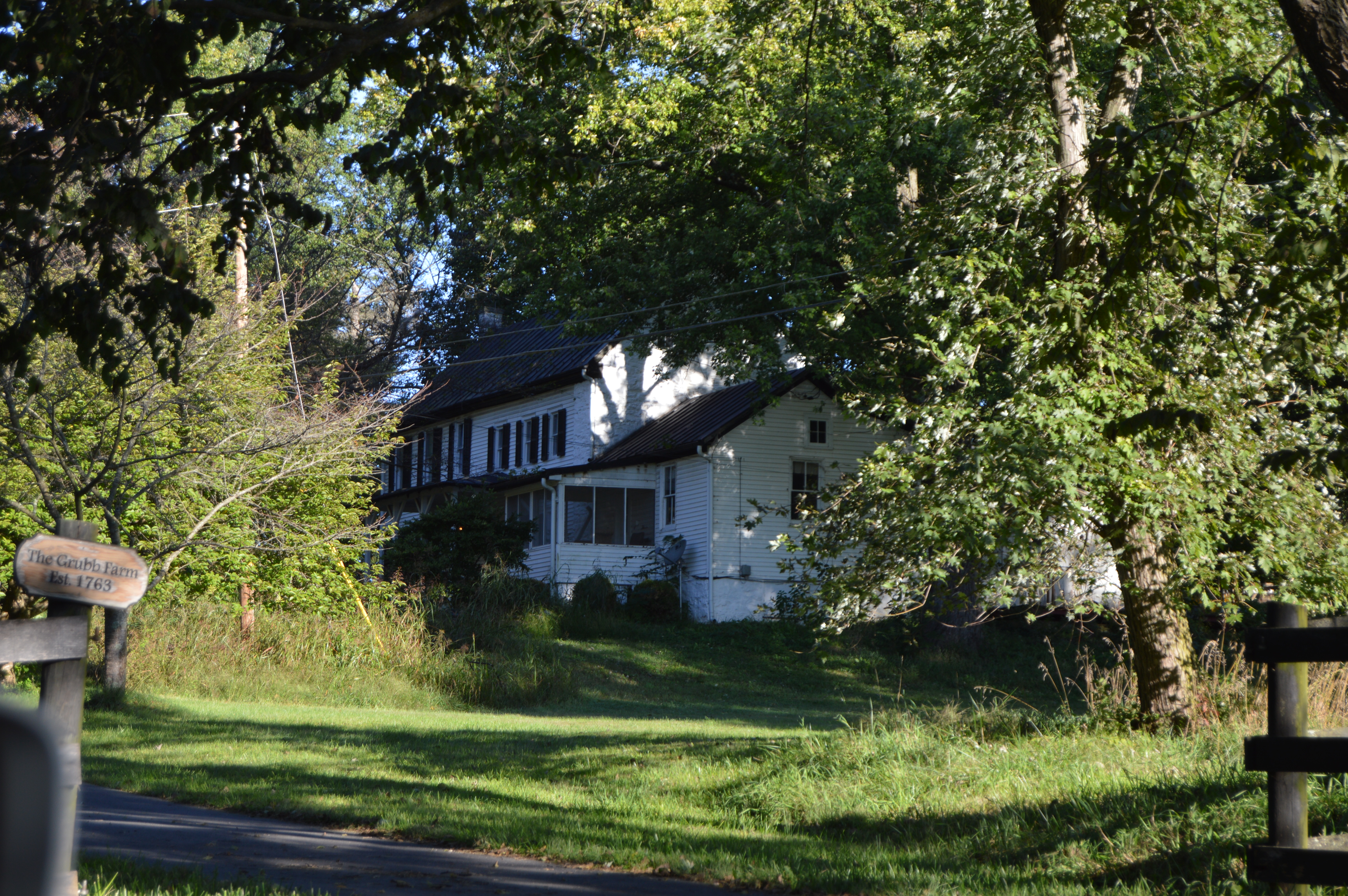
- Driveway view

- Location within West Virginia Location within the United States
- Location: Jefferson County, West Virginia, USA
- Coordinates: 39°14′20″N 77°54′14″W
- Architectural style: Georgian
- NRHP reference No.: 91001735
- Added to NRHP: November 21, 1991

The William Grubb Farm, also known as Conway and Brook Manor, is located near Charles Town, West Virginia. Built c. 1763 by William Grubb Jr., the house is a "stone-ender," with stone masonry at the gable ends of the house and log construction on the long sides, now covered with clapboards. The complex includes the house, a well course (1920), a corn crib (c. 1850), a barn (c. 1850), and a Quaker burial ground (c. 1759 and onwards).

== History ==
In October 1734, Emanuel Grubb and John Grubb, Jr., the two oldest sons of John Grubb of Brandywine Hundred, Delaware, had 730 acres (3.0 km^{2}) surveyed along the Bullskin Creek near Charles Town. While it is unlikely that either Emanuel or John, Jr. ever traveled to the area, the next year, Emanuel's son John and John Grubb, Jr.'s son, William posted a 100-pound bond to secure the title, listed as Tract 76, Map 3. William returned to Delaware, and Emanuel's sons John, James, Frances, Benjamin and Emanuel Jr. settled in the area where they shipped hides back to the family's tannery in Delaware. In 1742, the family purchased two additional tracts, yielding 520 acres (2.1 km^{2}) and nine years later purchased a further 400 acres (1.6 km^{2}).

At the time, this was a tough frontier region and Benjamin Grubb became one of its colorful figures. He and his associate David Morgan were once hauled before the magistrate after they took on all comers in a bar room brawl. However, by 1864 Benjamin was the last member of Emanuel Grubb's family in the area when he sold the remainder of Emanuel's interest and relocated to North Carolina.

When John Grubb, Jr. died in 1758, his interest in the Bullskin Creek property was inherited by his son Adam, a Pennsylvania shipwright who had no use for the tract. He leased the property to his older brother William Grubb (1713–1775), a Delaware farmer who had traveled to the Bullskin area in the mid-1730s to represent his father when the land was first acquired. William was a leader in the Chichester, Pennsylvania Quaker Meeting and the church was interested in establishing a settlement in the Charles Town area. On September 1, 1762, William and his brother, Samuel (another Delaware Quaker farmer) received an additional 431 acres (1.74 km^{2}) from Lord Fairfax.

With the war now over, it became reasonably safe to settle in the region, and William's son, William Grubb, Jr. (1740 - c. 1810) relocated to the area from Delaware with his new bride, Susanna (probably Kerlin). William and Susannah ultimately inherited all of the family's Bullskin lands where they raised eight children. During the Revolution, William supplied over 100 barrels of whisky per month to his neighbor, George Washington. By 1800 a mill had been built, which operated until 1935. The Bullskin Run Quaker Meeting House was also on the property, but does not survive. When William, Jr. died, the property was inherited by William Grubb III (c. 1779 - c. 1858) who moved to Ohio in 1814 and sold the property to his sister Rebecca and her husband, John Haines. The house was expanded in 1880 by Warren Eby.
