= William Savery =

American Quaker & preacher (1750–1804)

- Born: July 14, 1750; Philadelphia
- Died: June 19, 1804 (aged 53); Philadelphia
- Occupations: Tanner, Currier
- Known for: Traveling Quaker minister, Abolitionist, Defender of Native Americans

William Savery (July 14, 1750 - June 19, 1804) was an American Quaker, an active preacher, an abolitionist and a defender of the rights of Native Americans.

In 1798, during his traveling ministry to Europe, he preached at a Quaker meeting for worship in Norwich, England, which was attended by Elizabeth Fry and he became one of the three people who inspired her to follow a deeper Quakerism working for the poor, the sick, and for radical prison reform.

== Early life ==
William Savery Jr. was the son of Philadelphia cabinetmaker William Savery and his wife Mary Peters, both devout Quakers. He received a Quaker education, and was apprenticed as a tanner. Following the completion of his apprenticeship his faith lapsed. Then, in 1778, following a meeting for burial at the Merion Friends Meeting House, Merion, Pennsylvania, he experienced a deep religious transformation that changed his life. He married a religious fellow-Quaker, Sarah Evans, that year and in 1781 he was acknowledged as a minister.

In 1783, he was a signatory to the Quaker Anti-Slavery Petition.

== Intercession for Native Americans ==
Since the founding of Pennsylvania by the followers of William Penn, the Native American peoples perceived that they were treated by Quakers universally, without violence and with equality, justice and respect. Consequently, in the negotiation of treaties with the US government, Native American tribes often asked for the equitable presence of Quakers, both as advisers and mediators.

Savery took part in two important missions of this nature. The setting for his involvement was that in December, 1792, the Quaker meetings in Philadelphia had addressed an urgent letter to President Washington asking him to take prompt and just measures to terminate the American Indian Wars.

In 1793, six Quakers; William Savery, Joseph Moore, John Parrish, John Elliott, Jacob Lindley and William Hartshorne attended the negotiations on territory rights held between the Native leaders of the Western Confederacy and US government commissioners at Sandusky, Ohio. A major obstacle was soon presented at these negotiations by the Native Americans' demand that American settlers should relinquish all their settlements west of the Ohio River. This demand created an impasse, no treaty was concluded, and the Quaker 'peace riders' were obliged to return home via the Niagara and St. Lawrence Rivers and New York City. Savery arrived back in Philadelphia in weak health from a prolonged journey of extreme personal hardship.

In 1794, again at the request of Native Americans, a Quaker delegation was sent to New York State to assist them in the land negotiations held between the Six Nation Indians and Colonel Timothy Pickering, US commissioner. Savery volunteered for this service and witnessed the assurances and explanations given by Pickering which led to the Treaty of Canandaigua which was signed at Canandaigua, New York, on November 11, 1794. Once more, Savery found this experience to be a physically draining one which he overcame through religious zeal.

== Ministry in Europe ==
On May 18, 1796, Savery traveled to Europe with a small party of Quaker ministers; Samuel Emlen, Deborah Darby, Rebecca Young, Sarah Talbot, and Phoebe Speakman. They reached Liverpool on June 19, 1796, and he immediately held meetings there, in Manchester and in London.

Savery and his party then traveled to Germany, to visit Bad Pyrmont which was then, and still is, the center of German Quakerism. On their return to England on May 16, 1797, Savery preached throughout the British Isles. At Bath, he met the English religious writer and philanthropist, Hannah More, and was introduced by her to the preeminent abolitionist of the time, William Wilberforce.

Savery's greatest influence in his ministry abroad was when he visited Norwich where he met the Gurneys, a prominent Quaker family and Elizabeth Gurney, later Elizabeth Fry. He influenced her to a deeper Quaker witness by his ministry at the Norwich Meeting House on February 4, 1798, and in personal meetings with her. Fry would later credit Savery, Deborah Darby and Priscilla Gurney with influencing her decision.

Before leaving Britain, Savery visited Ireland and stayed at Anner Mills, Clonmel, the home of the Irish Quaker businesswoman and social benefactor, Sarah Pim Grubb. Savery was greatly troubled by the widespread poverty he saw in Ireland and on June 27, 1799, back in London, he reported to William Wilberforce on the destitute state of the people there.

On August 1, 1799, Savery and his companions concluded their ministry in Europe and sailed from Liverpool for New York.

== Later years ==
Savery arrived at New York on October 18, 1799, and on his return his health began to gradually fail. He traveled only to attend the yearly meeting of New York in 1800 and Baltimore Yearly Meeting in 1801 and from March 1804, he was confined to his home suffering from dropsy.

William Savery died on June 19, 1804, following a short fever.

Savery's daughter-in-law was Rebecca Scattergood Savery.
