= Stan Keller =

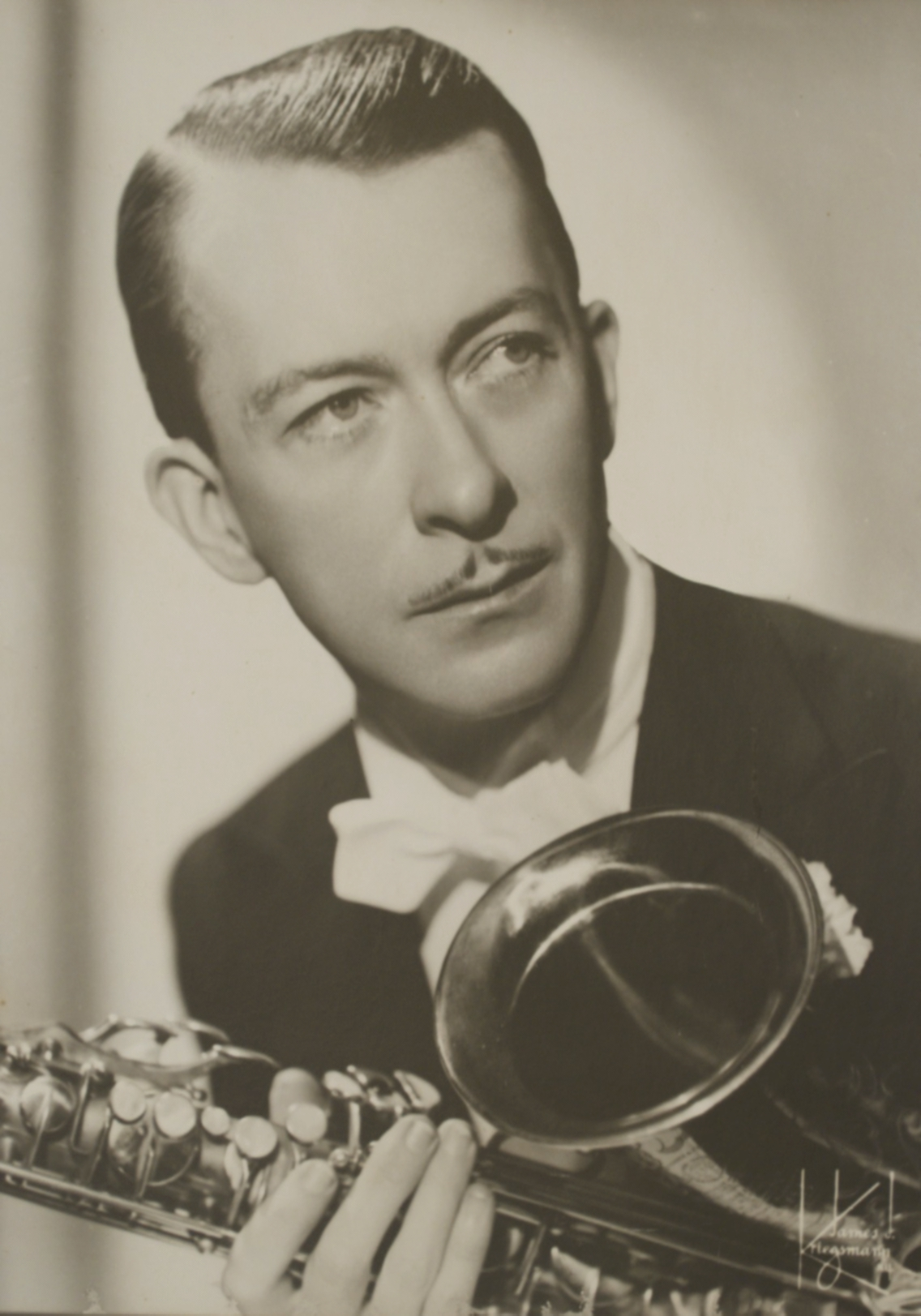
- Photo by James Johann Kriegsmann (1911-1994); New York

Background information
- Birth name: Stanley Keller Grubb
- Born: May 1, 1907; Reading, Pennsylvania
- Died: August 7, 1990 (aged 83); Arvada, Colorado
- Genres: Jazz, Swing, Dixieland, Big band, Polkas
- Occupation(s): Bandleader; Saxophonist; Composer
- Instrument(s): Woodwinds, Saxophone, Clarinet, Flute, Bassoon, Oboe
- Years active: 1920s - mid 1960s
- Formerly of: Stan Keller and His Orchestra

Stan Keller (né Stanley Keller Grubb, May 1, 1907 – August 7, 1990) was an American musician, composer, and bandleader.

== Stan Keller Orchestra ==
While performing at the Stork Club in New York City, Sherman Billingsley, the proprietor, often referred to Keller's group as the "Ork of Stork" ("ork" being colloquial for "orchestra").

== Biography ==
Stanley Keller Grubb's parents were Benjamin Franklin Grubb (b. 1873), a steam shovel operator in Birdsboro, Pennsylvania and Elizabeth (née Keller) Grubb (b. 1872). The family descended from John Grubb, who came to the Delaware Valley from Cornwall in 1677. The youngest of four children, Stan mastered the clarinet, all saxophones, flute, piccolo, oboe, English horn, and bassoon. He performed with the Philadelphia Orchestra at age 13.
