= Dale Grubb =

American politician (born 1949)

Member of the Indiana House of Representatives from the 42nd district
- In office November 9, 1988 – November 7, 2012
- Preceded by: James Leroy Clingan
- Succeeded by: Alan Morrison

Personal details
- Born: Floyd Dale Grubb; June 26, 1949 (age 77) Fountain County, Indiana, US
- Party: Democratic
- Spouse: Phyllis
- Relations: John Grubb
- Education: Purdue University
- Occupation: Farmer

Floyd Dale Grubb (born June 26, 1949) is an American politician who served as a member of the Indiana House of Representatives, representing the 42nd District since 1988. He is a member of the Democratic Party.

== Early life, education and career ==
Born on June 26, 1949, in Fountain County, Indiana, Grubb is the son of William H. Grubb, a farmer in Covington, Indiana and Laveda B. Davis. The family is descended from John Grubb. In 1965, Grubb became a page in the Indiana Assembly. In 1967, he was elected as a democratic precinct captain, graduating from Purdue University that same year. After graduating, he joined the Indiana Air Force Reserves and trained as a nurse. Grubb worked at a bank in Michigan City, Indiana, but returned to his Covington farm in 1974. He also established a grain and commodity brokerage in 1980.

== Politics ==
In 1988, the local Assembly seat became vacant and Grubb was elected that November. Grubb has been a leading advocate for agricultural interests and was the prime sponsor of organ donor legislation. He is also noted for his strong opposition to eastern daylight saving time that causes serious problems in western Indiana because of its proximity to Illinois, which is in the central time zone. After only six years in office, Assembly democrats elected Grubb as their leader. While the registration in his district is evenly divided, Grubb consistently receives over 60% of the votes.

== Family ==
Grubb is married to his wife Phyllis and together they have 7 children.

== Education ==
In 1971, Grubb received his BS from Purdue University.
