= Edward Grubb =

Edward Grubb may refer to:

- Edward Grubb of Birmingham (1740–1816), English sculptor
- Edward Burd Grubb Jr. (1841–1913), American soldier and diplomat
- Edward Grubb (Quaker) (1854–1939), British Quaker pacifist and hymnist
- Edward Burd Grubb Sr. (1810–1867), American businessman and abolitionist
