= Warner Norton Grubb =

American businessman

- Born: April 29, 1900; Philadelphia, Pennsylvania
- Died: February 13, 1947 (aged 46); New York City, New York
- Burial place: Arlington National Cemetery
- Military career
- Allegiance: United States of America
- Branch: United States Navy
- Service years: 1918, 1942-1945
- Rank: Commodore
- Units: Army-Navy Petroleum Board (1942-1943), SHAEF (1943-1944), Allied Tanker Coordination Committee (1945)
- Conflicts: World War II
- Awards: Legion of Merit
- Other work: ESSO

Warner Norton Grubb (April 29, 1900 – February 13, 1947) was an American petroleum executive who served as a senior petroleum distribution officer with the U.S. Navy during World War II. He was assigned as Head of the Latin American section of the Army-Navy Petroleum Board, Tanker Control Officer for the European Theater, and finally as Executive Officer of the Allied Tanker Board. At the end of the conflict, he was promoted to Commodore and awarded the Legion of Merit.

== Biography ==
W. Norton Grubb was born in Philadelphia and was the son of Edith (Norton) and Warner Grubb, a forman for the Fells Soap company. After graduation from South Philadelphia High School in 1917, Norton served briefly as a seaman in the Navy Reserves during World War I before majoring in chemistry at Penn State. In 1920, Grubb was an alternate on the U.S. rowing team at the Antwerp Olympics. The next year, he joined the Atlantic Refining Company in Philadelphia and by 1929 was promoted to Director, Atlantic Refining of Africa. In 1931, Norton was transferred to Sydney, Australia. Two years later, he was hired by ESSO as President of the West Indies Oil Company in Latin America and later promoted as a Director in London. Norton was finally transferred back to ESSO Manhattan headquarters in 1939.

In 1941, Grubb represented the company in negotiations with the British Government in London from February through June. Upon his return to the United States, he was interviewed by the New York Times concerning Great Britain's oil supplies. In October 1942, he was commissioned as a Navy lieutenant commander and assigned to Washington, D.C. as Head of the Latin American section of the Army-Navy Petroleum Board. At the end of December 1943, he was reassigned as Tanker Control Officer for the European Theater in London. Promoted to captain in May 1944, Grubb was transferred back to Washington in December as Executive Officer of the Allied Tanker Board until September 1945.

== Legion of Merit citation ==
From 6 November 1942 to 27 December 1944, Commodore Grubb served as Head of the Latin American Section of the Army-Navy Petroleum Board, Tanker Control Officer with the Commander of Naval Forces in Europe, and Navy representative in the Petroleum Section of the staff of the Supreme Commander of the Allied Expeditionary Force. His responsibilities included organising petroleum supplies for Latin America and Allied naval forces in Europe, as well as improving tanker communications security. His work was recognised for its contribution to Allied wartime operations.

For the President, James Forrestal, Secretary of the Navy"

== Personal life ==
In 1921, Norton Grubb married Edith Rosemary Class (1900–1981) of Darby, Pennsylvania. They had two children: Warner Norton Grubb Jr. and George Craig Grubb. After the war, Commodore Grubb returned to ESSO in Manhattan where he was responsible for Northern European operations. In December 1946, he was diagnosed with Hodgkin's lymphoma and died at age 46. He is buried in Arlington National Cemetery. His grandson was Dr. Warner Norton Grubb III, an education economist and David Gardner chair of higher education at Berkeley. The family is descended from John Grubb, who came from Cornwall in 1677 and settled in Delaware.
