= Rhino tank =

Allied tank modification during World War II

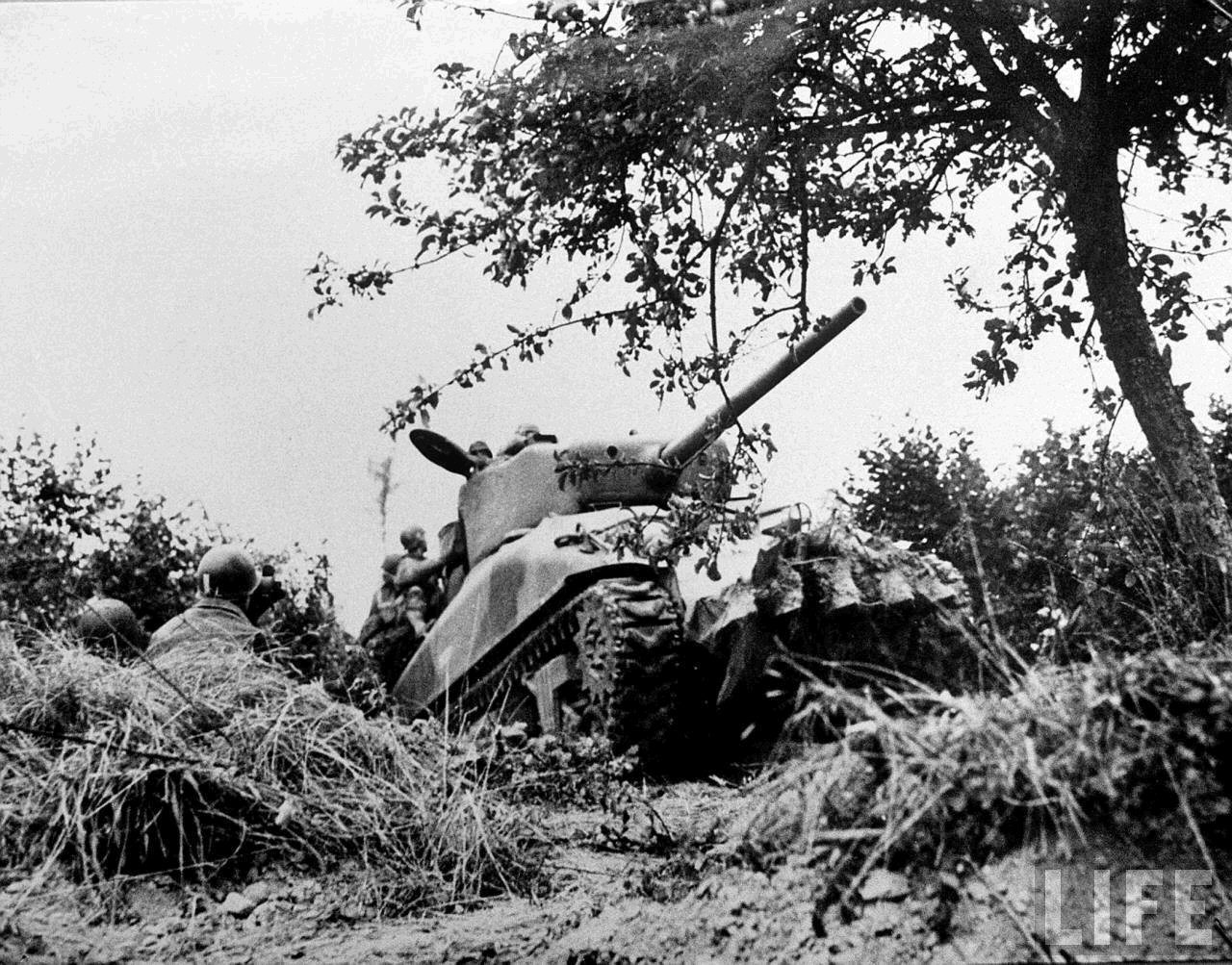
- An M4A1 (76) W-based United States Rhino tank crashes through a hedgerow.

Service history
- In service: 1944
- Used by: Canada, United Kingdom, United States
- Wars: World War II

Production history
- Designer: Various, but generally credited to Curtis G. Culin
- Designed: 1944

"Rhino tank" (initially called "Rhinoceros") was the American nickname for Allied tanks fitted with "tusks", or bocage cutting devices, during World War II. The British designation for the modifications was prongs.

In the summer of 1944, during the Battle of Normandy, Allied forces—particularly the Americans—had become bogged down fighting the Germans in the Normandy bocage. This landscape of thick, banked dirt and rock walls covered with trees and hedges proved difficult for tanks to breach. In an effort to restore battlefield mobility, various devices were invented to allow tanks to navigate the terrain. Initially the devices were manufactured in Normandy, largely from German steel-beam beach defensive devices on an ad hoc basis. Manufacture was then shifted to the United Kingdom, and vehicles were modified before being shipped to France.

The devices have been credited with restoring battlefield mobility in the difficult terrain, a claim which some historians question.

== Background ==
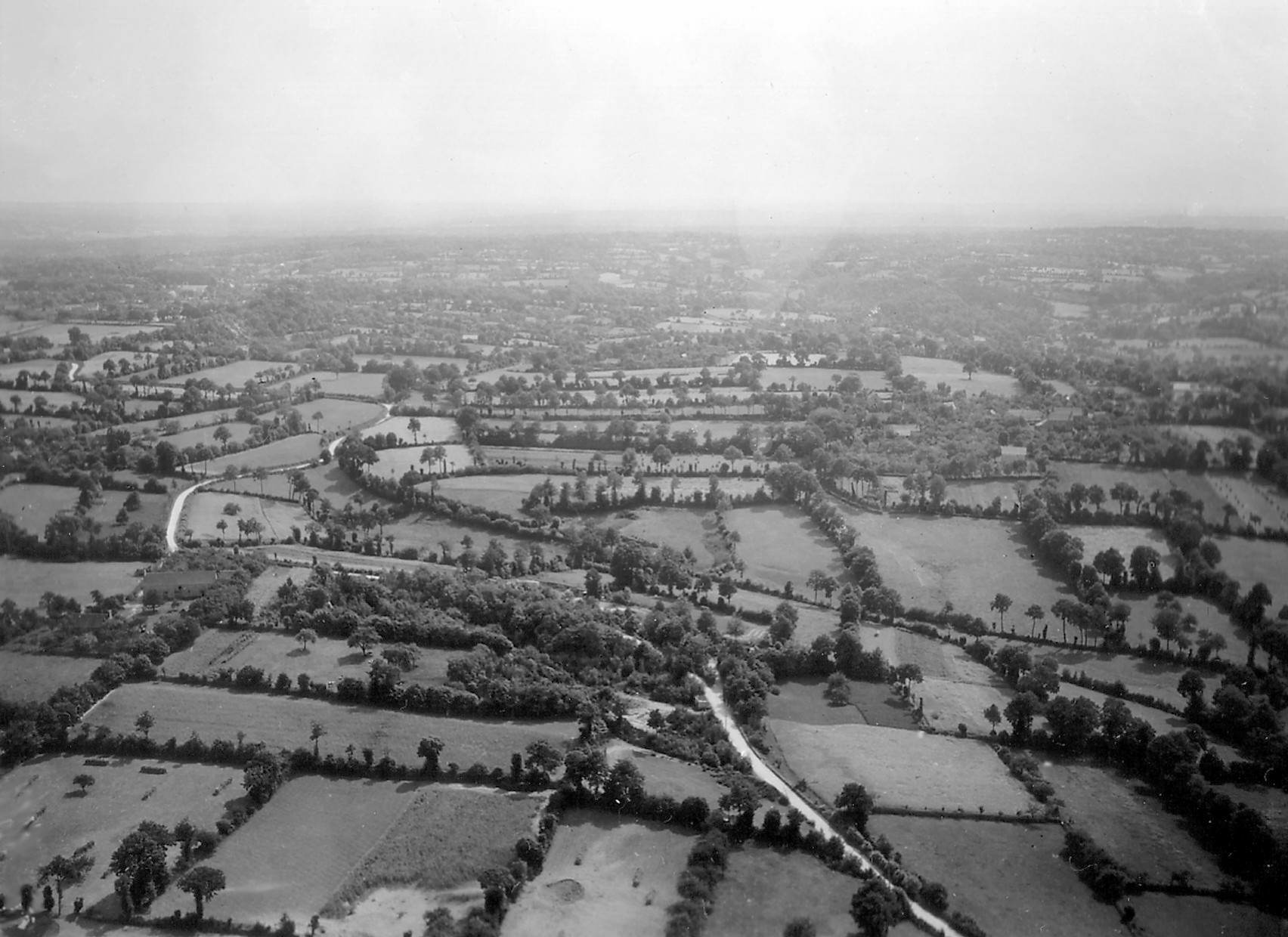
An example of bocage landscape

Following the Normandy landings of June 1944, as Allied forces pushed inland from the French coast, they found themselves operating within an area of Normandy's countryside known as the bocage. The actual bocage landscape extends further than the limited definition of bocage normand, that is to say, from the area directly west of Arromanches-les-Bains, including the entire Cotentin Peninsula, to the south of Brittany, Maine, and Vendée. In some areas, this terrain stretches for 50 miles (80 kilometres). This landscape contained large earth dikes averaging 4 ft (1.2 m) high that were covered with tangled hedges, bushes, and trees that surrounded small raised irregular-sized fields, which were generally no more than 300 ft (91 m) across on a side. The nature of the hedgerows—"sturdy embankments, half earth, half hedge" up to 15 ft (4.6 m) high with sturdy, interlocking root systems—made excavating them extremely difficult, even with machinery. Narrow sunken roads were the only pathways between these banks. Tank movement was severely restricted, preventing the Allied forces from bringing their vehicular superiority to bear. The rolling landscape was also dotted with small rivers, woods, and fruit trees, along with scattered stone farmhouses and their outbuildings.

Allied infantry, in particular the Americans, found themselves fighting from field to field against the Germans, who had in many places dug foxholes directly into the hedgerow embankments, providing their machine gunners and riflemen protection from overhead artillery fire. These defensive positions limited the ability of the American forces to coordinate large-scale attacks or receive sufficient and accurate artillery support. Openings that did exist within the patchwork of hedges were already covered by German anti-personnel and anti-tank weapons; armor moving through these gaps attracted immediate defensive fire. Tanks were able to push their way over the hedgerows, but in doing so they exposed their weak underside armor. Tactical developments throughout June involved combat engineers using explosives to blow holes in the hedgerows for tanks to move through; however, the explosions often attracted immediate German attention.

== Invention ==
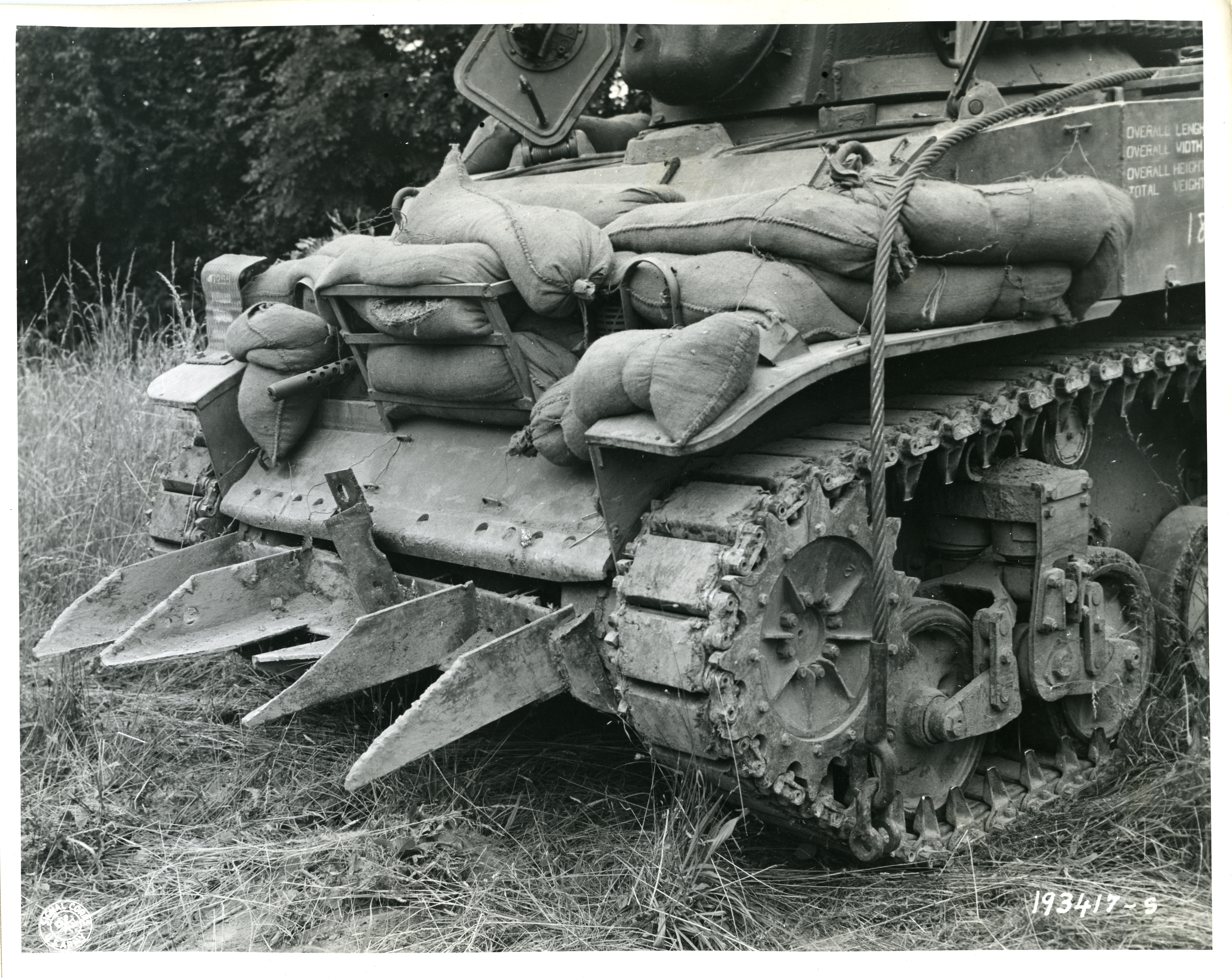
A M5 Stuart light tank, fitted with a Culin-style "cutter"

Prior to the launch of Operation Cobra (an American offensive during the Normandy campaign), solutions were developed for how tanks could effectively support the offensive within this terrain. Bulldozers or tanks modified to carry a bulldozer blade were used to open gaps in hedgerows. Some hedgerows were so thick that engineers first had to blow a hole in the bank, which a bulldozer would later clear and widen. This time-consuming process slowed down the progress of the Allied offensive, and was compounded by the problem of the conspicuous bulldozers and dozer tanks being targeted by German gunners to deny the Allies a means to break through. Throughout July "innumerable" inventions were created by various American units to get tanks through the hedges quickly without exposing their weak underside armor. A hedgecutter developed by the 79th Infantry Division was in operation by 5 July, and a few days later, XIX Corps demonstrated a set of prongs that had been initially developed to create holes for the placement of explosives. The force of these prongs was able to lift and remove a portion of the hedgerow, enough so that the tank would be able to push on through to the other side. Units within V Corps also invented devices, which were dubbed 'brush cutters' and 'greendozers'.

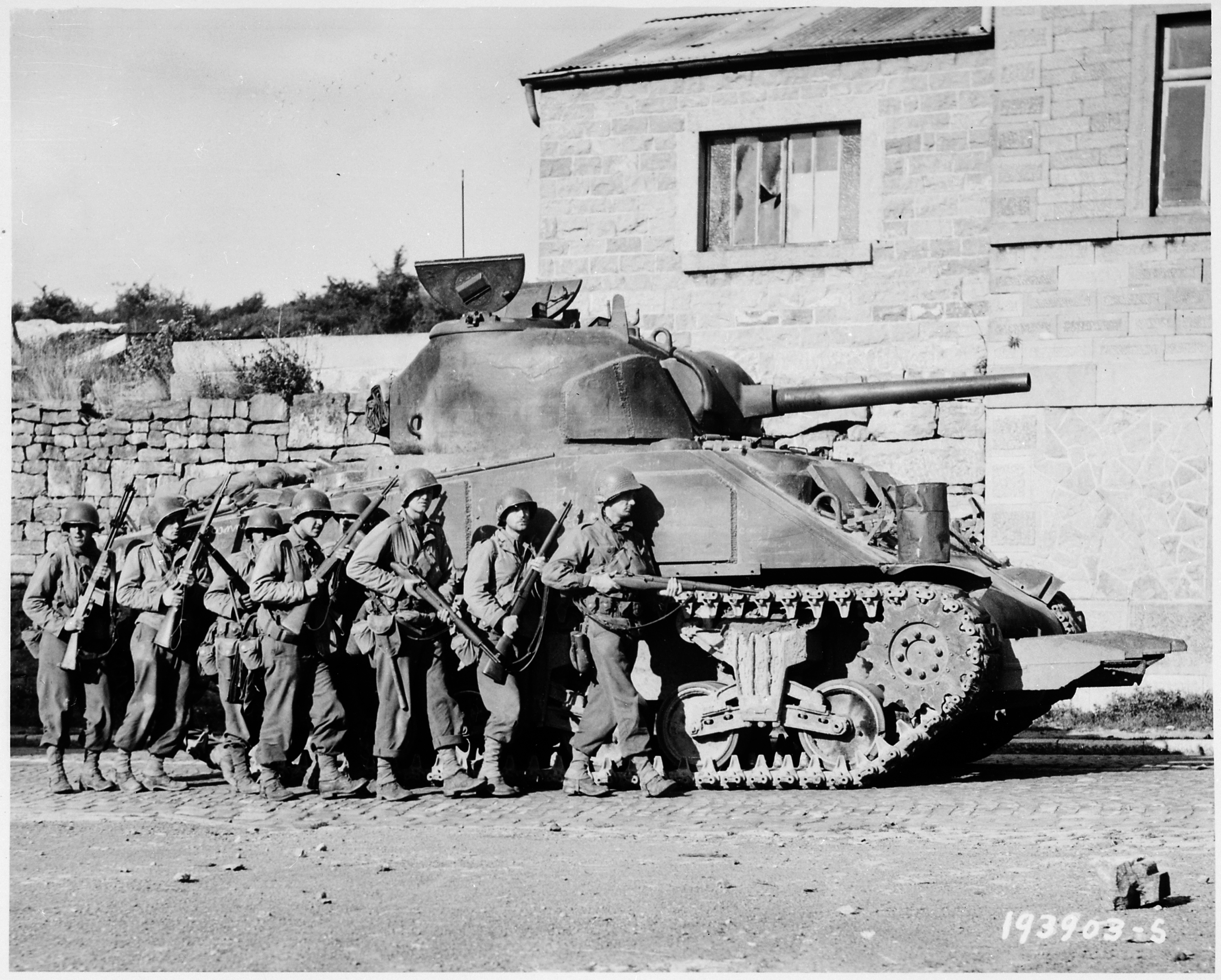
An American M4 Sherman tank with hedgerow breaching modifications

The invention of a hedge-breaching device is generally credited to Curtis G. Culin, a sergeant in the 2nd Armored Division's 102nd Cavalry Reconnaissance Squadron. However, military historian Max Hastings notes that Culin was inspired by "a Tennessee hillbilly named Roberts", who during a discussion about how to overcome the bocage, said "Why don't we get some saw teeth and put them on the front of the tank and cut through these hedges?" Rather than joining in the laughter that greeted this remark, Culin recognized the idea's potential. A prototype tusk-like assembly was created by welding steel scrap (from destroyed "Czech hedgehogs") to the front of a tank to create a hedge cutter. The teeth helped prevent the vulnerable underside of the tank from being exposed while it knocked a hole in the hedgerow wall. On 14 July, Lieutenant General Omar Bradley inspected the tank and "watched in awe as a hedgerow exploded ... to make way for the Sherman bursting through". According to Hastings, Culin, "an honest man", attempted to give credit to Roberts, but this was forgotten in the publicity surrounding the invention. Hastings concludes: "[Culin] became a very American kind of national hero".

The American official campaign historian, Martin Blumenson, notes that Bradley, impressed, ordered the device be manufactured in quantity. Initially this was done using steel salvaged from the thousands of obstacles, such as Czech hedgehogs, that the Germans had placed on the French beaches during the construction of the Atlantic Wall. Bradley also dispatched Colonel John Medaris (of the United States Army Ordnance Department) back to the United Kingdom to have tanks modified before being shipped to France, and arranged for additional arc welding equipment and crews to be transported to France by air.

Around 500 of the assemblies, called the "Culin Rhino device" or "Culin hedgerow cutter" by the Americans, were manufactured. These devices were used to modify nearly three-quarters of the US 2nd Armored Division's M4 Sherman and Stuart tanks and M10 tank destroyers in preparation for Operation Cobra. (Note: The US official campaign historian states that by the time Operation Cobra was launched, "three out of every five tanks in the First Army mounted the hedgecutter".) The British Royal Electrical and Mechanical Engineers (REME) referred to the devices as "Prongs" and produced 24 from ex-German beach defenses, but thereafter Prongs were produced in the United Kingdom. Six hundred Mark I Prongs were delivered by August, to be fitted to the Sherman V. A further 1,000 Mark II Prongs were produced, to be fitted on Shermans and the M10, and 500 Mark III prongs were manufactured for the Cromwell tank. The Churchill tanks were not considered to need the Prong, but some were equipped with them nonetheless.

== Usage ==
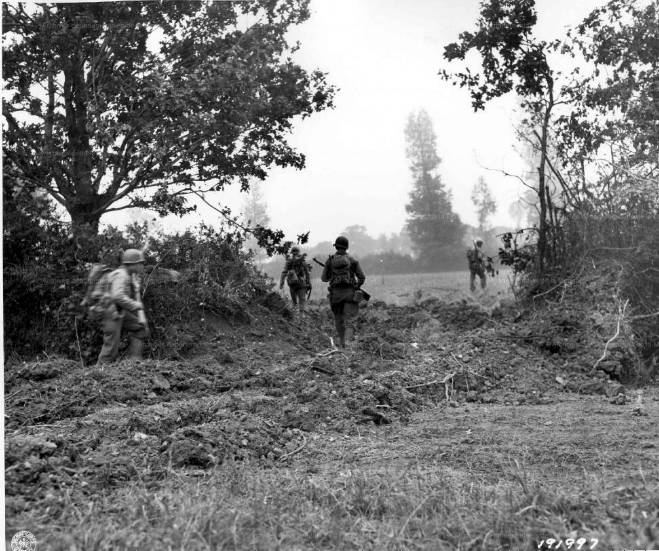
American infantry advancing through a gap created by a Rhino

War correspondent Chester Wilmot wrote after the war that the German defensive plan to halt any American breakout was to hold the front line "very lightly and to concentrate upon holding the road junctions for a depth of three or four miles behind the front", with the intention of delaying any break-through by reducing the speed of the advance to the pace the infantry could manage. Once Operation Cobra was launched, Allied troops were able to bypass the German positions using the Rhino tanks, thereby allowing the advance to continue, leaving the strong points to be dealt with by infantry and engineers.

Blumenson describes how during the launch of Operation Cobra, tanks with the 2nd Infantry Division, supported by artillery, advanced without infantry for twenty minutes, covering several hundred yards and knocking holes in hedgerows before returning to their starting position. The tanks and infantry then advanced rapidly together before the Germans were able to re-establish their defensive positions.

During Operation Bluecoat (a British offensive during the Normandy campaign), British Churchill tanks (Note: These tanks were of the 6th Guards Tank Brigade.) equipped with Prongs were able to traverse terrain considered impassable to tracked vehicles, taking the German defenders by surprise.

Military historian Steven Zaloga claims that the devices "were not as widely used as the legend would suggest", nor were they as effective as is often believed. But Max Hastings and Chester Wilmot credit the invention with restoring battlefield maneuverability to the Allied force. Martin Blumenson states that while the device restored mobility in hedgerow country, it "was of little tactical value in the breakout, except possibly as a morale factor to the troops, since the tanks advanced on the roads, not cross-country."

== See also ==
- Allied technological cooperation during World War II
- Hobart's Funnies
