= Ignatius Cooper Grubb =

American politician

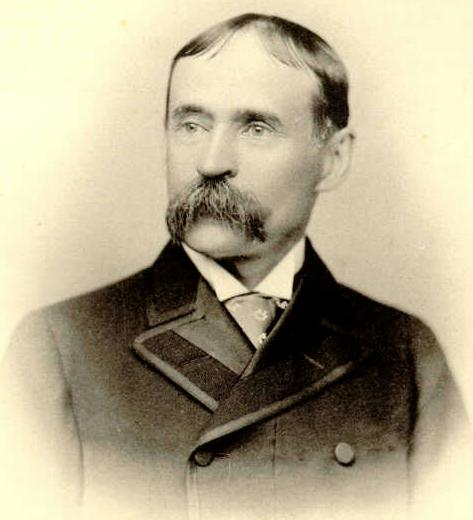

Assoc. Justice, Delaware Court of Errors and Appeals and Assoc. Justice at large of the Delaware Supreme Court
- In office 1886–1909
- Nominated by: Charles C. Stockley

Personal details
- Born: April 12, 1841 Brandywine Hundred, Delaware
- Died: June 20, 1927 (aged 86) Wilmington, Delaware
- Education: Yale

Ignatius Cooper Grubb (April 12, 1841 – June 20, 1927) was a Delaware politician, jurist and historian who served as an associate justice of the Court of Errors and Appeals from 1886 to 1897 and as the Associate Justice at large of the Delaware Supreme Court from 1897 to 1909. As Secretary of State under Governor John P. Cochran from 1875 to 1879, he became involved in a boundary dispute with New Jersey that was not resolved until 1935. He is best remembered as the champion for legislative reapportionment in Delaware in the 1880s and 90s and as the author of an 1896 history of the Delaware judiciary.

== Biography ==
Born in Brandywine Hundred, Delaware, Ignatius was the son of Wellington and Beulah (Allmond) Grubb, farmers north of Wilmington on the Delaware River. His family lived in the area since the early 1680s when John Grubb settled at a place still known as Grubb's Landing. Orphaned at age 11, Ignatius and his sister Louisa where under the guardianship of Wilmington lawyer, Victor du Pont. After graduating from Yale, Grubb studied law under his guardian and was admitted to the bar in 1862.

A Democrat, Ignatius Grubb was appointed clerk of the Delaware Assembly in 1867, Deputy Attorney General in 1869 and Wilmington City solicitor in 1871. Three years later, he was John P. Cochran's campaign manager and was appointed Secretary of State after Cochran was elected Governor. During the Cochran administration, New Jersey and Delaware disputed fishing rights in the Delaware River south of the state's border with Pennsylvania. At Grubb's suggestion, the controversy was referred to the Supreme Court, but the issue was not finally settled until 1935.

After his term as Secretary of State, Ignatius became a party leader and a member of the Democratic National Committee. He took up the cause of legislative reapportionment. At that time, Delaware's three counties had equal representation even though New Castle (which includes Wilmington) had a substantially larger population than the other two. Grubb drafted a constitutional amendment that was adopted by both houses in 1883. However, to become law the amendment also had to be approved by the Assembly elected the following year. In 1884, the amendment was unanimously endorsed at the party convention, but was defeated by one vote after the election when downstate members defected. Even though Governor Stockley appointed Ignatius to the non-political post of Associate Justice of the Court of Appeals for life in 1887, Grubb continued to call for a new constitutional convention. When the convention was finally held in 1897, Wilmington was given additional representatives.

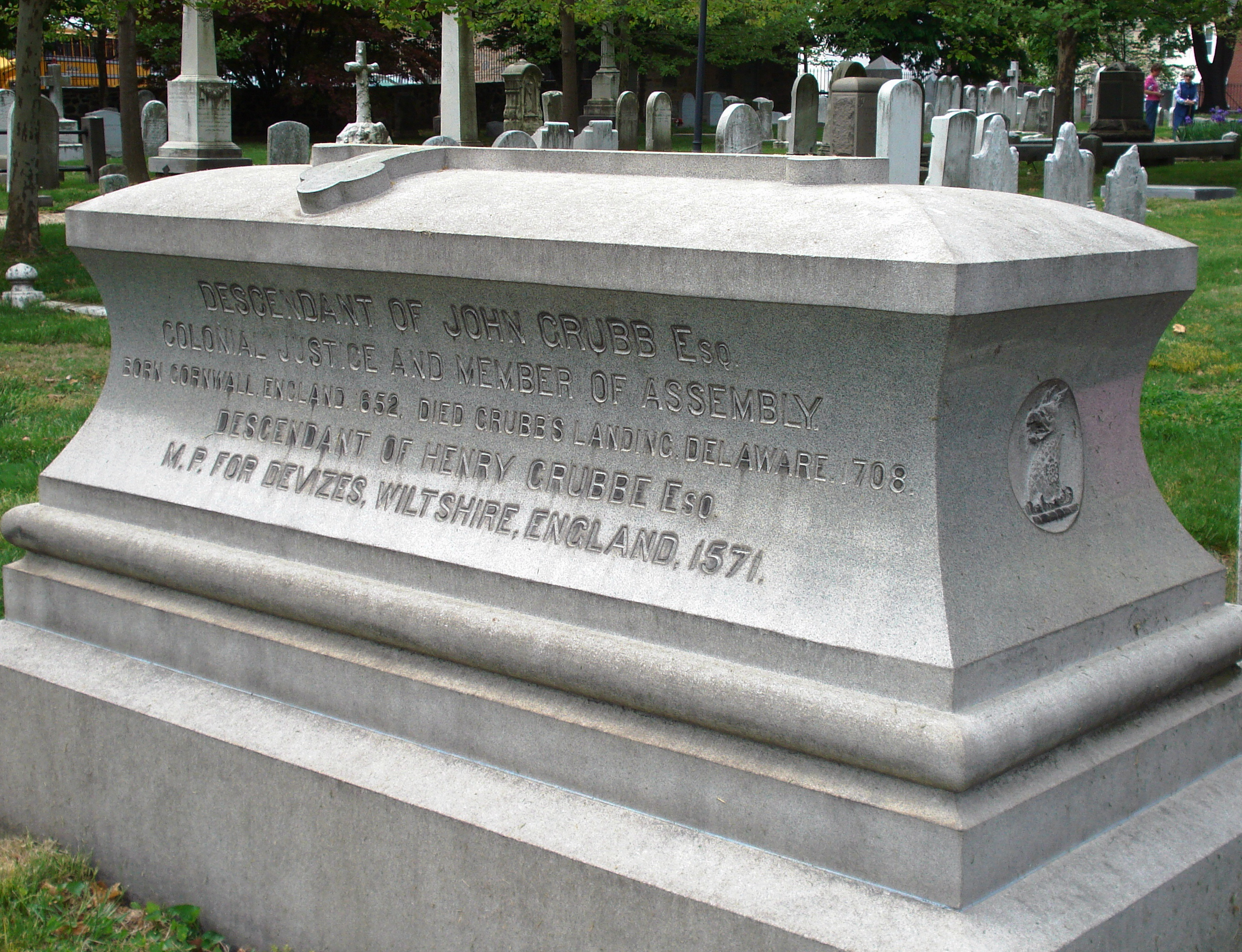
Ignatius Cooper Grubb's grave at Old Swedes in Wilmington

The next year, the new constitution reorganized the courts and abolished life tenure. Under the new structure, the Supreme Court consisted of a Chief Justice, one Associate Justice for each county, and one Associate Justice at large, all serving twelve year terms. Grubb was appointed to the at large position. While expanded, the court continued to use a unique "leftover-judge" system, where appeals were heard by a panel of three judges from either the Superior Court or the Court of Chancery who were not involved in the matter on appeal. Chief Justice James Pennewill, who headed the court after Ignatius retired, recollected that "Grubb wanted time, and much time, to think about the case and if he wrote the opinion, he did it with the utmost care. It was revised and re-revised until he believed it perfect in substance and form."

== Personal life ==
Ignatius was a bachelor and extensively traveled in Europe and Asia. In 1895, while returning from Japan, he was asked by the President of Hawaii to intercede with his political friends to help reduce senatorial opposition to the annexation of Hawaii. In 1902, he made a trip on the first modern submarine, the Holland. During World War I, despite being in his 70s, Grubb served in a gun crew on a British merchant ship. In 1919, he flew to Wilmington on an early seaplane.

Interested in history, Grubb was a director of the Delaware Historical Society and in 1896 delivered a paper on history of the Delaware Judiciary from Colonial times. He also compiled an extensive family genealogy and met with his distant cousin, Civil War General Edward Burd Grubb to share research. Both the General and the Judge believed that the family was descended from some notable British ancestors including a 16th-century member of Parliament. More recent research has disproved these claims. Grubb died in an accident at home while preparing to leave for a vacation and his tomb has become a stop on the tours at Old Swedes' Church.
