= Nathaniel Grubb =

Member, Provincial Assembly
- In office 1749–1758

Personal details
- Born: c. 1693 Brandywine Hundred, Delaware Colony, British America
- Died: 1760 Willistown, Province of Pennsylvania, British America
- Profession: Mill Owner

Nathaniel Grubb (c.1693–1760) was a Willistown mill owner who served ten years in the Pennsylvania Colonial Assembly from 1749 to 1758. A member of the Quaker religious sect, he broke with the Society during the conservative reform movement and sponsored important legislation promoting military preparations for the French and Indian War. His politically incorrect comments about the Scotch Irish are still quoted.

== Biography ==
Grubb was born in Brandywine Hundred, Delaware and was the son of John Grubb and his wife Frances. One of Nathaniel's brothers was Peter Grubb who founded Cornwall Furnace. By the mid-1720s, Nathaniel was a carpenter and a member of the Concord Friends Meetinghouse. His political career started in 1736 when he was appointed Willistown’s constable. Five years later, he assisted laying out a road from Chester County to High Street ferry in Philadelphia. In 1742, he became overseer of the poor and supervisor of highways two years later.

During the 1749 Assembly election, Chester County replaced four of its eight representatives, and three of the new freshmen including Grubb were Quakers. During his first five years, Grubb was a stanch Quaker backbencher. In 1753 he was one of eight Quakers to vote against all proposals to finance military preparations for the defense of Pennsylvania against the French threat.

In 1755, Grubb changed his position. That year, six Quakers associated with the conservative reform movement resigned in protest. Nathaniel refused to join them and accepted an assignment to the seven-member committee considering the militia bill. That fall, many of the remaining Quakers refused to run for reelection and in 1756 another four resigned, including two from Chester County. However, Nathaniel remained in the Assembly and helped draft the bill that established guidelines for the use of privately owned wagons and horses to transport military supplies. In 1758, the Philadelphia Yearly Meeting condemned this bill as essentially repugnant to that liberty of conscience for which early Friends deeply suffered. Grubb however, was not formally censured for his role in its passage.

Nathaniel occasionally made comments that were less than politically correct. For example, in 1756 William Smith’s "A Brief View of the Conduct of Pennsylvania" charged that Grubb declared after hearing the news of the attacks on frontier inhabitants that "they are a pack of insignificant Scotch-Irish, who, if they were all killed, could well enough be spared." Grubb responded in The Pennsylvania Gazette that the report was "a wicked falsehood and without the least foundation."

During this period, Nathaniel also held several other significant posts. In 1755, he was appointed as a commissioner to provide for the Arcadian exiles in Philadelphia and three years later served as a Trustee of the Province Loan office. During his last year in the Assembly, he helped draft the law changing the terms under which Judges held their office. About this time, his wife died and Nathaniel did not stand for reelection in the fall of 1758 because of failing health.

== Personal life ==
On October 23, 1725, Grubb married Ann Moore, daughter of John and Margaret Moore of Thornbury Township and had eight children. They settled in Willistown Township where he purchased 500 acres (2.0 km^{2}) by deed of November 16, 1726. Nathaniel and Ann became members of the Goshen Meeting, but were not especially active in church affairs. In addition to his mill on Crum Creek, he also owned property in Marcus Hook and several houses and lots in Philadelphia, which apparently he rented to tenants.
