= Curtis G. Culin =

American soldier

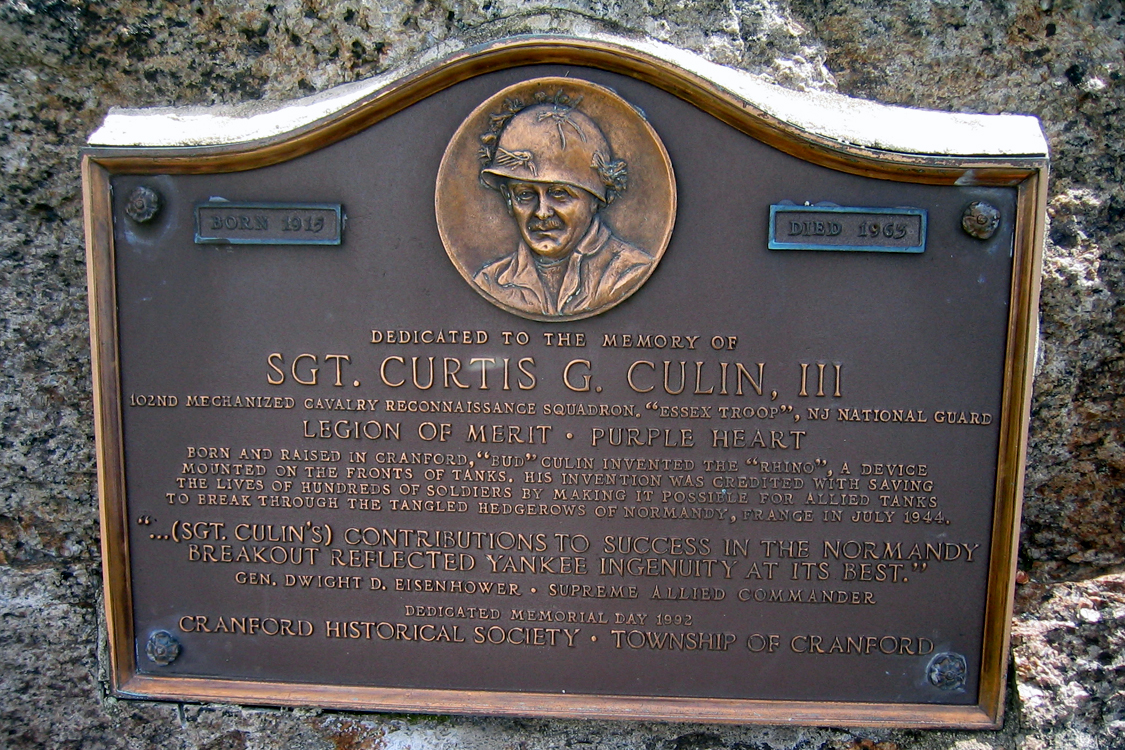
The Curtis G. Culin III memorial in his hometown of Cranford, New Jersey

Sgt Curtis Grubb Culin III (February 10, 1915 – November 20, 1963) was a World War II soldier credited with the invention of a hedge-breaching device fitted to Allied armored vehicles during the Battle of Normandy. As they moved inland after the D-Day landings, the Allies found their tanks were unable to operate easily or safely in the Normandy Bocage country. Instead of breaking through the thickly packed earthen banks – up to man-high – below tall hedges, the tanks could only ride over top of the banks, exposing their thinly armored undersides to attack, defenseless against enemy infantry anti-tank weapons.

A native of Cranford, New Jersey, Culin was serving as a tanker with the 102nd Cavalry Reconnaissance Squadron (New Jersey National Guard, the "Essex Troop," 2nd Armored Division) when he came up with the four-pronged plow device created from scrap steel from German anti-tank beach obstacles. When attached to the front of his tank it was successful in rapidly plowing gaps in the earthen banks beneath the Bocage hedgerows. Military historian Max Hastings notes that Culin was inspired by "a Tennessee hillbilly named Roberts", who during a discussion about how the bocage could be overcome said "Why don't we get some saw teeth and put them on the front of the tank and cut through these hedges?" Rather than joining in the laughter that greeted this remark, Culin realised the idea's potential and put together a prototype tusk-like assembly welded to the front of a tank. In due course this was demonstrated to General Bradley, who "watched in awe as a hedgerow exploded ... to make way for the Sherman bursting through". According to Hastings, Culin, "an honest man", attempted to give credit to Roberts but this was forgotten in the publicity surrounding the invention. Hastings concludes: "[Culin] became a very American kind of national hero".

Bradley ordered that as many Sherman tanks as possible be fitted with the device. By the launch of Operation Cobra, some 60 percent of First Army tanks were so equipped.

Culin received the Legion of Merit.

Four months after his invention, he lost a leg to a land mine in the Huertgen Forest. When he returned to the United States, he became a salesman for Schenley Industries, Inc., liquor distributors.

== Eisenhower speech ==
Culin was mentioned in one of the last addresses by Dwight D. Eisenhower as President of the United States, in a January 10, 1961, speech to the American Society of Mechanical Engineers:

There was a little sergeant. His name was Culin, and he had an idea. And his idea was that we could fasten knives, great big steel knives, in front of these tanks, and as they came along they would cut off these banks right at ground level—they would go through on the level keel—would carry with themselves a little bit of camouflage for a while. And this idea was brought to the captain, to the major, to the colonel, and it got high enough that somebody did something about it—and that was General Bradley—and he did it very quickly. Because this seemed like a crazy idea, they did not even go to the engineers very fast, because they were afraid of the technical advice, and then someone did have a big question: "Where are you going to find the steel for all these things?" Well now, happily the Germans tried to keep us from going on the beaches with great steel "chevaux de frise"—big crosses, there were big bars of steel down on the beach where the Germans left it. And he got it—got these things sharpened up—and it worked fine. The biggest and happiest group I suppose in all the Allied Armies that night were those that knew that this thing worked. And it worked beautifully.

Eisenhower repeated this story about Sergeant Culin in 1964 in a television interview with CBS correspondent Walter Cronkite on the 20th anniversary of the D-Day invasion taking place in the actual hedgerow country of France.

== Personal life ==
Curtis G. Culin married Bernice Enright in 1945. They lived in New York City, where he worked for Schenley Industries. "Curtis Grubb" is a third-generation family name arising from Patriot ancestor Col. Curtis Grubb. Curtis was a member of the Sons of the American Revolution. Culin died in Greenwich Village, Manhattan, New York in 1963. He is buried in Westfield, New Jersey.

== See also ==
- Operation Cobra
