= Judge Grubb =

Judge Grubb may refer to:

- Kenneth Philip Grubb (1895–1976), judge of the United States District Court for the Eastern District of Wisconsin
- William Irwin Grubb (1862–1935), judge of the United States District Court for the Northern District of Alabama
