= Peter Grubb =

Peter Grubb may refer to:

- Peter Grubb (mason) (1702–1754), American mason and founder of Grubb family iron dynasty
- Peter Grubb Jr. (1740–1786), American patriot and member of Grubb family iron dynasty
- Peter J. Grubb (born 1935), English ecologist
- Peter Grubb (zoologist) (1942–2006), English zoologist
