= Catharina Elisabet Grubb =

Finnish industrialist

Catharina Elisabet Grubb (February 8, 1721 – March 31, 1788) was a Finnish industrialist.

She was the daughter of merchant Nils Grubb from Stockholm and Gunnila Grubb and sister of Michael Grubb and married to merchant, industrialist and shipowner Johan Jacob Kijk who, as the owner of the manor Tykö Foundry (Tyko bruk), part owner of two tobacco factories in Åbo (Turku), the brick factory in Kuppis (Kupittaa) and the glass factory of Åvik in Somero, was called the richest man in Finland. At the death of her spouse in 1777, she made an agreement with her children that she would manage the entire estate until her death. She was very successful: she developed the cultivation of iron at Tykö (Teijo) and Kirjakkala who became the most successful within the metal industry: by 1784, a third of all iron bought by Åbo came from her.
