= Gunnila Grubb =

Gunnila Grubb (13 January 1692, Stockholm – 20 August 1729, Stockholm) was a Swedish writer. She wrote spiritual songs inspired by Pietism and Mysticism.

Gunnila Grubb was the daughter of the Stockholm merchant Mikael Vilhelmsson Grubb and Katarina Sohm, and was married in 1716 to the merchant Nils Grubb. She was the mother of Michael Grubb, ennobled as af Grubbens, and Catharina Elisabet Grubb.

Grubb was a member of the circles of radical members of Pietism and the Moravian Church. She is referred to as an example of the strong role females could play within these movements.

== Works ==
- Nr 15, 18, 24, 28, 35, 36, 52, 68, 74. 75, 76, 77, 86. 88, 199 in Andeliga Wijsor... (1739)
- Nr 29, 61 in Sions Sånger, Stockholm (1743)
