= Sarah Grubb =

Businesswoman and Quaker benefactor

Sarah Pim Grubb (11 December 1746 – 1832) was a businesswoman and Quaker benefactor in Clonmel, County Tipperary, Ireland. She married a miller and corn dealer named John Grubb in 1778. After her husband's death six years later, she ran his successful milling business, Anner Mills (3 km NE of Clonmel), herself.

== Early life and marriage ==
Sarah Pim was born in 1746 at Mountrath, Queen's County. She was the first child of the wealthy Dublin wool merchant John Pim and his wife, Sarah Clibborn of Moate Castle. Her 15 siblings included Joshua Pim and Joseph Pike Pim, notable merchants of Usher's Island, Dublin. She was related through both her parents to the most prominent Quaker families at that time. The Pim family moved to Middlesex in 1771 where they mixed with fashionable Quaker society in and around London.

In 1778, Sarah Pim married John Grubb, a wealthy flour miller from Clonmel in Ireland. Although a very wealthy family, the Grubbs chose to live very plainly and simply, in the Quaker tradition, in their comfortable home at Anner Mills. They provided hospitality to numerous Quaker travelling ministers e.g. Catherine Phillips, William Savery, Thomas Reddan and Elizabeth Fry.

After John Grubb's death due to overwork in 1784, Sarah Pim Grubb ran the mills herself with the help of her brother Joshua, a Dublin banker. She was independently successful as 'Sarah Grubb, Miller and Corn Dealer'.

== Legacy ==
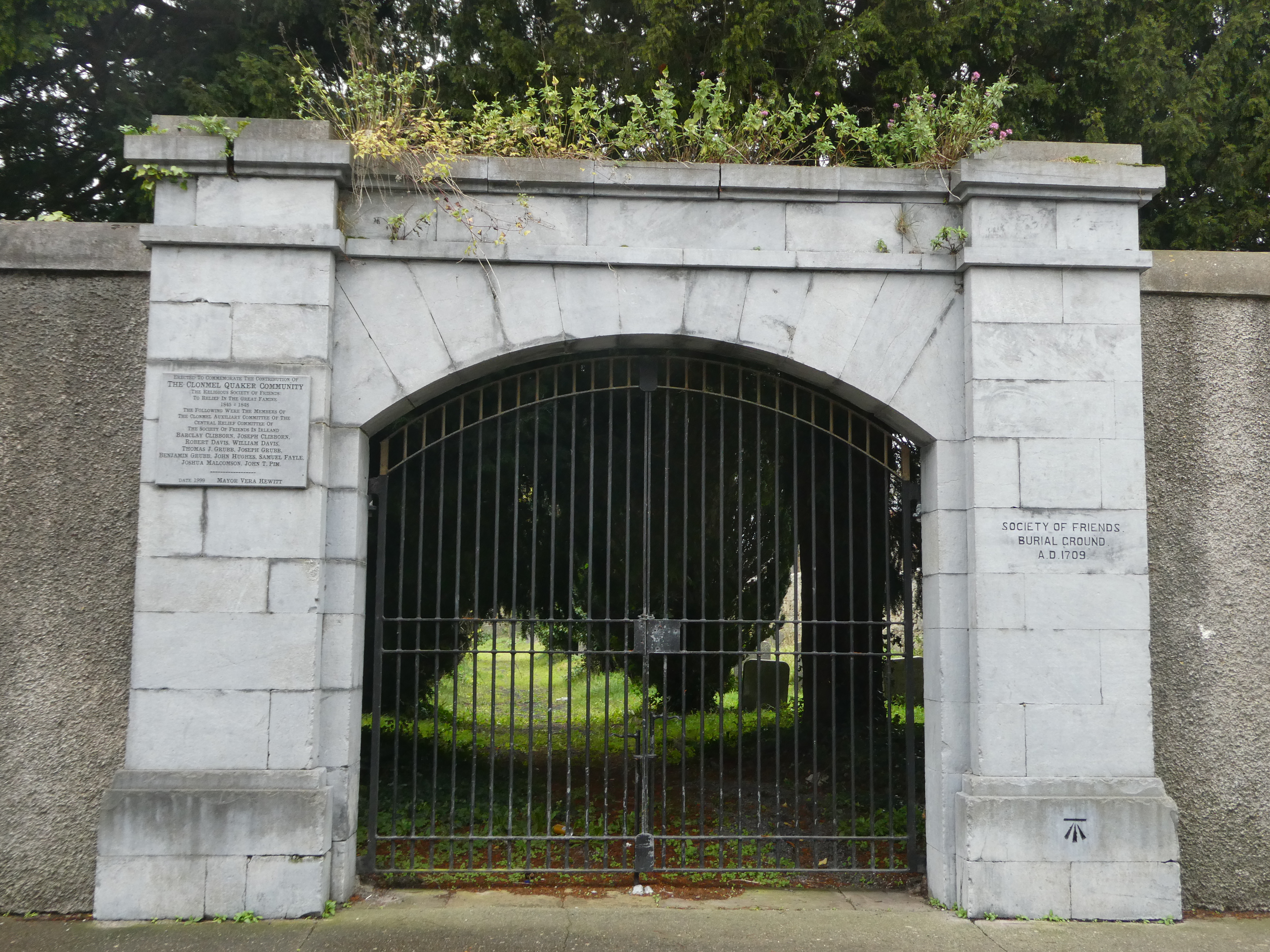
Entrance to the Quaker cemetery in Clonmel, Grubb's burial place

Grubb was greatly interested in social beneficence, a trait which combined with her business acumen, earned her the title 'the Queen of the South'.

She sent aid to those afflicted by the 1798 Rising, helped to found Newtown School in County Waterford, the Garryroan Meeting House in County Tipperary, helped German refugees in London, and helped support the fight against slavery.

She died in 1832 leaving a fortune estimated at £100,000, at her home at Anner Mills. She is buried in the Quaker Burial Ground, Clonmel.
