= Stiegel-Coleman House =

Historic house in Pennsylvania, United States

- U.S. National Register of Historic Places
- U.S. National Historic Landmark
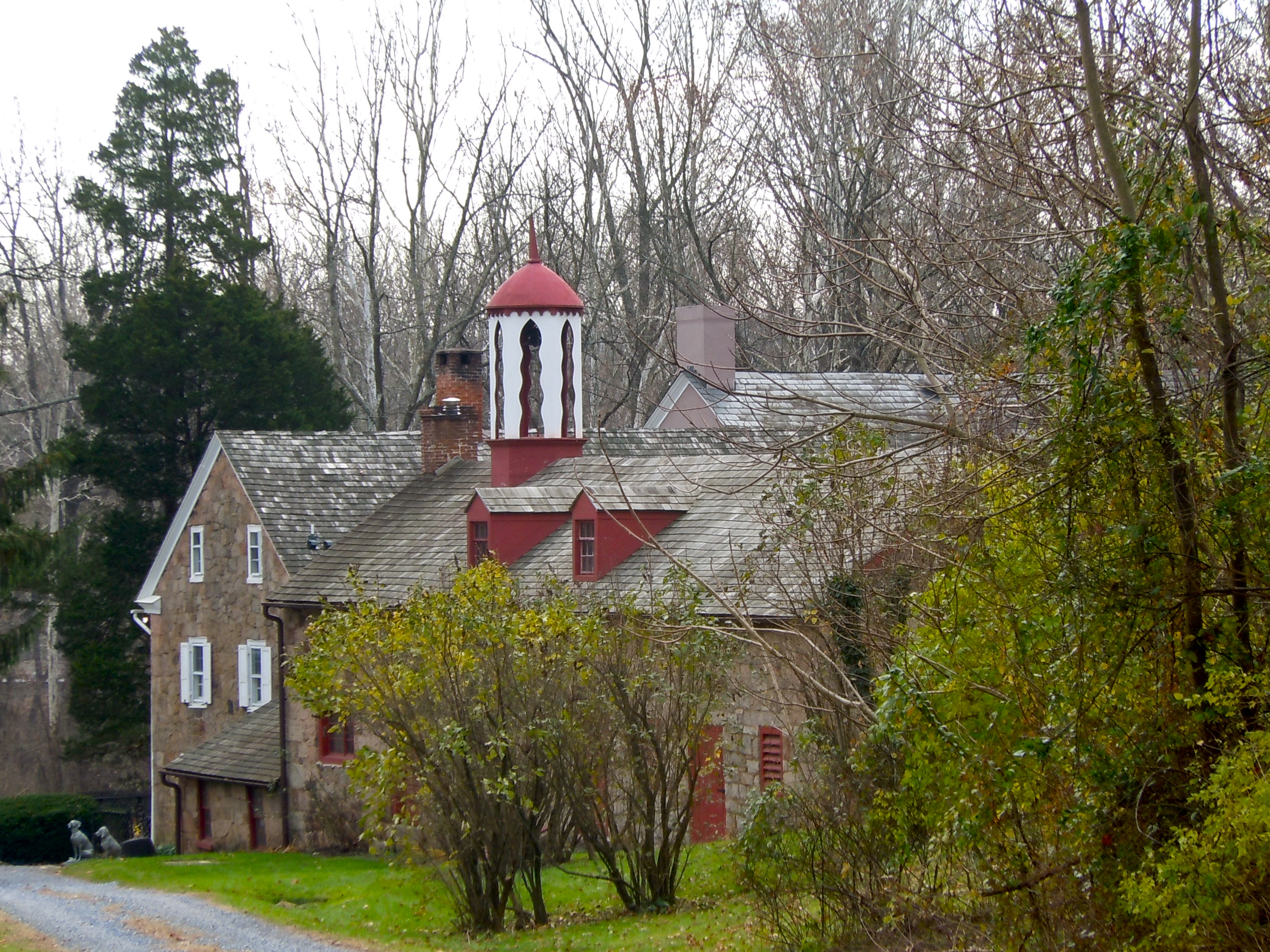

- Location within Pennsylvania Location within the United States
- Interactive map showing the location of Stiegel-Coleman House
- Location: PA 501 north of U.S. 322, near Brickerville, Pennsylvania
- Coordinates: 40.2378°N 76.2968°W
- Area: 85 acres (34 ha)
- Built: 1757
- NRHP reference No.: 66000668

Significant dates
- Added to NRHP: November 13, 1966
- Designated NHL: November 13, 1966

The Stiegel-Coleman House, also known as Elizabeth Farms, is an historic mansion house which is located at 2121 Furnace Hills Pike (Pennsylvania Route 501), just north of Brickerville, Pennsylvania.

Built in 1757 and substantially enlarged in 1780, it was the home of two of colonial Pennsylvania's early iron and glass makers, William Stiegel and Robert Coleman. The furnace they operated, whose archaeological remains were rediscovered in 2004, was one of the most successful in the Thirteen Colonies, and provided war materials for Continental Army.

Their house was declared a National Historic Landmark in 1966. It has remained in the hands of Coleman descendants, mostly as a private residence. Related structures adjacent to the house and dating from the 1700s were renovated and repurposed for an event venue in 2020-21.

== Description and history ==
The Stiegel-Coleman House stands on 34 acres (14 ha) of mostly woodland, on the east side of Furnace Hills Pike just north of the Pennsylvania Turnpike and the village of Brickerville. The house is a multi-winged structure, built primarily out of local stone. The original core of the house is a two-story gabled structure, to which a northward-extending long wing was added, in which both residential and business operations related to the nearby iron furnace were conducted. A tall decorative cupola is mounted on the wing's roof ridge. The core structure was built about 1756–58 by William Stiegel. Attached at an offset on its south side is a two-story gabled structure whose exterior has been finished in plaster.

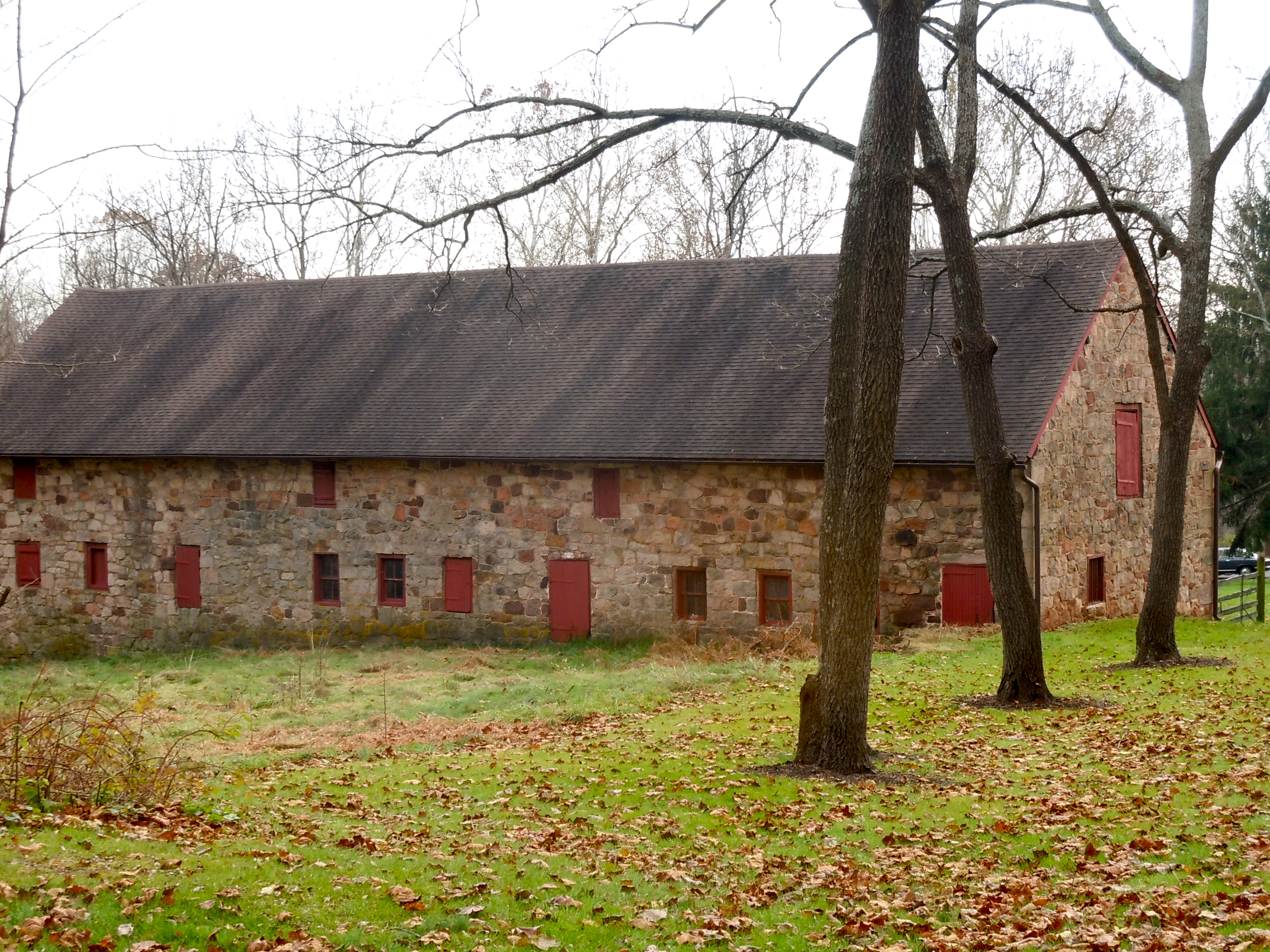
Stable

The property was first developed industrially in 1750 by John Jacob Huber, a German immigrant and ironmaster. Huber's daughter married William Stiegel, also a German immigrant, and it is Stiegel who built the oldest portion of the house now standing. In addition to making iron, Stiegel also established a glassworks here, which he later moved to Manheim. The property was later acquired by Irish immigrant Robert Coleman. Coleman arrived in North America in 1764, and rapidly rose to control several important ironworks in eastern Pennsylvania, including Hopewell Furnace, Speedwell Forge, and Cornwall Furnace. He apparently began to lease Stiegel's furnace around the time of the American Revolutionary War, and eventually purchased it outright. His management of the ironworks benefited from providing cannons for the war effort, and he died as one of the nation's early millionaires.

The house was later occupied by Coleman's great-grandson and heir to the family forturne, Robert Habersham Coleman.

== See also ==
- List of National Historic Landmarks in Pennsylvania
- National Register of Historic Places listings in Lancaster County, Pennsylvania
