= Elizabeth Township, Lancaster County, Pennsylvania =

Township in Pennsylvania, US

Coordinates: 40°17′00″N 76°17′59″W

- Township
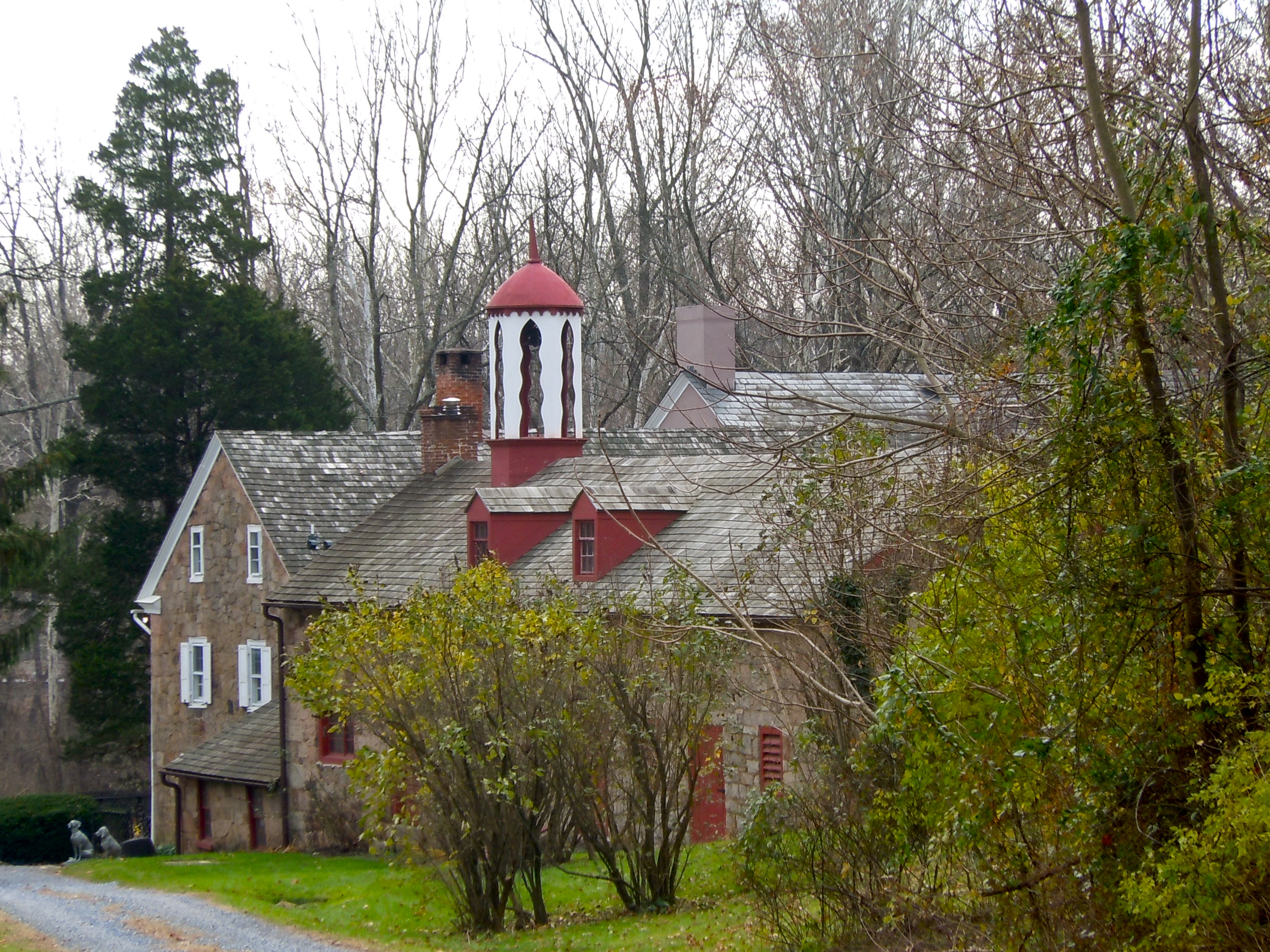
- The Stiegel-Coleman House, a historic site in the township

- Logo

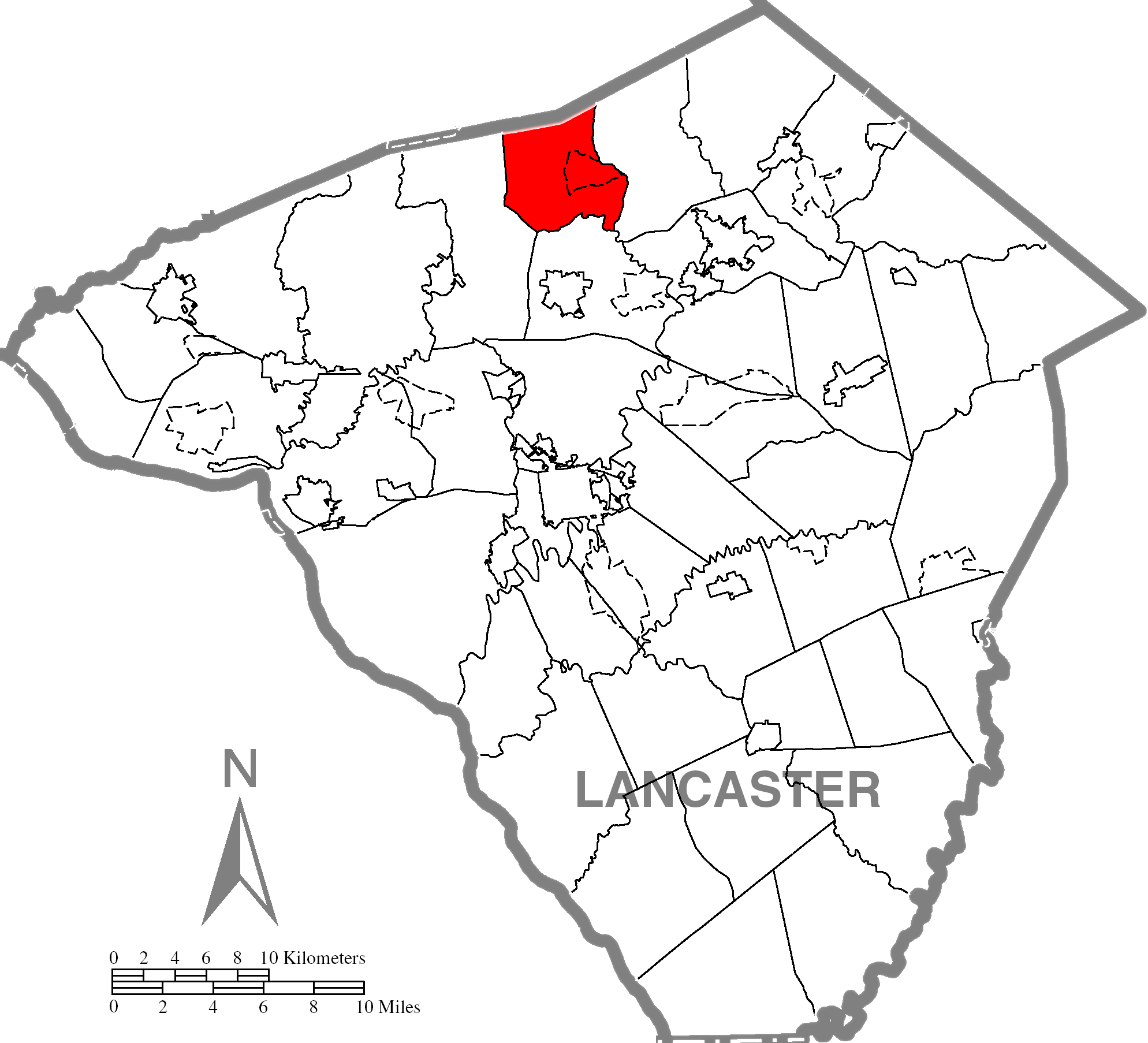
- Map of Lancaster County highlighting Elizabeth Township
- Country: United States
- State: Pennsylvania
- County: Lancaster
- Incorporated: 1757

Government
  - Type: Board of Supervisors

Area
  - Total: 17.67 sq mi (45.77 km^{2})
  - Land: 17.39 sq mi (45.04 km^{2})
  - Water: 0.28 sq mi (0.73 km^{2})

Population (2020)
  - Total: 3,998 ▲
  - Estimate (2021): 3,983
  - Density: 229.3/sq mi (88.53/km^{2})
- Time zone: UTC-5 (Eastern (EST))
  - Summer (DST): UTC-4 (EDT)
- Area code: 717
- FIPS code: 42-071-23008
- Website: elizabethtownship.net

Elizabeth Township is a township in north central Lancaster County, Pennsylvania, United States. The population was 3,998 at the 2020 census.

== Geography ==
According to the United States Census Bureau, the township has a total area of 17.8 square miles (46 km^{2}), of which 17.6 square miles (46 km^{2}) is land and 0.2 square miles (0.52 km^{2}) (1.07%) is water.

The township's largest village is Brickerville. Some other, smaller villages include: Elm, Poplar Grove, Spring Lake Park, Speedwell, and small portions of Halfville, Hopeland and Clay.

== History ==
Elizabeth Township was established in 1757 as a split off Warwick Township. It was split again in 1853 to create the present Clay Township to the east.

In early colonial days, the area now comprising Elizabeth Township played an important part in the development of the county. The village of Brickerville dates from 1741, when the area's first blast furnace was built to make cast iron from ore from the Cornwall mines. Stiegel glass manufacturing, dating from 1757, soon grew into an international export. Iron production grew, reaching its peak circa 1780 and continuing until 1856. The supplying of charcoal from area forests to feed the furnaces over this period became an important related industry.

The Hammer Creek Bridge, Stiegel-Coleman House, and Speedwell Forge are listed on the National Register of Historic Places.

== Demographics ==
Historical population
Census	Pop.	Note	%±
2000	3,833		—
2010	3,886		1.4%
2020	3,998		2.9%
2021 (est.)	3,983		−0.4%
U.S. Decennial Census

As of the census of 2000, there were 3,833 people, 1,303 households, and 1,088 families living in the township. The population density was 218.0 inhabitants per square mile (84.2/km^{2}). There were 1,334 housing units at an average density of 75.9 per square mile (29.3/km^{2}). The racial makeup of the township was 98.62% White, 0.37% African American, 0.03% Native American, 0.29% Asian, 0.37% from other races, and 0.34% from two or more races. Hispanic or Latino of any race were 1.25% of the population.

There were 1,303 households, out of which 39.1% had children under the age of 18 living with them, 76.7% were married couples living together, 4.6% had a female householder with no husband present, and 16.5% were non-families. 12.7% of all households were made up of individuals, and 4.1% had someone living alone who was 65 years of age or older. The average household size was 2.94 and the average family size was 3.24.

In the township the population was spread out, with 29.5% under the age of 18, 7.9% from 18 to 24, 29.7% from 25 to 44, 24.9% from 45 to 64, and 8.0% who were 65 years of age or older. The median age was 36 years. For every 100 females there were 108.0 males. For every 100 females age 18 and over, there were 103.7 males.

The median income for a household in the township was $50,720, and the median income for a family was $54,181. Males had a median income of $39,074 versus $26,354 for females. The per capita income for the township was $19,078. About 2.5% of families and 4.4% of the population were below the poverty line, including 5.5% of those under age 18 and none of those age 65 or over.

Wolf Sanctuary of PA
