= Cornwall Iron Furnace =

Historic district in Pennsylvania, United States

- U.S. National Register of Historic Places
- U.S. National Historic Landmark District
- Pennsylvania state historical marker
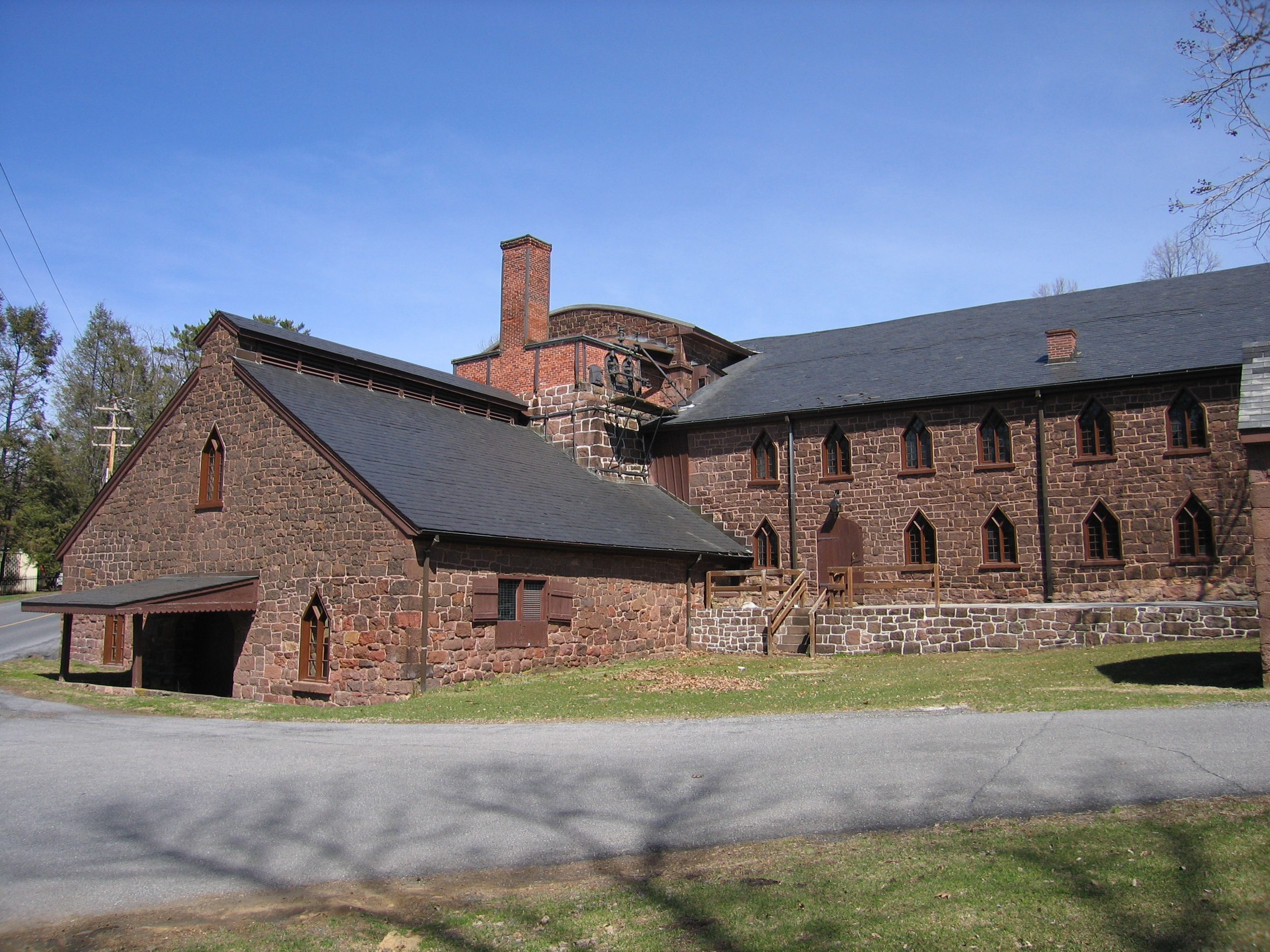
- Main building at Cornwall Iron Furnace

- Location within Pennsylvania
- Location: Rexmont Rd. and Boyd St., Cornwall, Pennsylvania
- Coordinates: 40°16′14″N 76°24′22″W
- Area: 175 acres (71 ha)
- Built: 1742; 284 years ago, shutdown 1883; 143 years ago
- Architect: Peter Grubb
- NRHP reference No.: 66000671

Significant dates
- Added to NRHP: November 13, 1966
- Designated NHLD: November 3, 1966
- Designated PHMC: August 1, 1948 and June 1, 2005

Cornwall Iron Furnace is a designated National Historic Landmark that is administered by the Pennsylvania Historical and Museum Commission in Cornwall, Lebanon County, Pennsylvania in the United States. The furnace was a leading Pennsylvania iron producer from 1742 until it was shut down in 1883. The furnaces, support buildings and surrounding community have been preserved as a historical site and museum, providing a glimpse into Lebanon County's industrial past. The site is the only intact charcoal-burning iron blast furnace in its original plantation in the Western Hemisphere. Established by Peter Grubb in 1742, Cornwall Furnace was operated during the American Revolution by his sons Curtis and Peter Jr. who were major arms providers to George Washington. Robert Coleman acquired Cornwall Furnace after the Revolution and became Pennsylvania's first millionaire. Ownership of the furnace and its surroundings was transferred to the Commonwealth of Pennsylvania in 1932.

== Overview ==
Cornwall Iron Furnace was one of many ironworks that were built in Pennsylvania over a sixty-year period, from 1716 to 1776. There were at least 21 blast furnaces, 45 forges, four bloomeries, six steel furnaces, three slitting mills, two plate mills, and one wire mill in operation in Colonial Pennsylvania.

The furnaces at Cornwall Furnace went through two stages of technology. Peter Grubb was born in Delaware about 1702 and settled in what is now Lebanon County in 1734. He bought about 300 acres (1.2 km^{2}) of land rich in magnetite. Grubb also noticed that his land had the other natural resources needed to produce iron. Namely, vast stands of timber for the production of charcoal, running water to operate the bellows, and an ample supply of limestone needed to add flux to the smelting furnaces. Grubb's plans were further helped by the fact that the magnetite at Cornwall was either very close to or on the surface of his land. He was ready to venture into the iron business and set about the task of building an iron "plantation". These centers of iron production were usually located well away from the heavily cleared farmlands and were nestled in the Ridge and Valley section of Pennsylvania. Grubb constructed his furnaces, first a bloomery and later the more modern charcoal-fired blast furnace and the support buildings and mill village that was needed to house his workers. He named his operation Cornwall because his father, John Grubb had come from Cornwall, UK in 1677. Cornwall Iron Furnace was an excellent fit for the agricultural-based economy of the Thirteen Colonies. Iron was needed to make into tools, nails and weapons. The official policy of Great Britain frowned on manufacturing in the colonies, but England was no longer able to produce the needed iron for its needs let alone the needs of the colonists. In fact England had become dependent on importing iron from Sweden.

Peter Grubb was not really an ironmaster, but a builder. In 1745 he leased the ironworks to a consortium, Cury and Company, for 25 years and returned to Wilmington. The consortium continued the operation, with ownership passing to Peter's sons, Curtis and Peter Jr., after his death in 1754. The brothers took over the operation in 1765 and ran it quite successfully until the late 1780s. Curtis operated the Cornwall Furnace and lived on site; circa 1773 he built the original 19 rooms of the mansion that still stands prominently next to the property. Peter Jr. ran a forge at Hopewell, refining the pig iron produced by the furnace into more valuable bar iron. The ironworks were major suppliers to the Revolutionary War effort, and George Washington once visited to inspect the operation. Unfortunately for the Grubb family, as described in Curtis Grubb's biography, they were unable to retain control of the operation after Curtis' marriage in 1783. Most of the Grubb's holdings gradually fell into the hands of Robert Coleman, culminating in 1798. Coleman's son, William, was named manager of Cornwall Furnace and lived in the mansion; in 1865 the Colemans remodeled it into the 29-room structure known today as Buckingham Mansion.

== Iron Act ==
In American Colonial history, the Iron Act, passed in 1750, was part of the British legislation designed to encourage the production of raw materials (including pig iron) in colonial America, but to restrict their manufacture there into finished iron goods. Existing manufacturing works could continue, but new ones for certain processes were prohibited.

== Bloomery ==
The first furnace built by Peter Grubb at Cornwall Iron Furnace was a bloomery. Grubb built this in 1737 to test the market value of his ore. It was an economical way to test the market without having to invest in building the much more efficient and profitable blast furnace.

A bloomery is basically an enlarged blacksmith's hearth. It consists of a pit or chimney with heat-resistant walls made of earth, clay, or stone. (Sandstone was used at Cornwall.) Near the bottom, one or more clay pipes enter through the side walls. These pipes, called tuyeres, allow air to enter the furnace, either by natural draft or by forced with a bellows. An opening at the bottom of the bloomery may be used to remove the bloom, or the bloomery can be tipped over and the bloom removed from the bottom.

The first step taken before the bloomery can be used is the preparation of the charcoal and the iron ore. The charcoal is produced by heating wood to produce the nearly pure carbon fuel needed for the refining process. The ore is broken into small pieces and roasted in a fire to remove any moisture in the ore. Any large impurities in the ore can be crushed and removed. Since slag from previous blooms may have a high iron content, slag from previous blooms can be broken up and recycled into the bloomery with the new ore.

In operation, the bloomery is preheated by burning charcoal, and once hot, iron ore and additional charcoal are introduced through the top, in a roughly one-to-one ratio. Inside the furnace, carbon monoxide from the incomplete combustion of the charcoal reduces the iron oxides in the ore to metallic iron, without melting the ore; this allows the bloomery to operate at lower temperatures than the melting temperature of the ore. Since the desired product of a bloomery is easily forgeable, nearly pure iron, with a low carbon content, the temperature and ratio of charcoal to iron ore must be carefully controlled to keep the iron from absorbing the carbon and becoming unforgeable. Limestone could also be added to the bloomery, about 10% of the ore weight, which would act as flux and help carry away impurities.

The small particles of iron produced in this way fall to the bottom of the furnace and become welded together to form a spongy mass of the bloom. The bottom of the furnace also fills with molten slag, often consisting of fayalite, a compound of silicon, oxygen and iron mixed with other impurities from the ore. Because the bloom is highly porous, and its open spaces are full of slag, the bloom must later be reheated and beaten with a hammer to drive the molten slag out of it. Iron treated this way is said to be wrought, and the resulting nearly pure iron wrought iron.

== Blast furnace ==
In 1742, Grubb replaced his bloomery with a 30-foot (9.1 m) high charcoal-fired cold blast furnace. The blast furnace burned hotter than the bloomery and was able to render molten pig iron ("charcoal iron") from the ore.

A blast furnace relies on the fact that the unwanted silicon and other impurities are lighter than the molten iron that is the main product. Grubb's furnace was built in the form of a tall chimney-like structure lined with refractory brick. Charcoal, limestone and iron ore (iron oxide) were poured in at the top, and air was blown in through tuyeres near the base. The resulting "blast" promotes combustion of the charcoal (more modern furnaces use coke or even anthracite), creating a chemical reaction that reduces the iron oxide to the base metal which sinks to the bottom of the furnace. The exact nature of the reaction is:

Fe_{2}O_{3} + 3 CO → 2Fe + 3CO_{2}

More precisely, the compressed air blown into the furnace reacts with the carbon in the fuel to produce carbon monoxide, which then mixes with the iron oxide, reacting chemically to produce iron and carbon dioxide, which leaks out of the furnace at the top. In the beginning of the reaction cycle, the hot blast, also called "wind", containing pre-heated gas from Cowper stoves and air, is blasted into the furnace through tuyeres. The wind will ignite the coke and the Boudouard reaction will take place:

C + O_{2} → CO_{2}
CO_{2} + C → 2 CO

The temperature in the furnace typically runs at about 1500 °C, which is enough to also decompose limestone (calcium carbonate) into calcium oxide and additional carbon dioxide:

CaCO_{3} → CaO + CO_{2}

The calcium oxide reacts with various acidic impurities in the iron (notably silica), forming a slag containing calcium silicate, CaSiO_{3} which floats on the iron.

The pig iron produced by the blast furnace is not useful for most purposes due to its high carbon content, around 4-5%, making it very brittle. Some pig iron is used to make cast iron goods, often being remelted in a foundry cupola.

For other purposes further processing is needed to reduce the carbon content to enable iron to be used for tools or as a construction material. There have been various processes for this. The earliest process was conducted in the finery forge. In the late 18th century, this began to be displaced by 'potting and stamping', but the most successful new process of the Industrial Revolution period was puddling.

This is now done by forcing a jet of high-pressure oxygen into a special rotating container containing the pig iron. Some of the carbon is oxidised into carbon monoxide, CO, and carbon dioxide, CO_{2}. This also oxidizes impurities in the pig iron. The container is rotated and the processed pig iron can be separated from the oxidised impurities. Before the mid 19th century, pig iron from the blast furnace was made into wrought iron, which is commercially pure iron. At that period, if steel was needed, particularly pure varieties of iron were heated with charcoal in a cementation furnace to produce blister steel (with about 1-2% carbon). This might be further purified using the crucible technique, but steel was too expensive to use on a large scale. However, with the introduction of the Bessemer process in the late 1850s and then other processes, the production of steel was dramatically increased. By the late 19th century most iron was being converted to steel before use.

=== Charcoal ===
The blast furnaces at Cornwall Furnace needed a tremendous amount of charcoal in order to keep them fired and thereby create a steady production of iron. The making of the charcoal became an industry in itself. Hardwood trees were chopped down, dried, stacked and fired in 30-to-40-foot-diameter (9.1 to 12.2 m) pits. A collier carefully stacked the wood around a chimney. The stack of wood was covered with leaves and dirt and was set on fire in the center. The fires were allowed to smolder for ten to fourteen days, under the careful, round the clock, supervision of the collier. The colliers were careful to make sure that enough heat was produced to expel moisture, tar and other substances from the wood without burning the wood up entirely. Wood was not charred until just before it was needed to keep it from getting wet and becoming useless. The demand for charcoal was so tremendous that Cornwall Furnace used an entire acre of wood every day for making charcoal.

=== Working at the furnace ===
The furnace operated twenty-four hours a day, seven days a week, except for when it was closed for repairs. Cornwall Iron Furnace was capable of producing 24 tons of iron a week. A large waterwheel powered the bellows. Carts loaded with charcoal passed to and fro between the coal barn and the furnace under a protective roof designed to keep the charcoal dry. Other wagons hauled the ore from the mine to the top of the furnace on the hillside. Workers then manually transported the charcoal and ore to the furnace. The guttermen worked at the base of the furnace. They raked the cooling sand and dug channels for the molten pig iron. Next, they stacked the bars of pig iron outside. The working conditions were very difficult. Temperatures inside the casting house reached as high as 160 °F (71 °C).

Such a massive and difficult iron and charcoal making operation need a massive and hardened workforce. The furnace alone needed as many as sixty people working around the clock in twelve-hour shifts. The iron works support staff included a company clerk, a host of teamsters, woodcutters, the colliers, farmers and household servants. There was a wide gap between the classes. Workers were housed in small homes and worked very hard for low wages. The owners and supervisors of the furnace lived in mansions with sizable servant staffs. Historians have likened life at the furnace to life in a feudal barony.

There were three groups of workers at Cornwall Iron Furnace: Free labor, indentured servants and slaves. Slavery was legal in Pennsylvania until it was gradually abolished beginning in 1780 when the importation of slaves was prohibited. The management of the furnace had quite a bit of trouble with the staff of indentured servants. These unskilled workers were imported from Germany, England and Ireland. Many of them worked at Cornwall for a short time before eventually running away.

== The Coleman legacy ==
=== Robert Coleman ===
Robert Coleman rose from a holding clerkship at a prothonotary's office in Philadelphia to bookkeeper at Cornwall Iron Furnace to becoming Pennsylvania's first millionaire.

Coleman arrived in Philadelphia from Ireland in 1764. After serving as a clerk and bookkeeper he went on to acquire a lease on Salford Forge near Norristown in 1773 and immediately made a sizeable profit by manufacturing cannonballs and shot at Salford and Elizabeth Furnaces. He then used his profits to purchase a two thirds share of Elizabeth Furnace, shares of Cornwall and the Upper and Lower Hopewell Furnaces, (not the similarly named Hopewell Furnace), and ownership of Speedwell Forge. Soon Coleman was able to construct Colebrook Furnace, purchase the rest of Elizabeth Furnace and acquired 80% ownership of Cornwall Furnace and the ore mines nearby. His business acquisitions and the profits turned from them enabled him to become the first millionaire in the history of Pennsylvania.

=== George Dawson Coleman ===
George Dawson Coleman was the grandson of Robert Coleman and son of James Coleman. George Dawson Coleman married Deborah Brown of Philadelphia and had several children including Ann Coleman who moved to France and revitalized Château de Villandry (alongside her husband Joachim Carvallo).

George Dawson Coleman controlled much of the Coleman iron fortune with his brother, Robert. George acquired greater control of the ore mines at Cornwall and was able to experiment with iron furnaces that were fueled by anthracite coal instead of coke. He also invested in the expanding railroad, and built houses, a school and church for his employees. He was much loved by his community and went on to serve several times in the Pennsylvania State Legislature. (Several churches built by the Coleman family are still in existence in the area, and they are known as Coleman Chapels.)

George oversaw many improvements in production at Cornwall Iron Furnace. The bellows were replaced with "blowing tubs." The blowing tubs were piston-powered air pumps and containers that held compressed air and forced that air into the furnaces. The waterwheel was replaced by a steam engine in 1841. And the furnace stack was rebuilt in the 1850s.

The Colemans turned direct supervision of Cornwall Iron Furnace to John Reynolds in 1848, who acted as the guardian of the minor children of Thomas B. Coleman. He was the father of John F. Reynolds, a graduate of West Point. John Fulton Reynolds was commissioned a general and was the first Union General to fall at the Battle of Gettysburg. The elder Reynolds managed the furnace until his death in 1853.

=== Robert Habersham Coleman ===
Robert Habersham Coleman was the fourth and last generation scion of the Colemans. He shut the facility in 1883, opening new facilities for the company. In 1881, at the time he took over his family's business, Coleman was worth about seven million dollars. By 1889 he was estimated to be worth thirty million dollars. By 1893 the fortune had vanished. One of his homes, Cornwall Hall, was a "symbol of the rise, fame and decline of the "king" of Cornwall (Pennsylvania) during America's Gilded Age."

== Downfall ==
Cornwall Iron Furnace became obsolete by the 1880s. The Bessemer and open-hearth processes of creating steel, the replacement of charcoal with coke and anthracite coal, the discovery of iron deposits at the Iron Range in Minnesota near Lake Superior, and the building of modern factories in Pittsburgh, Steelton and Bethlehem brought about the end of iron production in Cornwall. Cornwall Furnace no longer earned a profit in its last ten years of operation and the last owner, Robert Habersham Coleman, had it shut down on February 11, 1883. In 1932, the furnace and ancillary buildings were deeded by Margaret Coleman Buckingham and have since been restored and open to the public.

== See also ==
- Cast Iron
- Iron
- Ironworks
- Ewiger Jäger— Cornwall Iron Furnace is the site of a ghostly legend of the Wild Hunt.
- List of National Historic Landmarks in Pennsylvania
- National Register of Historic Places listings in Lebanon County, Pennsylvania
