= Clay, Pennsylvania =

Unincorporated community in Pennsylvania, US

- Census-designated place
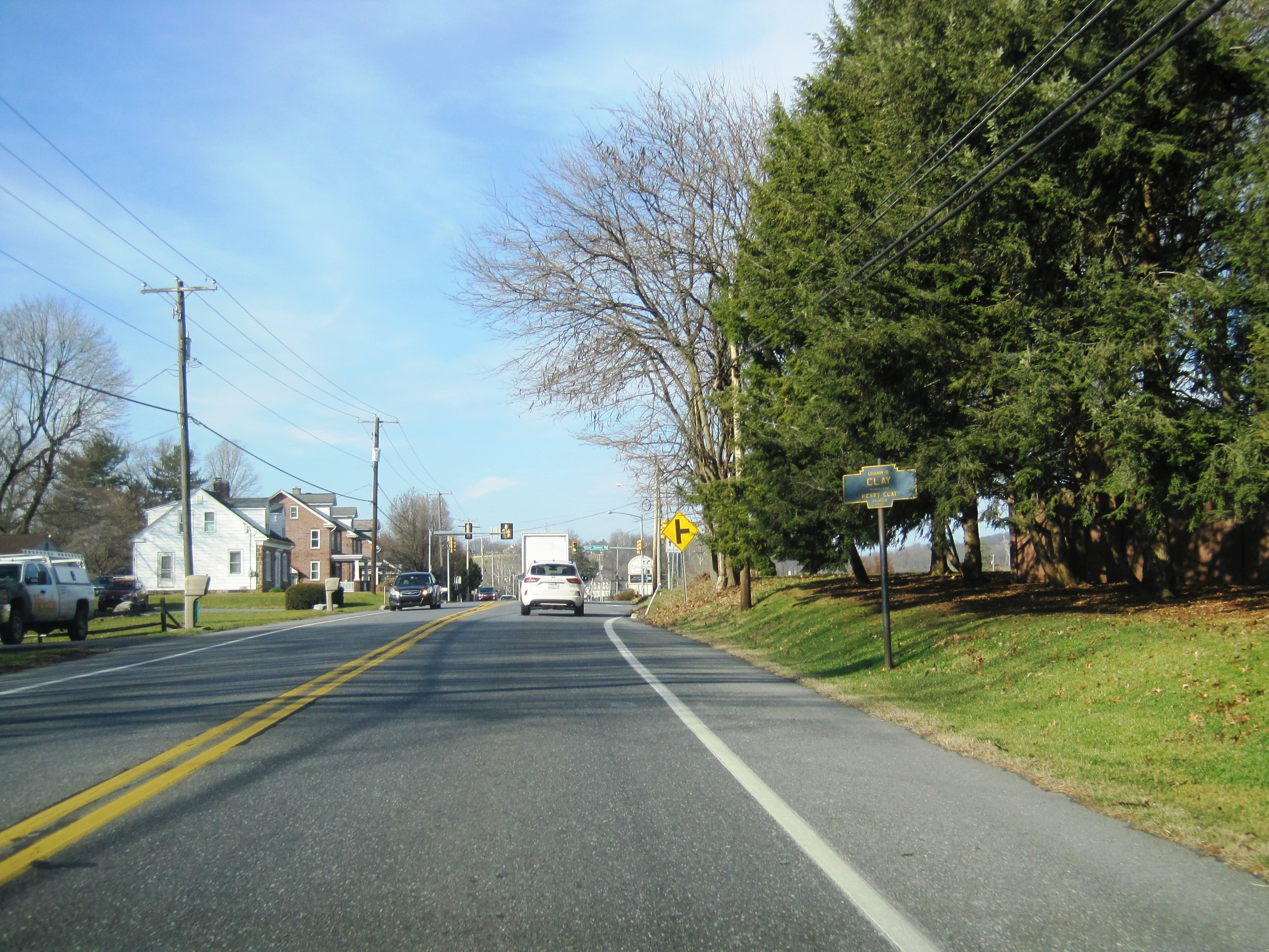
- Keystone Marker along westbound US 322 entering Clay

- Location within Pennsylvania Location within the United States
- Coordinates: 40°13′6″N 76°15′9″W
- Country: United States
- State: Pennsylvania
- County: Lancaster
- Township: Clay

Area
  - Total: 2.25 sq mi (5.82 km^{2})
  - Land: 2.24 sq mi (5.79 km^{2})
  - Water: 0.012 sq mi (0.03 km^{2})
- Elevation: 359 ft (109 m)

Population (2020)
  - Total: 1,869
  - Density: 835.9/sq mi (322.73/km^{2})
- Time zone: UTC-5 (Eastern (EST))
  - Summer (DST): UTC-4 (EDT)
- ZIP code: 17522 (Ephrata)
- Area code: 717
- FIPS code: 42-13952
- GNIS feature ID: 1171942

Clay is an unincorporated community and census-designated place (CDP) in Clay Township, Lancaster County, Pennsylvania, United States. It is located along U.S. Route 322 between Brickerville and Ephrata. As of the 2010 census, the population was 1,559.

== Geography ==
Clay is in northern Lancaster County, in the southern part of Clay Township. Clay is bordered by Hopeland to the west and northwest. US 322 leads northwest 12 miles (19 km) to Quentin and southeast 5 miles (8 km) to Ephrata. It is 14 miles (23 km) north of Lancaster, the county seat.

According to the U.S. Census Bureau, the Clay CDP has a total area of 2.2 square miles (5.8 km^{2}), of which 0.01 square miles (0.03 km^{2}), or 0.49%, are water. Middle Creek, which forms the border between Clay Township and Elizabeth Township, runs through the west side of the community, flowing southeast towards Cocalico Creek, a tributary of the Conestoga River and part of the Susquehanna River watershed.

== Demographics ==
Historical population
| Census | Pop. | Note | %± |
|---|---|---|---|
| 2020 | 1,869 | | — |
U.S. Decennial Census
