= Hopeland =

Hopeland can mean:

== Australia ==
- Hopeland, Queensland, a locality in the Western Downs Region
- Hopeland, Western Australia, a suburb of Perth

== United States ==
- Hopeland, Pennsylvania
