= Hammer Creek Bridge =

Hammer Creek Bridge may refer to the following bridges on the National Register of Historic Places in Lancaster County, Pennsylvania:

- Erb's Covered Bridge on Erbs Bridge Road
- Brunnerville Road Bridge over Hammer Creek
