= Hopeland, Pennsylvania =

Unincorporated community in Pennsylvania, US

- Census-designated place
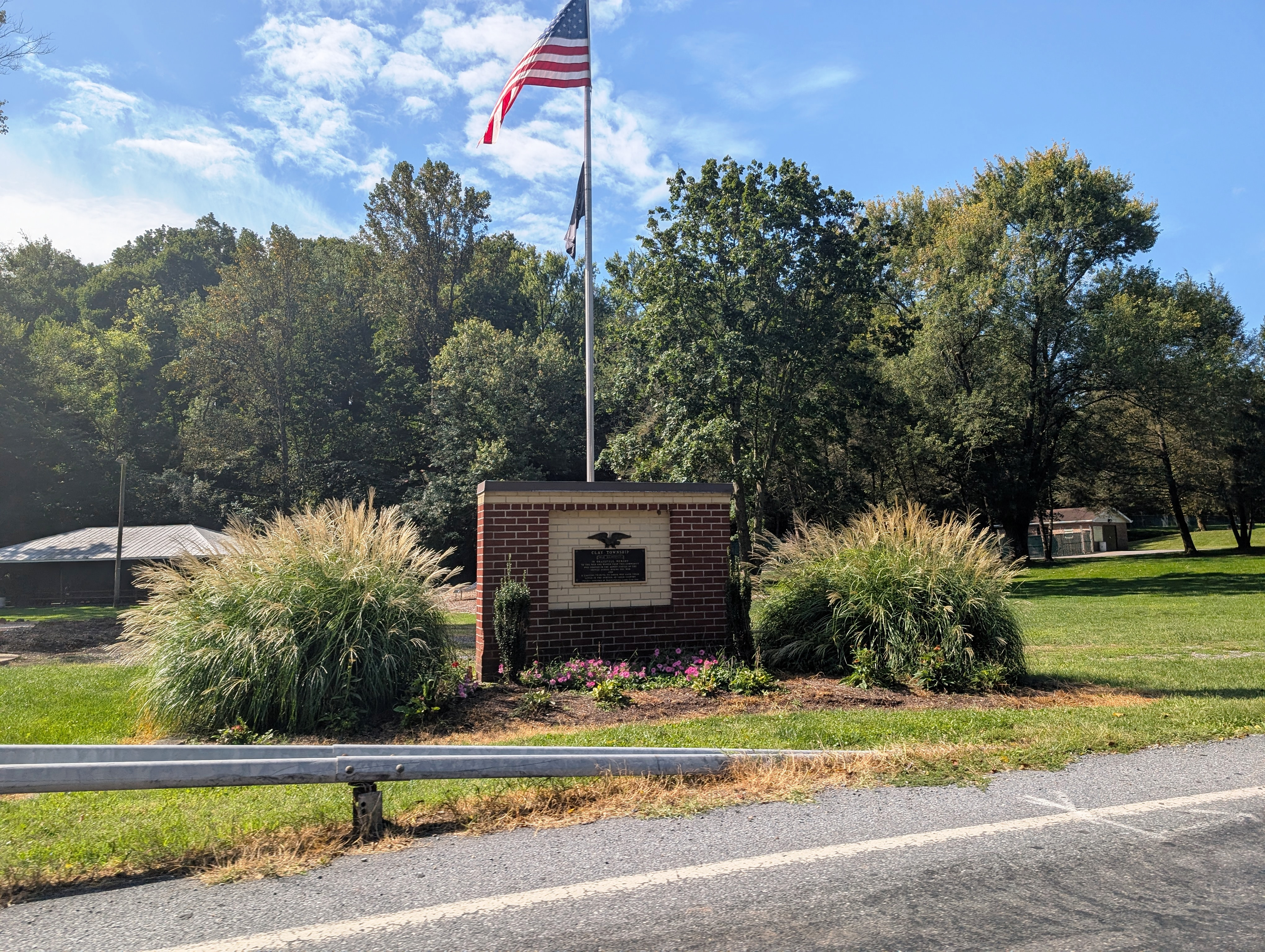
- Clay Township veterans memorial in Hopeland

- Location in Pennsylvania Location in the United States
- Coordinates: 40°14′01″N 76°15′44″W
- Country: United States
- State: Pennsylvania
- County: Lancaster
- Townships: Clay, Elizabeth

Area
  - Total: 0.67 sq mi (1.73 km^{2})
  - Land: 0.66 sq mi (1.71 km^{2})
  - Water: 0.012 sq mi (0.03 km^{2})
- Elevation: 400 ft (120 m)

Population (2020)
  - Total: 641
  - Density: 971.9/sq mi (375.25/km^{2})
- Time zone: UTC-5 (Eastern (EST))
  - Summer (DST): UTC-4 (EDT)
- ZIP code: 17533
- FIPS code: 42-35632
- GNIS feature ID: 1177388

Hopeland is a small unincorporated hamlet and census-designated place (CDP) that is located in Lancaster County in the south of the U.S. state of Pennsylvania in the United States. The hamlet's ZIP code is 17533.

As of the 2010 census the population was 738.

== Geography ==
According to the U.S. Census Bureau, the Hopeland CDP has a total area of 0.67 square miles (1.74 km^{2}), of which 0.01 square miles (0.03 km^{2}), or 1.56%, are water. The community is drained by Middle Creek and its tributary Furnace Run, flowing south to Cocalico Creek and part of the Conestoga River watershed leading to the Susquehanna River.

The community is in northern Lancaster County, in western Clay Township. A small portion extends south into Elizabeth Township. It is bordered to the southwest by Brickerville and to the southeast by Clay, both unincorporated. U.S. Route 322 (28th Division Highway) passes through the south end of the community, leading northwest 12 miles (19 km) to Quentin and southeast 5 miles (8 km) to Ephrata. Lititz is 7 miles (11 km) to the southwest. Interstate 76, the Pennsylvania Turnpike, forms the northern edge of Hopeland, with the closest access being Exit 266 to the west or Exit 286 to the east, both 11 miles (18 km) away.

== Demographics ==
Historical population
Census	Pop.	Note	%±
2020	641		—
U.S. Decennial Census
