= Speedwell Forge =

- Speedwell Forge Mansion
- U.S. National Register of Historic Places
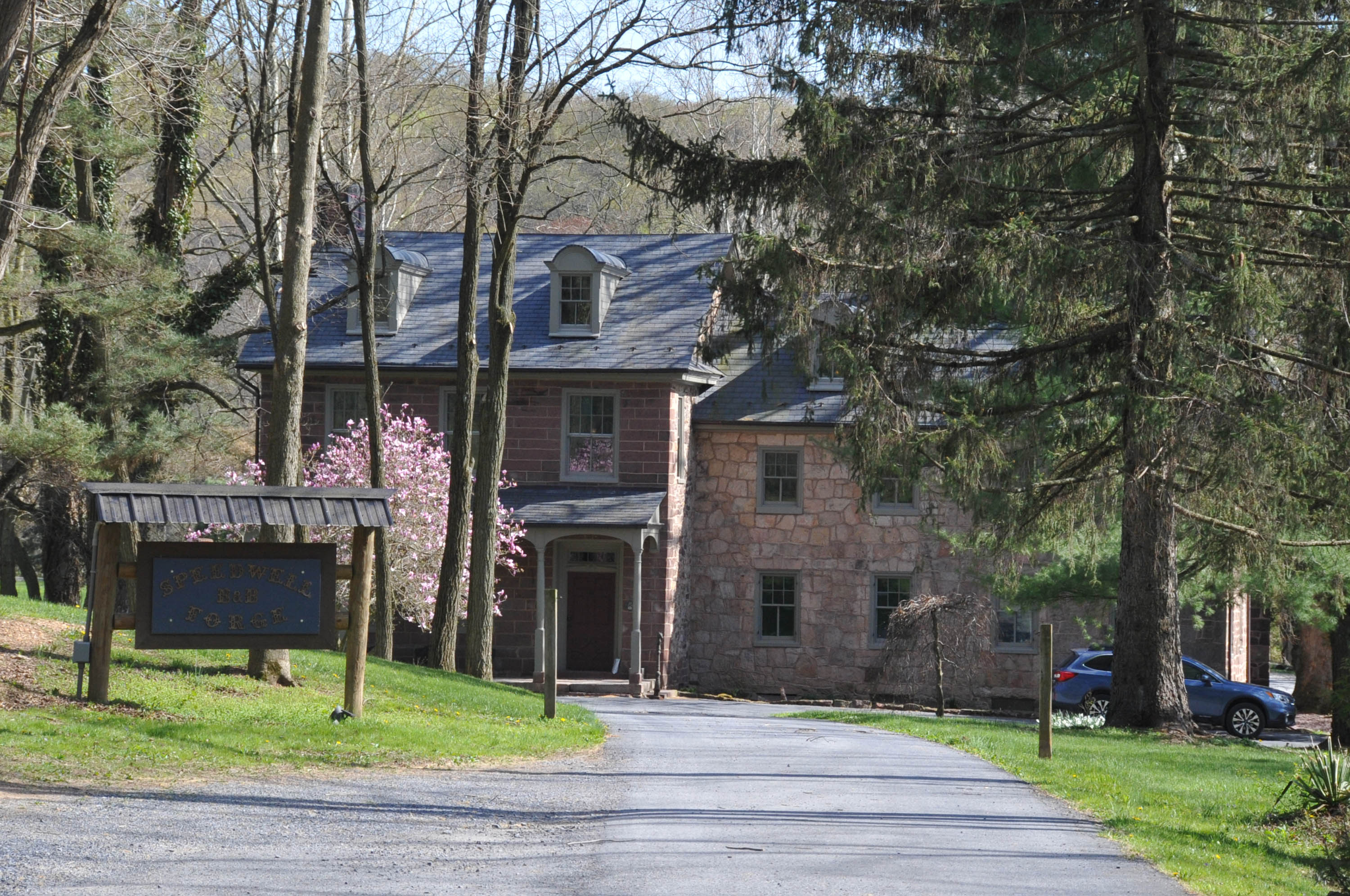

- Location within Pennsylvania Location within the United States
- Interactive map showing the location of Speedwell Forge
- Location: 465 Speedwell Forge Rd., Elizabeth Township, Pennsylvania
- Coordinates: 40°12′56″N 76°19′52″W
- Area: less than one acre
- Architectural style: Georgian, Federal
- NRHP reference No.: 06000429
- Added to NRHP: May 24, 2006

Speedwell Forge Mansion, also known as Speedwell Forge Homestead, is a historic home located at Elizabeth Township, Lancaster County, Pennsylvania. The ironmaster's mansion was built about 1760, and is a 2½-story, four bay wide and two bay deep, brownstone and fieldstone dwelling in the Georgian style. It was expanded about 1795 with a Georgian/Federal style wing. Also on the property are a contributing stone summer kitchen (c. 1760), stone and frame workshop (c. 1795-c. 1850), stone paymaster's office c. 1795), and stone privy (c. 1795).

The forge operated continuously until 1854, when it closed as iron production moved west. The property has been restored and turned into a bed and breakfast as well as the Wolf Sanctuary of Pennsylvania. It was listed on the National Register of Historic Places in 2006.

== Ironmasters ==
=== Peter Grubb ===
Peter Grubb founded the Cornwall Iron Furnace as well as the Cornwall iron mines, the richest source of iron ever found in America east of Lake Superior.

In the 1730s, Grubb, a stonemason, began mining in what is now known as Cornwall, Pennsylvania, and literally stumbled upon one of the largest and richest iron mines ever found. (It was mined for over 240 years, until the open pit mine flooded in 1972). In 1742, Grubb built the Cornwall Iron Furnace which used a charcoal-fired blast furnace to convert iron ore to pig iron.

Peter Grubb's sons, Curtis and Peter Jr., operated the ironworks after 1765 and Peter Jr., who ran the Hopewell Forges on Hammer Creek, hired Robert Coleman.

=== John Jacob Huber ===
Around 1735, John Jacob Huber, a German immigrant, set up a tavern on Newport Road, which ran from Lancaster, Pennsylvania to the port at Newport, Delaware. (This tavern is now the Forgotten Seasons B&B.) In 1746 he sold the tavern and purchased 400 acres (1.6 km^{2}) of land in what is now Elizabeth County. By 1750 he built Elizabeth Furnace and began casting five-plate stoves, some of which survive today.

=== Henry William Stiegel ===
Huber hired another German immigrant, Henry William Stiegel, as clerk, and in 1752 Stiegel married Huber's daughter, Elizabeth. In 1757, Stiegel purchased his father-in-law's interest in the furnace. (The township later took its name from the furnace.)

=== James Old ===
James Old (1730-1809) emigrated from Wales in 1750. Arriving in Lancaster, he was employed at Windsor Forge in Caernarvon Township. A few years later, he struck out on his own and built Poole Forge, also in Caernarvon Township. In 1760, he and his partner David Caldwell purchased land from Huber along Hammer Creek, and built Speedwell Forge.

=== Robert Coleman ===
Robert Coleman (1748–1825) was born in Caste Finn, Ireland, and immigrated to Pennsylvania in 1764. Arriving penniless, his beautiful penmanship soon earned him a clerk position for the Reading Prothonotary. After two years, he was hired by Peter Grubb Jr. as a clerk at Hopewell Forge, in Lancaster County. However, in 1767, after only six months at Hopewell Forge, Coleman was hired by James Old, who had just leased Quittapahilla Forge in Lancaster County (now Lebanon County). Coleman lived with the Old family, travelling between Speedwell and Quittapahilla.

Because of its distance from town, a forge had to be self-sustaining, employing farmers, lumberjacks, blacksmiths, horses, livestock, etc. Thus the iron master oversaw not just a forge, but a community.

In 1767, Old took Coleman to Reading Furnace, in Chester County, Pennsylvania. In 1773, Coleman married Old's daughter, Anne. With the help of his father-in-law, Coleman leased Salford Forge, and began building his iron empire. In 1784, Coleman purchased Speedwell Forge from his father-in-law for 7000 pounds. After selling Speedwell, James Old purchased an interest in Hopewell Furnace in Berks County, Pennsylvania. There are indicators that he worked as a Justice of the Courts in Lancaster, and was a member of the State Assembly.

Coleman owned several furnaces during the Revolution, receiving many contracts for munitions and chain links, which were stretched across the bays to keep English war ships at bay. Coleman reinvested his profits, buying many forges and furnaces, even the Cornwall iron mine. He became Pennsylvania's first millionaire, and by the time of his death, his legacy was fully established.

Speedwell Forge was used as a training ground for his sons, before being promoted to furnaces.

== Use of anthracite coal ==
By the 1850s, improvements in coal technology had produced anthracite coal, which burned hotter than bituminous coal. New furnaces burned hotter and were much more efficient, and the industry was moving west to places like Pittsburgh. As a result, many of the furnaces and forges closed. Speedwell closed in 1854; Cornwall held out until 1883. Some of the furnaces (including Cornwall and Hopewell) survived, simply because the furnaces were too massive to do anything with. Forges, on the other hand, could be completely dismantled and abandoned. As a result, there are no extant forges remaining in America.

== Horse breeding ==
The Speedwell property remained in the Coleman family, and they began breeding standardbred horses for sulky racing. The quarter-mile training track is now used as the driveway for Speedwell Forge mansion, and the half-mile racing track is still visible at the top of the hill, in what is now a cornfield.

== Lake and county park ==
In 1942, Margaret Coleman Buckingham sold the Speedwell property, and surrounding 1,000 acres (4.0 km^{2}), to Gerald and Kathryn Darlington. In the 1960s, Pennsylvania state purchased about 500 acres (2.0 km^{2}) along Hammer Creek and dammed it, creating Speedwell Forge Lake. In the 1990s, Lancaster County purchased about 300 acres (1.2 km^{2}) also along Hammer Creek, and created the Speedwell Forge County Park.

== The site today ==
Today, nothing remains of the forge above ground. There are supposedly some historic artifacts underwater, but the exact location of the forge is no longer known. The associated ironmaster's mansion was fully restored in 2005 by Dawn Darlington, granddaughter of Gerald and Kathryn Darlington, and converted into a bed and breakfast. In 2006, the property, which included a summer kitchen and paymaster's office, was listed on the National Register of Historic Places.

== See also ==
- List of Registered Historic Places in Lancaster County, Pennsylvania
- Speedwell Ironworks
