= Elm, Pennsylvania =

Unincorporated community in Pennsylvania, US

- Unincorporated community
- Location within Pennsylvania Location within the United States
- Coordinates: 40°12′14″N 76°20′56″W
- Country: United States
- State: Pennsylvania
- County: Lancaster
- Townships: Penn, Elizabeth
- Elevation: 604 ft (184 m)
- Time zone: UTC-5 (Eastern (EST))
  - Summer (DST): UTC-4 (EDT)
- ZIP code: 17521
- Area code: 717
- GNIS feature ID: 1174167

Elm is an unincorporated community in Elizabeth Township, Lancaster County, Pennsylvania, United States. The community is located in the Lancaster metropolitan area and is in the Eastern Standard time zone.

The community is located at 40.203°N, -76.349°W, with a mean elevation of 604 feet.
