= Ewiger Jäger =

Ghostly wild huntsman from German, Belgian and U.S. folklore

The ewiger Jäger (eternal hunter; der ewige Jäger; German: [ˈeːvɪɡɐ ˈjɛːɡɐ, deːɐ̯ ˈeːvɪɡə ˈjɛːɡɐ]) is a local variant of the ghostly wild huntsman (German wilder Jäger; German: [ˈvɪldɐ ˈjɛːɡɐ]) found in German, Belgian, and American folklore.

== Germany ==
According to the Brothers Grimm’s Deutsche Sagen (German folktales), Count Eberhard of Württemberg encountered the ewiger Jäger while hunting in the woods. After hearing a loud swooshing and other noise like that made by a huntsman, Count Eberhard dismounted his steed and asked the ghost whether it wanted to harm him. The ghostly hunter said no and told the count that he was a human like him and was formerly a lord. When the ghost was a lord, he found such pleasure in hunting that he begged God to let him hunt until Judgement Day. His wish was answered, much to his chagrin, and ever since, the ewiger Jäger had to chase the same deer for five and a half centuries before meeting Count Eberhard. He also told the count that his house and nobility were still undisclosed. On hearing this, Count Eberhard asked the huntsman to show his face so he could identify him. The revealed face was hardly as big as a fist, withered like a turnip and wrinkled like a mushroom. After that, the ghostly huntsman continued chasing his deer, and the count returned to his land.

Ludwig Bechstein told the same legend and gave additional detail. According to him, the ewiger Jäger appears as a gnarled little man dressed in green. In Swabia, where the meeting with the Count of Württemberg took place, this ghost is also known as Weltsjäger or rather in Swabian diminutive as Weltschjägerle (both: (little) world hunter) since he has to chase and run around the whole world. He was punished with eternal hunt for going for a hunt on a Sunday, breaking Sunday rest. After this encounter, the count was horror-stricken and never again went hunting.

Other Swabian variants of the eternal hunter mentioned by Bechstein are the following:

The eternal hunter appears with a hammer in hand, meant to thin out woods. With it he hits the trees which causes a curious high sound.

The eternal hunter is a Freischütz who, to obtain never-failing magic bullets, shot into the sun in the Devil's name at Christmas Eve and Good Friday. As punishment for his sacrilege he is damned to hunt eternally at night. He can be heard chasing along accompanied by his dogs.

Another Freischütz called Neck (as Bechstein mentions, usually the name of a water sprite) had fun shooting poachers to death. One Sunday, he shot five poachers at once. The dying men cursed him to eternal life. One of the poachers, who also had magic bullets, shot the Freischütz straight through his heart. Ever since he rides through the woods with a stag as his mount. He is accompanied by little white dogs whom he edges on by shouting "Hu dock dock dock! Hu dock dock dock!"

Other names for the eternal hunter are Ruprecht, Hans, and Riesenjäger. The latter term means "giant hunter", given his gigantic stature.

The eternal hunter also gets identified with the wandering Jew in Swabia since both have to run around the whole world. The German name of the wandering Jew is ewiger Jude, i.e. "eternal Jew".

== Belgium ==
Bechstein also told a legend from Belgium about the eternal hunter. Near Wijnendale Castle in Flanders, there dwelled a pious and hardworking farmer who had an only son. This son did not care for home and fields and preferred to hunt in the woods, not caring for his father's pleas and threats. When the old father lay on his deathbed, he sent for his son to say farewell and warn him. The son, hearing his dying father's request, decided to take his gun, whistle for his hounds, and go into the woods instead. Hearing about this, the old man raised his hands in desperation, cursing his son just before death: "So go hunting, hunting, hunting for all eternity—for all eternity”.

Afterward, the cursed son never returned home and was heard in the woods shouting "Jakko! Jakko! Jakko!", screeching like a bird of prey or barking like a dog, doomed to continue until Judgement Day or longer. He haunted the woods around Wijnendale until they were cut down and then retreated to still-forested heights.

== United States ==
In the United States, the ewiger Jäger was introduced by German immigrants in Pennsylvania who later were called Pennsylvania Dutch. There are a variety of spellings in Pennsylvania Dutch dialect, all of which mean "(the) eternal hunter": (Der) Ewich Yaeger, Ewichyeager, (der) Eewich Yeager, der Ewige Jaeger, Ewicher Yeeger, (Dar) Ewich Jaejer, Avich Yeager, and (Der) Aivich Yaeger.

The Canada goose is called Awicher Yager (i.e., eternal hunter) because of its sounds: a flock traveling at night can sound like a pack of dogs baying in the sky. In Pine Grove, a sound of baying dogs in the sky is associated with flocks of loons.

=== General legends ===
In Pine Grove, Blue Mountain is believed to be haunted by Dar Ewich Jaejer or Ewige Jaeger. When a phantom pack of hounds is heard on a quiet night in the fall hunting season, people look to the sky and say that the eternal hunter is riding. He is said to have been a fox hunter who cursed and swore an oath to catch a certain fox, even if he had to chase it into eternity. Thus, he continues chasing the fox with his barking dogs long after his death, returning from the other world to Blue Mountain about thirty times a year. He is doomed to chase the fox without ever catching it.

In Tremont township, Der Aivich Yaeger is said to glide through the skies at certain times, particularly in autumn. He appears as a man dressed in hunters’ attire and can be heard blowing his hunter’s horn to his dogs.

In Oley Township, the Ewichyeager is known. He is said to hunt on the hills surrounding Oley Valley and is sometimes thought to be someone from the Keim family line of Pennsylvania Dutch who, because of his fondness for hunting, decided to use Native American magic and Braucherei to hunt eternally.

The eternal hunter is said to hunt on South Mountain at night, where he can be heard calling for his pack of dogs. Those encountering him at night will either be torn to bits by his dogs or spirited away, never to be seen again. The dogs are said to be strange black animals with white teeth. They will not attack if they are blinded by lantern light.

=== Drought legends ===
In Blue Mountain (Pennsylvania German Blobarrick), the Ewicher Yeeger became known when, after the foundation of Lynn Township in 1732, in the area called Allemaengel (all deficiencies) by Pennsylvania German settlers, there was a severe drought accompanied by crop failure and the disappearance of all game animals. Autumn had arrived, and the desperately praying settlers faced starvation and illness, when one night a booming voice and barking hounds were heard from nowhere and everywhere at once. The frightened settlers left their homes at dawn to find that all kinds of game animals had returned. Starvation was warded off because hunting was possible again. The barking and howling pack of Ewicher Yeeger can be heard while the wild huntsman assures people that Blue Mountain remains bountiful.

In Schuylkill County, there is a similar tale about a drought accompanied by crop failure and lack of game animals. One settler, a single man without wife or children, decided to take his pack of hunting dogs and his gun, setting out to find meat to feed everyone, vowing not to return until he gathered enough for the whole village to survive winter. He did not return. Even after death, Der Ewich Yaeger is bound to his vow. On cold October nights in the woods, a pack of dogs can be heard baying, and the huntsman can be seen hunting in the mountains.

Another variant from Blue Mountain says that streams dried out after a long, dry summer in a drought, and game animals went missing. An old man decided to take his dogs and chase deer back, vowing to do so eternally, even through the sky, if necessary, to save his village. A few days later, deer returned, but the hunter never did. He still travels through the air as the Avich Yeager, accompanied by barking hounds, driving away all deer he encounters, as occurred in Paradise Valley in August 1949.

The Ewich Yaeger is also said to have set out to return deer and rabbits to Pine Grove and hunted through the sky ever after. He can be heard on autumn nights when barking and shotgun fire sound in the sky.

=== Furnace legends ===
In Lebanon County, der Eewich Yeager is associated with the Cornwall Iron Furnace, and his story is told by George Henry Boker in the poem "The Legend of the Hounds". Der Eewich Yeager is said to have been the cruel ironmaster of the furnace in life.

The ironmaster loved whiskey, women, and the fox hunt, but he treated his workers, mistresses, and hounds with violence, discarding them at a whim. The only exception to this was the leader of the pack of hounds and the ironmaster's constant companion—Flora, according to the poem. This hound was also mistreated but largely spared because she was unmatched in chasing prey, and she once saved her drunken master's life on a snowy winter night.

This special treatment changed, however, when the ironmaster invited influential guests for hunting, but his pack of hounds had no success. Infuriated, he rode over his dogs and whipped them, not even sparing Flora. Then he drove all forty hounds into the burning furnace, sparing only Flora. When Flora started growling, roaring, and baring her fangs at her master, he became irate. When she was peaceful again, he threw her into the furnace, where she cried, "God, God, God!”

After coming to his senses, the ironmaster was overcome with grief at the loss of Flora. He sat on his bed all day, drinking and slowly wasting away. One evening, his burning hounds returned from the furnace, led by Flora; they chased him around his home until he dropped dead, achieving their revenge.

Another version says that the pack leader was Singing Ann; the ironmaster's guests were friends from Philadelphia; and the ironmaster repented on his deathbed in March 1790, calling for Singing Ann's return. Ever since, he is said to travel the night skies as der Ewige Jaeger. Supposedly, the barking and yelping of hounds, stomping of horses' hooves, and ironmaster's muffled commands can still be heard from the sky.

== Literature ==
- Charles J. Adams III: Pennsylvania Dutch Country Ghosts Legends and Lore. Exeter House Books, Reading 1994, ISBN 978-1-49304-392-7.
- Ludwig Bechstein: Deutsches Sagenbuch. Meiningen 1852. (reprint: F. W. Hendel Verlag, Meersburg/Leipzig 1930.)
- Dennis Boyer: Once Upon a Hex: A Spiritual Ecology of the Pennsylvania Germans. Badger Books Inc., Oregon 2004, ISBN 978-1-93254-209-7.
- Wilhelm Grimm, Jacob Grimm: Deutsche Sagen: Vollständige Ausgabe mit Illustrationen von Otto Ubbellohde. Kassel 1818. (reprint: Nikol, Hamburg 2014, ISBN 978-3-86820-245-8)
- Audrey Burie Kirchner, Margaret R. Tassia: In Days Gone By: Folklore and Traditions of the Pennsylvania Dutch. Libraries Unlimited, Inc., Englewood 1996, ISBN 978-1-56308-381-5.
- George Korson, Stanley Mossman: Black Rock: Mining Folklore of the Pennsylvania Dutch. Baltimore 1960. (reprint: Literary Licensing, Whitefish 2011, ISBN 978-1-25812-661-2)
- Mark Nesbitt, Patty A. Wilson: The Big Book of Pennsylvania Ghost Stories. Globe Pequot, Lanham 2019, ISBN 978-1-49304-392-7.
- Robert Schreiwer: Ewicher Yeeger. In: Hunter M. Yoder: Der Volksfreund: Hex Signs, Folktales and Witchcraft of the Pennsylvania Dutch. Philadelphia 2019, ISBN 978-1-09084-004-2.
