= Château de Villandry =

French Renaissance castle in the Loire Valley

- Château de Villandry (French)
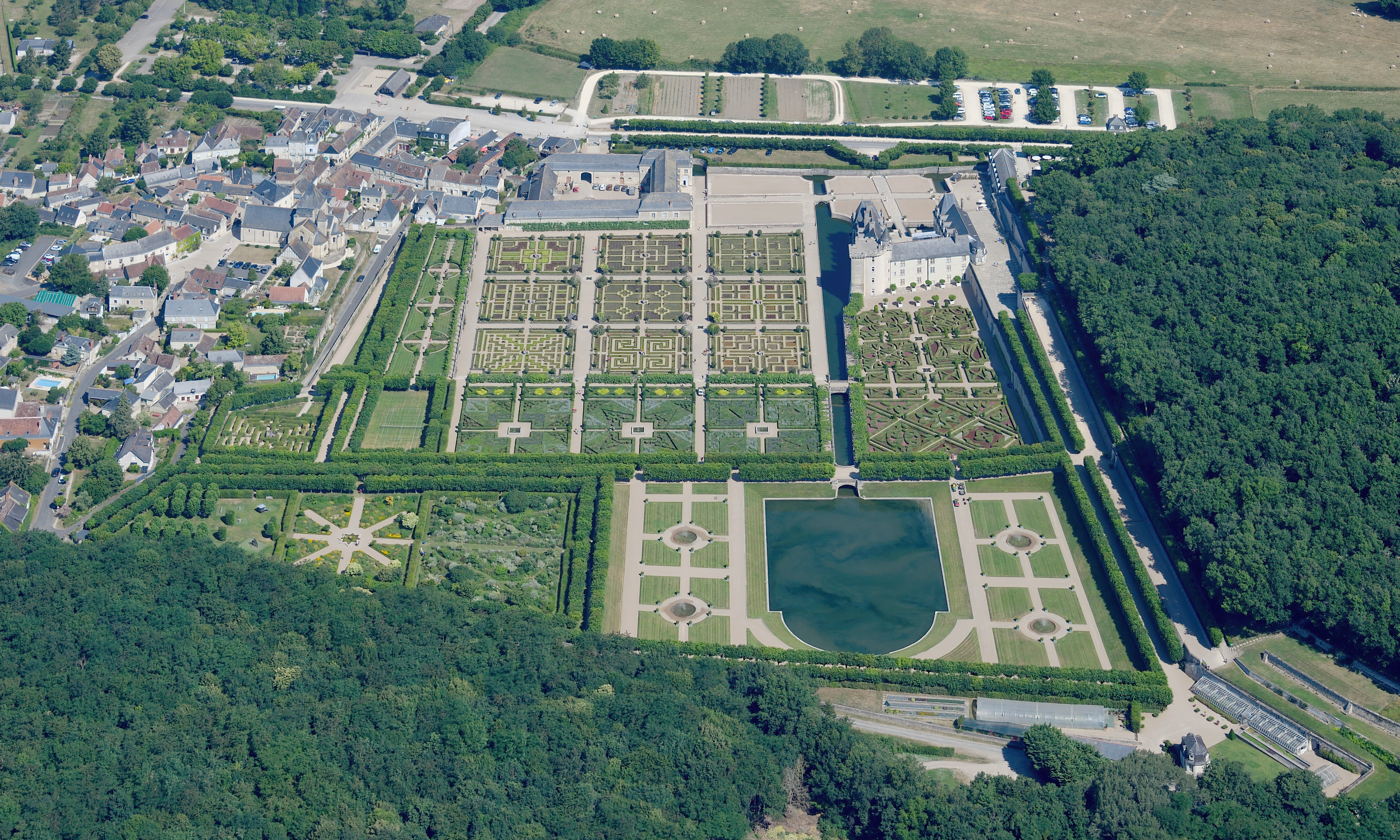
- Aerial view of Château de Villandry and its gardens

- Location within Centre-Val de Loire
- 47°20′26″N 0°30′46″E
- Location: Villandry, Indre-et-Loire, France

History
- Built: 1536

Site notes
- Website: chateauvillandry.com

UNESCO World Heritage Site
- Designated: 2000

Monument historique
- Designated: 1934

The Château de Villandry is a grand country house located in Villandry, in the département of Indre-et-Loire, France. It is especially known for its beautiful gardens.

== History ==
The lands where an ancient fortress once stood were known as Columbine until the 17th century. They were acquired in the early 16th century by Jean Le Breton, France's Controller-General for War under King Francis I, and a new château was constructed around the original 14th-century keep where King Philip II of France once met Richard I of England to discuss peace.

The château remained in the Le Breton family for more than two centuries until it was acquired by the Marquis de Castellane. During the French Revolution the property was confiscated and in the early 19th century, Emperor Napoleon acquired it for his brother Jérôme Bonaparte.

In 1906, Joachim Carvallo purchased the property, financed by his wife Ann Coleman, who was an heiress to the Coleman fortune. Extensive time, money, and devotion were then poured into repairing it and creating extraordinary gardens. Its famous Renaissance gardens include a water garden, ornamental flower gardens, and vegetable gardens. The gardens are laid out in formal patterns created with low box hedges. In 1934, Château de Villandry was designated a Monument historique. Like all the other châteaux of the Loire Valley, it is a World Heritage Site.

== Gardens ==
The ornamental kitchen garden, seen from above

Between 1908 and 1918, Joachim Carvallo devoted himself to recreating the Renaissance gardens of Villandry. He compared the remains of walls and pipes with old plans, and drew on the Monasticon Gallicanum for an idea of Renaissance landscaping. He recreated the decorative kitchen garden, and called on the painter Lozano to lay out the ornamental salons on their original terraces; the salon of music was designed by Carvallo himself. For the water garden, he used the plans of the Marquis de Castellane preserved in the Napoleonic land register. The sun garden, based on a design by Joachim Carvallo, was inaugurated in 2008. Far from being a mere replica of the gardens shown in architectural treatises, the gardens of Villandry are described by the château as a reinvention.

The mirror pool of the water garden, with the château in the distance

Since 2009, the gardens have been maintained organically. All pesticides have been eliminated and replaced by parasitic or predatory beneficial organisms or by nematodes, chemical fertilisation has been abandoned, and glyphosate is no longer used. Four beehives were installed on the south terraces of the gardens in spring 2010.

== Recent times ==
Still owned by the Carvallo family, the Château de Villandry is open to the public and is one of the most visited châteaux in France; in 2007 the château received about 330,000 visitors.

== Gallery ==
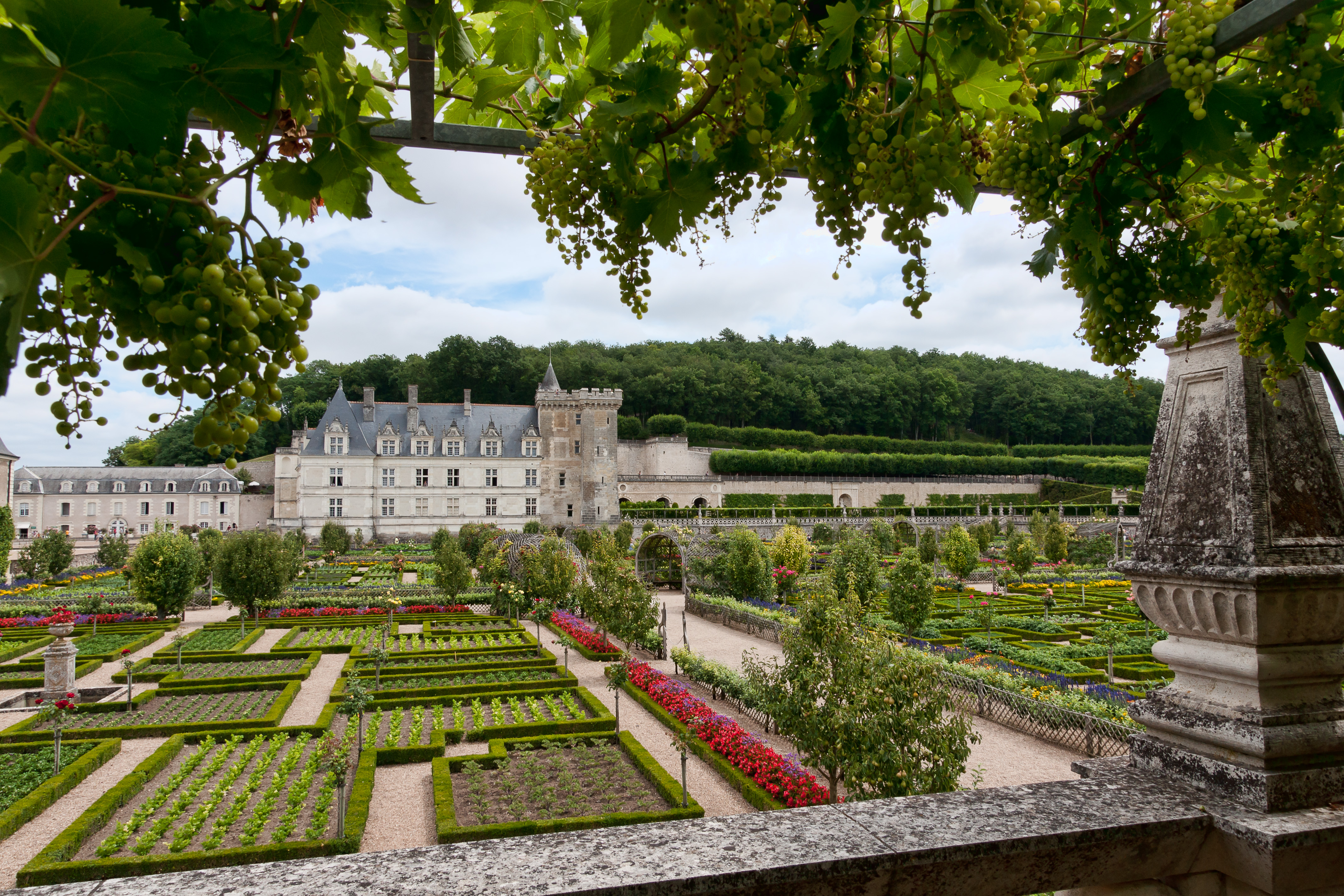
Château de Villandry

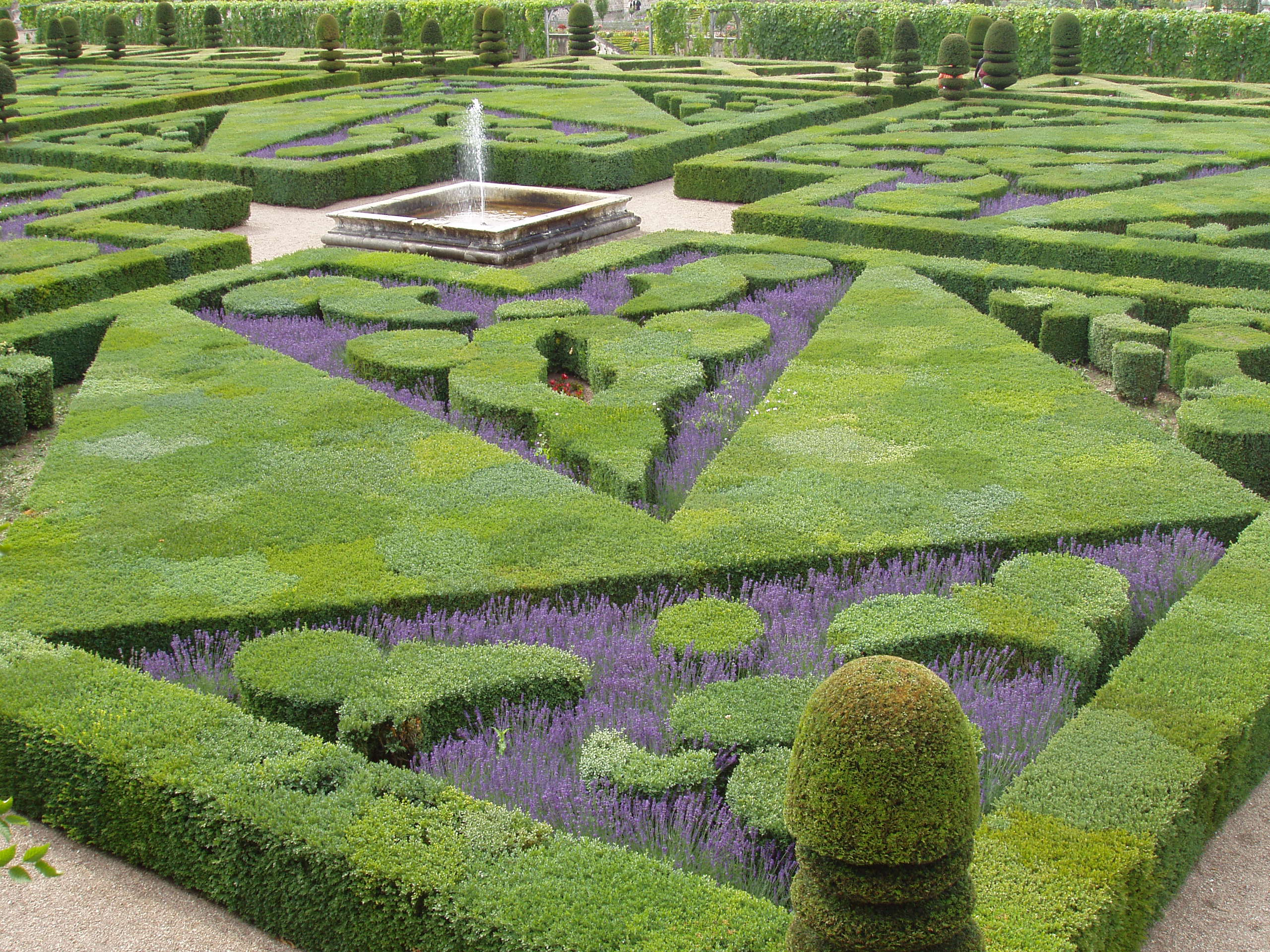
Garden at the Château

The parterre of Passionate Love, one of the four gardens of love in the ornamental garden

== See also ==
- List of châteaux in Centre-Val de Loire
