= Joachim Carvallo =

Spanish medical doctor (1869-1936)

Joaquín Carvallo (1869–1936) was a Spanish medical doctor and medical researcher born in Don Benito (Spain), who acquired and restored Château de Villandry and the creator of its spectacular gardens, recovering the French soul of the construction from 1536.

Joaquín Carvallo studied in the Universidad Complutense de Madrid and became a brilliant doctor. He travelled to Paris to work in the team of Dr Charles Richet, who was honored with the Physician Nobel Prize in 1913. While working with Richet's medical research team he met by chance an intern from Lebanon, Pennsylvania called Ann Coleman, who inherited an important business. She fell in love with the Spanish doctor while discussing the war that the US was launching against Spain to conquer Cuba (1898). The couple left Paris and found a peaceful place to live with their eldest daughter, Isabelle and their three younger sons, where they built a splendid Spanish art collection from the 17th century, that Carvallo and Coleman. It can be admired today on the walls of the castle (including the work of artists like Zurbarán, Alonso Cano, Juan de Arellano, & Berruguete).

Thanks to Anne Coleman's money after years of searching, they bought the Château de Villandry in the Indre-et-Loire in France's Loire Valley and began the dream of Joaquín Carvallo of restoring and improving the once magnificent château and its French styled gardens. Today, the gardens are a major tourist attraction, visited by the public at large and horticulturalists from around the world. Henri Carvallo, the doctor's great grandson, is the owner of Villandry and continues to enhance and expand the château's gardens.

== Sources ==
In 2004, Alix de Guitaut-Vienne published a history of the doctor's lifelong work on the château in a book titled Joaquín Carvallo et l'Oeuvre de la demeure historique (ISBN 3-9522154-6-5).
