= Brunnerville Road Bridge over Hammer Creek =

- Hammer Creek Bridge
- U.S. National Register of Historic Places
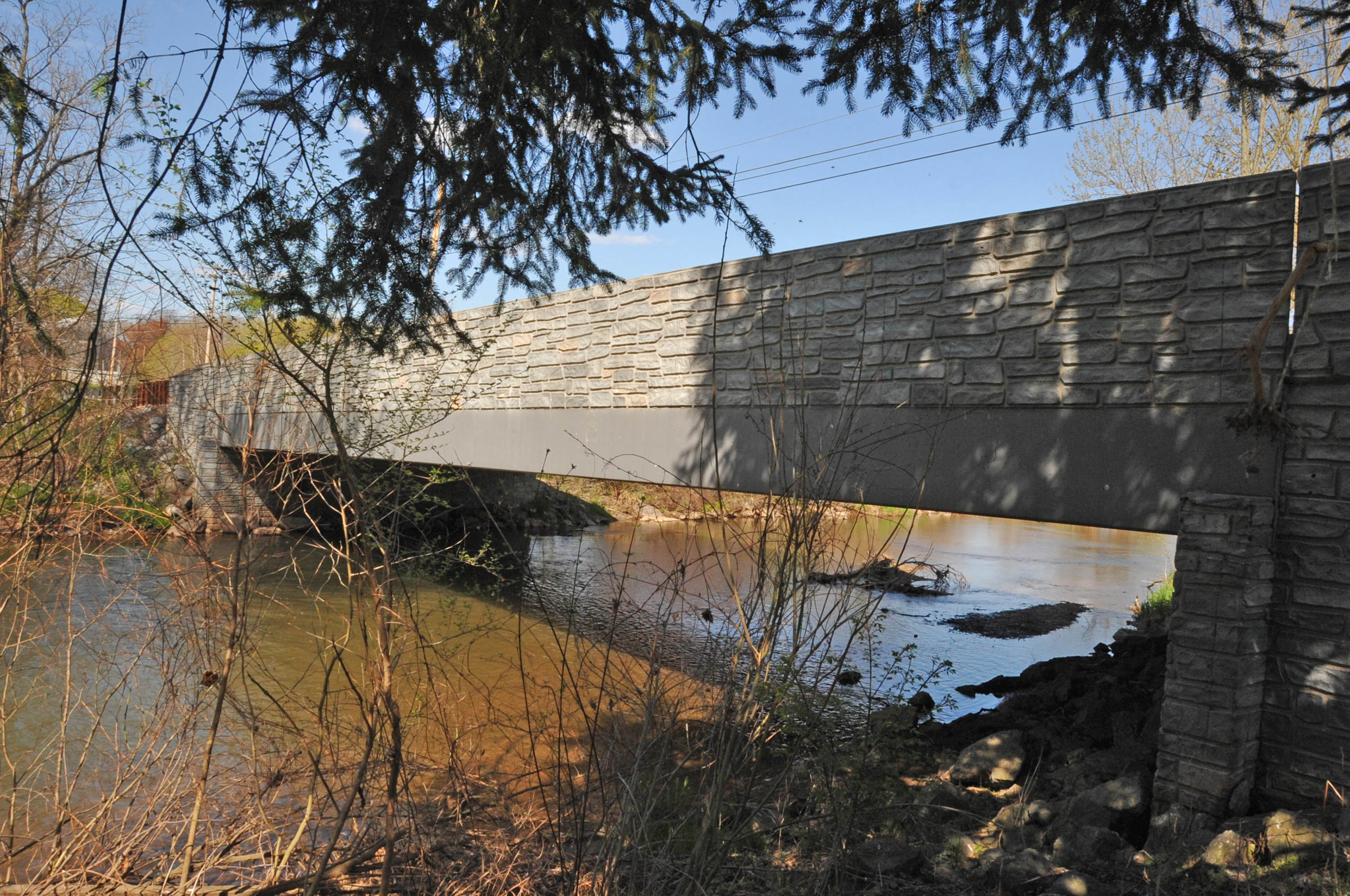
- Bridge in 2015

- Location within Pennsylvania Location within the United States
- Location: Legislative Route 36011 over Hammer Creek, Elizabeth Township and Warwick Township, Pennsylvania
- Coordinates: 40°11′48″N 76°16′45″W
- Area: less than one acre
- Built: 1904
- Built by: Ferro Concrete Co.
- MPS: Highway Bridges Owned by the Commonwealth of Pennsylvania, Department of Transportation TR
- NRHP reference No.: 88000872
- Added to NRHP: June 22, 1988

Hammer Creek Bridge, also known as Brunnerville Road Bridge over Hammer Creek, is a historic concrete arch bridge located at Elizabeth Township and Warwick Township in Lancaster County, Pennsylvania. It was built in 1908, and is a 75-foot-long (23 m) single arch bridge. The roadway crosses Hammer Creek.

It was listed on the National Register of Historic Places in 1988.
