= Clay Township, Lancaster County, Pennsylvania =

Township in Pennsylvania, US

Coordinates: 40°16′00″N 76°15′59″W

- Township
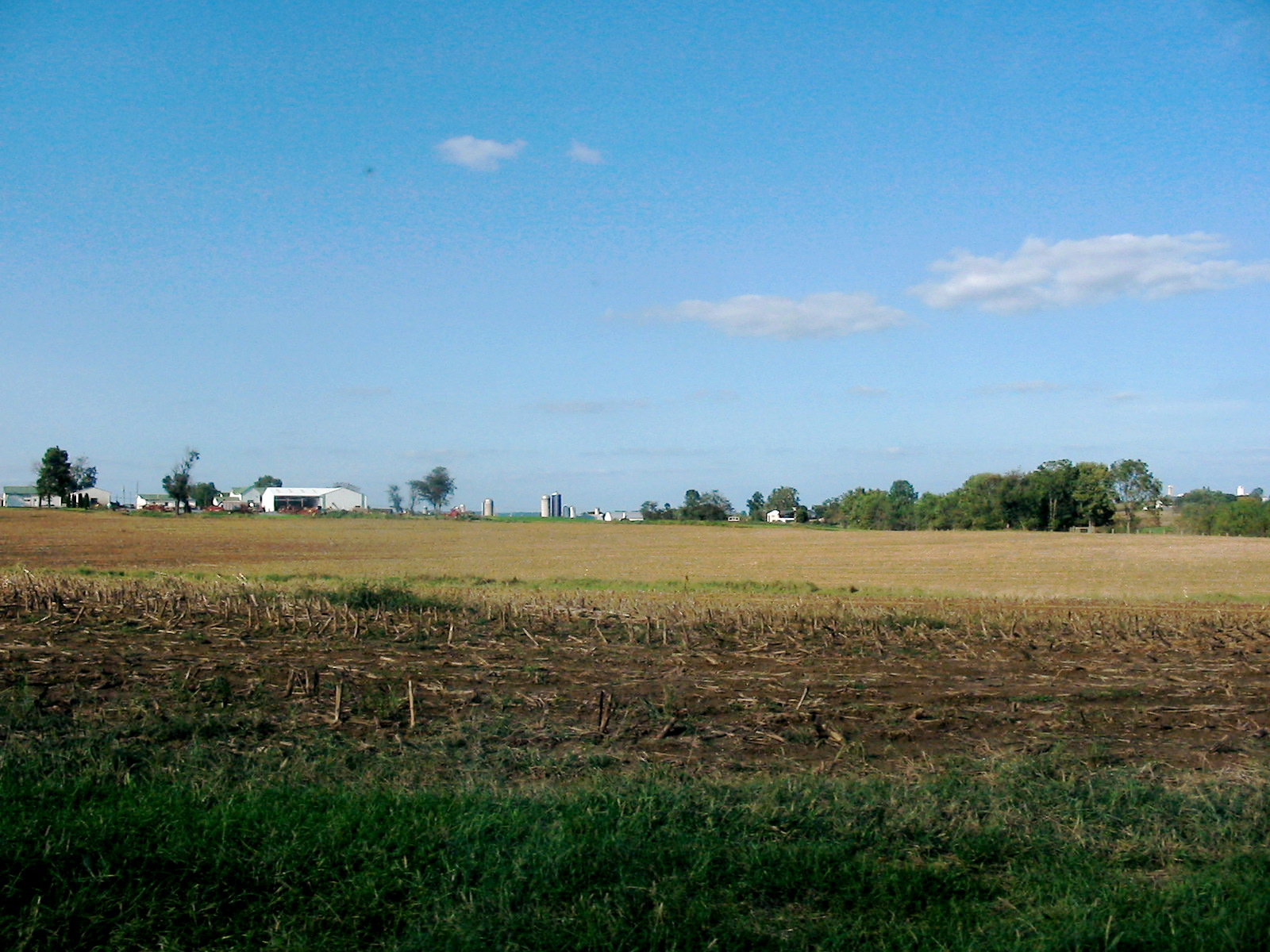
- Corn stubble near Weidmanville

- Seal

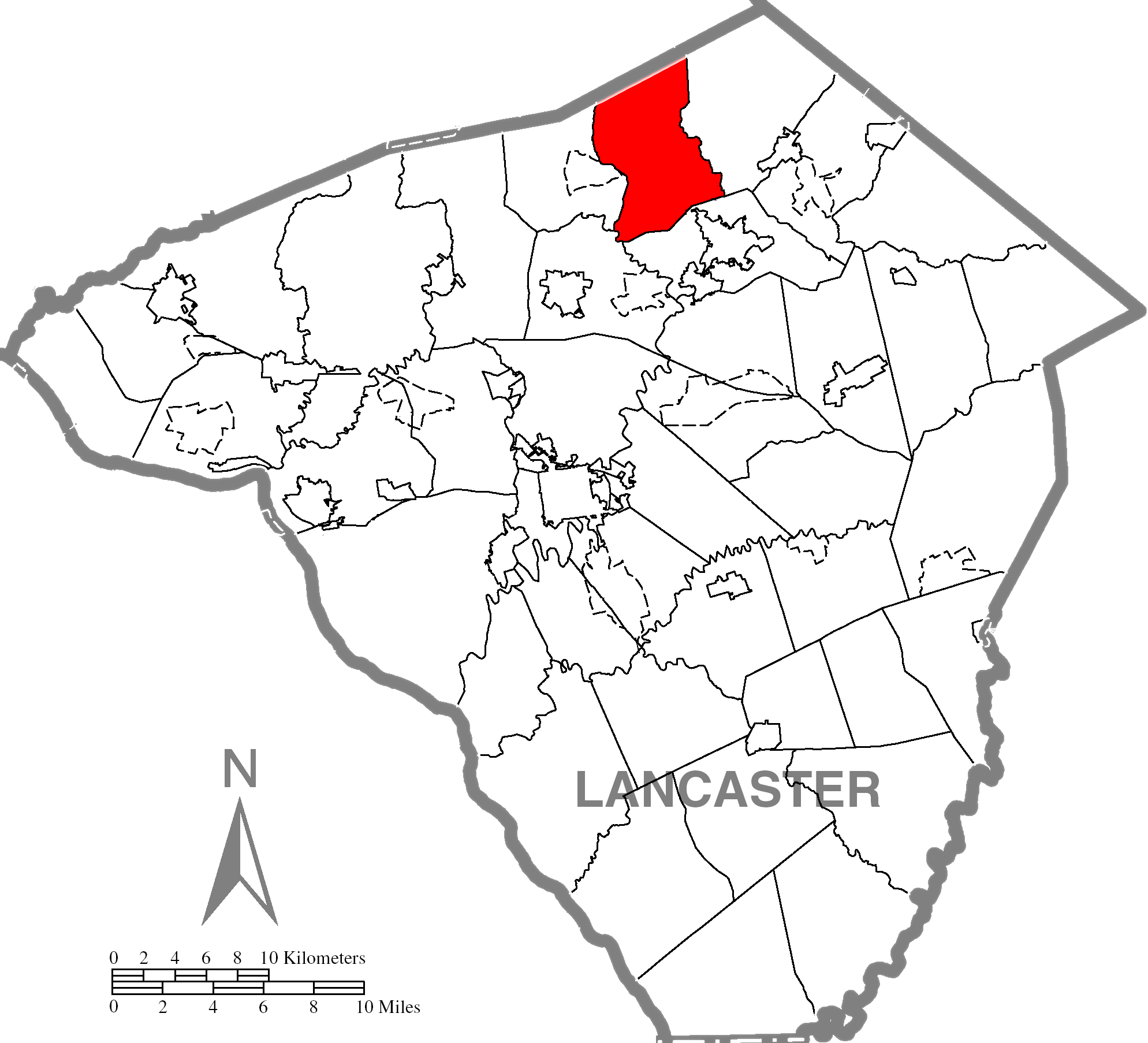
- Map of Lancaster County highlighting Clay Township
- Country: United States
- State: Pennsylvania
- County: Lancaster
- Settled: 1740
- Incorporated: 1853

Government
  - Type: Board of Supervisors

Area
  - Total: 22.75 sq mi (58.91 km^{2})
  - Land: 21.99 sq mi (56.96 km^{2})
  - Water: 0.75 sq mi (1.94 km^{2})

Population (2020)
  - Total: 6,887 ▲
  - Estimate (2021): 6,916
  - Density: 310.0/sq mi (119.71/km^{2})
- Time zone: UTC-5 (Eastern (EST))
  - Summer (DST): UTC-4 (EDT)
- Area code: 717
- FIPS code: 42-071-13960
- Website: claytwp.com

Clay Township is a township in north central Lancaster County, Pennsylvania, United States. The population was 6,887 at the 2020 census.

== Geography ==
According to the United States Census Bureau, the township has a total area of 22.8 square miles (59 km^{2}), of which 22.2 square miles (57 km^{2}) is land and 0.5 square miles (1.3 km^{2}) (2.37%) is water. It includes the communities of Hopeland, Mount Airy, Durlach, Clay, and Weidmanville. The Furnace Hills, rising to an elevation of 1,040 feet (320 m) on Black Oak Ridge, are in the northern part of the township.

== Demographics ==
Historical population
Census	Pop.	Note	%±
1980	3,718		—
1990	5,060		36.1%
2000	5,173		2.2%
2010	6,308		21.9%
2020	6,887		9.2%
2021 (est.)	6,916		0.4%
U.S. Decennial Census

As of the census of 2000, there were 5,173 people, 1,760 households, and 1,431 families living in the township. The population density was 232.7 inhabitants per square mile (89.8/km^{2}). There were 1,801 housing units at an average density of 81.0 per square mile (31.3/km^{2}). The racial makeup of the township was 97.89% White, 0.17% African American, 0.04% Native American, 0.79% Asian, 0.04% Pacific Islander, 0.19% from other races, and 0.87% from two or more races. Hispanic or Latino of any race were 0.56% of the population.

There were 1,759 households, out of which 38.2% had children under the age of 18 living with them, 73.5% were married couples living together, 5.5% had a female householder with no husband present, and 18.6% were non-families. 15.0% of all households were made up of individuals, and 5.9% had someone living alone who was 65 years of age or older. The average household size was 2.94 and the average family size was 3.27.

In the township the population was spread out, with 30.1% under the age of 18, 7.2% from 18 to 24, 28.3% from 25 to 44, 22.8% from 45 to 64, and 11.6% who were 65 years of age or older. The median age was 36 years. For every 100 females, there were 100.9 males. For every 100 females age 18 and over, there were 97.9 males.

The median income for a household in the township was $50,543, and the median income for a family was $55,119. Males had a median income of $38,767 versus $23,631 for females. The per capita income for the township was $19,009. About 5.1% of families and 5.5% of the population were below the poverty line, including 8.0% of those under age 18 and 2.1% of those age 65 or over.

== Tornado ==
On Sunday, March 29, 2009, at approximately 4:40 pm, an EF-1 tornado touched down in Clay Township. The tornado damaged 40 homes and other buildings, and was on the ground for 1.25 miles (2.01 km). The tornado then dissipated, and the storm continued northeastward into Berks County.
