= Cornwall, Pennsylvania =

Borough in Pennsylvania, United States

- Borough
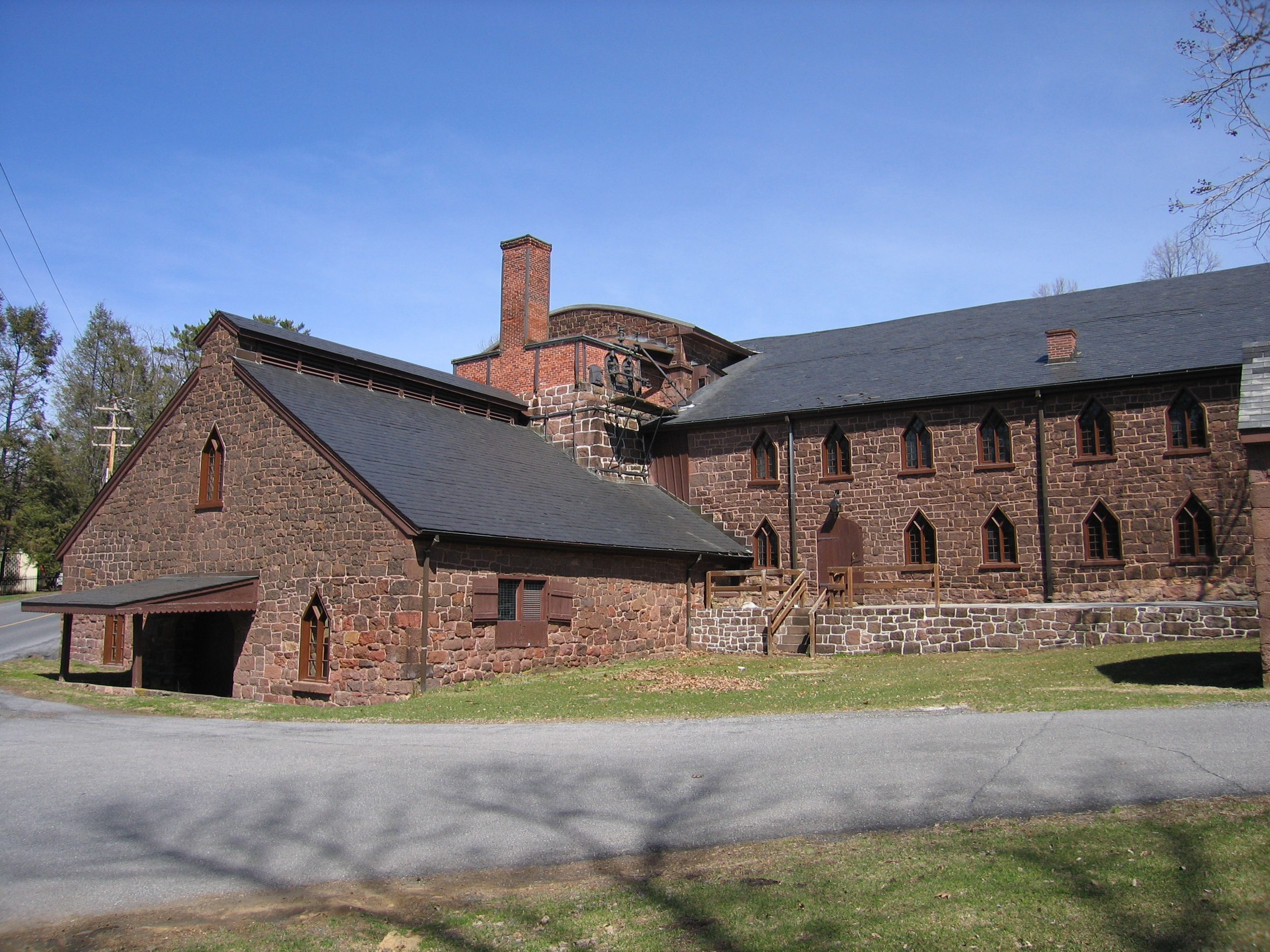
- Cornwall Iron Furnace

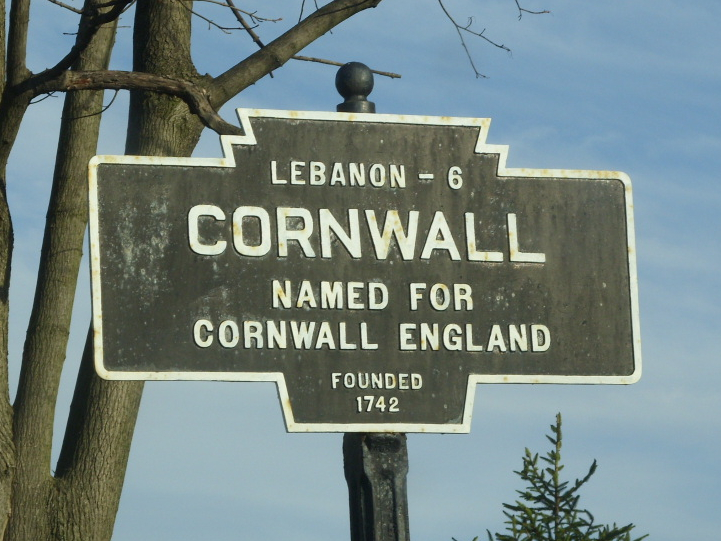
- Keystone Marker

- Location in Lebanon County, Pennsylvania

- Location in Pennsylvania Location in the United States
- Coordinates: 40°16′23″N 76°24′38″W
- Country: United States
- State: Pennsylvania
- County: Lebanon
- Settled: 1734
- Incorporated: 1926

Government
  - Type: Borough Council
  - Council President: Carl Hilton (R)

Area
  - Total: 9.76 sq mi (25.27 km^{2})
  - Land: 9.70 sq mi (25.13 km^{2})
  - Water: 0.054 sq mi (0.14 km^{2})
- Elevation: 554 ft (169 m)

Population (2020)
  - Total: 4,604
  - Density: 474/sq mi (183.2/km^{2})
- Time zone: UTC-5 (Eastern (EST))
  - Summer (DST): UTC-4 (EDT)
- ZIP code: 17016
- Area code: 717
- FIPS code: 42-16256
- Website: www.cornwall-pa.com

Cornwall is a borough in Lebanon County, Pennsylvania, United States. It is part of the Lebanon, PA Metropolitan Statistical Area. The population was 4,604 at the 2020 census.

== History ==
Cornwall was initially settled by Peter Grubb in 1734. Peter was a Chester County stonemason who came to, what was then Lancaster County, in search of high quality stone for quarrying. First building his house and then a store, he discovered magnetite iron ore nearby and decided to test its quality, he found the ore to be exceedingly pure. Grubb wrote to Philadelphia and in 1734 was granted a warrant to purchase 300 acres (1.2 km^{2}) of land. For three years Peter followed veins of ore until he found a large deposit that was easily accessible; however, this ore was not within the bounds of his property. So in 1737 he purchased an additional 142.5 acres (0.577 km^{2}) of land. In 1742, Peter built a cold blast furnace and named it Cornwall, after his father's birthplace in England. The Cornwall Iron Mine was, at one time, the largest open-pit mining operation in the world. They were mined continuously until June 30, 1973, totaling 236 years of production.

Finding the necessary components nearby for smelting iron (water, limestone and timber for charcoal), Grubb built the Cornwall Iron Furnace and began production in 1742. The operation also included the Hopewell Forges on nearby Hammer Creek. Peter Grubb did not stay long to run the operation, but leased it out in 1745 for 20 years and returned to Wilmington, Delaware. In 1765, Peter's sons Curtis and Peter Jr. took over the operation, and in 1798 it passed to Robert Coleman and his family. Cornwall Furnace was in production from 1742 until 1883, and appears today much as it was when production ended. In 1932 the Coleman family deeded the property to the Commonwealth of Pennsylvania and it is now a designated National Historic Landmark open to the public.

Eventually the whole town became known as Cornwall. It was incorporated as a borough on October 11, 1926, after having been a part of Lancaster County and for a while of Dauphin County. At the time it officially became a borough, it comprised six widely separated villages.

Alden Villa was added to the National Register of Historic Places in 2011.

== Geography ==
Cornwall is located at 40°16′23″N 76°24′38″W (40.273192, -76.410667).

According to the United States Census Bureau, the borough has a total area of 9.9 square miles (26 km^{2}), of which 9.8 square miles (25 km^{2}) is land and 0.1 square miles (0.26 km^{2}) (1.11%) is water.

== Demographics ==
Historical population
| Census | Pop. | Note | %± |
|---|---|---|---|
| 1930 | 1,837 | | — |
| 1940 | 1,680 | | −8.5% |
| 1950 | 1,760 | | 4.8% |
| 1960 | 1,934 | | 9.9% |
| 1970 | 2,111 | | 9.2% |
| 1980 | 2,653 | | 25.7% |
| 1990 | 3,231 | | 21.8% |
| 2000 | 3,486 | | 7.9% |
| 2010 | 4,112 | | 18.0% |
| 2020 | 4,604 | | 12.0% |

=== 2020 census ===
As of the 2020 census, Cornwall had a population of 4,604. The median age was 58.3 years. 14.6% of residents were under the age of 18 and 38.3% of residents were 65 years of age or older. For every 100 females there were 91.1 males, and for every 100 females age 18 and over there were 87.9 males age 18 and over.

52.9% of residents lived in urban areas, while 47.1% lived in rural areas.

There were 2,033 households in Cornwall, of which 19.2% had children under the age of 18 living in them. Of all households, 63.5% were married-couple households, 11.8% were households with a male householder and no spouse or partner present, and 20.4% were households with a female householder and no spouse or partner present. About 24.9% of all households were made up of individuals and 17.4% had someone living alone who was 65 years of age or older.

There were 2,144 housing units, of which 5.2% were vacant. The homeowner vacancy rate was 1.0% and the rental vacancy rate was 9.0%.

Racial composition as of the 2020 census
| Race | Number | Percent |
|---|---|---|
| White | 4,319 | 93.8% |
| Black or African American | 44 | 1.0% |
| American Indian and Alaska Native | 0 | 0.0% |
| Asian | 56 | 1.2% |
| Native Hawaiian and Other Pacific Islander | 0 | 0.0% |
| Some other race | 55 | 1.2% |
| Two or more races | 130 | 2.8% |
| Hispanic or Latino (of any race) | 136 | 3.0% |

=== 2000 census ===
As of the 2000 census, there were 3,486 people, 1,210 households, and 965 families residing in the borough. The population density was 357.2 inhabitants per square mile (137.9/km^{2}). There were 1,261 housing units at an average density of 129.2 units per square mile (49.9 units/km^{2}). The racial makeup of the borough was 97.79% White, 0.34% African American, 0.20% Native American, 1.06% Asian, 0.32% from other races, and 0.29% from two or more races. Hispanic or Latino of any race were 0.75% of the population.

There were 1,210 households, out of which 32.6% had children under the age of 18 living with them, 71.9% were married couples living together, 4.4% had a female householder with no husband present, and 20.2% were non-families. 17.5% of all households were made up of individuals, and 9.1% had someone living alone who was 65 years of age or older. The average household size was 2.58 and the average family size was 2.91.

In the borough the population was spread out, with 20.9% under the age of 18, 4.9% from 18 to 24, 22.7% from 25 to 44, 28.1% from 45 to 64, and 23.5% who were 65 years of age or older. The median age was 46 years. For every 100 females there were 89.7 males. For every 100 females age 18 and over, there were 82.9 males.

The median income for a household in the borough was $59,550, and the median income for a family was $66,964. Males had a median income of $44,926 versus $28,125 for females. The per capita income for the borough was $27,904. About 1.1% of families and 1.7% of the population were below the poverty line, including 1.0% of those under age 18 and 4.2% of those age 65 or over.
