= Brickerville, Pennsylvania =

Unincorporated community in Pennsylvania, US

- Census-designated place
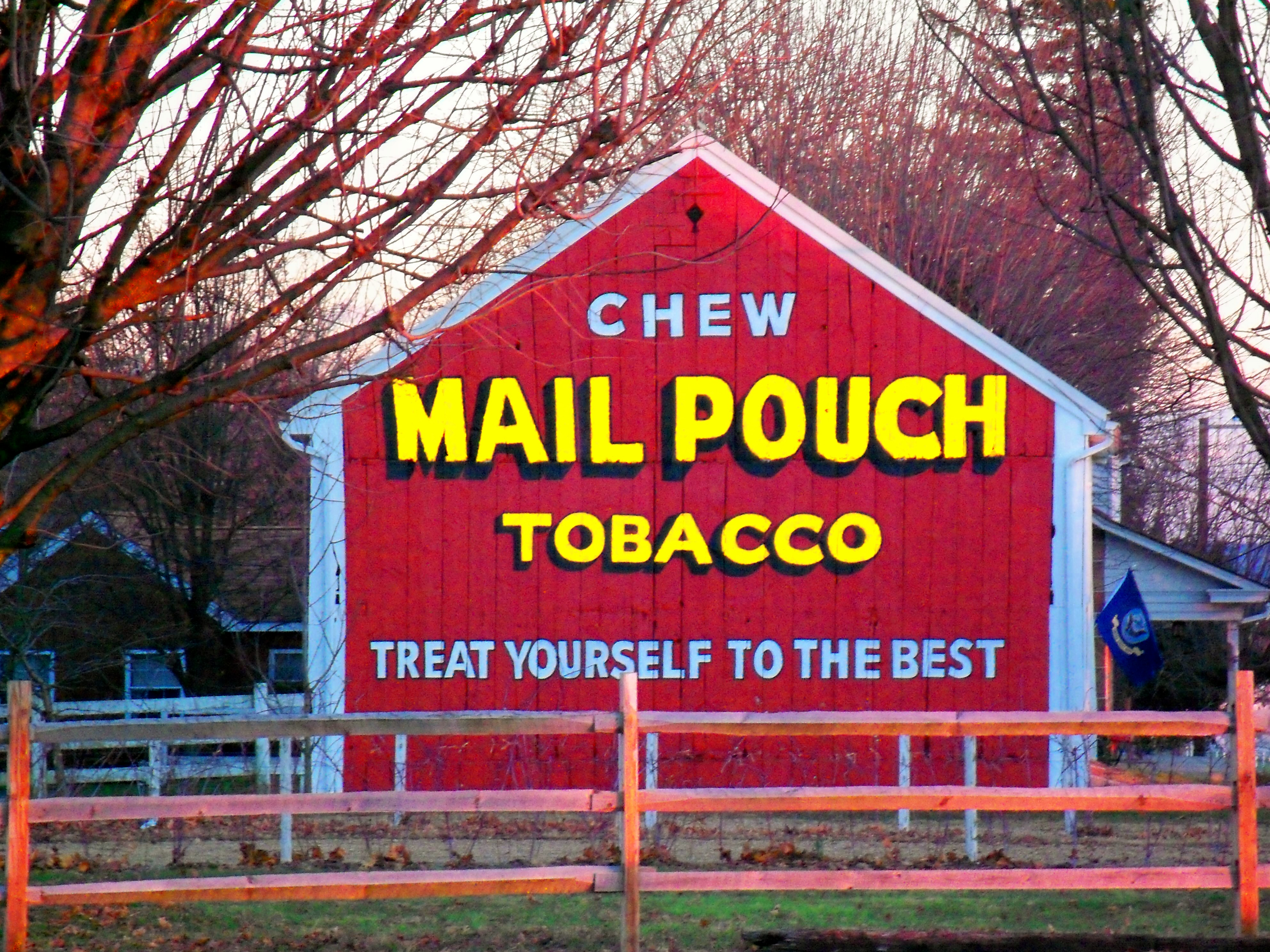
- Barn near Brickerville

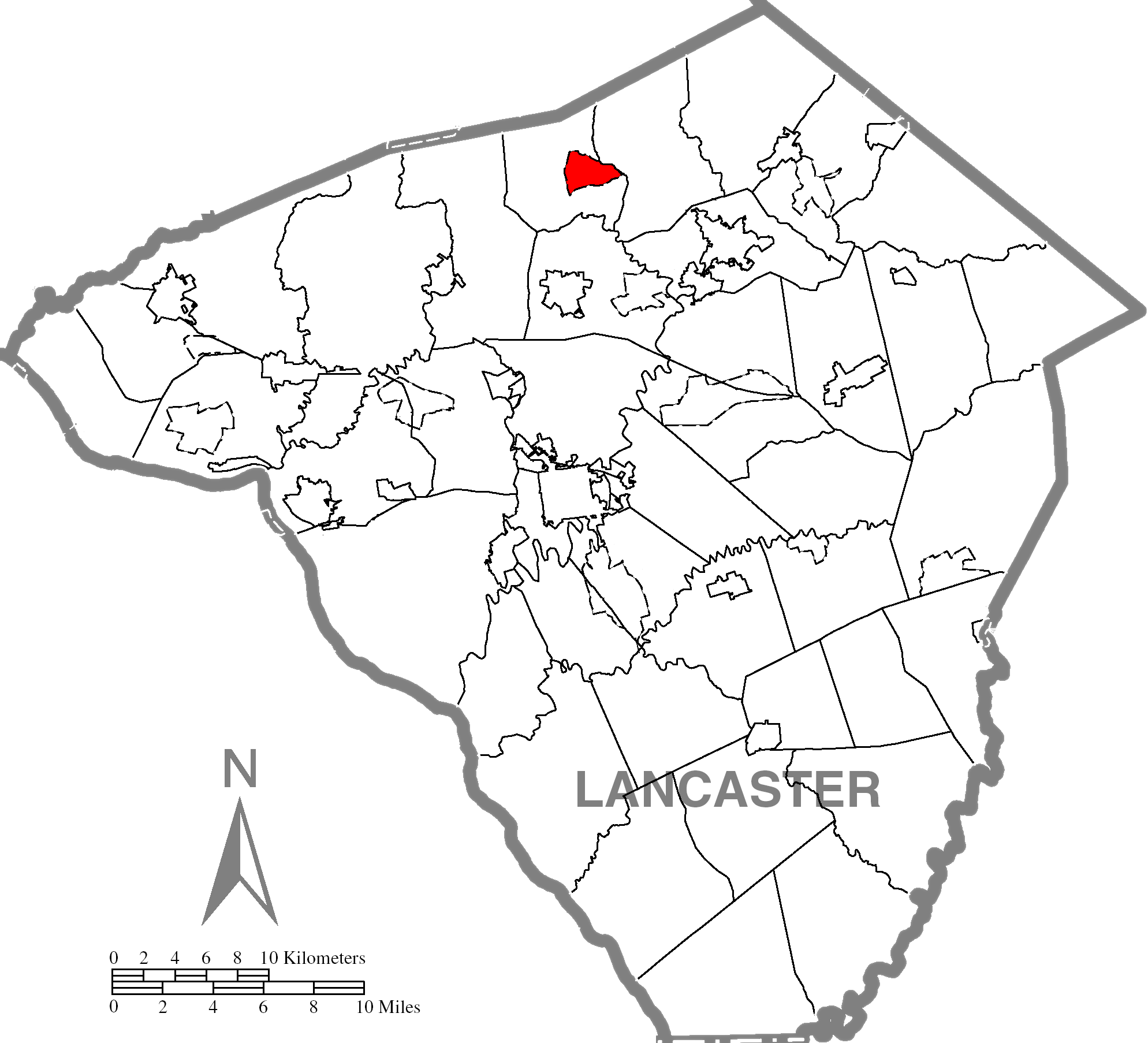
- Location in Lancaster County

- Location in Pennsylvania Location in the United States
- Coordinates: 40°13′33″N 76°18′09″W
- Country: United States
- State: Pennsylvania
- County: Lancaster
- Township: Elizabeth

Area
  - Total: 2.19 sq mi (5.67 km^{2})
  - Land: 2.17 sq mi (5.62 km^{2})
  - Water: 0.019 sq mi (0.05 km^{2})
- Elevation: 538 ft (164 m)

Population (2020)
  - Total: 1,277
  - Density: 588.5/sq mi (227.23/km^{2})
- Time zone: UTC-5 (Eastern (EST))
  - Summer (DST): UTC-4 (EDT)
- ZIP code: 17543
- Area code: 717
- GNIS feature ID: 1170231
- FIPS code: 42-08504

Brickerville is an unincorporated community and census-designated place (CDP) in Elizabeth Township, Lancaster County, Pennsylvania, United States, with a ZIP code of 17543. The population was 1,309 at the 2010 census.

== Geography ==
Brickerville is located in northern Lancaster County at 40°13′33″N 76°18′09″W, in the eastern part of Elizabeth Township. U.S. Route 322 (28th Division Highway) passes through the center of town, leading west-northwest 35 miles (56 km) to Harrisburg, the state capital, and southeast 7 miles (11 km) to Ephrata. Pennsylvania Route 501 (Furnace Hills Pike) crosses US 322 in Brickerville, leading north 6 miles (10 km) to Schaefferstown and south 5 miles (8 km) to Lititz. Lancaster, the county seat, is 13 miles (21 km) south of Brickerville via PA 501.

According to the United States Census Bureau, the CDP has a total area of 2.2 square miles (5.7 km^{2}), of which 0.02 square miles (0.05 km^{2}), or 0.84%, are water. The community sits on a ridge which drains northeast to Furnace Run, a tributary of Middle Creek, and south to Hammer Creek. Middle Creek and Hammer Creek are tributaries of Cocalico Creek, part of the Conestoga River watershed draining to the Susquehanna River.

== Demographics ==
Historical population
Census	Pop.	Note	%±
2020	1,277		—
U.S. Decennial Census

At the 2000 census there were 1,287 people, 433 households, and 374 families living in the CDP. The population density was 580.0 inhabitants per square mile (223.9/km^{2}). There were 438 housing units at an average density of 197.4 units per square mile (76.2 units/km^{2}). The racial makeup of the CDP was 99.07% White, 0.16% Black or African American, 0.08% Native American, 0.31% Asian, 0.16% from other races, and 0.23% from two or more races. 1.79% of the population were Hispanic or Latino of any race. There were 433 households, 38.6% had children under the age of 18 living with them, 80.4% were married couples living together, 4.4% had a female householder with no husband present, and 13.4% were non-families. 10.4% of households were made up of individuals, and 4.4% were one person aged 65 or older. The average household size was 2.97 and the average family size was 3.19.

The age distribution was 27.8% under the age of 18, 9.0% from 18 to 24, 29.7% from 25 to 44, 25.3% from 45 to 64, and 8.2% 65 or older. The median age was 37 years. For every 100 females, there were 107.9 males. For every 100 females age 18 and over, there were 100.2 males.

The median household income was $51,000 and the median family income was $54,167. Males had a median income of $40,583 versus $28,533 for females. The per capita income for the CDP was $19,052. About 5.4% of families and 8.1% of the population were below the poverty line, including 14.0% of those under age 18 and none of those age 65 or over.
