= Allentown Railroad =

Railway company in Pennsylvania

- Map of the completed section of the Allentown Railroad

Overview
- Headquarters: Reading
- Locale: Berks County, Pennsylvania, U.S.
- Dates of operation: 1870–1945
- Successor: Reading Company

Technical
- Length: 4.4 miles (7.1 km)

The Allentown Railroad was a railway company in the United States. It was incorporated in 1853 with the original intention to connect the Central Railroad of New Jersey at Allentown with the Pennsylvania Railroad's main line across the Allegheny Mountains. Though grading was almost entirely finished, the project was halted by the Panic of 1857, and the completion of the East Pennsylvania Railroad in 1859 made the Allentown Railroad's proposed line largely redundant. s a result, track was never laid on most of the line.

The small portion that did became the Allentown branch of the Reading Company from Topton to Kutztown, and was nominally owned by the Allentown Railroad until the Reading dissolved it in 1945 to simplify corporate bookkeeping. Other Reading subsidiaries also laid track on parts of the right-of-way elsewhere along the route. The short line Allentown and Auburn Railroad continues to operate freight service on the Topton to Kutztown route.

== Origins ==
The Central Railroad of New Jersey (CNJ) had reached Phillipsburg, New Jersey in 1852, on the outskirts of the Lehigh Valley, and anticipated extension to Allentown. If a direct route could be built from Allentown to the Susquehanna River, western traffic could reach New York City faster than by detouring through Philadelphia and traveling north over the Camden and Amboy Railroad.

Such a route would run parallel to South Mountain and other mountains in the region, and a lateral railroad for the transport of anthracite coal already extended west from the Susquehanna. The Dauphin and Susquehanna Coal Company (D&S) operated a railroad which connected with the PRR at Rockville (where their main line crossed the Susquehanna), ran north along the river to Dauphin, and turned northeast to run up Stony Valley to the Rausch Gap coal mines. It proved to be a willing partner in the plan.

== Construction of route ==
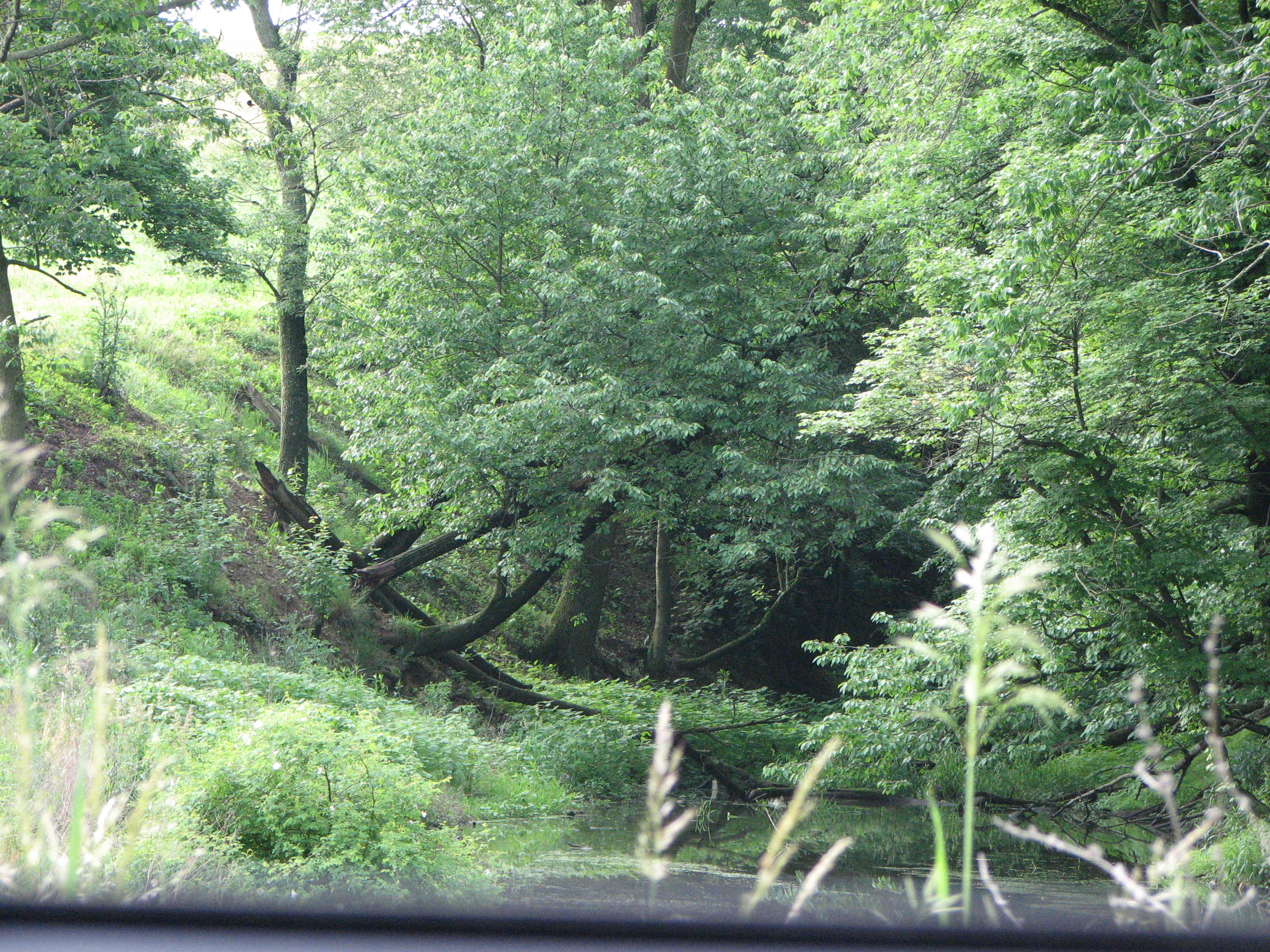
An unfinished tunnel on the Allentown Railroad in 2009

The D&S and CNJ jointly procured a charter, issued April 19, 1853, for the Allentown Railroad, which would construct the first segment of the route. It ran n from Allentown to the Reading main line between Auburn and Port Clinton, with a branch into Kutztown. The Dauphin and Susquehanna Coal Company had charter rights to connect with any rail line in Schuylkill County, and it began building an extension of its line, starting from the Reading at Auburn and driving westward. By November 4, 1853, the new line of the D&S was open from Auburn to Pine Grove, following Bear Creek to its headwaters and then dropping down Lower Little Swatara Creek. Work continued on the more difficult middle segment, which required heavier grading to climb along the slopes of Second Mountain and enter Stony Valley at Fishing Creek Gap.

On March 13, 1854, a second railroad, the Auburn and Port Clinton Railroad, was chartered for the project. This would connect the D&S at Auburn with the Allentown RR at Port Clinton, running parallel to the Reading main line along the Schuylkill River. The combined railroads were sometimes unofficially referred to as the Auburn and Allentown Railroad. On April 13, 1854, the charters of both the Allentown and the A&PC railroads were amended to allow them to merge with the Lehigh Valley Railroad, then building down through Allentown towards Easton across the Delaware River from Phillipsburg, New Jersey. The line from Pine Grove to Rausch Gap was completed in June, and the D&S ran its first through train.

In 1855, work began in earnest on the Allentown Railroad itself. The route chosen left Allentown in a southwesterly direction, passing through Dorneyville, Wescosville, Trexlertown, and Breinigsville. Ducking through Topton, it ran directly through Kutztown and followed Sacony Creek through the hills to Virginville. From there, it followed small streams west and north to Windsor Castle, site of the line's one tunnel. It was to be 1,100 feet (340 m) long, with rubble masonry portals. Leaving the tunnel, it would skirt the edges of Hamburg and push through the gorge of the Schuylkill to reach Port Clinton.

By July 1856, the CNJ was prepared to abandon the project in favor of a rival route, via Reading. However, other investors pressed on, and the Auburn & Port Clinton was merged into the Allentown Railroad on January 1, 1857. The Panic of 1857, however, brought work to a halt. The D&S was foreclosed and reorganized on April 1, 1859, as the Schuylkill and Susquehanna Railroad under control of the Reading Railroad.

On May 11, 1859, the East Pennsylvania Railroad opened, connecting Allentown and Reading. From Reading, traffic could either pass north to Auburn and thence over the Schuylkill and Susquehanna, or west over the Lebanon Valley Branch to Harrisburg. The distance cut off by the direct route from Port Clinton to Allentown was minimal, so when the Reading gained control of the Allentown RR on July 12, 1860, it saw no reason to complete it.

== Reading and later operation ==
The Reading briefly considered a revival of the project in 1869, but on May 1, 1869, it obtained a lease of the East Penn. This road would become a permanent part of the Reading system, and the Allentown Railroad's plans were negated forever. The Reading did lay rail on a small segment of the grade from the East Penn at Topton to reach Kutztown, a branch that opened on January 10, 1870. The Allentown Railroad remained a corporate entity in the Reading system until it was merged in on December 31, 1945, to simplify the corporate structure of that railroad and to save on taxes, as with a series of other mergers the next year. The line survived the bankruptcy and breakup of the Reading: it is now owned by the Kutztown Transportation Authority and operated by the Allentown and Auburn Railroad, which uses historic railroad equipment to haul passengers. They also haul freight traffic.

A portion of the grade from Trexlertown to Breinigsville was used by the Catasauqua and Fogelsville Railroad to build a branch to local limonite deposits. This line, too, eventually came under Reading control. Finally, the Reading used a short segment of the right-of-way in Allentown itself to reach a Mack Truck plant in 1917.

== Relics ==
Grading of the line was nearly complete by 1857, and many traces still remain today. Bridge abutments for the crossing of the Little Lehigh Creek were dismantled by Works Project Administration crews in the 1930s. A portion of the grading can still be seen on the southeast side of the intersection of Cedar Crest Boulevard and Route 222, near Dorney Park & Wildwater Kingdom, and on the north side of Route 222 between Grange and Krocks Roads. Turning Leaf Trail in Trexlertown and most of Wentz Road in Breinigsville were built on the part of the grade used by the Catasauqua and Fogelsville. Beyond the end of rail in Kutztown, the grade is intermittently intact along the Sacony, and almost continuous from Virginville to Hamburg.

Field Survey from March 2010 shows the graded ROW still very visible on the east side of Grange Road and on the west side of Krocks Road, as well as on the south side of Hamilton Boulevard just east of Cedar Crest Boulevard.
