= Cold Spring Township, Pennsylvania =

Township in Pennsylvania, US

Coordinates: 40.507°N 76.587°W

- Township
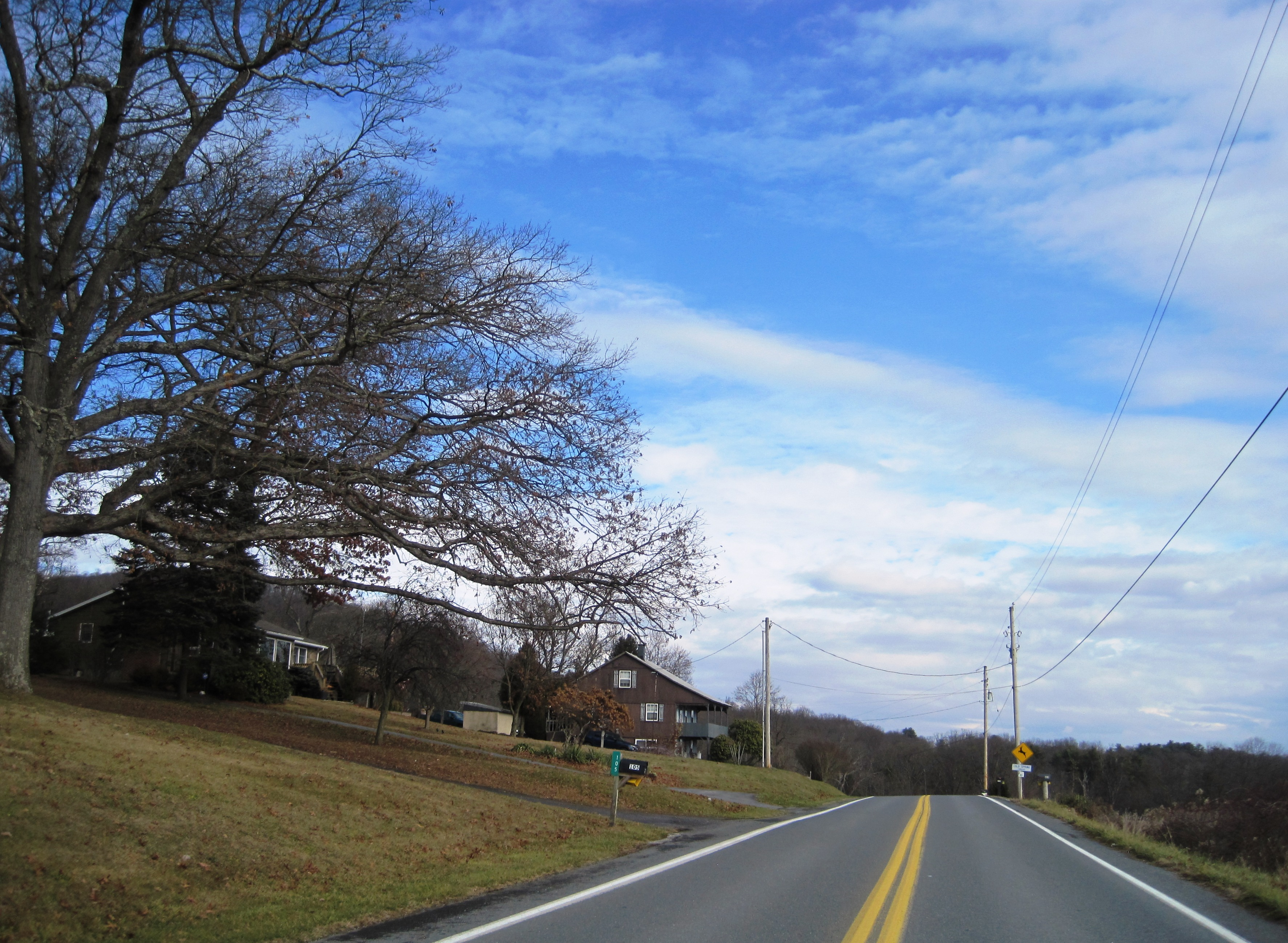
- Houses along Gold Mine Road, the only settled portion of the township

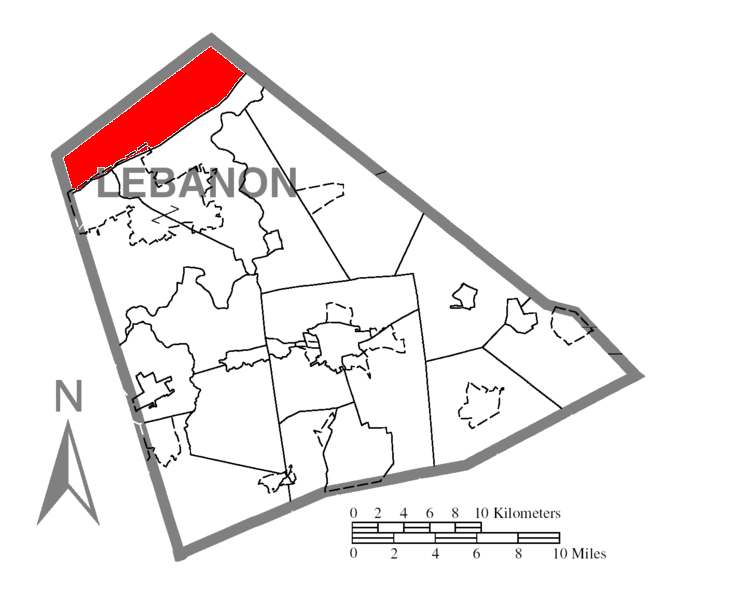
- Map of Lebanon County, Pennsylvania highlighting Cold Spring Township

- Map of Lebanon County, Pennsylvania
- Country: United States
- State: Pennsylvania
- County: Lebanon
- Settled: 1775
- Incorporated: 1853

Area
  - Total: 24.82 sq mi (64.28 km^{2})
  - Land: 24.81 sq mi (64.26 km^{2})
  - Water: 0.0077 sq mi (0.02 km^{2})

Population (2020)
  - Total: 60
  - Estimate (2021): 59
  - Density: 2.2/sq mi (0.84/km^{2})
- Time zone: UTC-5 (Eastern (EST))
  - Summer (DST): UTC-4 (EDT)
- Area code: 717
- FIPS code: 42-075-14944

Historical population
Census	Pop.	Note	%±
2000	49		—
2010	52		6.1%
2020	60		15.4%
2021 (est.)	59		−1.7%
U.S. Decennial Census

Cold Spring Township is a township in Lebanon County, Pennsylvania, United States. It is part of the Lebanon, PA Metropolitan Statistical Area. The population was 52 at the 2010 census.

Almost all of the township is part of the Pennsylvania State Game Lands Number 211. There are about twelve houses near Second Mountain. The single road - Gold Mine Road - is state-maintained. There are no local municipal taxes, no water, sewage, or road departments, no municipal building, and no public officials. There has apparently been no local government "since 1961, according to newspaper records, when folks just stopped running for office."

Three small settlements, Ellendale, Rausch Gap and a resort town named Cold Spring, once had a population of about 2,000 total, but no longer exist. The Cold Spring resort closed about 1900.

The Appalachian Trail runs through Pennsylvania State Game Lands Number 211, and south of the township, in Swatara State Park.

== Geography ==
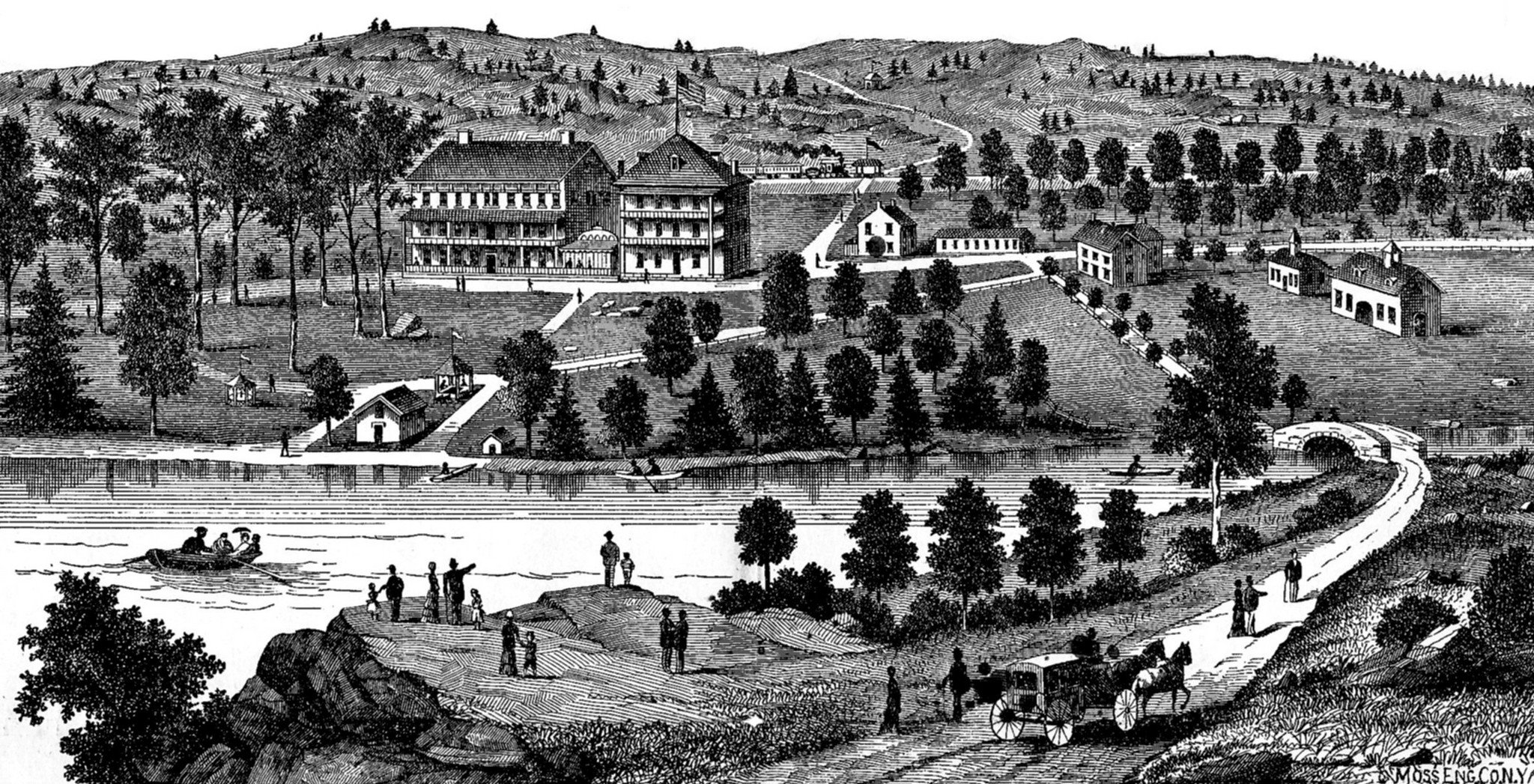
Cold Spring resort, before 1900

According to the United States Census Bureau, the township has a total area of 24.3 square miles (63 km^{2}), of which 24.3 square miles (63 km^{2}) is land and 0.04% is water.

Cold Spring Township is bordered to the north by Rush Township, to the west by East Hanover Township, to the east by Tremont Township and Pine Grove Township, and to the south by East Hanover Township and Union Township.

The township contains part of the census-designated place of Fort Indiantown Gap.

== Demographics ==
As of the census of 2000, there were 49 people, 19 households, and 12 families residing in the township. The population density was 2.0 people per square mile (0.8/km^{2}). There were 25 housing units at an average density of 1.0/sq mi (0.4/km^{2}). The racial makeup of the township was 100.00% White. Hispanic or Latino of any race were 6.12% of the population.

There were 19 households, out of which 31.6% had children under the age of 18 living with them, 52.6% were married couples living together, 10.5% had a female householder with no husband present, and 31.6% were non-families. 26.3% of all households were made up of individuals, and 5.3% had someone living alone who was 65 years of age or older. The average household size was 2.58 and the average family size was 3.15.

In the township the population was spread out, with 26.5% under the age of 18, 30.6% from 25 to 44, 36.7% from 45 to 64, and 6.1% who were 65 years of age or older. The median age was 40 years. For every 100 females, there were 113.0 males. For every 100 females age 18 and over, there were 100.0 males.

The median income for a household in the township was $26,563, and the median income for a family was $26,563. Males had a median income of $38,750 versus $26,250 for females. The per capita income for the township was $8,792. There were 17.6% of families and 15.6% of the population living below the poverty line, including 12.2% of under eighteens and none of those over 64.
