= Allentown branch =

Overview
- Owner: Kutztown Transportation Authority
- Line number: USRA No. 910

Service
- Operator(s): Allentown and Auburn Railroad

History
- Opened: January 10, 1870

Technical
- Line length: 4.4 mi (7.1 km)
- Number of tracks: 1
- Track gauge: 1,435 mm (4 ft 8 1/2 in) standard gauge

The Allentown branch, also known as the Kutztown branch or the Kutztown industrial track, is a railway line in Pennsylvania. It runs 4 miles (6.4 km) from a junction with the Reading Line at Topton to Kutztown. The line was built in 1870 by the Allentown Railroad and was part of the Reading Company system until 1976. The Kutztown Transportation Authority has owned the line since 2000. The Allentown and Auburn Railroad is the current operator.

== History ==
Promoters of the Allentown Railroad conceived of a new through route between the Lehigh Valley and Port Clinton. These plans never developed, and in the end only a 4.4-mile (7.1 km) branch from Topton to Kutztown was built. Operation began on January 10, 1870.

The Philadelphia and Reading Railroad leased the Allentown Railroad from the beginning of operation. The line was known first as the Allentown branch and later as the Kutztown industrial track. The Allentown Railroad was one of twelve railroads merged into the Reading Company effective December 31, 1945.

On the Reading Company's final bankruptcy in 1976, ownership of the line remained with the reorganized Reading estate. The final system plan of the United States Railway Association classed the line as "light density" and it was not conveyed to Conrail. Conrail operated the line under subsidy. After Conrail ceased operating the line in 1982, the state purchased the line and designated the Anthracite Railway as operator beginning in 1983. The Reading Blue Mountain and Northern Railroad replaced the Anthracite Railway in 1989, followed by Penn Eastern Rail Lines in 1996.

The Kutztown Transportation Authority acquired the line from Pennsylvania in 2000. In 2013, the Allentown and Auburn Railroad took over as its operator.
