= Union Township, Lebanon County, Pennsylvania =

Township in Pennsylvania, US

Coordinates: 40°25′00″N 76°29′49″W

- Township
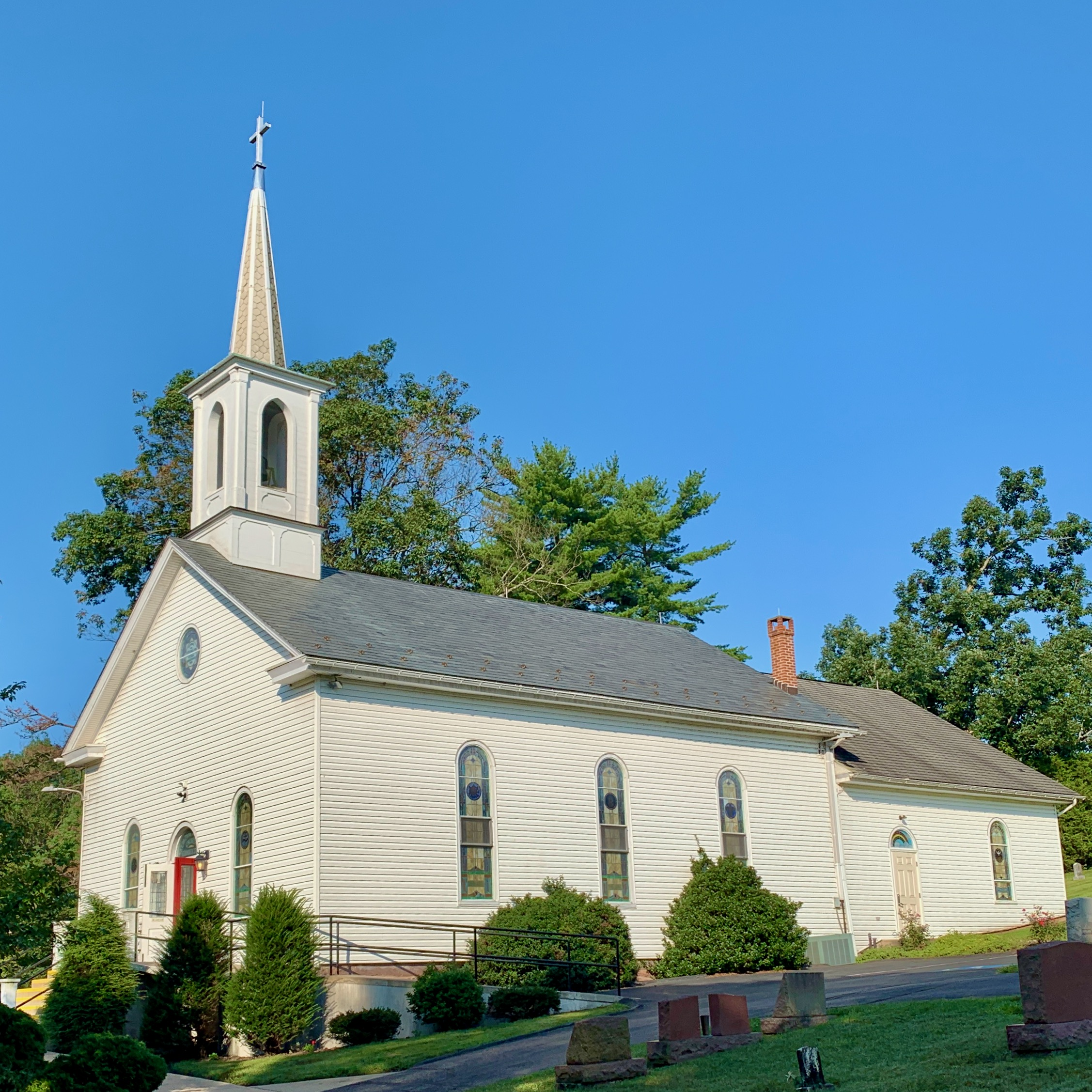
- Sattazahn Lutheran Church on Green Point School Road in September 2020

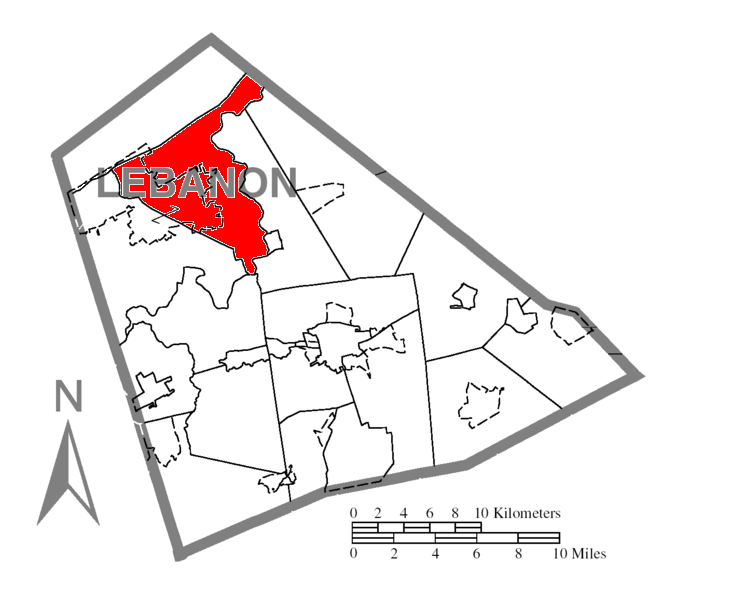
- Location of Union Township in Lebanon County, Pennsylvania

- Map of Lebanon County, Pennsylvania
- Country: United States
- State: Pennsylvania
- County: Lebanon
- Settled: 1738
- Incorporated: 1842

Area
  - Total: 29.66 sq mi (76.83 km^{2})
  - Land: 29.64 sq mi (76.77 km^{2})
  - Water: 0.023 sq mi (0.06 km^{2})

Population (2020)
  - Total: 2,925 ▼
  - Estimate (2021): 2,909
  - Density: 106.3/sq mi (41.03/km^{2})
- Time zone: UTC-5 (Eastern (EST))
  - Summer (DST): UTC-4 (EDT)
- Area code: 717
- FIPS code: 42-075-78376
- Website: uniontownshippa.com

Historical population
| Census | Pop. | Note | %± |
|---|---|---|---|
| 2000 | 2,590 | | — |
| 2010 | 3,099 | | 19.7% |
| 2020 | 2,925 | | −5.6% |
| 2021 (est.) | 2,909 | | −0.5% |
U.S. Decennial Census

Union Township is a township in Lebanon County, Pennsylvania, United States. It is part of the Lebanon, Pennsylvania metropolitan statistical area. The population was 2,925 at the 2020 census.

== History ==
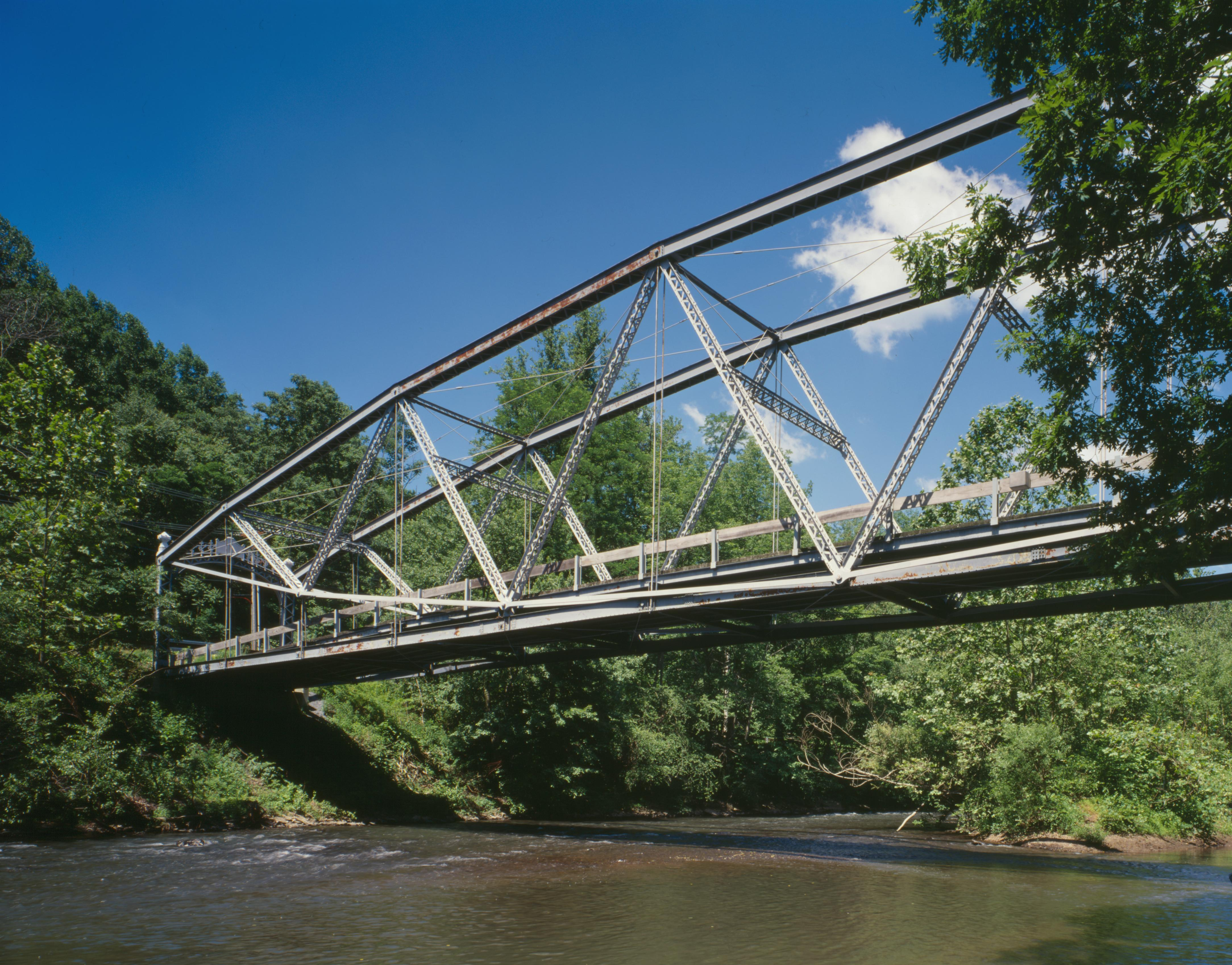
Waterville Bridge in Swatara State Park

Waterville Bridge in the township was added to the National Register of Historic Places in 1980.

== Geography ==
According to the U.S. Census Bureau, the township has a total area of 29.9 square miles (77.5 km^{2}), 29.9 square miles (77.5 km^{2}) of which is land and 0.04 square mile (0.1 km^{2}, (0.07%) of which is water. Part of Fort Indiantown Gap occupies the western part of the township. Lickdale is in the eastern section of the township next to Swatara Creek.

== Recreation ==
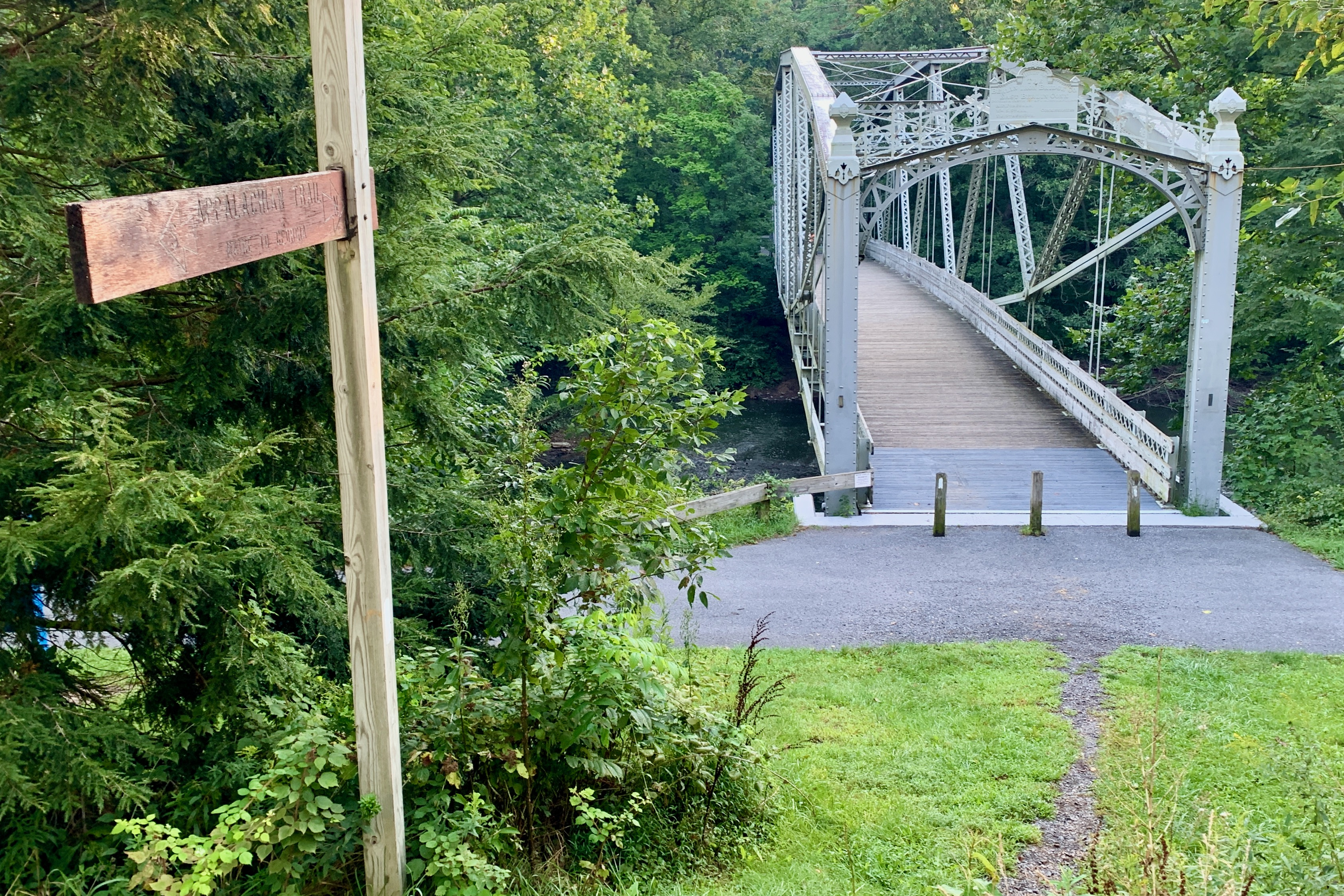
The Appalachian Trail crossing Swatara Creek on Waterville Bridge

Portions of the Appalachian Trail, Pennsylvania State Game Lands Number 80, and Swatara State Park are located along the northern part of the township.

== Demographics ==
At the 2000 census there were 2,590 people, 1,017 households, and 733 families in the township. The population density was 86.6 inhabitants per square mile (33.4/km^{2}). There were 1,105 housing units at an average density of 36.9 per square mile (14.2/km^{2}). The racial makeup of the township was 98.15% White, 0.19% African American, 0.23% Native American, 0.31% Asian, 0.35% from other races, and 0.77% from two or more races. Hispanic or Latino people of any race were 0.81%.

There were 1,017 households, 27.4% had children under the age of 18 living with them, 58.5% were married couples living together, 7.9% had a female householder with no husband present, and 27.9% were non-families. 21.7% of households were made up of individuals, and 7.4% were one person aged 65 or older. The average household size was 2.55 and the average family size was 2.94.

In the Union Township, the population was spread out, with 21.9% under the age of 18, 8.3% from 18 to 24, 29.0% from 25 to 44, 27.4% from 45 to 64, and 13.4% 65 or older. The median age was 40 years. For every 100 females, there were 104.7 males. For every 100 females age 18 and over, there were 103.9 males.

The median household income was $42,669 and the median family income was $51,157. Males had a median income of $34,758 versus $23,125 for females. The per capita income for the township was $19,896. About 5.1% of families and 6.5% of the population were below the poverty line, including 5.7% of those under age 18 and 8.3% of those age 65 or over.
