= Rausch Gap, Pennsylvania =

Ghost town in Pennsylvania, U.S.

Rausch Gap is a ghost town that is located in Cold Spring Township, Lebanon County, Pennsylvania in the United States.

== History ==
Once the largest of several coal mining towns in St. Anthony's Wilderness, this community appeared, flourished, and died during the period between 1830 and 1910. The ruins of the town are located in Cold Spring Township on the southern slopes of Sharp Mountain, where Rausch Creek cuts a gap through the mountain before entering Stony Creek, at 40°29′58″N 76°35′52″W.

While it may have been established as early as 1828, rapid growth did not occur until 1850, when the Dauphin and Susquehanna Coal Company built a railroad up the valley from the Susquehanna River to Rausch Gap.

The town became a rail center, with company offices and repair shops situated there. In 1854, the Dauphin and Susquehanna was extended eastward to Pine Grove and Auburn, as part of a planned railroad to Allentown. By 1860, the population had grown to approximately 1,000. Employment was found in the mines and railroad shops. Many train crews also resided in Rausch Gap.

Several factors then contributed to the decay and eventual demise of the town. The first of these was the closing of the mine, although some mining continued into the 1930s. The line to Allentown had never been built, and the railroad came under the control of the Philadelphia and Reading Railroad. With the completion of the Lebanon and Tremont Branch in 1870, Pine Grove became a more important point on the line. The transfer of the machine shops and company offices from Rausch Gap to Pine Grove in 1872 was the most important factor in the demise of the town.

When the railroad moved out, the town was stripped of its final purpose for existence. By the year 1875, fewer than one hundred people remained in the settlement. Sometime around 1883, most of the buildings in the town were torn down by the railroad. By 1910, all of the residents were gone.

== Today ==
All that remains today are the stone foundations of buildings and a small cemetery. Nature has taken back the land.

Rausch Gap is now one of the many stops along the Appalachian Trail. There is a shelter there for overnight campers and cold water from a spring and a decent outhouse.

== See also ==
- List of ghost towns in Pennsylvania
