= Swatara Gap =

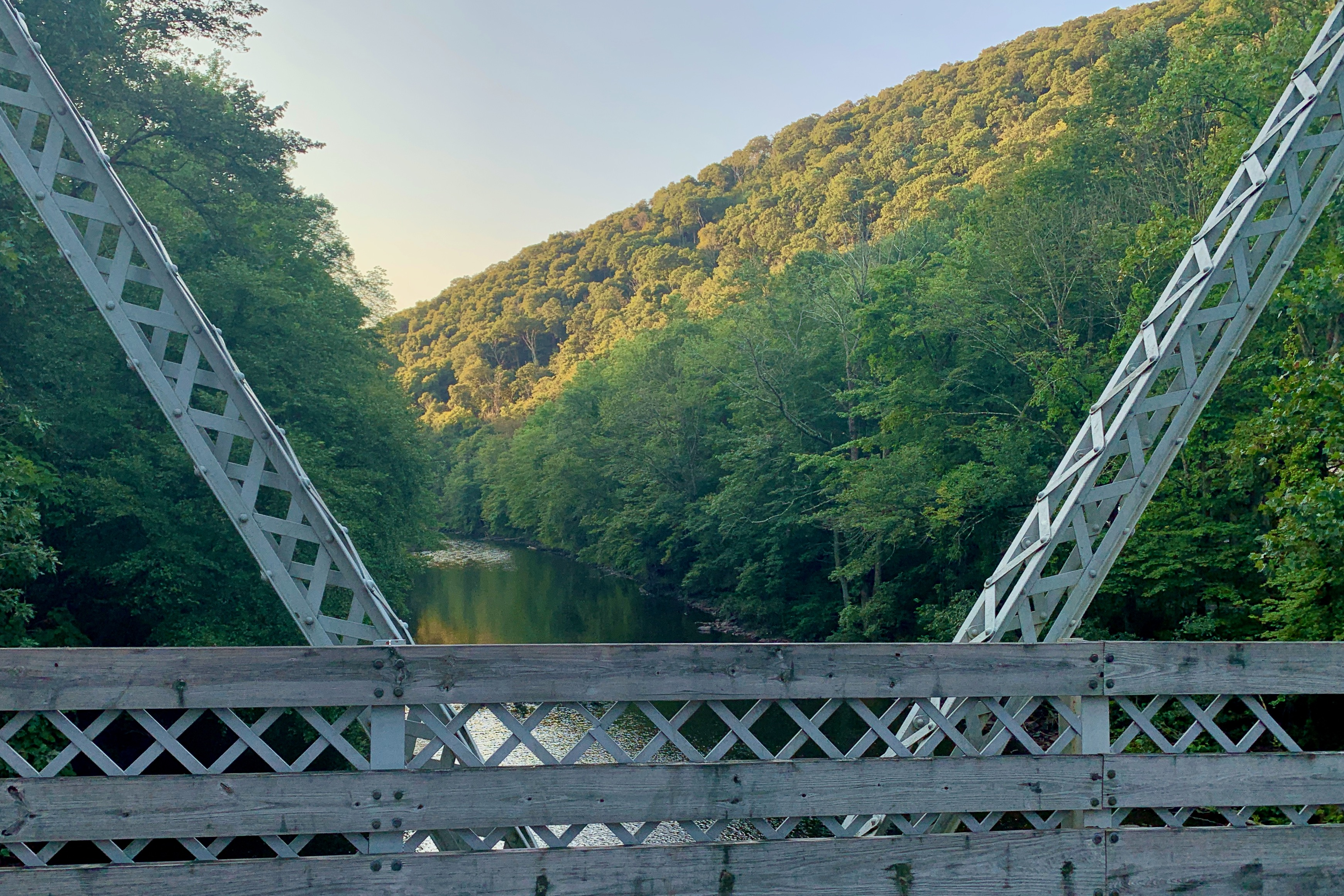
- View of Swatara Gap and Swatara Creek from the Waterville Bridge

- Location within Pennsylvania
- Elevation: 433 ft (132 m)
- Traversed by: PA 72, I-81

Location
- Range: Blue Mountain
- Coordinates: 40°28′43″N 76°31′44″W

Swatara Gap is a water gap through Blue Mountain formed by the Swatara Creek in Lebanon County, Pennsylvania. PA Route 72 as well as Interstate 81 pass through the gap. The Appalachian Trail passes through the gap over the Waterville Bridge in Swatara State Park. The area was a fossil collecting site. "Swatara" comes from a Susquehannock word, Swahadowry or Schaha-dawa, which means "where we feed on eels". Ancient Native Americans built dozens of eel-weirs, V-shaped rock barriers designed to funnel eels to facilitate capture, on the Susquehanna River and its tributaries.

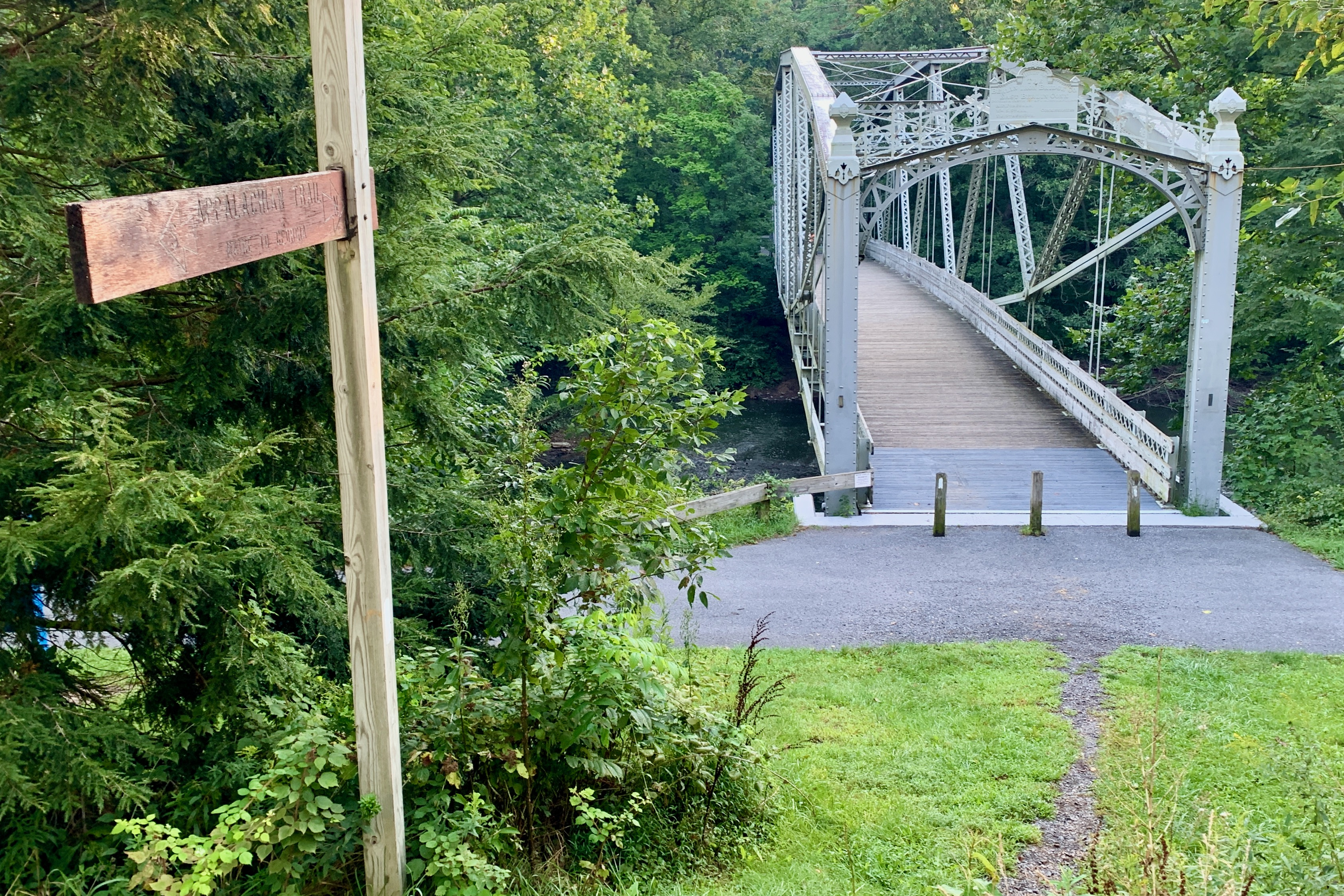
Appalachian Trail crossing Swatara Creek on the Waterville Bridge

== See also ==
- Geology of Pennsylvania
