= Allentown and Auburn Railroad =

American short-line railroad

Overview
- Headquarters: Kutztown, Pennsylvania, U.S.
- Reporting mark: ALLN
- Locale: Kutztown to Topton, Pennsylvania
- Dates of operation: 2015–present

Technical
- Track gauge: 4 ft 8 1/2 in (1,435 mm) standard gauge
- Length: 4.12 miles (6.63 km)

Other
- Website: official website

The Allentown and Auburn Railroad (reporting mark ALLN) is a short-line railroad located in the U.S. state of Pennsylvania that operates as both a freight and tourist railroad. The railroad runs between Kutztown and Topton in Berks County.

== Operations ==
The Allentown and Auburn Railroad operates both a freight railroad and a tourist railroad. The Allentown and Auburn Railroad line is 4.12 miles (6.63 km) long and runs between Kutztown and an interchange with Norfolk Southern Railway's Reading Line in Topton. The Kutztown Transportation Authority owns the tracks that the Allentown and Auburn Railroad operates on.

The tourist railroad operates out of a station in Kutztown during holidays and special occasions on the weekends. Among the occasions the railroad has operated for include an Easter train, the Kutztown Folk Festival, the Kutztown Bicentennial Celebration, Halloween trick-or-treating, Christmas tree picking, and a Santa Claus train. The Allentown & Auburn Railroad allows groups to charter an entire train for an excursion. The excursion takes between 45 minutes and an hour, passing through farmland. The Allentown & Auburn Railroad operates with a diesel locomotive, three cabooses, one coach, and an open flatcar. The diesel locomotive used by the railroad is the second oldest in service and was built in 1937. The Allentown & Auburn Railroad operated a steam locomotive for the Kutztown Bicentennial Celebration.

== History ==
=== 19th century ===
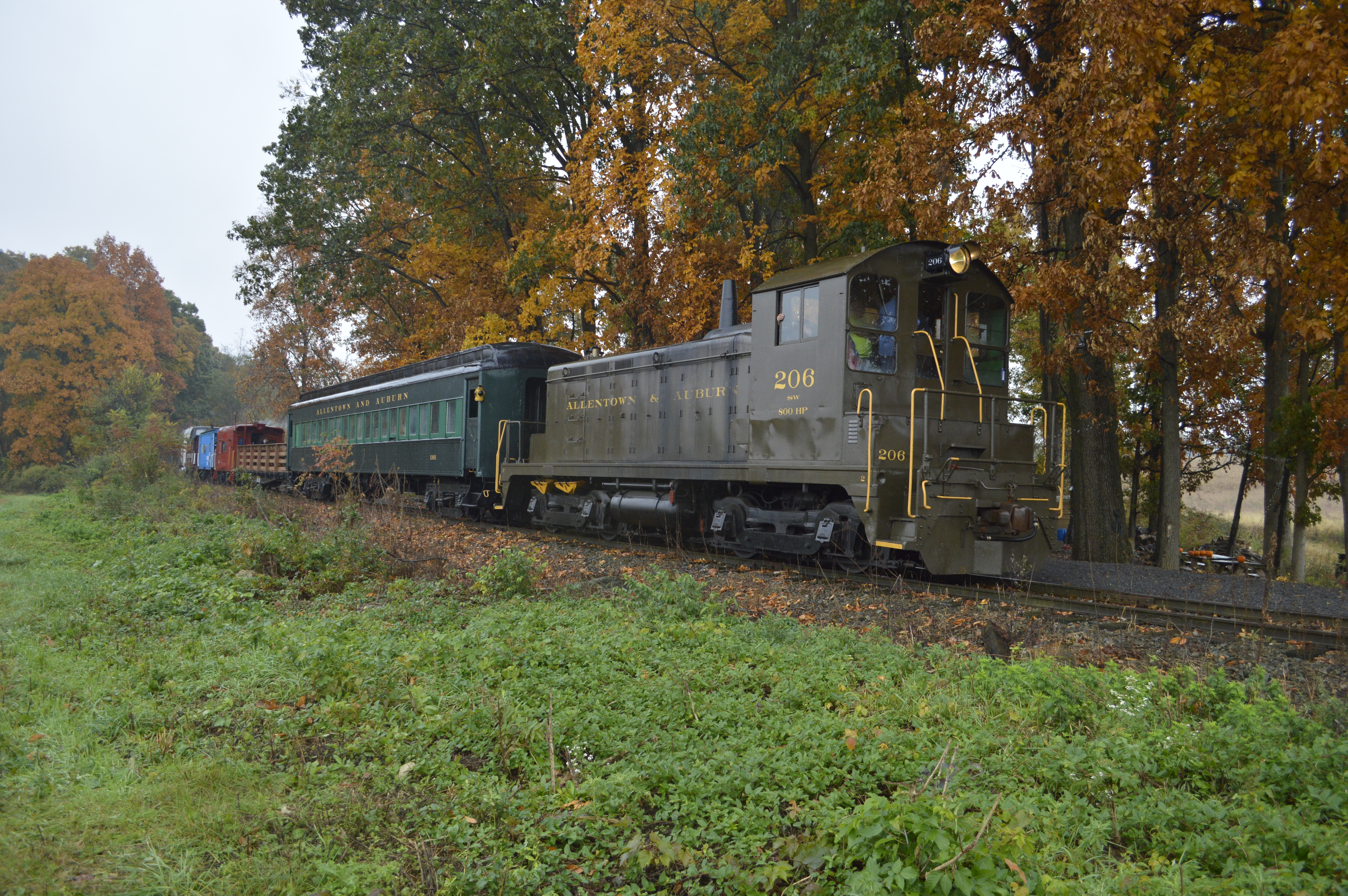
Allentown and Auburn Railroad's 206 train, an EMC Winton-engined switcher used to pull tourist trains and the occasional freight train

The Allentown and Auburn Railroad dates back to 1853 when a charter was issued to the Dauphin and Susquehanna Coal Company and the Central Railroad of New Jersey for the Allentown Railroad, a railroad that was to run from Allentown west to the Philadelphia and Reading Railway Company mainline between Port Clinton and Auburn. Construction began on the Allentown Railroad in 1855, with the railroad planned to run from Allentown southwest to Topton and then northwest through Kutztown, Virginville, and Hamburg to Port Clinton.

The CNJ was planning on abandoning the Allentown Railroad project for another route by way of Reading. The remaining investors carried on with the project. The Allentown Railroad and the Auburn & Port Clinton Railroad merged on January 1, 1857. The project was halted by the Panic of 1857 and the Dauphin and Susquehanna Coal Company was foreclosed and became part of the Philadelphia and Reading Railway Company-controlled Schuylkill and Susquehanna Railroad on April 1, 1859.

The East Pennsylvania Railroad opened on May 11, 1859, connecting Allentown and Reading. As a result, the Allentown Railroad project was abandoned as traffic could move between Allentown and Reading on the East Pennsylvania Railroad and north to Auburn along the Philadelphia and Reading Railway Company main line.

In the early 1870s, the Philadelphia and Reading Railway Company laid track along the grade of the Allentown Railroad between Kutztown and the East Pennsylvania Railroad in Topton.

=== 20th century ===
The Allentown Railroad was formally merged into the Reading Company on December 31, 1945.

Following the bankruptcy and consolidation of the Reading Co. into Conrail, the Kutztown Transportation Authority took over the line. The East Penn Railroad later operated freight service on the line between Kutztown and Topton.

=== 21st century ===
In 2013, Lindsay and Michael Bast, the latter a volunteer at the Reading Railroad Museum, took over operation of the railroad line between Kutztown and Topton after freight service on the tracks ended following the closure of a foundry.

Two years later, in March 2015, the Allentown and Auburn Railroad began tourist operations.

== Motive Power ==
=== ALLN206 ===
Built in 1937 by the Electro-Motive Corporation (EMC) for the Philadelphia, Bethlehem and New England Railroad (PBNE), #206 is a former Winton-engined SW type switcher locomotive. PBNE 206 spent time working at Bethlehem Steel in Bethlehem prior to being sold to the Steelton and Highspire Railroad (SH) in Steelton in January 1947. It was renumbered SH 23.

In the late 1950s. its original 600 hp Winston diesel engine was upgraded with an 800 hp EMD 567CR prime mover. With the upgrade, the original hood was modified to fit the larger engine while its original electrical system remained the same.

In December 1967, #23 was sold to the Maryland and Pennsylvania Railroad (MPA) and renumbered again to MPA 83. While the MPA kept #83 in service, it was mostly kept in their roundhouse due to its age. On June 27, 1986, the MPA leased #83 to the Stewartstown Railroad.

The Stewartstown Railroad purchased the locomotive months later in August 1986. Renumbering it STRT 11 to fit their roster, #11 was used for freight and passenger trains on the Northern-Central Railway trackage in New Freedom and rarely made it to Stewartstown due to deteriorating track conditions.

In 1997, #11 was moved to Jim Thorpe and used for Rail Tours Inc. Keeping its number, #11 was used as a yard switcher and for tourist trains. When Rail Tours Inc. ceased running train in 2005 #11 and most of the rest of the equipment was sold to the Reading and Northern Railroad. One year later, the Allentown and Auburn Railroad purchased the locomotive. It spent a couple of years stored in Pittston before arriving at the railroad's interchange in Topton in 2014.

Engine #11 was renumbered ALLN 206, returning it to its as build number. Still wearing its Rail Tours Inc. paint for some time, #206 received a coat of black primer just in time for the first passenger trips out of Kutztown, Pa for Easter of 2015. Soon after #206 was painted Pullman green to resemble similar engines used by the Reading Co.

1. 206 is frequently used running passenger trains from Kutztown, PA to Topon, PA and back, in addition to occasional freight transport out of Topton.

== Rolling stock ==
The ALLN has a variety of rolling stock which includes cabooses, freight cars and passengers cars. The railroad's main passenger car is ALLN1161, a 72 ft (22 m) all steel suburban coach which was built in 1927 for the Central Railroad of New Jersey, which has been used by the ALLN on almost every passenger trip since the railroad's opening in 2016. ALLN1161 is used alongside various cabooses to transport the railroad's passengers.
