= Jo Ellen Litz =

American politician and businesswoman

County Commissioner of Lebanon County
- Incumbent
- Assumed office January 2, 1996
- Preceded by: Ed Arnold

Personal details
- Born: January 1, 1951 (age 75) Cleona, Pennsylvania, U.S.
- Party: Democratic
- Spouse: Jon Litz
- Education: Lebanon Valley College; Warren National University, now Phoenix University
- Website: Official website

Jo Ellen Litz (born January 1, 1951) is an American politician, businesswoman, and member of the Democratic Party. She is serving her seventh term as a county commissioner of Lebanon County, Pennsylvania, having first won election to the county commission in 1995. Litz has also served as president (2012) and chair (2013) of the County Commissioners Association of Pennsylvania.

Litz was a candidate for Governor of Pennsylvania in the 2014 gubernatorial election. She was seeking the Democratic nomination, but did not acquire the required number of signatures on nominating petitions.

== Personal background ==
Litz was born and raised in the Borough of Cleona, Lebanon County, Pennsylvania. She married her husband, Jon, and raised two children. She was the owner of the Lebanon Body Shop, Inc. which she purchased in 1986, and managed a property that contained multiple commercial rental spaces, until a fire in 2011. She earned an associate degree from Lebanon Valley College in 1988 as an adult learner, attending classes part-time, while working full-time. She received her bachelor's degree in leadership and management in 2002 from Kennedy Western University, now Phoenix University. Litz is a member of the Fairland Brethren in Christ Church.

== Political career ==
In 1995, Litz was elected as a Lebanon County Commissioner, replacing incumbent Phil Feather. Ed Arnold succeeded her in office. In 2004, she was again elected to the seat, and has held it since that time (2004-2026). Litz captured the commissioner's seat seven times, defeating an opponent in each election. In 2010, she challenged incumbent Senator Mike Folmer who was successful in his re-election bid.

In 2013, Litz announced her bid to replace Tom Corbett as Governor of Pennsylvania. She declared her candidacy on July 2, 2013, on the steps of the Pennsylvania State Capitol in Harrisburg, Pennsylvania.

Litz was elected by her peers statewide, to serve the County Commissioner's Association of Pennsylvania as 2nd vice president in 2010, 1st vice president in 2011, president in 2012, and chair in 2013. At CCAP, she has also served as secretary to the Democratic Caucus (2008–2023). Since 2024 Litz has served as Democratic Caucus Chair. While seated as a Lebanon County Commissioner, Litz served on the Election Board (chair 2012–13) and Metropolitan Planning Organization (chair 2012–15), Assessments Appeals chair, Cedar Haven (the county nursing home), pension and salary boards, the Prison Board, and numerous other liaison boards. She was named the chair of the Lebanon County board of commissioners in 2014.

== Conservationist ==
Litz is a lifetime member and served as president (1988–2020) of the Swatara Watershed Association. She edited Swatara News, (1988-1995 and 1997–2020) and published EELS—Envisioning an Environmental Legacy for the Swatara as well as Mills and Bank Barns.

Around 1986, Litz and a group of citizens became concerned about landfills being projected close to the Swatara Creek in Schuylkill County, Pennsylvania. As a result, they formed a volunteer association known as Citizens Coordinating for Clean Water (CCCW). This group became active regarding broader aspects concerning the Swatara Creek Watershed and eventually incorporated as the Swatara Watershed Association, Inc.

Projects of CCCW and SWA include working with the Department of Conservation and Natural Resources and the PA Fish and Boat Commission to create the 60-mile long Swatara Water Trail and the restoration of Bordner Cabin, an historic hand-hewn log cabin built in 1939 by Armar Bordner (1904-1994), a high school industrial arts teacher, and his students, from locally sourced wood and stone. The Bordner Cabin is now within the borders of Swatara State Park, which took over the land where the cabin stands in the 1970s, but the state park system allowed Bordner to live there for the remainder of his life. More recently, a 33.69 acre parcel was acquired along the Swatara Creek which hosts primitive camping, fishable banks, and a canoe launch.

Litz has advocated for and championed environmental issues including farmland preservation, the Lebanon Valley Rail Trail, and increased use of renewable energy sources.
