= USS Swatara (1865) =

Wooden screw sloop in the US Navy

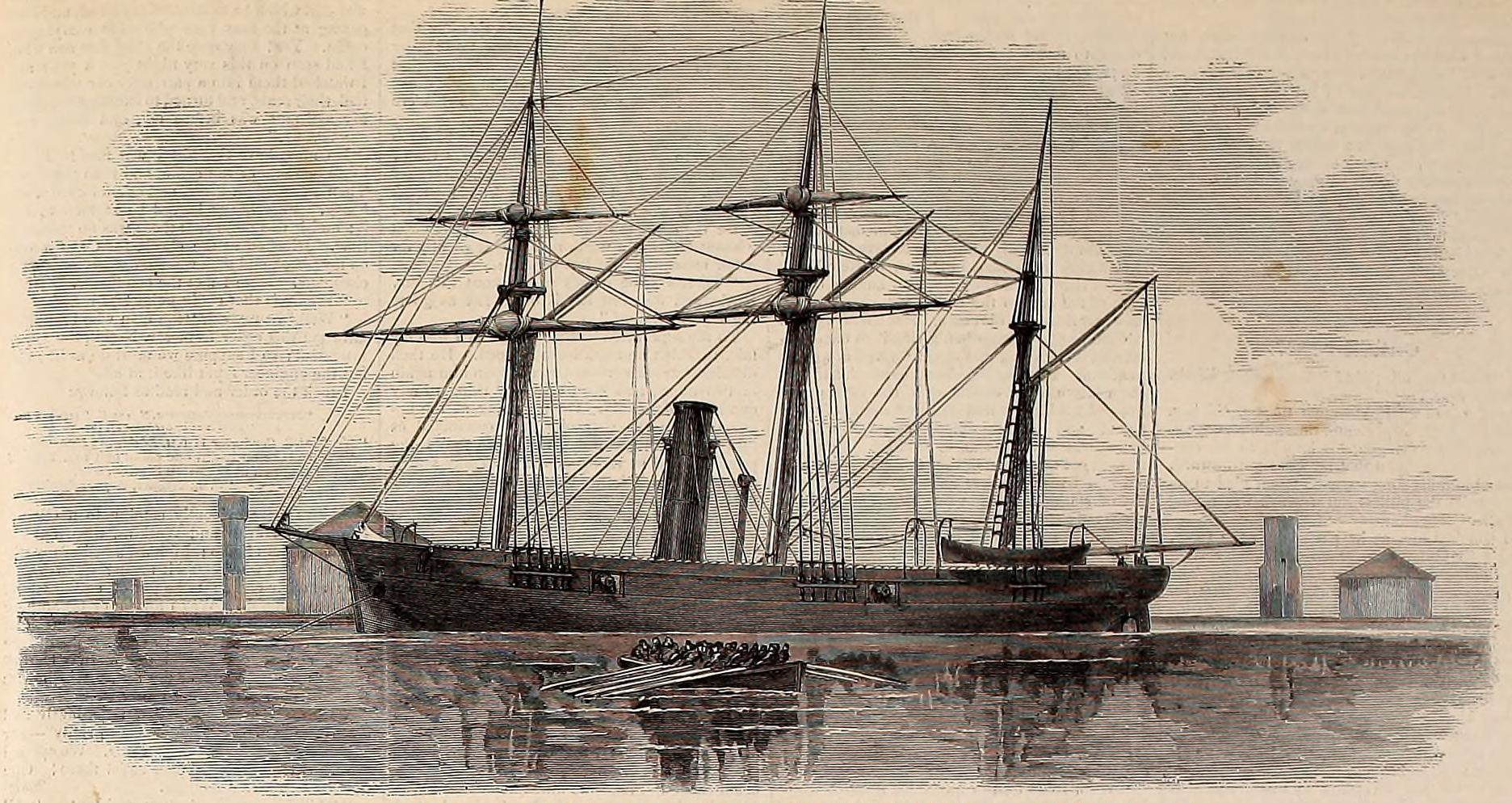
- Swatara, in 1867

History

United States
- Name: USS Swatara
- Builder: Philadelphia Navy Yard
- Launched: 23 May 1865
- Commissioned: 15 November 1865
- Decommissioned: 20 December 1871
- Fate: Dismantled and rebuilt as a new ship

General characteristics
- Type: Screw sloop
- Displacement: 1,113 long tons (1,131 t)
- Length: 216 ft (65.8 m)
- Beam: 30 ft (9.1 m)
- Draft: 13 ft (4.0 m)
- Propulsion: Steam engine
- Speed: 12 knots (22 km/h; 14 mph)
- Complement: 164 officers and enlisted
- Armament: 1 × 60-pounder gun; 6 × 32-pounder guns; 3 × 20-pounder howitzers

The first USS Swatara was a wooden, screw sloop in the United States Navy. She was named for Swatara Creek in Pennsylvania.

Swatara was launched on 23 May 1865 by the Philadelphia Navy Yard; sponsored by Miss Esther Johnson; and commissioned on 15 November 1865, Commander William Nicholson Jeffers in command.

== Service history ==
Assigned to the West Indies Squadron, Swatara stood out from Hampton Roads on 12 January 1866 for Bermuda and the West Indies. She called at various ports, including Port of Spain, Trinidad; La Guajira, Venezuela; Curaçao, Netherlands West Indies; and Havana. Departing Cuba on 1 May, Swatara arrived at the Washington Navy Yard on the 7th for repairs.

=== European Squadron, 1866–1869 ===
Departing Washington on 16 June, Swatara steamed to Norfolk, Virginia. Assigned to the European Squadron, she stood out from Hampton Roads on 27 June and called at Fayal, Azores, before arriving at Lisbon on 19 July 1866 to join flagship USS Colorado and other members of her squadron. After visiting Southampton, England, Swatara anchored at Bremerhaven, Germany, 3 August to 8 September, representing United States concern over uneasiness in Europe in the aftermath of the Austro-Prussian War. Subsequently, cruising southward, Swatara, called at Den Helder, Netherlands; Southampton, England; and the major French Atlantic seaports: Cherbourg, Brest, Lorient, Rochefort, and Bordeaux. After calling at Ferrol, Spain, Swatara arrived at Vigo on 26 October where the United States consul came on board to visit the ship on 6 November. Bound for Mediterranean duty, the sloop put into Tangier, Morocco; and Gibraltar; passing on to Spanish and French ports during November 1866.

On word that John Surratt, wanted for conspiracy in the assassination of President Abraham Lincoln, had been arrested in Rome, Swatara called at Civitavecchia, Papal States. Meanwhile, Surratt had escaped and fled to Alexandria, Egypt, where he was recaptured. Swatara arrived there on 20 December 1866, and returned with Surratt to the United States. Depositing him at the Washington Navy Yard on 18 February 1867, she returned to Lisbon.

She continued to cruise in the Mediterranean area throughout the first half of 1867, replenishing at Lisbon from 1 July to 6 August replenishing at Lisbon. Swatara headed for the Mediterranean again in August, anchoring at Smyrna and Constantinople before returning westward to Lisbon.

Swatara cruised down the West African coast in early 1868, calling at Monrovia, Liberia, on 28 February and subsequently putting in at Fernando Po and St. Paul Loanda before returning northward to Puerto Praya, Cape Verde Islands, on 27 April. After reaching Lisbon, Swatara called at Southampton on 21 May, where she underwent repairs. Subsequently, she returned to Spain.

Departing Cádiz on 17 April 1869, Swatara entered the Delaware Bay on 24 May and reached Philadelphia Navy Yard the next day. Subsequently, arriving at the New York Navy Yard on 30 May, Swatara was decommissioned there on 17 June 1869 and placed in reserve.

=== North Atlantic Squadron, 1869–1871 ===
Recommissioned on 11 November 1869 for the North Atlantic Squadron, Swatara put to sea on 27 November for Aspinwall, Colombia (later Colón, Panama). Returning to New York on 12 January, Swatara was again deployed in the Caribbean into 1871, where her principal service was protecting United States interests in Dominican waters. From February to May 1870 and from July to September 1871 she was anchored in Caldera Bay, San Domingo City, and other Dominican ports. After calling at Matanzas, Cuba, Swatara sailed via Key West and Hampton Roads to New York. She returned to the Norfolk Navy Yard where she was placed out of commission on 20 December 1871. Nominally undergoing extensive repairs, Swatara was completely dismantled and given a new hull and machinery to become, in actuality, a new ship.
