= USS Swatara (1873) =

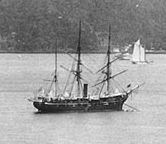
- USS Swatara rigged for mourning in 1885 at the funeral of President Ulysses S. Grant.

History

United States
- Name: USS Swatara
- Namesake: Swatara Creek in Pennsylvania
- Operator: United States Navy
- Launched: 18 September 1873
- Commissioned: 11 May 1874
- Decommissioned: 7 February 1891
- Fate: Sold for scrap, 2 November 1896
- Notes: Complete re-build of USS Swatara (1865)

General characteristics
- Type: Screw sloop
- Displacement: 1,900 long tons (1,930 t)
- Length: 216 ft (66 m)
- Beam: 37 ft (11 m)
- Draught: 16 ft 6 in (5.03 m)
- Speed: 10.2 knots (18.9 km/h; 11.7 mph)
- Complement: 230 officers and crew
- Armament: 6 × 9 in (230 mm) smoothbore guns; 1 × 8 in (200 mm) rifle; 1 × 30-pounder gun

As part of the Secretary of the Navy George M. Robeson's plans to overhaul and modernize ships of the Navy, the first USS Swatara was taken to the New York Navy Yard in 1872, ostensibly for "repairs". In fact, the "repairs" constituted construction of a new ship, for Swatara was given a new hull and unused machinery which had been in storage since 1865. Embodying only certain fittings and equipment from the first ship, the second Swatara was launched on 17 September 1873 at the New York Navy Yard and commissioned on 11 May 1874, Capt. Ralph Chandler in command.

== Service history ==
=== 1874–1878 ===
Departing New York on 8 June, Swatara transported five scientific parties to the South Pacific to observe the transit of Venus. Swatara debarked the first team at Kerguelen Island in September 1874, then at Hobart, Tasmania, on 1 October 1874 before touching at Queenstown, Tasmania; New Zealand; and Chatham Island. She returned all but one of the parties (the Kerguelen party being picked up by USS Monongahela), to Melbourne early in 1875 and eventually arrived at New York on 31 May 1875 via the Cape of Good Hope. Assigned to the North Atlantic Squadron, Swatara cruised in Atlantic and Caribbean waters into 1878. While anchored in a harbor of Pará, Brazil, on 1 December 1875, Captain of the Top Michael Deneef jumped overboard and rescued a shipmate from drowning, for which he was later awarded the Medal of Honor.

In 1877, the ship was ordered to Baltimore, Maryland along with the Powhatan, on a peacekeeping mission following the city's riots, which occurred as part of the Great Railroad Strike of 1877.

Entering the Boston Navy Yard on 1 August 1878, Swatara was decommissioned on 5 November and placed in reserve.

=== 1879–1886 ===
Swatara was recommissioned on 24 December 1879 at Boston Navy Yard and departed on 21 January 1880 for the Far East. She visited numerous Mediterranean ports and transited the Suez Canal, eventually arriving at Hong Kong on 17 April 1880. 19 May 1882 1882 – Commodore Robert W. Shufeldt, on board USS Swatara, arrives in Korea to negotiate the first commerce treaty between Korea and a Western power. The treaty is signed on 22 May, opening Korea to United States trade. Swatara called at many east Asian ports during her Asiatic Squadron duty, including long stays at Shanghai, Chefoo, and Yokohama. Departing from Yokohama on 7 July 1882, Swatara headed for home waters, via the Cape of Good Hope, and arrived at Hampton Roads on 4 December 1882 for overhaul.

Subsequently ordered to join the North Atlantic Squadron, Swatara cruised in the West Indies from January to April 1883, and arrived at Aspinwall, Colombia (now Colón, Panama), on 1 May. She sailed for Florida and reached Key West on 24 May. Ordered to the New York Navy Yard for repairs, Swatara arrived on 7 June and was ready for sea again on 23 August. After cruising off the Massachusetts coast, she was ordered southward to Port-au-Prince, Haiti. She remained in the Caribbean until April 1884, returning to Key West on 28 April. She cruised off the east coast of the United States into September, and then took part in squadron maneuvers in Narragansett Bay.

During September 1885, escorted by USS Yantic, she transported a cargo of gold bullion from New Orleans to Washington, D.C. In early 1886, she was assigned hydrographic duties fixing locations on the Puerto Rican coast. After subsequently cruising as far north as Halifax, Nova Scotia, Swatara arrived at the Portsmouth Navy Yard, Portsmouth, N.H., where she was decommissioned on 27 October 1886.

=== 1888–1896 ===
Recommissioned there on 1 March 1888, Swatara was assigned to the South Atlantic Squadron. She visited Argentine and Uruguayan ports before putting into Port Stanley, Falkland Islands, on 8 January 1889. Reassigned to the Asiatic Squadron, Swatara departed from Port Stanley on 11 March 1889 for Cape Horn and the Pacific. Arriving at Hong Kong, Swatara departed on 23 November to visit Chinese and Japanese ports. Remaining on the Asiatic station into the following year, Swatara was flagship for Rear Admiral George Belknap, Commander-in-Chief, Asiatic Fleet, from 4 October 1890 until the ship was ordered home later in the month. Swatara stood out from Yokohama harbor on 29 October and arrived at San Francisco on 30 November. Subsequently, transferred to the Mare Island Navy Yard on 6 December, Swatara was decommissioned there on 7 February 1891.

Designated "in ordinary" at Mare Island, Swatara's battery was landed, and she remained inactive into 1896. Ordered sold by an act dated 10 June 1896, Swatara was struck from the Navy list on 29 July and sold at public auction on 2 November to the Johnson Wrecking Co. of San Francisco, Calif., for scrapping.
