= Michael Deneef =

- Born: 1851; Massachusetts, US
- Died: January 28, 1891 (aged 39–40)
- Military career
- Allegiance: United States
- Branch: United States Navy
- Rank: Captain of the Top
- Unit: USS Swatara
- Awards: Medal of Honor

Michael Deneef (1851–1891) was a United States Navy sailor and a recipient of the United States military's highest decoration, the Medal of Honor.

== Biography ==
Born in 1851 in Massachusetts, Deneef joined the Navy from that state as an apprentice boy. He later served as captain of the top on the USS Swatara. On the morning of December 1, 1875, Swatara was anchored in a harbor of Pará, Brazil, when the ship's dinghy capsized. A strong tidal current swept the dinghy backwards from the side of the ship, where it had first capsized. One of the dinghy's crew initially grabbed onto the small boat, but then lost his grip and began to sink. Deneef jumped overboard from Swatara's gangway, swam to the drowning man, and dragged him back to the dinghy, where they were later picked up by a cutter. For this action, Deneef was awarded the Medal of Honor a month later, on January 18, 1876.

== Medal of Honor citation ==
Deneef's official Medal of Honor citation reads:

On board the U.S.S. Swatara at Para, Brazil, 1 December 1875. Displaying gallant conduct, Deneef jumped overboard and rescued one of the crew of that vessel from drowning.

== See also ==
- List of Medal of Honor recipients during peacetime
