= Swatara Creek =

River in Pennsylvania

Coordinates: 40°11′5″N 76°43′56″W

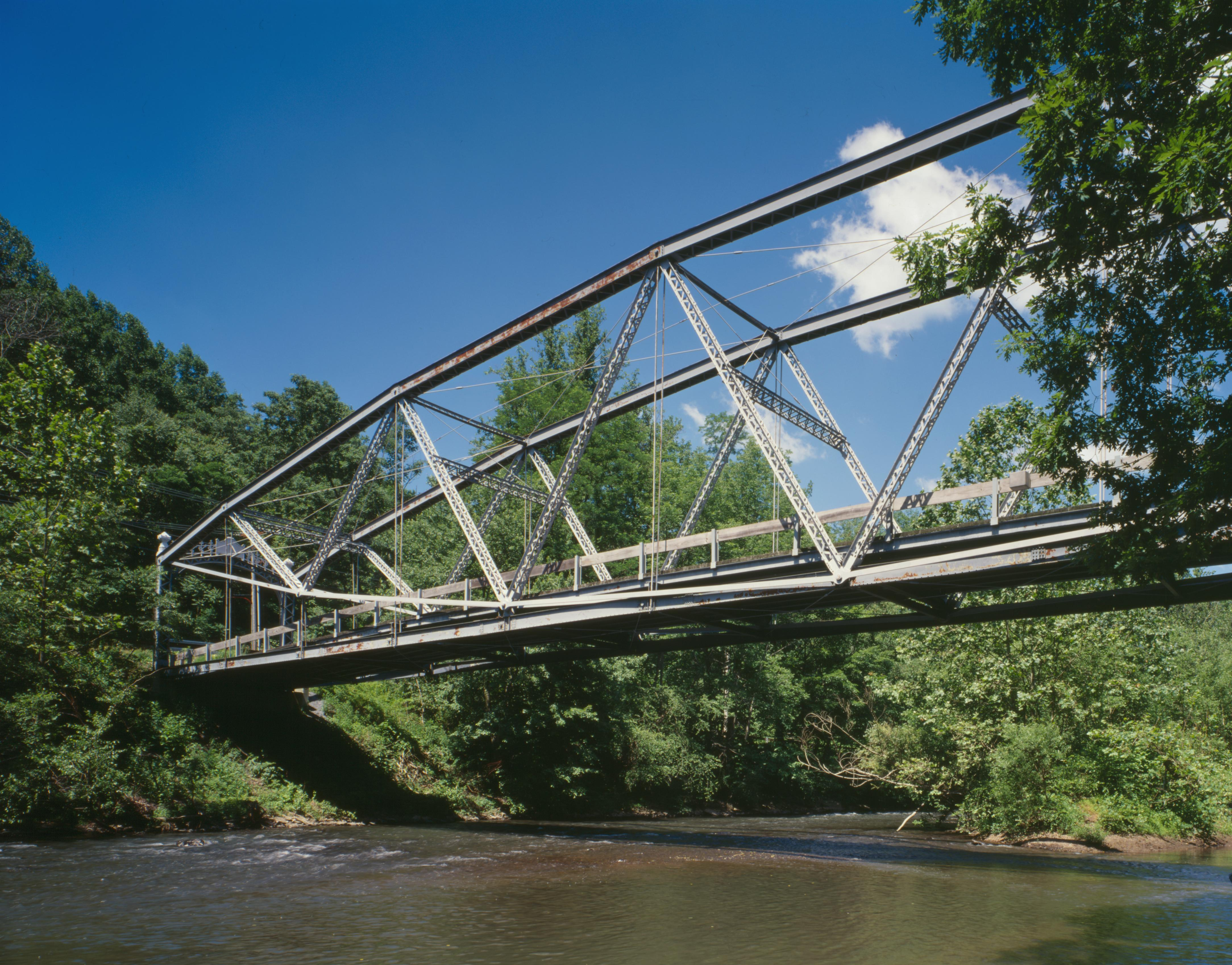
- Waterville Bridge over Swatara Creek

- Location within Pennsylvania
- Nickname: Swatty

Location
- State: Pennsylvania

Physical characteristics
- Mouth: Susquehanna River
- Length: 72 miles (116 km)

Swatara Creek (nicknamed the Swatty) is a 72-mile-long (116 km) tributary of the Susquehanna River in east-central Pennsylvania in the United States. It rises in the Appalachian Mountains in central Schuylkill County and passes through northwest Lebanon County before draining into the Susquehanna at Middletown in Dauphin County.

The name "Swatara" is said to derive from a Susquehannock word, Swahadowry or Schaha-dawa, which means "where we feed on eels". Ancient Native Americans built dozens of eel-weirs, V-shaped rock barriers designed to funnel eels to facilitate capture, on the Susquehanna and its tributaries.

== Geography ==
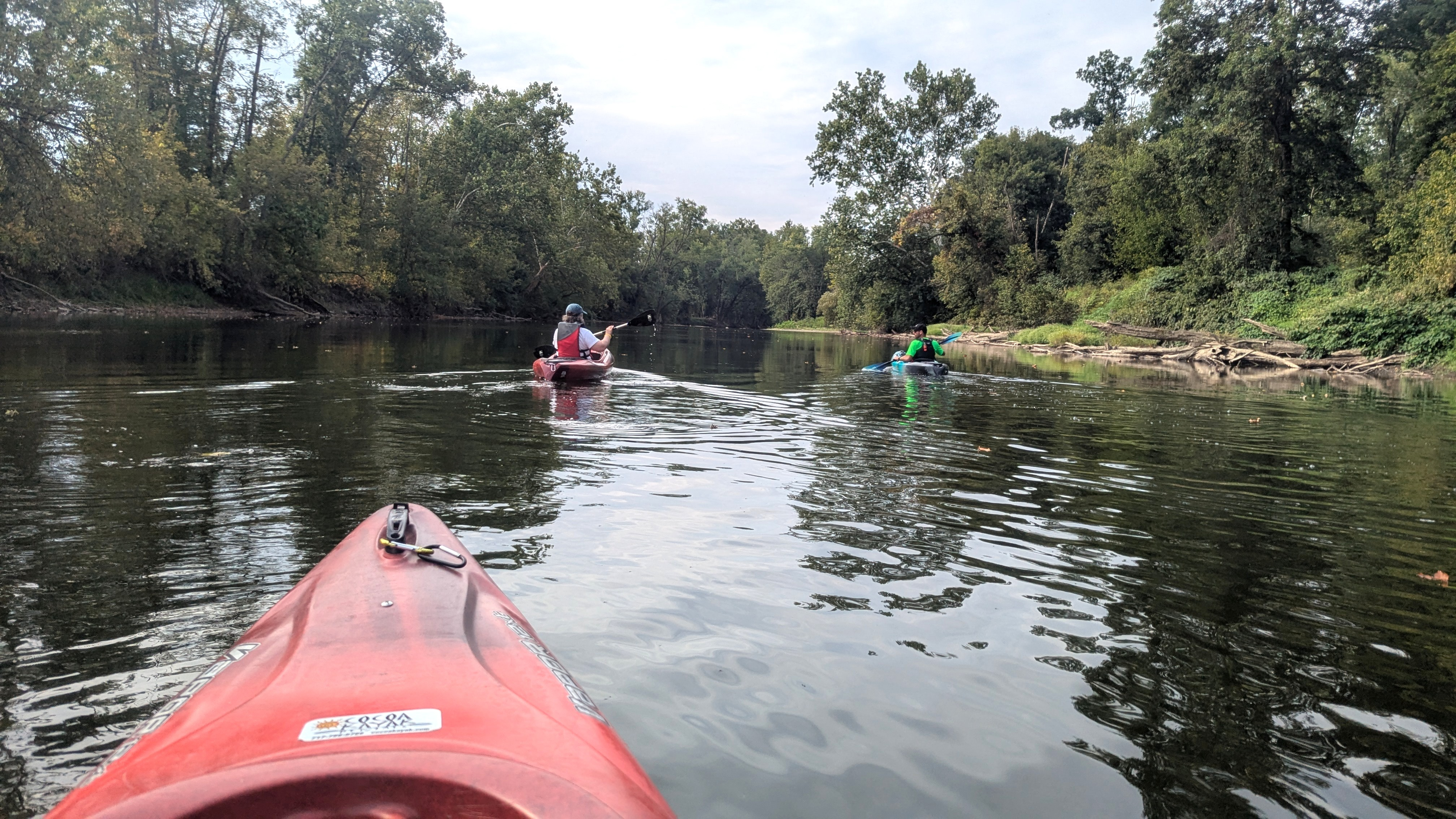
Kayaking on Swatara Creek, North of Hershey, Pennsylvania (2025)

Swatara Creek rises in the Appalachian Mountains in central Schuylkill County, on Broad Mountain north of the Sharp Mountain ridge, approximately 5 miles (8 km) west of Minersville. It flows southwest in a winding course, passing south of Tremont, then cutting south through the ridges of Sharp Mountain and Second Mountain. It passes through Swatara State Park then turns south to pass through Swatara Gap in the Blue Mountain ridge northwest of Lebanon. After emerging from the ridge the creek flows southwest, north of Hershey, past Hummelstown, and joins the Susquehanna at Royalton, in Middletown. It receives Quittapahilla Creek from the east 3 mi (4.8 km) north of Palmyra.

== History ==
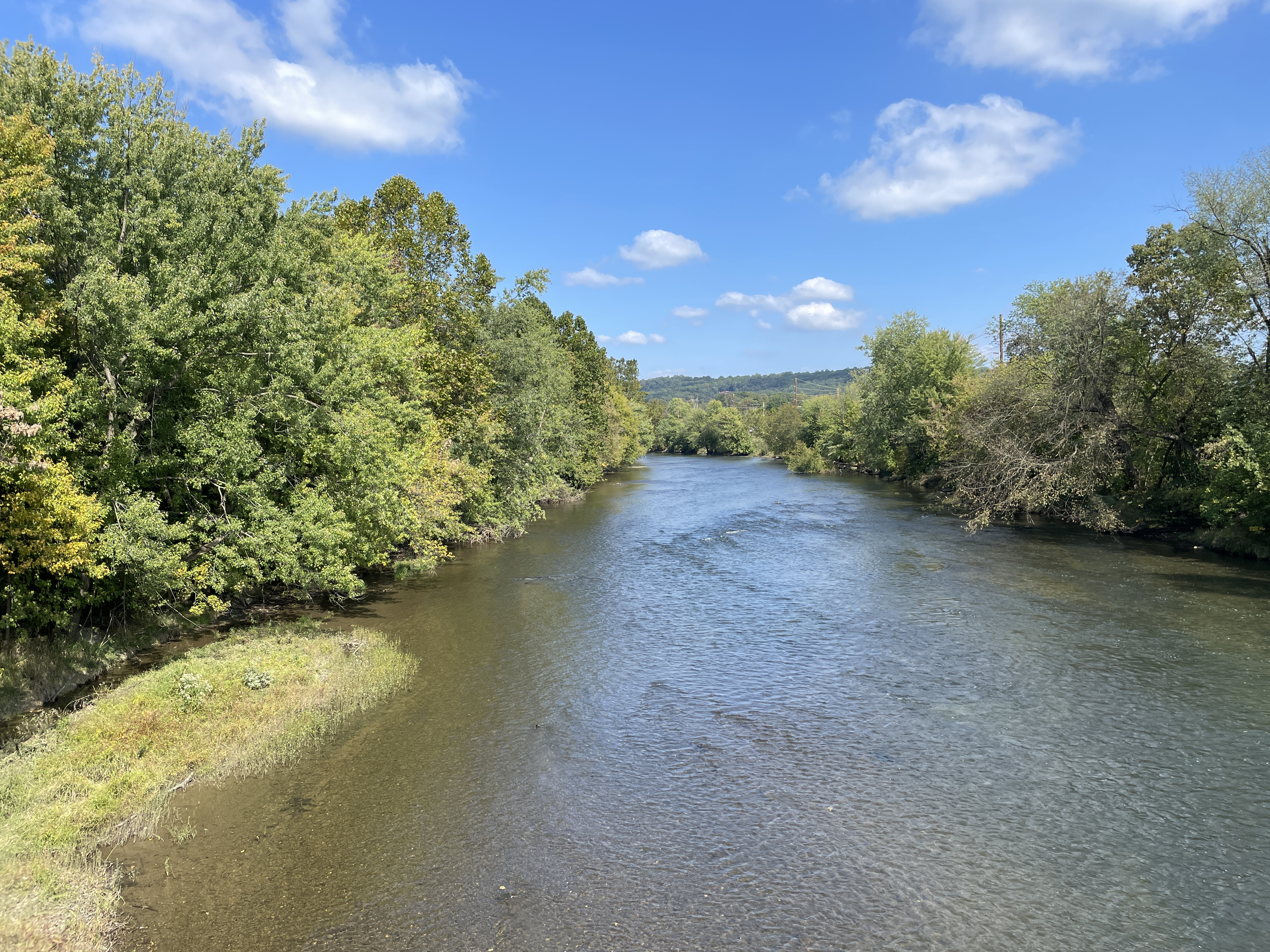
Swatara Creek in Middletown

The creek was a significant transportation route in the colonial period of North America up through the late 19th century. A canal linking the Susquehanna and Delaware valleys in southeastern Pennsylvania was first proposed in 1690 by William Penn, the founder of the Pennsylvania Colony. Nearly a century passed before a route for the canal was surveyed by David Rittenhouse and William Smith between 1762 and 1770, the first canal ever surveyed in the United States. Spurred by the 1791 discovery of anthracite in the upper Susquehanna Valley, the Pennsylvania General Assembly chartered two companies to undertake the project: the Schuylkill and Susquehanna Navigation Company and the Delaware and Schuylkill Navigation Company. At the time of the initial construction in 1792, Philadelphia was involved in an intense rivalry with Baltimore, Maryland, for supremacy as a shipping port. The canal was backed by Philadelphia businessmen as a means to divert commercial traffic from following the Susquehanna downriver to the Chesapeake Bay, its more natural destination. Although the Schuylkill and Susquehanna Navigation Company project failed for lack of funds, the project was restarted and ultimately completed by its successor company, the Union Canal in 1828.

From west to east, the route of the Schuylkill and Susquehanna Navigation Company canal in 1792 was to follow Swatara Creek upstream from Middletown to Quittapahilla Creek, which it then followed upstream past Lebanon and Myerstown to its headwaters. It then crossed overland to Clarks Run at the headwaters of Tulpehocken Creek, following Tulpehocken Creek downstream to Reading on the Schuylkill River. It was to follow the Schuylkill downriver to the Delaware River at Philadelphia. The route of the Union Canal followed the same route up Swatara Creek and continued up the creek to Union Water Works. The canal then went up Clarks Run to the summit and thence by a 729-foot (222 m) tunnel over to Lebanon. The upper course above Union Water Works into the mountains provided the route of a feeder to the main canal, as well as providing a route to ship anthracite from the mountains to Philadelphia.

On September 8, 2011, the creek reached a record height of 26.8 feet (8.2 m) near Hershey, following devastating rains from Tropical Storm Lee and remnants of Hurricane Irene, the highest since measurements began in 1975. Farther upstream at the Harpers Tavern gauge, 24.6 feet (7.5 m) was recorded, making it the worst flooding since 1889. The flooding caused thousands of people to be evacuated from their homes throughout central Pennsylvania, and at least one death.

Several covered bridges once crossed Swatara Creek, including the Fiddler's Elbow Covered Bridge, built 1862, near Hummelstown and Clifton Covered Bridge, built 1870, near Middletown, both destroyed by Hurricane Agnes in 1972. The Sand Beach Covered Bridge burned down in 1966 by arson.

== Recreation ==
Today, Swatara Creek is part of a national and statewide water trail system, providing outdoor recreation for families canoeing and kayaking a 60-mile (97 km) segment that connects to the Susquehanna River and Captain John Smith water trails.

== Drinking water ==
Three water companies — Suez Water Pennsylvania, American Water, and the Lebanon Water Authority — draw drinking water for hundreds of thousands of residents of the Swatara watershed.

== Tributaries ==
- Iron Run
- Beaver Creek
- Spring Creek
- Manada Creek
- Quittapahilla Creek
- Brandywine Creek
- Bow Creek
- Indiantown Run
- Little Swatara Creek
- Lower Little Swatara Creek
- Upper Little Swatara Creek
- Good Spring Creek

== Ships ==
Two ships in the United States Navy have been named USS Swatara after the creek:

- The first USS Swatara (1865) was a wooden, screw sloop, launched in 1865 and dismantled in 1872 to become the second ship of this name.
- The second USS Swatara (1873) was a screw sloop, launched in 1873 and decommissioned in 1891.

== See also ==
- List of rivers of Pennsylvania
