= Windsor Castle, Pennsylvania =

Unincorporated community in Pennsylvania, US

- Unincorporated community
- Location within Pennsylvania
- Coordinates: 40°32′21″N 75°56′0″W
- Country: United States
- State: Pennsylvania
- County: Berks
- Township: Windsor
- Elevation: 479 ft (146 m)
- Time zone: UTC-5 (Eastern (EST))
  - Summer (DST): UTC-4 (EDT)
- Area codes: 610 and 484
- GNIS feature ID: 1191582

Windsor Castle is an unincorporated community in Windsor Township in Berks County, Pennsylvania, United States. Windsor Castle is located at the intersection of Windsor Castle Road, Haas Road, and Zion Church Road.
