= Waterville Bridge =

- U.S. National Register of Historic Places
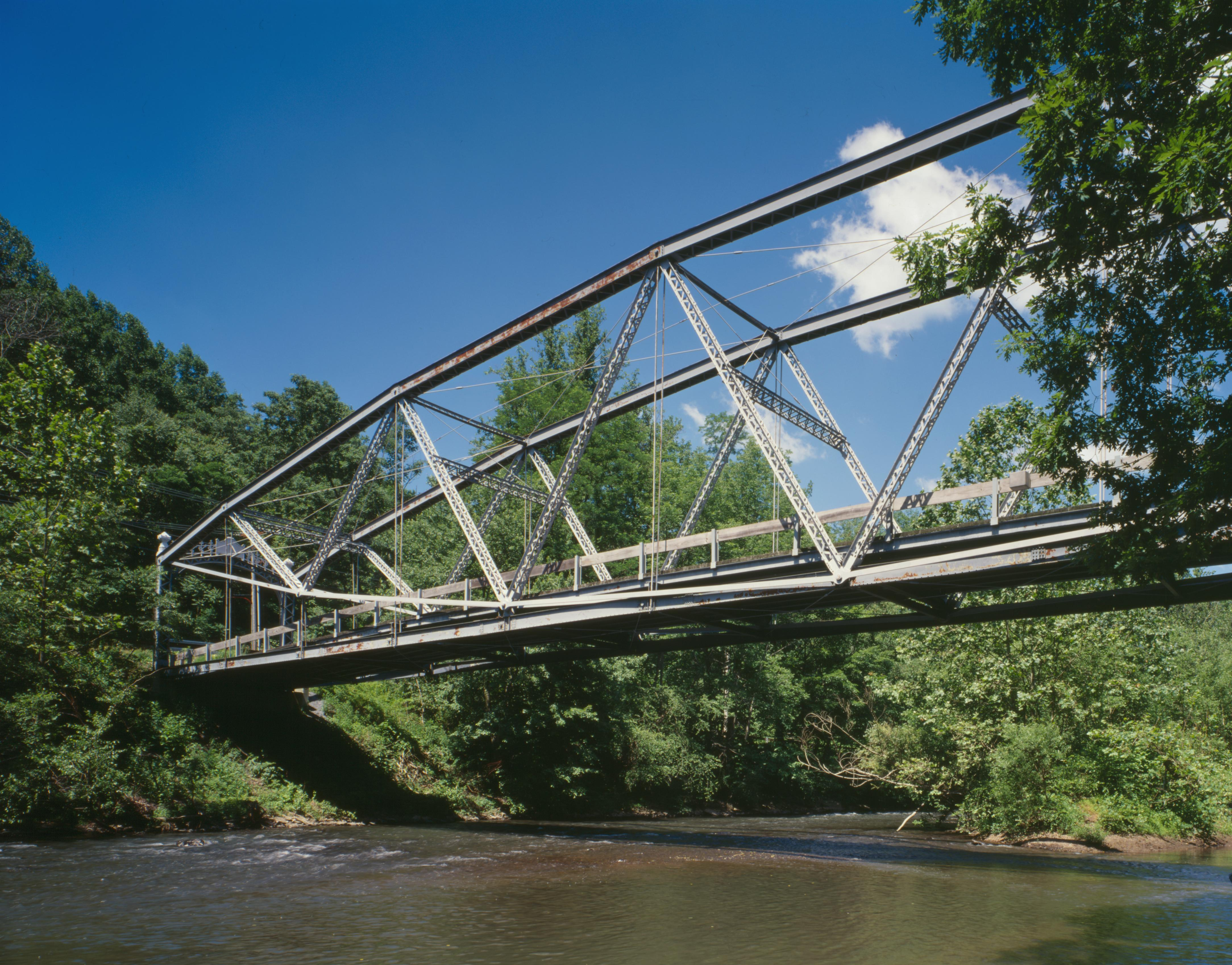

- Location within Pennsylvania Location within the United States
- Location: Appalachian Trail over Swatara Creek, Swatara Gap, Pennsylvania
- Coordinates: 40°28′49″N 76°31′55″W
- Area: less than one acre
- Built: 1890
- Architect: Berlin Iron Bridge Co.
- Architectural style: Lenticular truss
- MPS: Highway Bridges Owned by the Commonwealth of Pennsylvania, Department of Transportation TR
- NRHP reference No.: 88002171
- Added to NRHP: November 14, 1988

The Waterville Bridge is a lenticular truss bridge designed and manufactured by the Berlin Iron Bridge Co. It was built in 1890.

It was relocated from Waterville, Lycoming County, Pennsylvania, to Swatara State Park in Lebanon County, Pennsylvania, in 1985.

It was listed on the National Register of Historic Places in 1988.

== Gallery ==
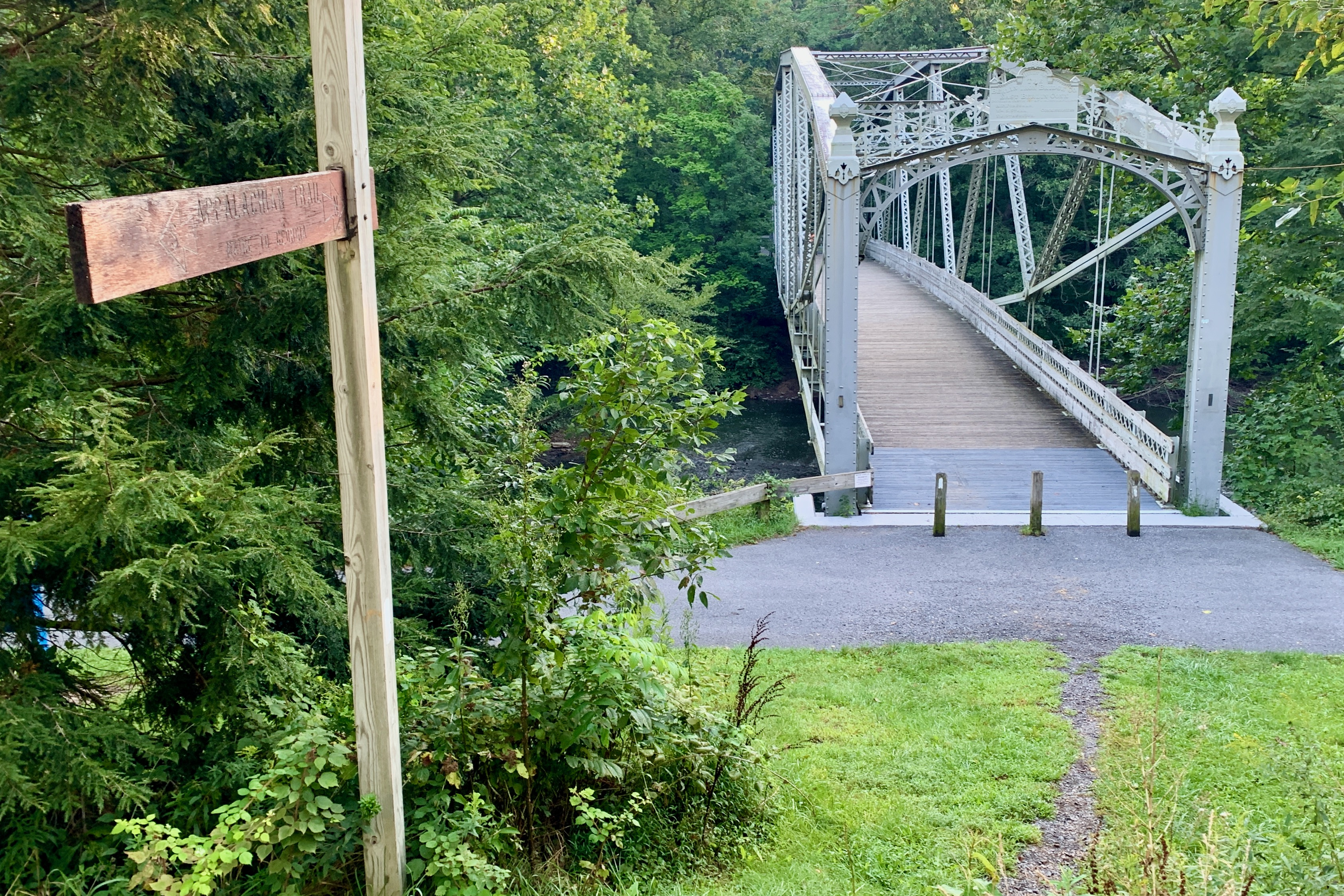
The Appalachian Trail crossing over the bridge.

== See also ==
- List of bridges documented by the Historic American Engineering Record in Pennsylvania
