= Lower Little Swatara Creek =

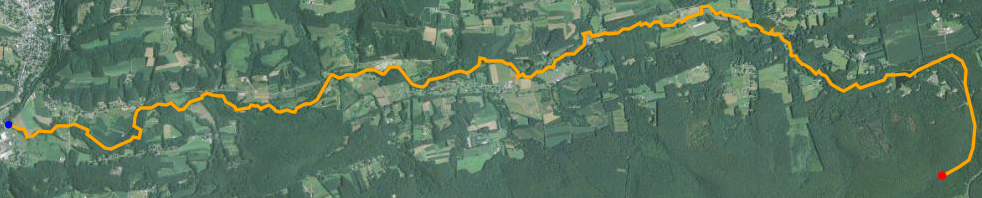

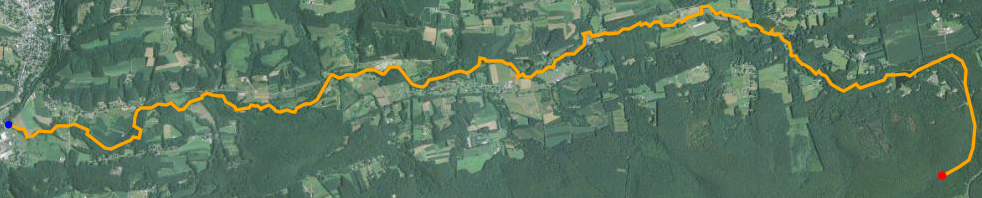
- Satellite map of Lower Little Swatara Creek. The red dot is the stream's source and blue dot is its mouth.

Physical characteristics
- Source
  - location: Blue Mountain, Wayne Township, Schuylkill County, Pennsylvania
  - coordinates: 40.5302°N 76.2281°W
- Mouth
  - location: Swatara Creek near Pine Grove, Schuylkill County, Pennsylvania
  - coordinates: 40.5373°N 76.3886°W
- Length: 11 mi (18 km)
- Basin size: 34 sq mi (88 km^{2})

Basin features
- River system: Susquehanna River system

Lower Little Swatara Creek is a tributary of Swatara Creek in southern Schuylkill County, Pennsylvania, US. The creek is 11 miles (18 km) long. The creek starts on Blue Mountain and flows west-southwest into Swatara Creek near the community of Pine Grove. Fishing and canoeing are the primary recreational activities on the creek. Significant amounts of phosphorus and sediment flow through the creek.

== Course ==
Lower Little Swatara Creek starts on the northern slopes of Blue Mountain in Wayne Township, near the Schuylkill/Berks county line. The creek flows northwest to the community of Moyers, at which point it turns west-southwest into Washington Township. As the creek enters Washington Township, parallels Blue Mountain, as well as briefly paralleling Summer Hill. It picks up two tributaries from the south, then one from the northeast, then one each from the south and north. The creek's valley gets wider as it flows out of Washington Township and into Pine Grove Township. As it enters the township, it flows between Swope Mountain to the south and Swatara Hill to the north. The creek passes by the communities of Marstown and Crowtown, as well as a sewage disposal station. At this point, the creek empties into Swatara Creek.

=== Tributaries ===
Lower Little Swatara Creek has several tributaries. Three of them are unnamed.

== Geography ==
Lower Little Swatara Creek is in the ridge and valley province's Appalachian Mountain Section. The headwaters of Lower Little Swatara Creek are 1,040 feet (320 m) higher in elevation than its mouth.

== Geology ==
The Shawangunk Formation is one of the main types of rock formations in the Lower Little Swatara Creek watershed. This formation occurs in the southern part of the watershed, on Blue Mountain. Slightly further north is the Bloomsburg Formation, which occupies the northern edge of Blue Mountain. The Hamilton Group is north of the Bloomsburg Formation. The Hamilton Group occupies the central region of the watershed, including the Lower Little Swatara Creek valley. The Trimmers Rock Formation is another formation in the creek's watershed. It occupies the area north of Lower Little Swatara Creek itself. A rock formation known as the Walcksville and Towanmensing Member occurs in a small band north of the Trimmers Rock Formation. The Beaverdam Run Member formation occurs on the edges of the watershed of the largest tributary of the creek. The Long Run Member formation occurs around this creek itself.

There are several main types of soil in the Lower Little Swatara Creek watershed. They are the Berks-Weikert-Beddington, the Leck Kill-Minersville-Calvin, and the Hazleton-Dechaub-Buchanon. The Hazleton-Dechaub-Buchanon soil occurs in most of the southern part of the watershed. The Leck Kill-Minersville-Calvin soil occurs in the east-central part of the watershed, including the upper part of the Lower Little Swatara Creek valley, and also the northeastern corner. The Berks-Weikert-Beddington occurs in the lower part of the creek's valley, as well as most of the watershed north of the valley.

== Watershed ==
Lower Little Swatara Creek has a watershed that is 34 square miles in area. 64% of the land in the watershed is agricultural land. 29% of the land is covered by forest and 7% of the land is developed.

In particular, the watershed of Lower Little Swatara Creek contains 2901 acres of hay or pastures. The watershed contains 1378.8 acres of cropland and 1912.6 acres of forest. There are 430 acres of low-intensity development, 37.1 acres of land in transition, and 4.9 acres of wetland.

== Hydrology ==
The amount of sediment flowing through Lower Little Swatara Creek is 8,182.2887 pounds (3,711.4237 kg) per day. This is approximately 1.89 times the total maximum daily load for the creek. The amount of phosphorus flowing through Lower Little Swatara Creek is 7.4658 pounds (3.3864 kg) per day. This is approximately 1.78 times the total maximum daily load.

Out of the sediment that flows through Lower Little Swatara Creek, 6,241 pounds (2,831 kg) per day comes from agricultural land. 762.6723 pounds (345.9423 kg) per day comes from streambanks, 690.7397 pounds (313.3143 kg) per day comes from pastures and similar land, and 456.274 pounds (206.962 kg) per day comes from developed land. A total of 31.3425 pounds (14.2167 kg) per day comes from forests.

Out of the phosphorus that flows through Lower Little Swatara Creek, 3.9943 pounds (1.8118 kg) per day comes from agricultural land. 1.509 pounds (0.684 kg) comes from pastures and similar land. 1.574 pounds (0.714 kg) per day comes from groundwater, 0.2442 pounds (110.8 g) per day comes from developed land, and 0.095 pounds (43 g) per day comes from septic systems. A total of 0.0324 pounds (14.7 g) per day comes from forests, 0.0168 pounds (7.6 g) comes from streambanks, and 0.0001 pounds (0.045 g) per day comes from wetlands. In Lower Little Swatara Creek, dissolved phosphorus makes up 25% to 33% of the total phosphorus concentration and phosphorus in sediment makes up 67% to 75%, as of 1985.

Lower Little Swatara Creek's outflow into Swatara Creek helps dilute acid mine drainage in Swatara Creek.

The maximum concentration of manganese in the waters of Lower Little Swatara Creek 670 micrograms per liter, as of 1985. The median concentration of iron in the waters of the creek was 850 micrograms per liter as of 1985. The concentration of dissolved iron in the creek near Pine Grove was 85 micrograms per liter.

== History and name ==
"Swatara" comes from a Susquehannock word, Swahadowry or Schaha-dawa, which means "where we feed on eels". Ancient Native Americans built dozens of eel-weirs, V-shaped rock barriers designed to funnel eels to facilitate capture, on the Susquehanna River and its tributaries.

There was a gauging station on Lower Little Swatara Creek from 1936 to 1953. The Pennsylvania Department of Environmental Protection conducted a public TMDL meeting for Lower Little Swatara Creek for the first time on June 16, 2010, making it one of the first public TMDL meetings in the state.

=== Recreation ===
It is possible to navigate Lower Little Swatara Creek in a canoe. The Pennsylvania Fish and Boat Commission also stocks trout in some areas of the creek. Public fishing is permitted on the creek.

== See also ==
- Little Swatara Creek
