= Swatara State Park =

State park in the U.S. state of Pennsylvania

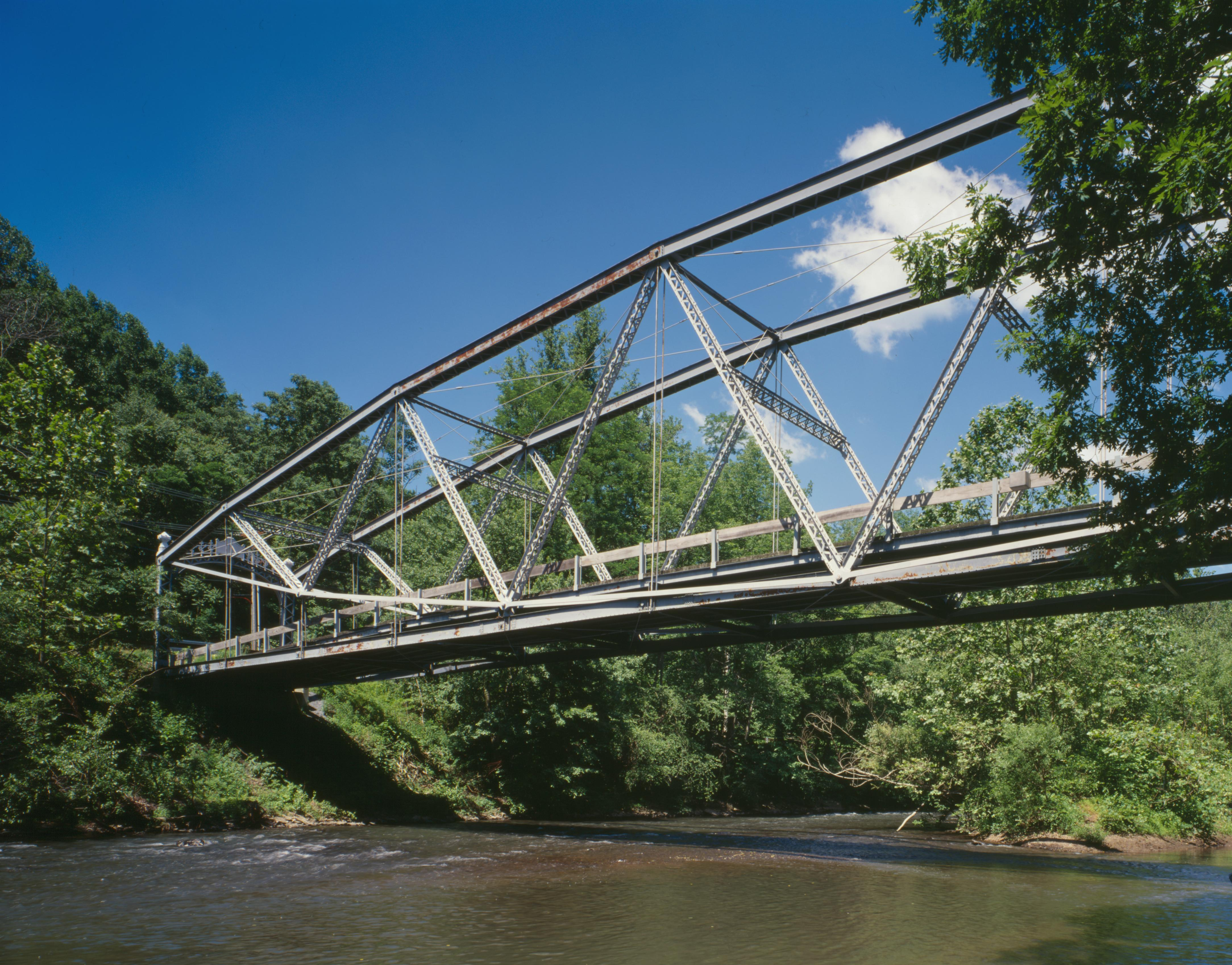
- The Appalachian Trail crosses Swatara Creek on the historic Waterville Bridge in the park

- Location within Pennsylvania Location within the United States
- Interactive map of Swatara State Park
- Location: Lebanon and Schuylkill counties, Pennsylvania, United States
- Coordinates: 40°28′59″N 76°32′44″W
- Area: 3,520 acres (1,420 ha)
- Elevation: 502 feet (153 m)
- Established: 1987
- Administrator: Pennsylvania Department of Conservation and Natural Resources
- Website: Official website
- Pennsylvania State Parks

Swatara State Park is a 3,520-acre (1,420 ha) Pennsylvania state park in Bethel, Swatara and Union townships, Lebanon County and Pine Grove Township, Schuylkill County in Pennsylvania in the United States. 8 miles (13 km) of Swatara Creek lie within the park's boundaries, which are roughly formed by Pennsylvania Route 443 to the north and Interstate 81 to the south. The park is in a valley in the ridge and valley region of Pennsylvania between Second Mountain (north) and Blue Mountain (south).

Swatara State Park is a fairly new park for the Commonwealth of Pennsylvania. It was opened in 1987 and is still largely undeveloped. The Pennsylvania Department of Conservation and Natural Resources is working on plans to further develop the lands of Swatara State Park. The original plans called for the building of a dam and reservoir for recreational fishing and boating as well as to provide drinking water for the City of Lebanon. The PADCNR explored plans for developing the park without the recreational lake/reservoir, and in 2012 started developing the park with infrastructure improvements to increase access to biking, hiking, canoeing, fishing and picnicking opportunities in the park. Improvements include installing 10 miles of crushed stone along the rail-trail and work on abandoned Old State Road.

== History ==
=== Susquehannock Indians ===
The early history of Swatara State Park is tied to the Susquehannock people, Native Americans that once inhabited the ridge and valley region of Pennsylvania. This region of Pennsylvania is very mountainous, with the mountains located in close proximity to each other with narrow valleys between. Swatara Creek is in one of these valleys. The Susquehannock used it as a transportation route.

=== Coal and canals ===
This region of Pennsylvania was first settled by Europeans in the 1750s. Anthracite coal was soon discovered in the area of Tremont. Coal mines were opened and by the 1820s the demand for coal was such that a canal was built to connect the Susquehanna River with the Schuylkill River. This canal was known as the Union Canal. It stretched from Middletown on the Susquehanna through Lebanon and to Reading on the Schuylkill River. A 672-acre (272 ha) reservoir was built on the land that is now Swatara State Park. A branch canal was built from Lebanon through Pine Grove and on to the reservoir. This canal provided water for the main branch of the Union Canal. Barges filled with anthracite coal traveled down the canal to the industrial centers of central Pennsylvania. The dam holding the reservoir was washed away in the Flood of 1862. The dam was never rebuilt and the branch canal was never reopened. The Union Canal was closed in 1885, as did most canals during this era as they simply could not compete with the efficiency of the railroads. Remains of the dam and five canal locks can still be seen on the grounds of Swatara State Park, providing an example of how nature has taken back some of the land that was used during central Pennsylvania's industrial past.

=== Railroads to Bike Trails ===
Swatara State Park's Rail Trail, a bike trail, follows the old railroad bed of the Lebanon & Tremont Branch of the Reading Railroad. This branch connected the West End coalfields of Schuylkill County with the town of Lebanon, paralleling the derelict branch canal below Pine Grove. The railroad was dominant in transportation until the 1960s when Interstate 81 was completed. The branch was abandoned east of Suedberg in 1965, and the remainder between 1978 and 1981. Conrail abandoned the line, with the former roadbed being transferred to the state.

== Recreation ==
=== Fishing ===
The waters of Swatara Creek were heavily polluted by runoff from the coal mines and sewage from the nearby municipalities. Over the years the water quality has gradually improved and there are now some fish living in the waters of Swatara Creek. Smallmouth bass and panfish can be caught in Swatara Creek. Irving's Pond is the home to largemouth bass and some panfish. Cold water species of fish such as rainbow trout and brown trout can be caught in Trout Run and other tributaries of Swatara Creek.

=== Hunting ===
Hunting is permitted in most of Swatara State Park. Hunters are expected to follow the rules and regulations of the Pennsylvania State Game Commission. The most common game species are ruffed grouse, squirrels, turkey, white-tailed deer, waterfowl and pheasant. There are also some black bears, opossum, muskrats and raccoons.

=== Boating ===
Boating in Swatara State Park is limited to canoes and kayaks. This type of boating is popular at the park and there are several easily accessible launch points along the banks of Swatara Creek.

=== Hiking ===
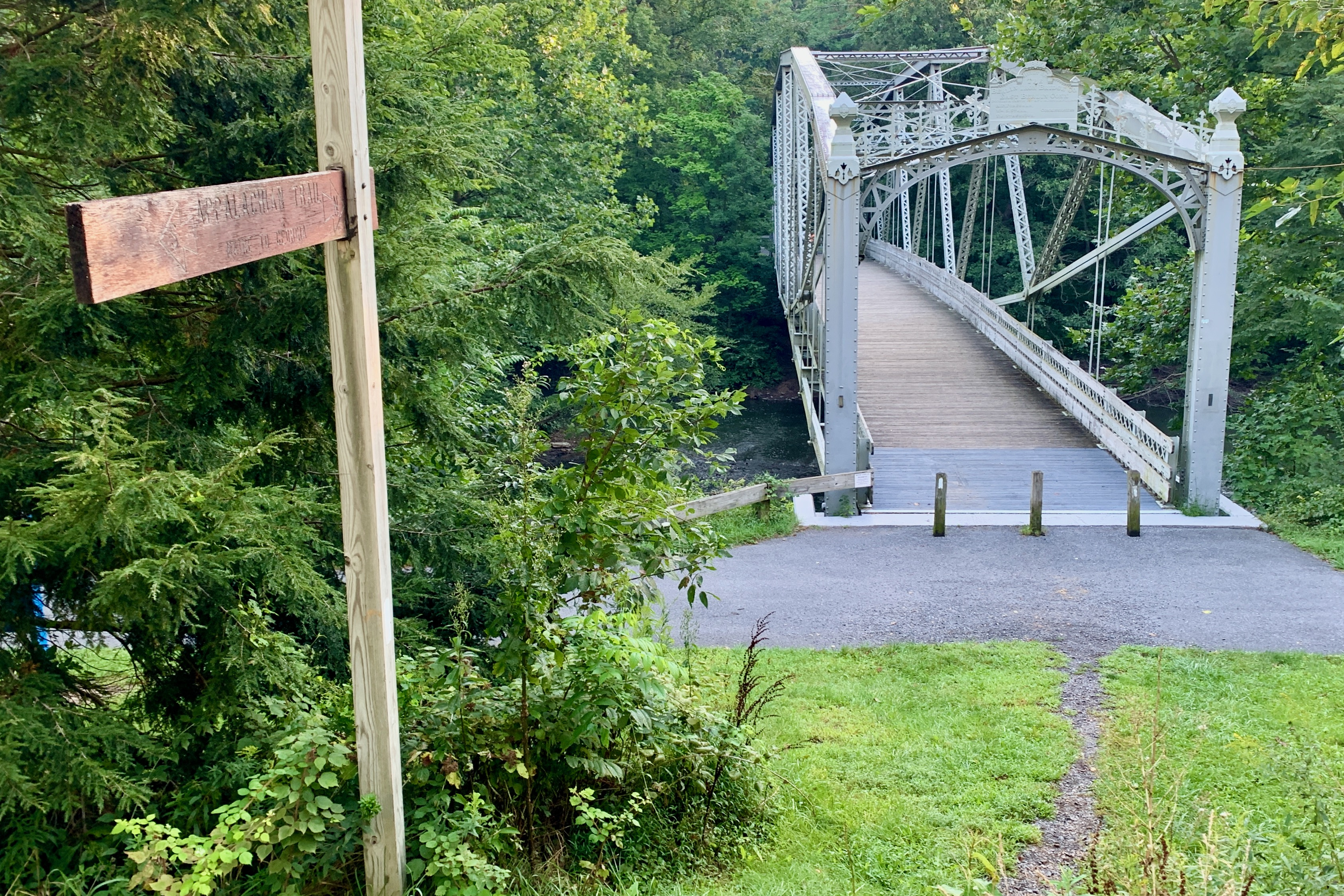
Appalachian Trail crossing Swatara Creek on the Waterville Bridge

The Appalachian Trail passes through Swatara State Park for 2 miles (3.2 km) at the southern end of the park. The trail crosses Swatara Creek at the historic Waterville Bridge. This unique bridge was moved from Waterville in Lycoming County (where it crossed Little Pine Creek) to Swatara State Park in the 1980s. The bridge is too narrow for modern use, so instead of being destroyed, it was moved to be used on the Appalachian Trail. The bridge is a parabolic structure known as a lenticular truss. The Swatara Rail Trail and Old State Route 443 combine to make a 10 miles (16 km) loop to provide less strenuous hiking at the park.

=== Natural history ===
Forests are overtaking the land formerly used by farmers, miners, canalmen and railroadmen. Woodlands are plentiful at Swatara State Park. Visitors can observe the slow process in which nature reclaims the land previously used by man. Fossil hunters can find ancient marine fossils at a site along Old State Route 443.

=== Bordner Cabin ===
A log cabin, built in 1939 by local industrial-arts teacher Armar Bordner (1904-1994) and members of his class using materials found on-site next to the picturesque Acrigg's Falls, is preserved within the park. Bordner opposed the taking of his home by eminent domain by the old DER during creation of the park and was allowed to remain at the cabin for the remainder of his life, paying a token rent to DCNR each year. The cabin was then leased to the Boy Scouts of America for several years, and then was returned to DCNR control. After a proposal to raze the historic building, Swatara Watershed Association, led by Jo Ellen Litz, a Lebanon County commissioner, took over control of the building, which has been preserved by them including the installation of new roofing materials, but the cabin no longer has utilities or windows.
