= Topton, Pennsylvania =

Borough in Pennsylvania, US

- Borough
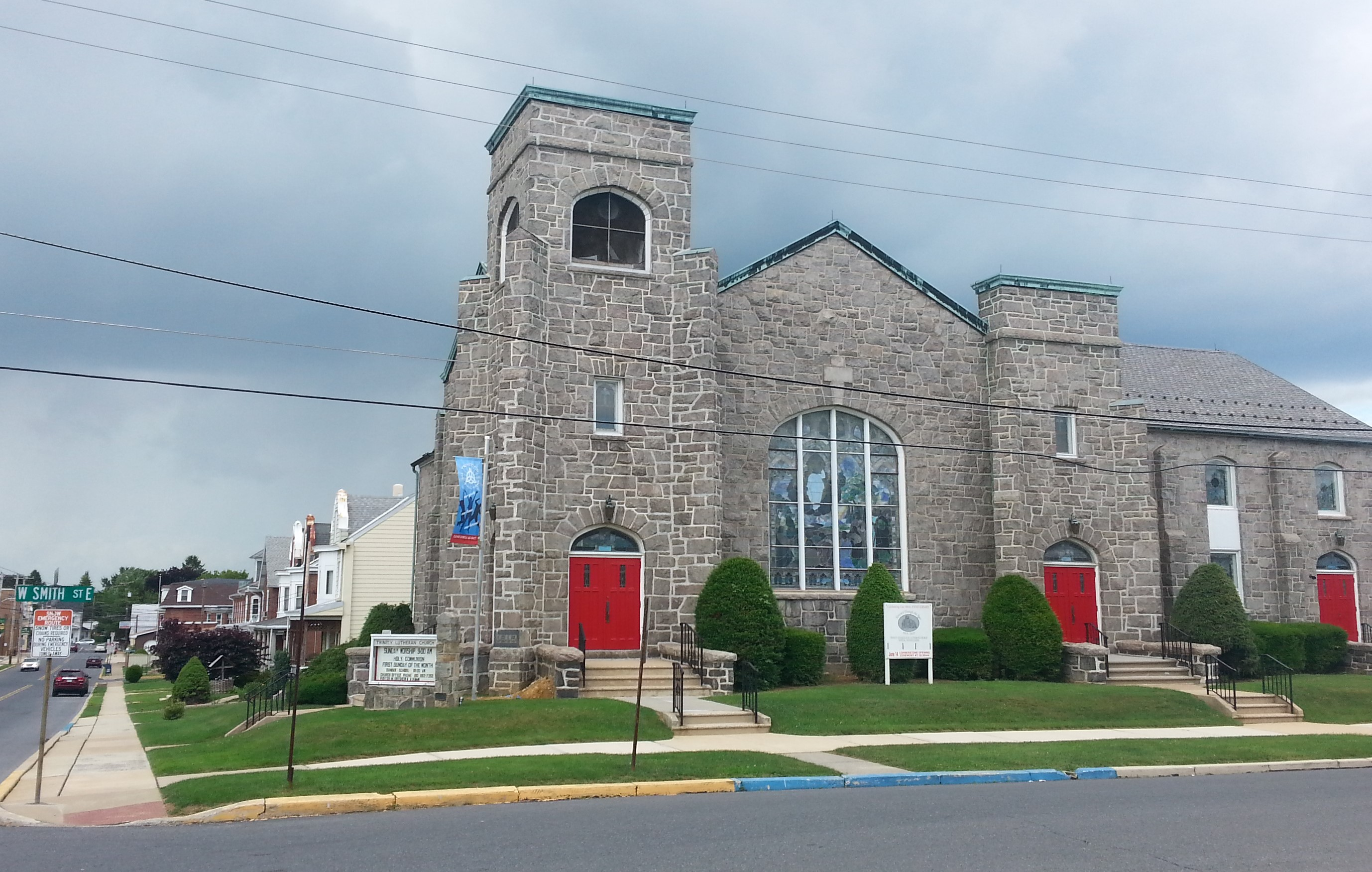
- Trinity Evangelical Lutheran Church in Topton, 2015

- Flag Logo

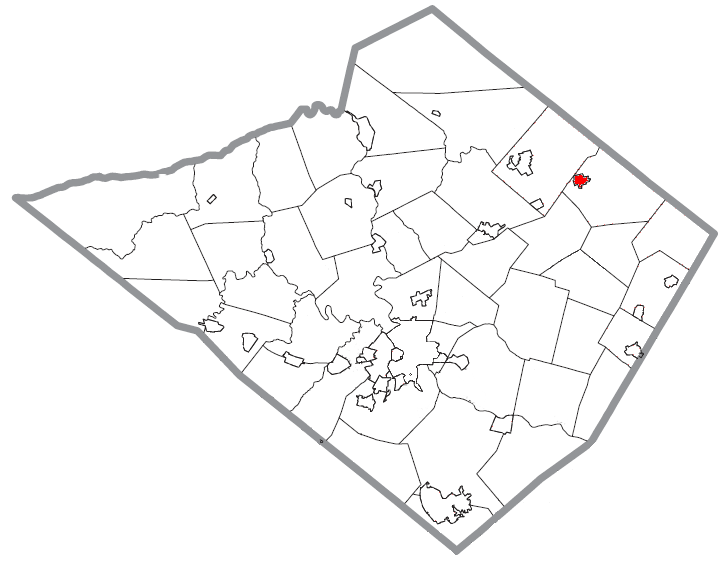
- Location in Berks County, Pennsylvania

- Location in Pennsylvania Location in the United States
- Coordinates: 40°30′11″N 75°42′06″W
- Country: United States
- State: Pennsylvania
- County: Berks

Government
  - Mayor: Tom Biltcliff

Area
  - Total: 0.69 sq mi (1.80 km^{2})
  - Land: 0.69 sq mi (1.79 km^{2})
  - Water: 0 sq mi (0.00 km^{2})
- Elevation: 486 ft (148 m)

Population (2020)
  - Total: 2,041
  - Estimate (2019): 2,069
  - Density: 2,986.4/sq mi (1,153.05/km^{2})
- Time zone: UTC-5 (EST)
  - Summer (DST): UTC-4 (EDT)
- ZIP Code: 19562
- Area codes: 610 and 484
- FIPS code: 42-77104
- Website: toptonborough.com

Topton is a borough in Berks County, Pennsylvania, United States. The population was 2,041 at the 2020 census.

== Geography ==
Topton is located at 40°30′11″N 75°42′6″W (40.503049, -75.701764).

According to the U.S. Census Bureau, the borough has a total area of 0.7 square miles (1.8 km^{2}), all land.

The Toad Creek drains Topton eastward into the Little Lehigh Creek. The ridge at the western edge of the borough separates it from the Schuylkill watershed.

== Demographics ==
Historical population
Census	Pop.	Note	%±
1880	515		—
1890	500		−2.9%
1900	542		8.4%
1910	809		49.3%
1920	1,147		41.8%
1930	1,667		45.3%
1940	1,568		−5.9%
1950	1,572		0.3%
1960	1,684		7.1%
1970	1,744		3.6%
1980	1,818		4.2%
1990	1,987		9.3%
2000	1,948		−2.0%
2010	2,069		6.2%
2020	2,041		−1.4%

At the 2000 census there were 1,948 people, 805 households, and 562 families living in the borough. The population density is 2,844.0 people per square mile (1,106.1/km^{2}). There were 842 housing units at an average density of 1,229.3 per square mile (474.6/km^{2}). The racial makeup of the borough was 98.87% White, 0.05% African American, 0.21% Native American, 0.21% Asian, 0.31% from other races, and 0.36% from two or more races. Hispanic or Latino of any race were 1.18%.

There were 805 households, 31.2% had children under the age of 18 living with them, 56.4% were married couples living together, 9.7% had a female householder with no husband present, and 30.1% were non-families. 24.5% of households were made up of individuals, and 10.9% were one person aged 65 or older. The average household size was 2.42 and the average family size was 2.90.

The age distribution was 23.4% under the age of 18, 7.3% from 18 to 24, 29.9% from 25 to 44, 23.9% from 45 to 64, and 15.6% 65 or older. The median age was 38 years. For every 100 females, there were 94.4 males. For every 100 females age 18 and over, there were 93.0 males.

The median household income was $45,888 and the median family income was $56,667. Males had a median income of $38,144 versus $25,476 for females. The per capita income for the borough was $24,009. 2.2% of families and 3.8% of the population were below the poverty line, including 1.9% of those under the age of 18 and 6.6% of those 65 and older.

== Government ==
=== Mayors ===
- William B. Herbein 1950 - 1954
- Norman Kramer 1958–1970
- James L. Schauer 1970–1976 (resigned 1976)
- Larry Werst 1976–1994 (appt. 1976)
- Lawrence Werst 1994 - 2006
- Tom Biltcliff 2006–2022
- Guy Miller 2023–Present

=== Police ===
Topton was formerly served by the Berks-Lehigh Regional Police who were disbanded December 31, 2012 at midnight. The Pennsylvania State Police serve Topton Borough in conjunction with the Fleetwood Police. As of January 1, 2020, the Fleetwood Police Department contracted to patrol the community for 40 hours a week.

=== Fire/EMS ===
Topton is served by the Topton Volunteer Fire Company No. 1 and Topton Ambulance.

== Transportation ==
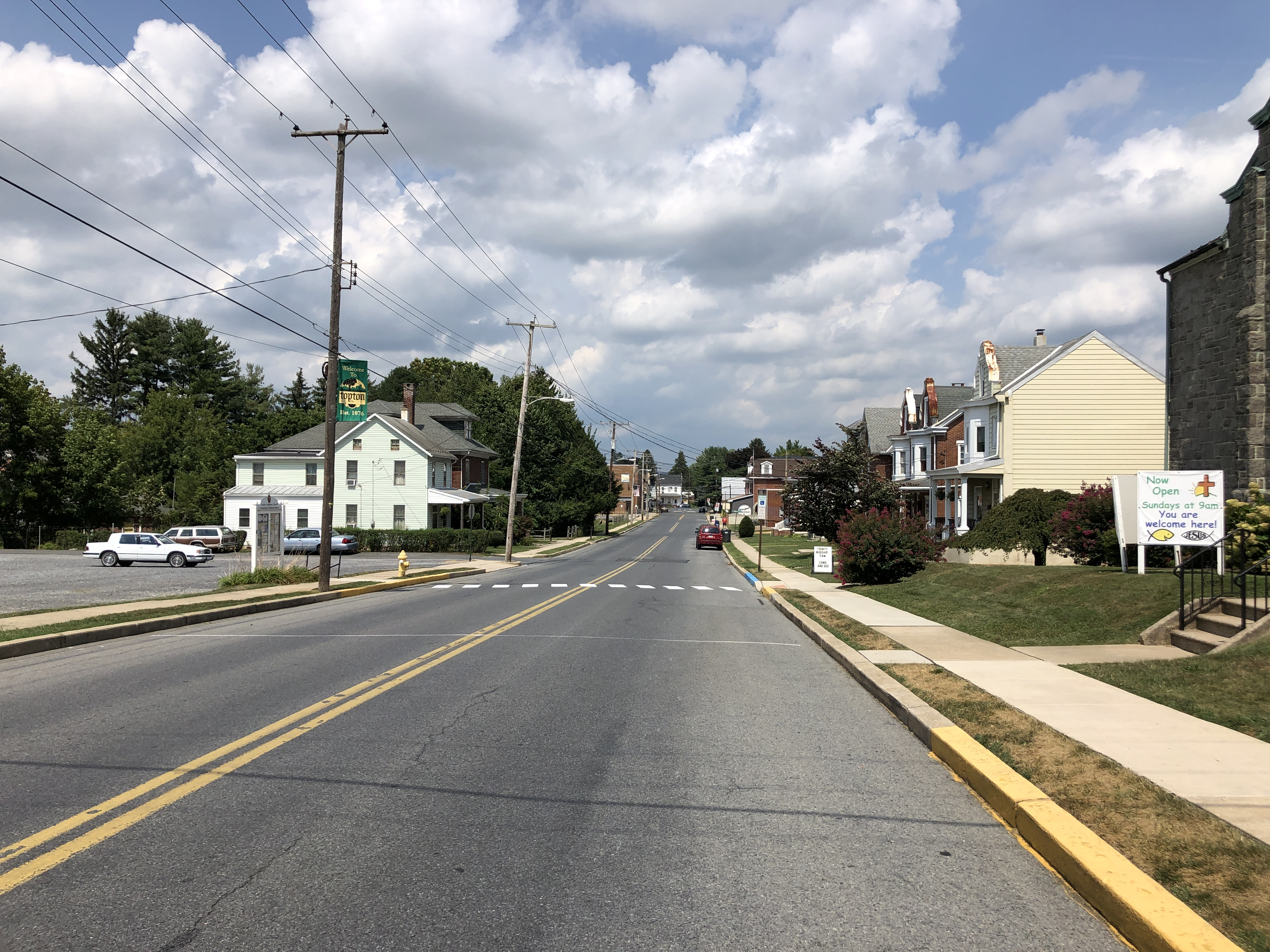
Home Avenue in Topton

As of 2019, there were 9.81 miles (15.79 km) of public roads in Topton, of which 0.86 miles (1.38 km) were maintained by the Pennsylvania Department of Transportation (PennDOT) and 8.95 miles (14.40 km) were maintained by the borough.

No numbered highways serve Topton. Main thoroughfares through the borough include Weis Street, Main Street and Home Avenue.
