= Auburn, Pennsylvania =

Borough in Pennsylvania, US

- Borough
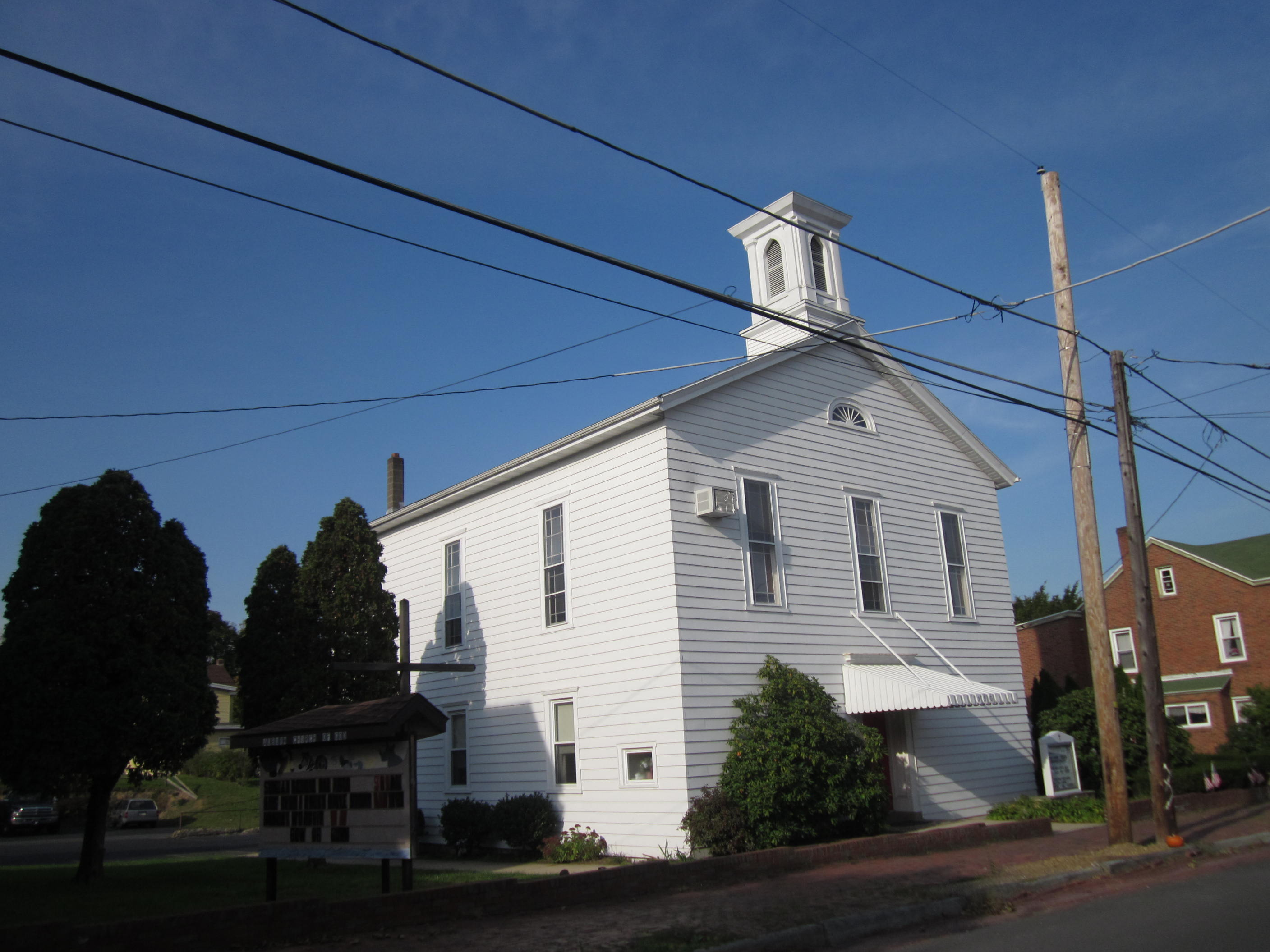
- Auburn Church of God in October 2011

- Location of Auburn in Schuylkill County, Pennsylvania

- Location in Pennsylvania Auburn (the United States)
- Coordinates: 40°35′45″N 76°05′34″W
- Country: United States
- State: Pennsylvania
- County: Schuylkill
- Incorporated: 1857

Government
  - Type: Borough Council

Area
  - Total: 1.68 sq mi (4.34 km^{2})
  - Land: 1.62 sq mi (4.20 km^{2})
  - Water: 0.050 sq mi (0.13 km^{2})
- Elevation: 479 ft (146 m)

Population (2020)
  - Total: 660
  - Density: 406.6/sq mi (156.97/km^{2})
- Time zone: UTC-5 (Eastern (EST))
  - Summer (DST): UTC-4 (EDT)
- ZIP Code: 17922
- Area codes: 570 and 272
- FIPS code: 42-03488
- Website: https://auburnboroughpa.com/

Auburn is a borough in Schuylkill County, Pennsylvania, United States. The population was 663 at the 2020 census.

== History ==
The area was historically known as the "Scotchman's Lock". The first house in what is today Auburn was built in the late 1830s by a boatman named Samuel Moyer, who also operated a store there. In 1842, the Philadelphia and Reading Railroad reached the area, at which point the area's official name was changed to "Auburn". The town became officially established in 1857. The Susquehanna and Schuylkill Railroad reached Auburn in 1857. The first post office in Auburn was built in 1846 and the first school was set up in 1846.

== Geography ==
Auburn is located at 40°35′45″N 76°5′34″W (40.595715, -76.092642). According to the United States Census Bureau, the borough has a total area of 1.7 square miles (4.4 km^{2}), of which 1.7 square miles (4.4 km^{2}) is land and 0.60% is water.

The borough's terrain is steeply hilly in the north and gently hilly in the south. Auburn's land is mostly forest, with some residential and agricultural areas. The Schuylkill River runs through Auburn. The borough is served by Pennsylvania Route 895.

== Demographics ==
Historical population
Census	Pop.	Note	%±
1860	527		—
1870	511		−3.0%
1880	740		44.8%
1890	880		18.9%
1900	845		−4.0%
1910	921		9.0%
1920	977		6.1%
1930	1,170		19.8%
1940	978		−16.4%
1950	994		1.6%
1960	936		−5.8%
1970	895		−4.4%
1980	999		11.6%
1990	913		−8.6%
2000	839		−8.1%
2010	741		−11.7%
2020	660		−10.9%
2021 (est.)	663	▲	0.5%

As of the census of 2000, there were 839 people, 325 households, and 242 families residing in the borough. The population density was 505.4 inhabitants per square mile (195.1/km^{2}). There were 340 housing units at an average density of 204.8 per square mile (79.1/km^{2}). The racial makeup of the borough was 98.93% White, 0.83% African American, 0.12% Asian, and 0.12% from two or more races.

There were 325 households, out of which 33.5% had children under the age of 18 living with them, 57.2% were married couples living together, 11.7% had a female householder with no husband present, and 25.5% were non-families. 22.5% of all households were made up of individuals, and 10.8% had someone living alone who was 65 years of age or older. The average household size was 2.58 and the average family size was 3.02.

The demographic distribution in the borough was varied, with 24.7% of the population under the age of 18, 6.8% between 18 and 24, 32.1% between 25 and 44, 23.7% between 45 and 64, and 12.8% who were 65 years or older. The median age of the population was 38 years. In terms of gender, for every 100 females, there were 100.2 males, and for every 100 females aged 18 and over, there were 92.1 males.

The median income for a household in the borough was $36,905, and the median income for a family was $40,833. Males had a median income of $33,021 versus $20,707 for females. The per capita income for the borough was $15,705. About 8.3% of families and 7.7% of the population were below the poverty line, including 12.4% of those under age 18 and 1.8% of those age 65 or over.
