= Cornwall-Lebanon School District =

School district in Pennsylvania

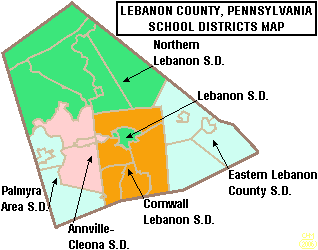

Location
- streetaddress = 105 East Evergreen Road Lebanon, Lebanon County, Pennsylvania, 17042; United States

Students and staff
- District mascot: Falcons
- Colors: Blue, White, Gray

Other information
- Website: www.clsd.k12.pa.us

The Cornwall-Lebanon School District is a public school district covering the Boroughs of Cornwall and Mount Gretna and North Cornwall Township, North Lebanon Township, South Lebanon Township, West Cornwall Township and West Lebanon Township in Lebanon County, Pennsylvania. It is part of the Lancaster-Lebanon Intermediate Unit (IU 13). The district operates one High School, one Middle School and four Elementary Schools.

== Schools ==
=== Elementary schools ===
- Cornwall Elementary, located in historic Cornwall, Pennsylvania, home of the Cornwall Iron Furnace
- Ebenezer Elementary, one of the oldest elementary schools in Pennsylvania, it moved to a bigger location and is now the school district's largest elementary school
- South Lebanon Elementary, located in South Lebanon Township, is the smallest elementary school
- Union Canal Elementary, named after the historic Union Canal Tunnel, it is located on the east end of the school district

=== Middle school ===
- Cedar Crest Middle School

=== Secondary school ===
- Cedar Crest High School, located at 115 East Evergreen Road in Lebanon, Pennsylvania
