= Pleasant Hill, Pennsylvania =

Unincorporated community in Pennsylvania, US

- Census-designated place
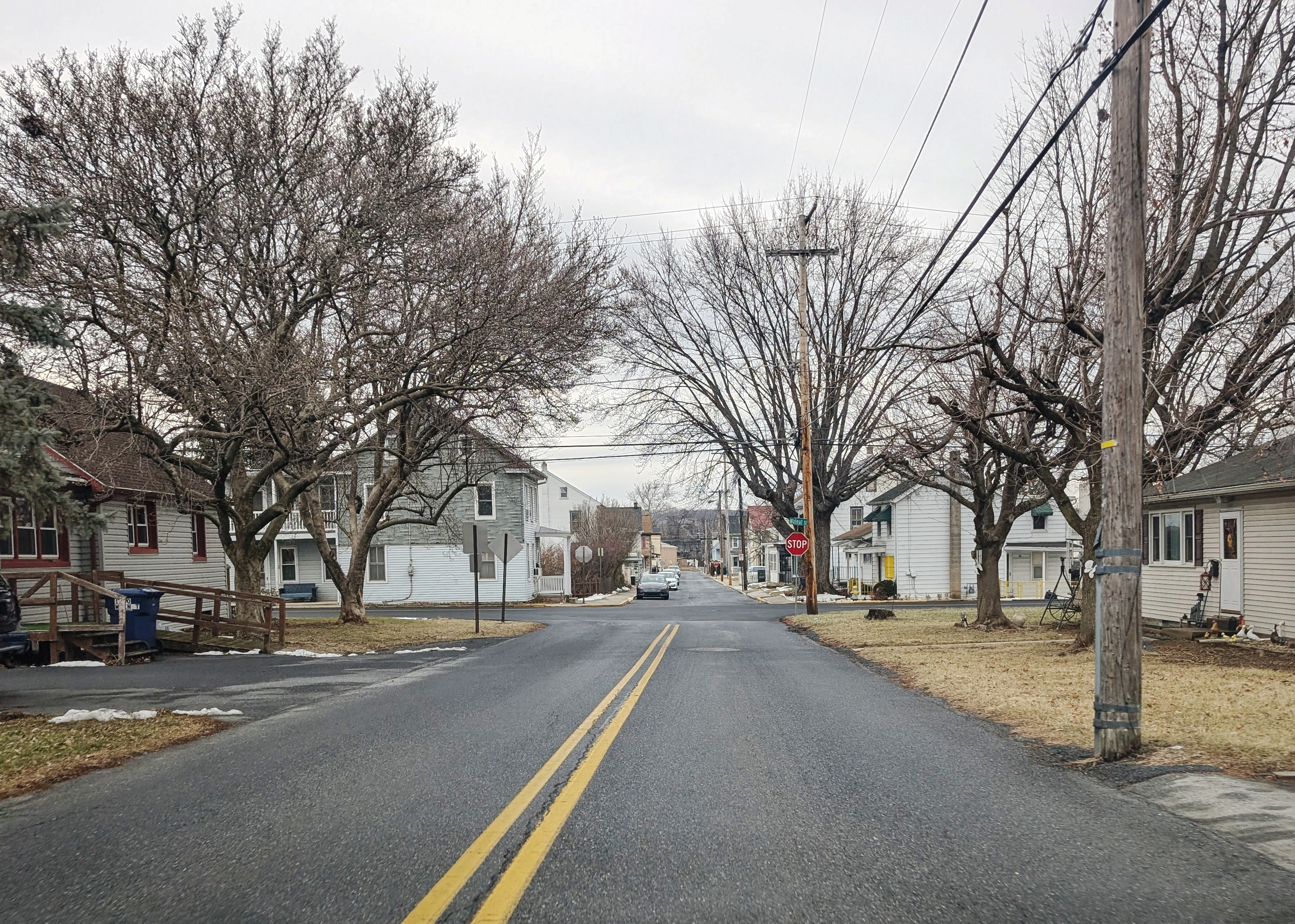
- 18th Street in Pleasant Hill within North Cornwall Township

- Location in Pennsylvania Location in the United States
- Coordinates: 40°20′10″N 76°26′39″W
- Country: United States
- State: Pennsylvania
- County: Lebanon
- Townships: North Lebanon; West Lebanon; North Cornwall

Area
  - Total: 0.73 sq mi (1.90 km^{2})
  - Land: 0.73 sq mi (1.89 km^{2})
  - Water: 0.0077 sq mi (0.02 km^{2})
- Elevation: 558 ft (170 m)

Population (2020)
  - Total: 2,926
  - Density: 4,017.8/sq mi (1,551.29/km^{2})
- Time zone: UTC-5 (Eastern (EST))
  - Summer (DST): UTC-4 (EDT)
- ZIP code: 17042
- Area code: 717
- FIPS code: 42-61312
- GNIS feature ID: 1184020

Pleasant Hill is an unincorporated community and census-designated place (CDP) in Lebanon County, Pennsylvania, United States. The population was 2,643 at the 2010 census, up from 2,301 at the 2000 census.

== Geography ==
Pleasant Hill is located in central Lebanon County at 40°20′10″N 76°26′39″W (40.336082, -76.444248). It is bordered to the east and southeast by the city of Lebanon, the county seat, and to the west by the borough of Cleona. Pleasant Hill is in parts of three townships: the western end is in North Lebanon Township, the northeast part is in West Lebanon Township, and the majority of the community is in North Cornwall Township.

U.S. Route 422 (West Cumberland Avenue) is the main road through Pleasant Hill; it leads east through Lebanon 29 miles (47 km) to Reading and west-southwest 12 miles (19 km) to Hershey. Harrisburg, the state capital, is 26 miles (42 km) west of Pleasant Hill.

According to the United States Census Bureau, the CDP has a total area of 0.73 square miles (1.9 km^{2}), of which 0.01 square miles (0.02 km^{2}), or 0.85%, are water. Quittapahilla Creek flows through the center of the community, leading west to Swatara Creek, a tributary of the Susquehanna River.

== Demographics ==
Historical population
Census	Pop.	Note	%±
2020	2,926		—
U.S. Decennial Census

As of the 2010 United States census, there were 2,643 people living in the CDP. The racial makeup of the CDP was 68.8% White, 5.0% Black, 0.3% Native American, 2.9% Asian, 0.2% from some other race and 1.3% from two or more races. 21.6% were Hispanic or Latino of any race.
