= Lebanon South, Pennsylvania =

Unincorporated community in Pennsylvania, US

- Census-designated place
- Location in Pennsylvania Location in the United States
- Coordinates: 40°19′47″N 76°24′39″W
- Country: United States
- State: Pennsylvania
- County: Lebanon
- Township: South Lebanon

Area
  - Total: 0.79 sq mi (2.04 km^{2})
  - Land: 0.79 sq mi (2.04 km^{2})
  - Water: 0 sq mi (0.00 km^{2})
- Elevation: 510 ft (160 m)

Population (2020)
  - Total: 2,383
  - Density: 3,021.8/sq mi (1,166.74/km^{2})
- Time zone: UTC-5 (Eastern (EST))
  - Summer (DST): UTC-4 (EDT)
- ZIP code: 17042
- Area code: 717
- FIPS code: 42-42192
- GNIS feature ID: 2390048

Lebanon South is an unincorporated area and census-designated place (CDP) in Lebanon County, Pennsylvania, United States. The population was 2,270 at the 2010 census.

== Geography ==
Lebanon South is located in central Lebanon County at 40°19′47″N 76°24′39″W (40.329614, -76.410835), in the northwest corner of South Lebanon Township. It is bordered to the north and west by the city of Lebanon, the county seat.

According to the United States Census Bureau, the CDP has a total area of 0.8 square miles (2.0 km^{2}), of which 2.2 acres (8,863 m^{2}), or 0.43%, are water. The community is drained by northwest-flowing tributaries of Quittapahilla Creek, part of the Swatara Creek watershed flowing to the Susquehanna River.

== Demographics ==
Historical population
Census	Pop.	Note	%±
2020	2,383		—
U.S. Decennial Census

=== 2020 census ===
As of the 2020 census, Lebanon South had a population of 2,383. The median age was 46.5 years. 19.2% of residents were under the age of 18 and 24.0% of residents were 65 years of age or older. For every 100 females there were 90.3 males, and for every 100 females age 18 and over there were 89.2 males age 18 and over.

100.0% of residents lived in urban areas, while 0.0% lived in rural areas.

There were 1,042 households in Lebanon South, of which 24.4% had children under the age of 18 living in them. Of all households, 49.5% were married-couple households, 15.8% were households with a male householder and no spouse or partner present, and 27.5% were households with a female householder and no spouse or partner present. About 31.0% of all households were made up of individuals and 17.0% had someone living alone who was 65 years of age or older.

There were 1,075 housing units, of which 3.1% were vacant. The homeowner vacancy rate was 0.8% and the rental vacancy rate was 1.6%.

Racial composition as of the 2020 census
Race	Number	Percent
White	2,024	84.9%
Black or African American	30	1.3%
American Indian and Alaska Native	4	0.2%
Asian	21	0.9%
Native Hawaiian and Other Pacific Islander	0	0.0%
Some other race	138	5.8%
Two or more races	166	7.0%
Hispanic or Latino (of any race)	277	11.6%

=== 2000 census ===
As of the 2000 census, there were 2,145 people, 947 households, and 661 families residing in the CDP. The population density was 2,711.6 inhabitants per square mile (1,047.0/km^{2}). There were 974 housing units at an average density of 1,231.3 per square mile (475.4/km^{2}). The racial makeup of the CDP was 97.39% White, 0.61% African American, 0.05% Native American, 0.89% Asian, 0.51% from other races, and 0.56% from two or more races. Hispanic or Latino of any race were 1.77% of the population.

There were 947 households, out of which 23.7% had children under the age of 18 living with them, 59.8% were married couples living together, 7.4% had a female householder with no husband present, and 30.2% were non-families. 25.7% of all households were made up of individuals, and 15.3% had someone living alone who was 65 years of age or older. The average household size was 2.26 and the average family size was 2.70.

In the CDP, the population was spread out, with 18.6% under the age of 18, 4.5% from 18 to 24, 26.2% from 25 to 44, 24.2% from 45 to 64, and 26.5% who were 65 years of age or older. The median age was 45 years. For every 100 females, there were 86.8 males. For every 100 females age 18 and over, there were 82.7 males.

The median income for a household in the CDP was $46,366, and the median income for a family was $52,813. Males had a median income of $39,500 versus $23,409 for females. The per capita income for the CDP was $23,358. About 2.8% of families and 3.8% of the population were below the poverty line, including 7.1% of those under age 18 and 3.3% of those age 65 or over.
