= Annville-Cleona School District =

School district in Pennsylvania

Coordinates: 40.32364°N 76.50782°W

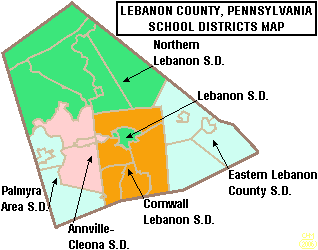

Address
- 500 South White Oak Street Annville, Lebanon County, Pennsylvania, 17003; United States

District information
- Type: Public
- Grades: K-12

Students and staff
- District mascot: Dutchmen

Other information
- Website: acschools.org

The Annville-Cleona School District is a small, public school district in Lebanon County, Pennsylvania. It serves the Borough of Cleona, Annville Township, North Annville Township and South Annville Township in Lebanon County, Pennsylvania. The district encompasses approximately 40 square miles (100 km^{2}). According to 2002 local census data, it serves a resident population of 11,876. In 2009, the district residents’ per capita income was $19,519, while the median family income was $36,276. In the Commonwealth, the median family income was $52,381 and the United States median family income was $49,445, in 2010. It is a relatively small school.

The district operates Annville-Cleona High School (7th-12th grades), Annville Elementary (3rd-6th grades), and Cleona Elementary (Kindergarten-2nd grades).
