= House of Miller at Millbach =

Historic house in Pennsylvania, United States

- U.S. National Register of Historic Places
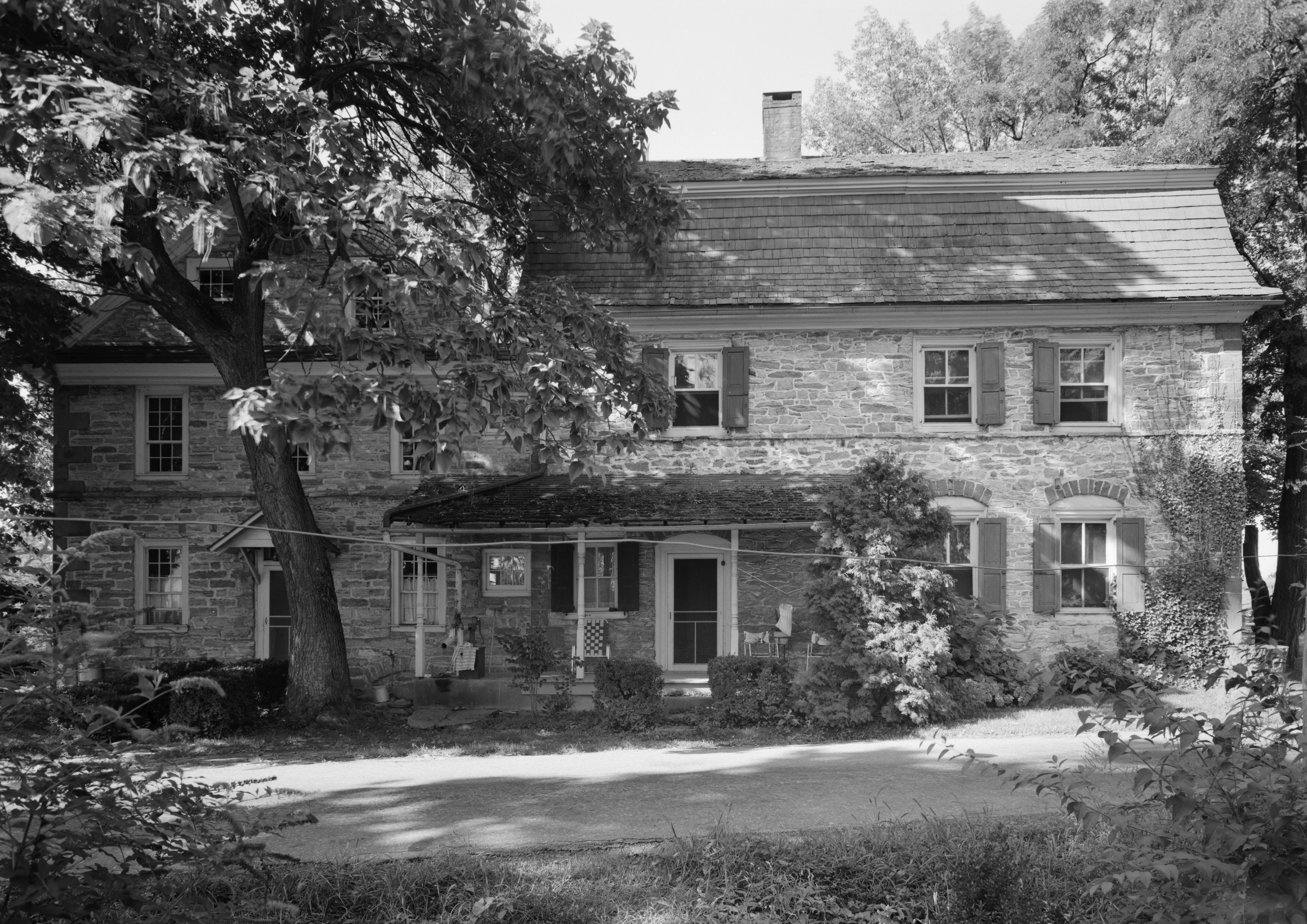
- House of Miller at Millbach, HABS Photo, September 1958

- Location within Pennsylvania Location within the United States
- Location: Southwest of Newmanstown off Pennsylvania Route 419, Millcreek Township, Pennsylvania. Intersection of Rod & Gun Road and S. Millbach Road.
- Coordinates: 40°19′49″N 76°14′19″W
- Area: 46 acres (19 ha)
- Built: 1752, 1784
- Architectural style: Germanic Pennsylvania
- NRHP reference No.: 73001640
- Added to NRHP: April 23, 1973

The House of Miller at Millbach, also known as the Mueller House and Illig's Mill, is an American historic home and grist mill which are located in Millcreek Township, Lebanon County, Pennsylvania.

It was added to the National Register of Historic Places in 1973.

== History and architectural features ==
Built in 1752, the historic house on this property is a 2 1/2-story, sandstone and limestone residence with a gambrel roof, which was designed in a Germanic style. The mill was built in 1784, and is a 2 1/2-story, limestone building with a gable roof. It is attached to the house. Also located on the property is a small log cabin.
