= West Lebanon Township, Pennsylvania =

Township in Pennsylvania, US

- Township
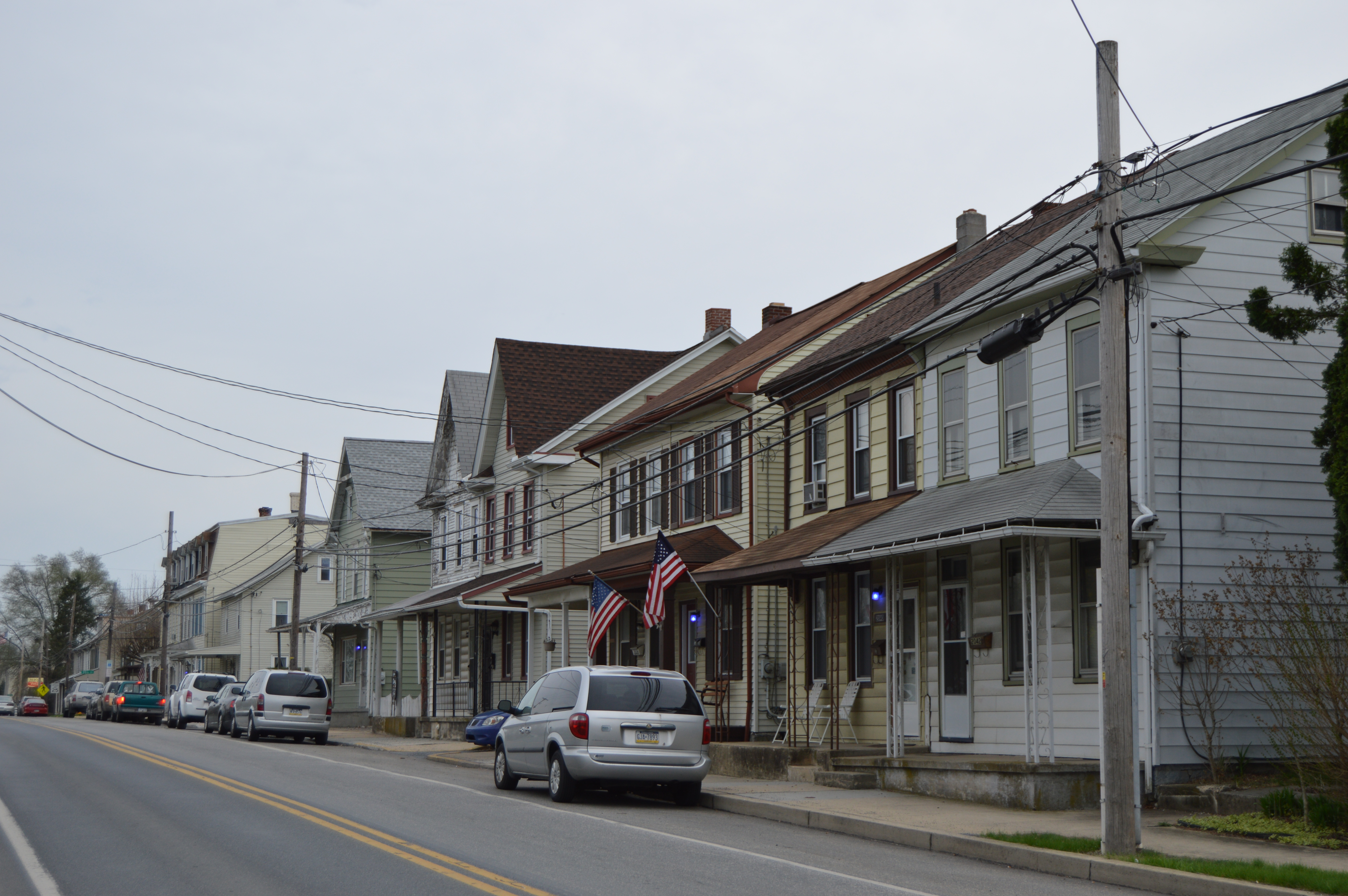
- Houses on Lehman Street

- Location in Pennsylvania Location in the United States
- Coordinates: 40°20′42″N 76°27′00″W
- Country: United States
- State: Pennsylvania
- County: Lebanon
- Incorporated: 1888

Area
  - Total: 0.39 sq mi (1.02 km^{2})
  - Land: 0.39 sq mi (1.00 km^{2})
  - Water: 0.0077 sq mi (0.02 km^{2})
- Elevation: 472 ft (144 m)

Population (2020)
  - Total: 830 ▲
  - Estimate (2021): 832
  - Density: 2,092.9/sq mi (808.06/km^{2})
- Time zone: UTC-5 (Eastern (EST))
  - Summer (DST): UTC-4 (EDT)
- Area code: 717
- FIPS code: 42-075-83312
- Website: westlebanonpa.gov

West Lebanon Township is a township in Lebanon County, Pennsylvania, United States. It is part of the Lebanon, PA Metropolitan Statistical Area. The population was 830 at the 2020 census.

== Geography ==
According to the United States Census Bureau, the township has a total area of 0.4 square mile (1.1 km^{2}), all land. It is bordered to the east and north by the city of Lebanon, to the west by North Lebanon Township, and to the south by North Cornwall Township. The southern half of the township is part of the Pleasant Hill census-designated place.

== Demographics ==
Historical population
Census	Pop.	Note	%±
2000	836		—
2010	781		−6.6%
2020	830		6.3%
2021 (est.)	832		0.2%
U.S. Decennial Census

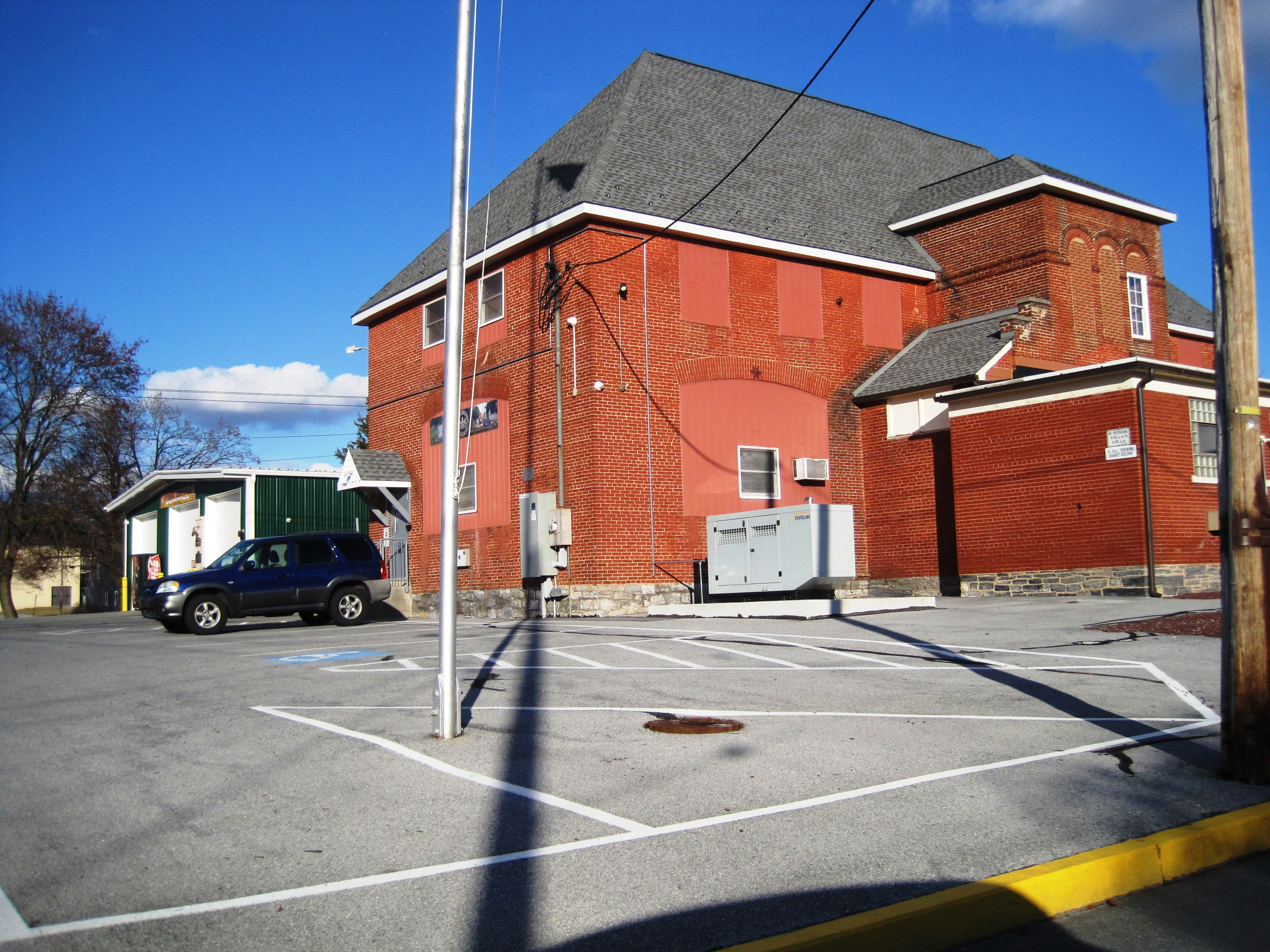
West Lebanon Municipal Building

As of the census of 2010, there were 781 people, 326 households, and 220 families residing in the township. The population density was 2,079.5 inhabitants per square mile (802.9/km^{2}). There were 346 housing units at an average density of 860.7 per square mile (332.3/km^{2}). The racial makeup of the township was 89.8% White, 2.4% African American, 0.8% Asian, 3.6% from other races, and 3.5% from two or more races. Hispanic or Latino of any race were 11.3% of the population.

There were 326 households, out of which 26.1% had children under the age of 18 living with them, 49.1% were married couples living together, 11.3% had a female householder with no husband present, and 32.5% were non-families. 25.2% of all households were made up of single individuals, and 8.2% were individuals who were 65 years of age or older. The average household size was 2.40 and the average family size was 2.84.

In the township, the population was spread out, with 21.4% under the age of 18, 65.2% who were between 18 and 65, and 13.4% who were 65 years of age or older. The median age was 40.

The median income for a household in the township was $37,143, and the median income for a family was $41,250. Males had a median income of $31,591 versus $23,594 for females. The per capita income for the township was $18,709. About 8.4% of families and 8.4% of the population were below the poverty line, including 15.5% of those under age 18 and 7.6% of those age 65 or over.
