= Cedar Crest High School =

Public high school in Pennsylvania, United States

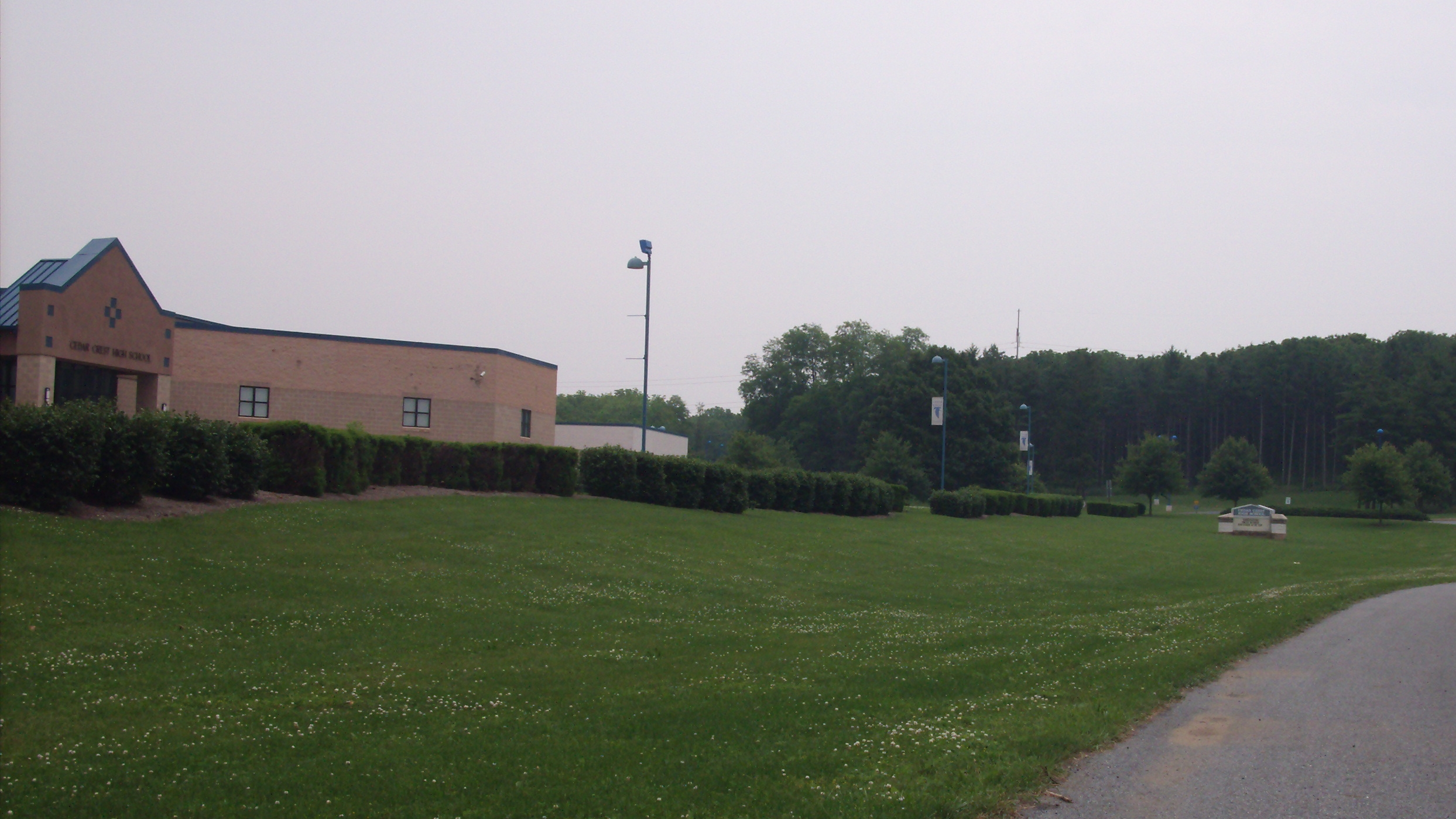
- Cedar Crest High School in August 2009

Location
- 115 S. Evergreen Road; Lebanon, Lebanon County, PA, 17042; United States; 40.310°N 76.399°W

Information
- School type: Public, Secondary
- School district: Cornwall-Lebanon School District
- Teaching staff: 103.00 (FTE)
- Grades: 9 to 12
- Enrollment: 1,648 (2023–2024)
- Student to teacher ratio: 16.00
- Colors: Royal blue and gray
- Athletics conference: PIAA District 3
- Mascot: Falcon
- Team name: Cedar Crest Falcons
- Feeder schools: Cedar Crest Middle School
- Website: Cedar Crest High School

Cedar Crest High School is a public high school located in Lebanon, Pennsylvania. The school serves over 2000 students in grades 9 to 12 in the Cornwall-Lebanon School District.

Cedar Crest High School was founded in 1966. The current principal is Christopher Groff. Population of the school is estimated at over 2000 students.

== Academics ==
Cedar Crest High School offers four (4) different levels of classes to meet the needs of students including applied, college prep, honors, Advanced Placement courses, and learning support. Students also have the option of enrolling in College in the High School classes, where they can complete college level classes for both college and high school credit. College classes are available for students to take through Harrisburg Area Community College and the University of Pittsburgh. All students are required to complete 3 credits in the areas of mathematics, social studies, and science. Students are also required to complete 4 credits in the area of English. In addition, students must complete a certain number of electives each year as well as the completion of a senior project.

The school offers foreign language study in Spanish, French, German, and Latin. Each language is offered at levels 1 through 4, with levels 3 and 4 of each language ranked as an honors level course. The exception to this rule is Spanish, which has a level 2 ranked as an honors course. In addition, students also have the option of taking College Spanish. Although students do not have to study a language to graduate, many students participate in the foreign language program for two years in order to meet possible college requirements.

== Notable alumni ==
- Dave Arnold (1989), Pennsylvania state senator and former Lebanon County district attorney
- Jamie Lynn Corkish, sport shooter who won a gold medal at the 2012 Summer Olympics in women's 50 metre rifle three positions
- Derek Fisher (2011), former professional baseball player
- Frank Reich (1980), former professional football player and former NFL head coach of the Indianapolis Colts and Carolina Panthers
- Sam Yoon, Boston City Council member
- Chad Ryland (2018), kicker for the Arizona Cardinals
