= Gloninger Estate =

Historic house in Pennsylvania, United States

- U.S. National Register of Historic Places
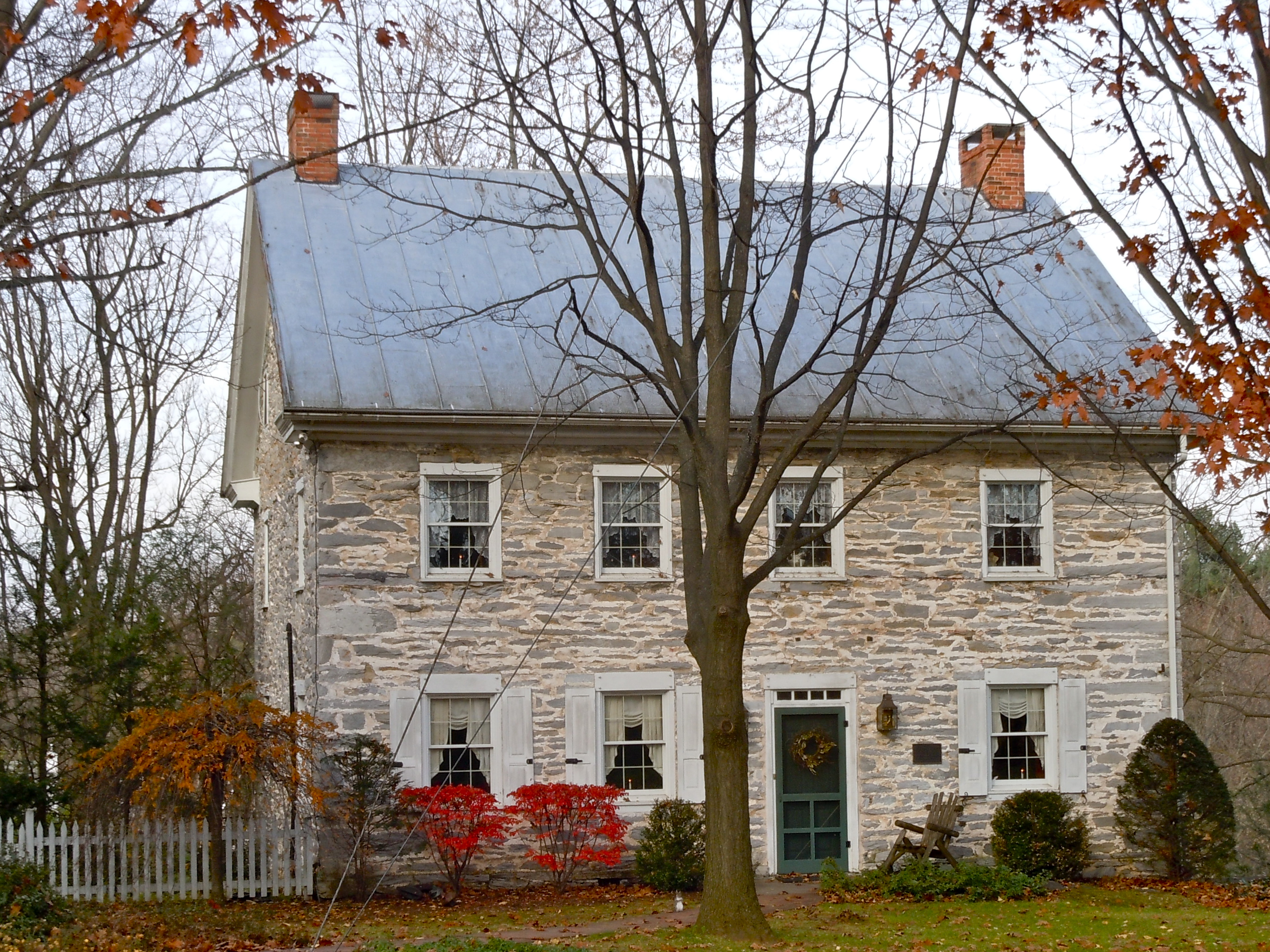
- Gloninger Estate, November 2011

- Location within Pennsylvania Location within the United States
- Location: 2511 West Oak Street, southwest of Lebanon, North Cornwall Township, Pennsylvania
- Coordinates: 40°19′25″N 76°27′12″W
- Area: 4.6 acres (1.9 ha)
- Built: c. 1785
- Architectural style: "Swiss-German" vernacular
- NRHP reference No.: 80003546
- Added to NRHP: December 10, 1980

Gloninger Estate is a historic home located at North Cornwall Township, Lebanon County, Pennsylvania. It was built about 1785, and is a 2 1/2-story, limestone residence, built into a bank of limestone rock. It has a steeply pitched roof and is reflective of the "Swiss-German" architectural style. Also on the property is a contributing limestone smokehouse.

It was added to the National Register of Historic Places in 1980.
