= Avon, Pennsylvania =

Unincorporated community in Pennsylvania, US

- Census-designated place
- Location in Pennsylvania Location in the United States
- Coordinates: 40°20′44″N 76°23′23″W
- Country: United States
- State: Pennsylvania
- County: Lebanon
- Townships: South Lebanon; North Lebanon

Area
  - Total: 1.37 sq mi (3.56 km^{2})
  - Land: 1.37 sq mi (3.56 km^{2})
  - Water: 0 sq mi (0.00 km^{2})
- Elevation: 478 ft (146 m)

Population (2020)
  - Total: 1,676
  - Density: 1,217.9/sq mi (470.24/km^{2})
- Time zone: UTC-5 (Eastern (EST))
  - Summer (DST): UTC-4 (EDT)
- FIPS code: 42-03648
- GNIS feature ID: 2389162

Avon is an unincorporated community and census-designated place (CDP) in Lebanon County, Pennsylvania, United States. As of the 2020 census, Avon had a population of 1,676.

== Geography ==
Avon is located in central Lebanon County at 40°20′45″N 76°23′12″W (40.345923, -76.386756). It is primarily in South Lebanon Township but extends north slightly into North Lebanon Township. It is bordered to the northwest by the city of Lebanon and to the west by the Hebron census-designated place. The Avon census-designated place contains the communities of Avon and Avon Heights.

U.S. Route 422 (East Cumberland Street) passes through Avon, leading west into the center of Lebanon and east 27 miles (43 km) to Reading. Harrisburg, the state capital, is 30 miles (48 km) to the west via US-422 and US-322.

According to the United States Census Bureau, in 2010 the CDP had an area of 1.4 square miles (3.6 km^{2}), down from 1.6 square miles (4.1 km^{2}) at the 2000 census all land. The community drains southwest to Quittapahilla Creek, which flows west through the center of Lebanon and is a tributary of Swatara Creek, itself a tributary of the Susquehanna River.

== Demographics ==
Historical population
Census	Pop.	Note	%±
2020	1,676		—
U.S. Decennial Census

At the 2000 census, there were 2,856 people, 854 households and 615 families residing in the CDP. The population density was 1,769.8 inhabitants per square mile (683.3/km^{2}). There were 916 housing units at an average density of 567.6 per square mile (219.2/km^{2}). The racial makeup of the CDP was 94.92% White, 1.86% African American, 0.18% Native American, 0.74% Asian, 0.04% Pacific Islander, 1.61% from other races, and 0.67% from two or more races. Hispanic or Latino of any race were 5.39% of the population.

There were 854 households, of which 33.0% had children under the age of 18 living with them, 59.8% were married couples living together, 8.8% had a female householder with no husband present, and 27.9% were non-families. 24.4% of all households were made up of individuals, and 11.5% had someone living alone who was 65 years of age or older. The average household size was 2.57 and the average family size was 3.04.

18.7% of the population were under the age of 18, 9.3% from 18 to 24, 29.7% from 25 to 44, 20.6% from 45 to 64, and 21.7% who were 65 years of age or older. The median age was 40 years. For every 100 females, there were 99.2 males. For every 100 females age 18 and over, there were 92.9 males.

The median household income was $39,872 and the median family income was $42,358. Males had a median income of $33,393 versus $27,717 for females. The per capita income for the CDP was $15,901. About 3.6% of families and 6.2% of the population were below the poverty line, including 9.2% of those under age 18 and 2.4% of those age 65 or over.
