= Hebron, Pennsylvania =

Unincorporated community in Pennsylvania, US

- Census-designated place
- Location within Pennsylvania Location within the United States
- Coordinates: 40°20′20″N 76°23′58″W
- Country: United States
- State: Pennsylvania
- County: Lebanon
- Township: South Lebanon

Area
  - Total: 0.16 sq mi (0.42 km^{2})
  - Land: 0.16 sq mi (0.42 km^{2})
  - Water: 0 sq mi (0.00 km^{2})
- Elevation: 509 ft (155 m)

Population (2020)
  - Total: 939
  - Density: 5,858.9/sq mi (2,262.12/km^{2})
- Time zone: UTC-5 (Eastern (EST))
  - Summer (DST): UTC-4 (EDT)
- ZIP code: 17042
- Area code: 717
- FIPS code: 42-33504
- GNIS feature ID: 1176739

Hebron is a census-designated place in South Lebanon Township, Pennsylvania, United States. As of the 2010 census the population was 1,305. The Lebanon County Prison is located within the CDP.

== Geography ==
Hebron is in central Lebanon County, along the northern edge of South Lebanon Township. It is bordered to the north and west by the city of Lebanon, the county seat, and to the east by unincorporated Avon.

According to the U.S. Census Bureau, the Hebron CDP has an area of 0.20 square miles (0.52 km^{2}), all land. The area drains north to Quittapahilla Creek, the main stream through Lebanon, flowing west to Swatara Creek, part of the Susquehanna River watershed.

== Demographics ==
Historical population
Census	Pop.	Note	%±
2020	939		—
U.S. Decennial Census
