= Mount Wilson, Pennsylvania =

Unincorporated community in Pennsylvania, US

- Unincorporated community
- Location within Pennsylvania Location within the United States
- Coordinates: 40°15′22″N 76°30′35″W
- Country: United States
- State: Pennsylvania
- County: Lebanon
- Townships: South Annville; South Londonderry
- Elevation: 712 ft (217 m)
- Time zone: UTC-5 (Eastern (EST))
  - Summer (DST): UTC-4 (EDT)
- Area code: 717
- GNIS feature ID: 1181887

Mount Wilson is an unincorporated community on the border of South Annville Township and South Londonderry Township in Lebanon County, Pennsylvania, United States. Mount Wilson is located along Pennsylvania Route 241.
