= Stricklerstown, Pennsylvania =

Unincorporated community in Pennsylvania, US

- Unincorporated community
- Location within Pennsylvania Location within the United States
- Coordinates: 40°19′30″N 76°13′33″W
- Country: United States
- State: Pennsylvania
- County: Lebanon
- Township: Millcreek
- Elevation: 535 ft (163 m)
- Time zone: UTC-5 (Eastern (EST))
  - Summer (DST): UTC-4 (EDT)
- Area codes: 717 & 223
- GNIS feature ID: 1188880

Stricklerstown is an unincorporated community in Millcreek Township, Lebanon County, Pennsylvania, United States.
