= South Annville Township, Pennsylvania =

Township in Pennsylvania, US

Coordinates: 40°18′00″N 76°30′59″W

- Township
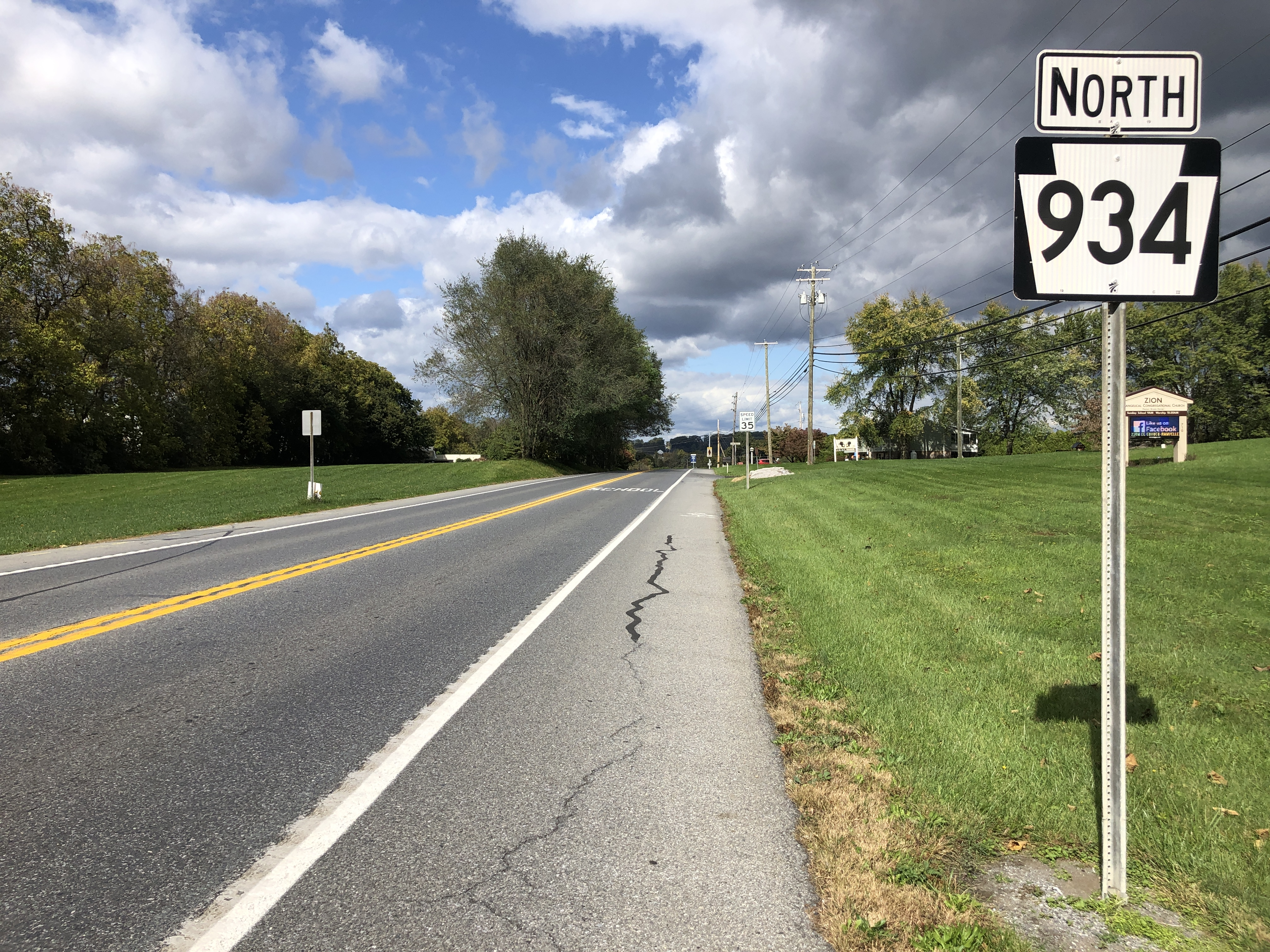
- PA 934 in South Annville Township

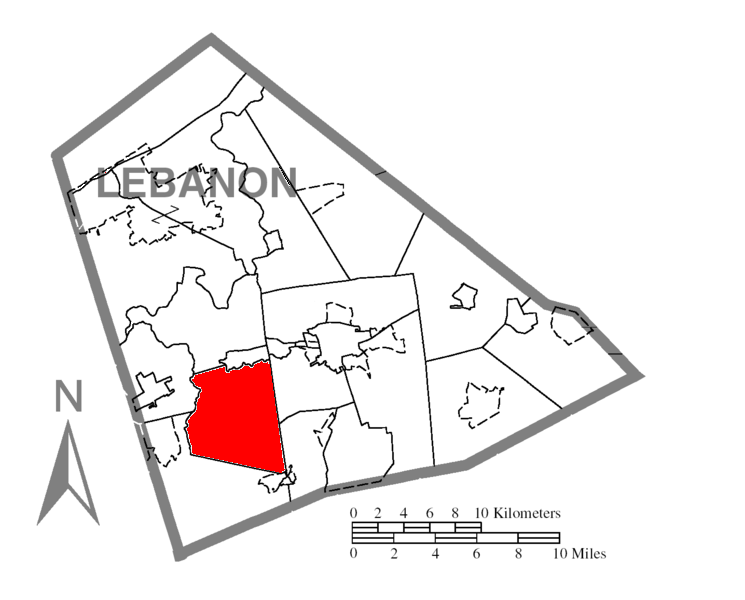
- Location in Lebanon County, Pennsylvania

- Map of Lebanon County, Pennsylvania
- Country: United States
- State: Pennsylvania
- County: Lebanon
- Incorporated: 1845

Area
  - Total: 19.47 sq mi (50.43 km^{2})
  - Land: 19.47 sq mi (50.43 km^{2})
  - Water: 0 sq mi (0.00 km^{2})

Population (2020)
  - Total: 3,426 ▲
  - Estimate (2021): 3,429
  - Density: 151.7/sq mi (58.58/km^{2})
- Time zone: UTC-5 (Eastern (EST))
  - Summer (DST): UTC-4 (EDT)
- Area code: 717
- FIPS code: 42-075-71928
- Website: www.southannville.com

Historical population
| Census | Pop. | Note | %± |
|---|---|---|---|
| 2000 | 2,946 | | — |
| 2010 | 2,850 | | −3.3% |
| 2020 | 3,426 | | 20.2% |
| 2021 (est.) | 3,429 | | 0.1% |
U.S. Decennial Census

South Annville Township is a township in Lebanon County, Pennsylvania, United States. It is part of the Lebanon, Pennsylvania Metropolitan Statistical Area. The population was 3,426 at the 2020 census.

== History ==
The Annville Historic District and Biever House at Annville are listed on the National Register of Historic Places.

== Geography ==
According to the U.S. Census Bureau, the township has a total area of 19.6 square miles (50.9 km^{2}), all land. It includes the unincorporated communities of Mount Pleasant and Fontana, and part of the community of Mount Wilson is on the southern border.

Annville-Cleona High School is in the northern part of the township. Umberger's Mill is a point of interest - it is one of the last family owned mills in the United States.

== Demographics ==
As of the census of 2000, there were 2,946 people, 1,095 households, and 849 families residing in the township. The population density was 149.9 inhabitants per square mile (57.9/km^{2}). There were 1,129 housing units at an average density of 57.5 per square mile (22.2/km^{2}). The racial makeup of the township was 97.90% White, 0.37% African American, 0.03% Native American, 0.75% Asian, 0.51% from other races, and 0.44% from two or more races. Hispanic or Latino of any race were 1.26% of the population.

There were 1,095 households, out of which 31.1% had children under the age of 18 living with them, 68.2% were married couples living together, 6.9% had a female householder with no husband present, and 22.4% were non-families. 19.4% of all households were made up of individuals, and 8.3% had someone living alone who was 65 years of age or older. The average household size was 2.61 and the average family size was 3.00.

In the township, the population was spread out, with 23.5% under the age of 18, 7.1% from 18 to 24, 25.5% from 25 to 44, 28.8% from 45 to 64, and 15.2% who were 65 years of age or older. The median age was 41 years. For every 100 females there were 96.0 males. For every 100 females age 18 and over, there were 93.5 males.

The median income for a household in the township was $51,168, and the median income for a family was $54,813. Males had a median income of $37,463 versus $26,591 for females. The per capita income for the township was $22,040. About 3.5% of families and 3.8% of the population were below the poverty line, including 3.0% of those under age 18 and 8.5% of those age 65 or over.

== Residents ==
- J. A. Yordy was born and raised in the township
