= Brandywine Creek (Quittapahilla Creek tributary) =

Brandywine Creek (Quittapahilla Creek)

Location
- Country: United States of America

Physical characteristics
- Source
  - coordinates: 40°22′10″N 76°23′43″W
- Mouth
  - location: Quittapahilla Creek
  - coordinates: 40°20′17″N 76°26′10″W
  - elevation: 456 ft (139 m)

Brandywine Creek is a 3.0-mile-long (4.8 km) tributary of Quittapahilla Creek in Lebanon County, Pennsylvania, in the United States.

It rises in northeastern Lebanon County and flows southwest through Lebanon, through the limestone hill country south of the Appalachian Mountains. It joins Quittapahilla Creek west of the center of Lebanon.

Stovers Dam 40°21′13″N 76°24′38″W and Recreation Area is the principal landmark along Brandywine Creek.

== See also ==
- List of rivers of Pennsylvania
