= J. A. Yordy =

American politician

Jacob A. Yordy (died June 29, 1874) was an American state senator in Alabama. He served two terms in the Alabama House of Representatives from 1868–1872.

He was born in and grew up in South Annville Township, Pennsylvania. He lived in Ohio before the Civil War. He served with Company I of the Ohio "regikent volunteers". He was one of the Northerners serving in the south during the Reconstruction era. He was a Republican. He wrote a message about election disturbances.

John T. Foster preceded him as a state senator. Yordy served from 1868 to 1872 and was succeeded by William G. Little Jr. He represented Sumter County, Alabama. He was one of the signatories of a letter to the U.S. Senate protesting the election of George Goldthwaite. The letter said Goldthwaite did not receive a majority of votes from legitimately elected state legislators.

He was said to be a U.S. customs house employee in Mobile during testimony about officials holding more than one public office at the same time.

Sarah Woolfolk Wiggins wrote "J. A. Yordy and Alabama Ostracism of Republicans".published in the July 1967 edition of the Alabama Review.

He died in Mobile, Alabama June 29, 1874.
