= Union Water Works, Pennsylvania =

Unincorporated community in Pennsylvania, US

Water Works Alger
- Unincorporated area
- Union Water Works
- Location of Union Water Works in Pennsylvania
- Coordinates: 40.489846°N 76.401453°W
- Country: United States
- State: Pennsylvania
- County: Lebanon County

Union Water Works, commonly known as Water Works, is an unincorporated community in North Annville Township, Lebanon County, Pennsylvania, United States.

The community was originally called Alger, located at a crossing of the Swatara Creek. During the early 19th century it became a point of interest along the Union Canal, which connected the Schuylkill River to the Susquehanna River. It was here that the canal company built a pumping station, the water works, to lift water from the Swatara Creek to feed the canal, which ran parallel from this point to the Susquehanna River at Middletown. The Union water works was such a major feat of engineering, that Union Water Works quickly became the de facto name of the village as well. The canal began operation in 1827, and between 1828 and 1830 a branch canal was built north to Pine Grove to service the mines of the Southern Schuylkill Anthracite Coal Region of Pennsylvania. The branch canal connected to the main canal at the Water Works Dam. The business of the canal company included the pumping station, a weigh station and toll house, several nearby locks, and the ice dam in winter. Local residents established a hotel, a general store, a grain mill, a lumber yard, a community park, and the Union Water Works Church.

The Union Canal ceased operation in 1885, and evidence of the canal at Water Works has nearly disappeared. The dam was destroyed in 1972 when flooding from Hurricane Agnes caused the earthwork dam to break, spilling the entire reservoir into the Swatara Creek. Today, some stone masonry of the weigh station, towpath, and nearby canal locks remain, but they are all on private property and are essentially unrecognizable to the casual observer. The former Mount Union Hotel, which became the Peiffer Hotel, is still inhabited, now as an apartment building. The church continues to serve the community as Waterworks Mennonite Fellowship. The Union Water Works Fire Company continues to serve the area. The community park which is called Waterworks Grove has a little bridge and old swing. The last remaining which is perhaps the last link to the Union Canal era is the sign on tree in the park. Now the park is on private property, which is perhaps the last link to the Union Canal era.
