= Bellegrove, Pennsylvania =

Unincorporated community in Pennsylvania, US

Coordinates: 40°22′01″N 76°32′56″W

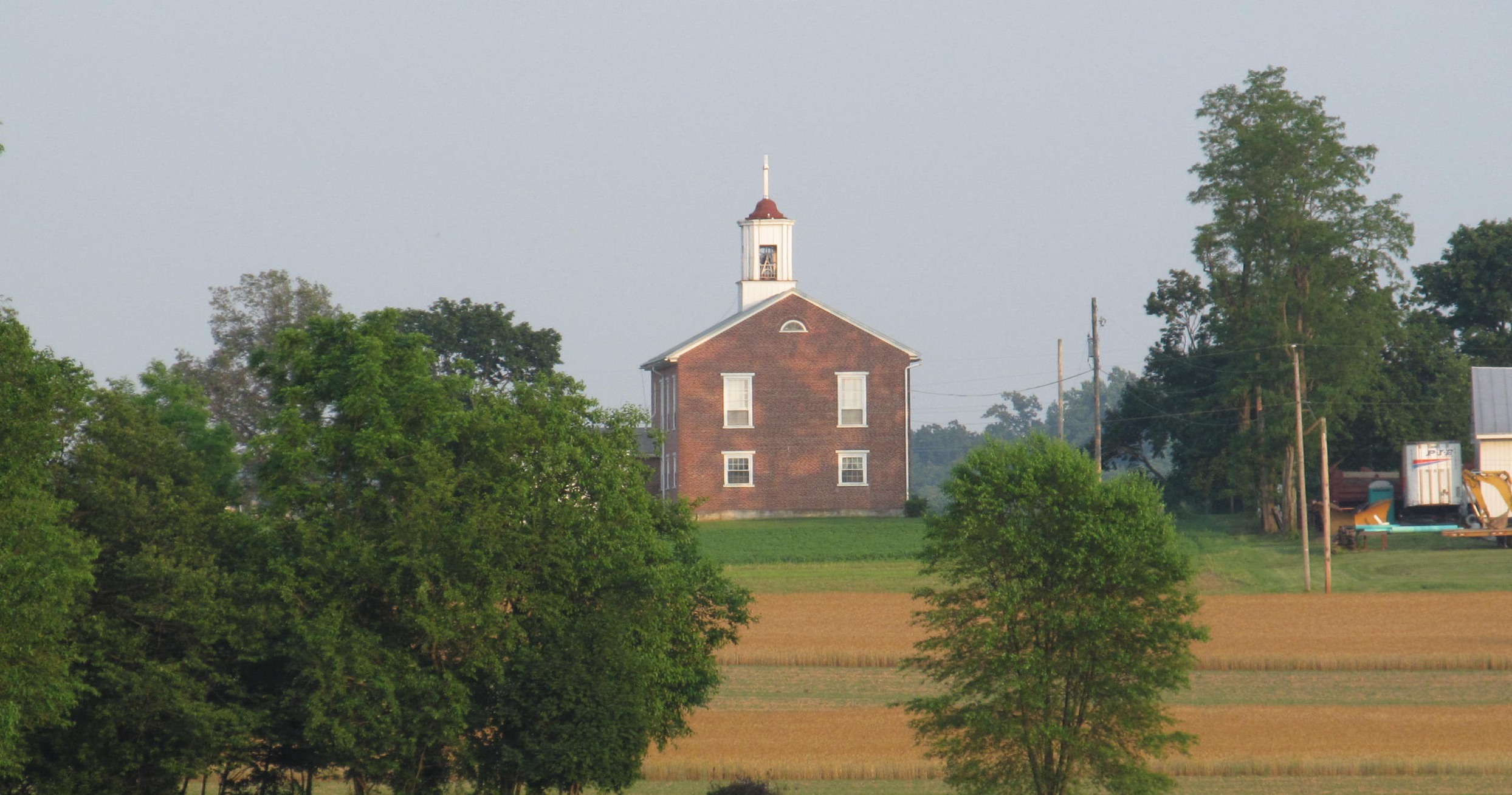

Bellegrove, originally known as Belleview, is a residential village in North Annville Township, Lebanon County, Pennsylvania, United States.
