= Cleona, Pennsylvania =

Borough in Pennsylvania, US

- Borough
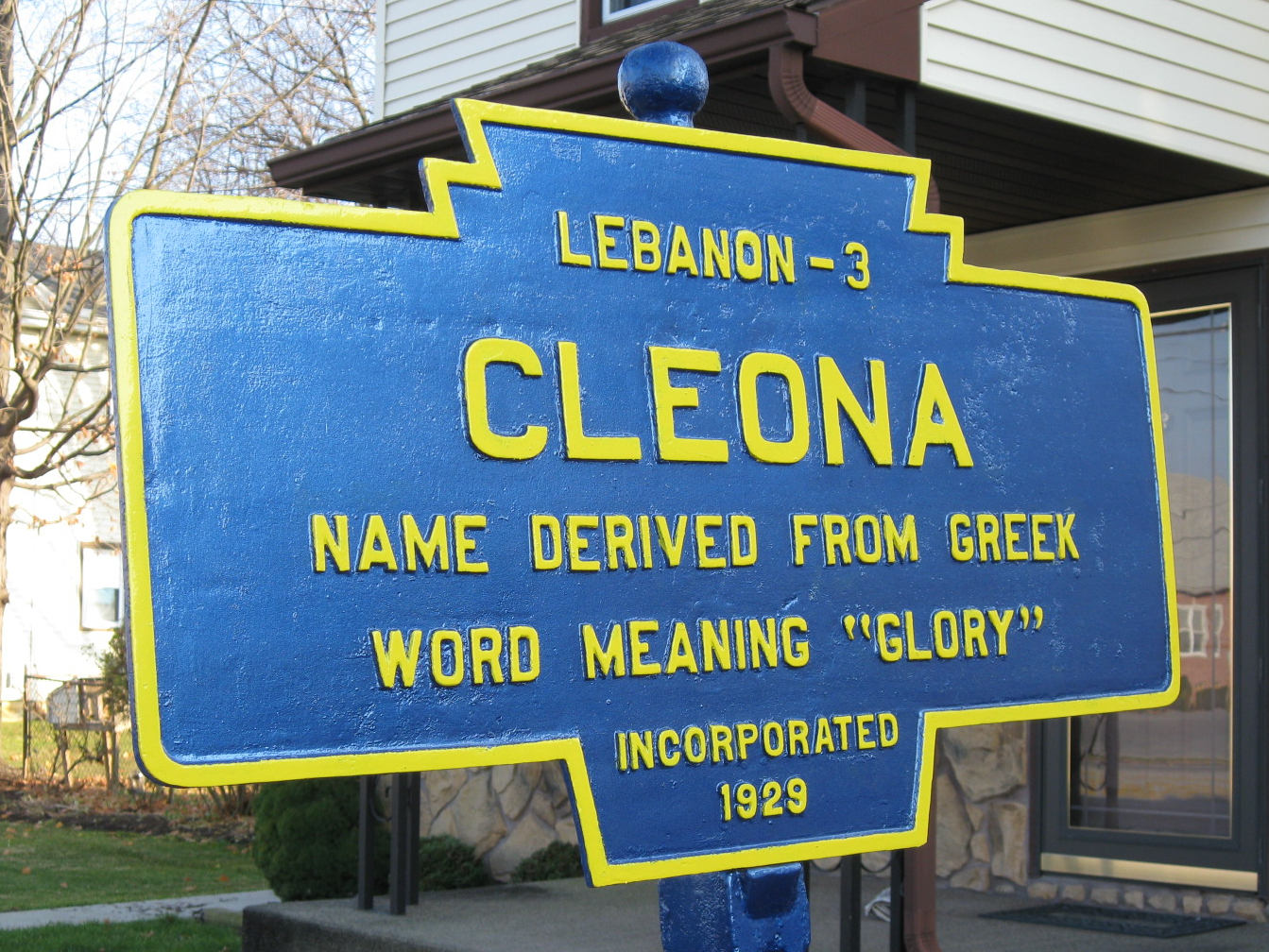

- Location in Lebanon County, Pennsylvania

- Location in Pennsylvania Location in the United States
- Coordinates: 40°20′14″N 76°28′29″W
- Country: United States
- State: Pennsylvania
- County: Lebanon
- Settled: 1883
- Incorporated: 1929

Government
  - Type: Borough Council
  - Mayor: Matt Zechman
  - Council President: Jim O'Connor
  - Council Vice President: Patrick Haley
  - Borough Officers: List: Public Safety – Tricia Springer; Property – Robert Moyer; Parks & Recreation – Patrick Haley; Code Enforcement – Larry Minnich; Highway – Samuel Wengert Jr.; Finance - Matthew Urban

Area
  - Total: 0.83 sq mi (2.16 km^{2})
  - Land: 0.83 sq mi (2.16 km^{2})
  - Water: 0 sq mi (0.00 km^{2})
- Elevation: 443 ft (135 m)

Population (2020)
  - Total: 2,013
  - Density: 2,414.8/sq mi (932.35/km^{2})
- Time zone: UTC-5 (Eastern (EST))
  - Summer (DST): UTC-4 (EDT)
- ZIP code: 17042
- Area code: 717
- FIPS code: 42-14160
- Website: www.cleonaborough.org

Cleona is a borough in Lebanon County, Pennsylvania, United States. It is part of the Lebanon, Pennsylvania Metropolitan Statistical Area. The population was 2,005 at the 2020 census.

== Geography ==
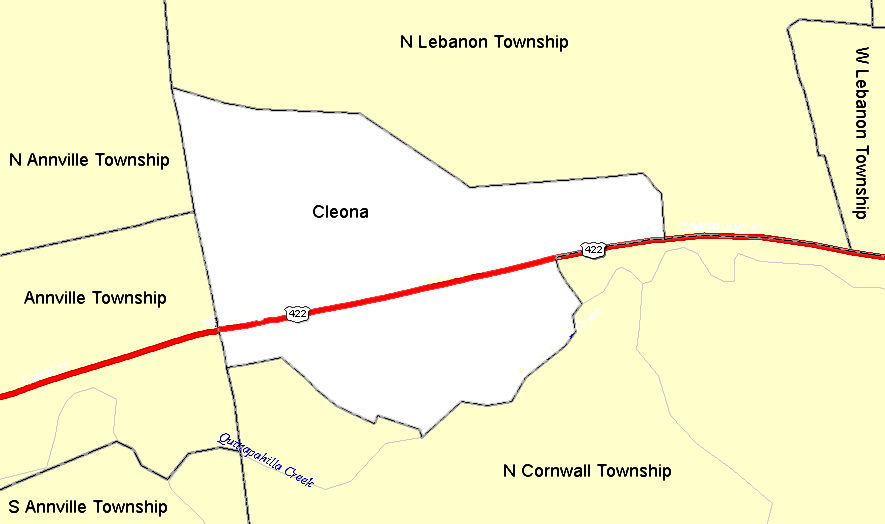
Border detail of Cleona and surrounding municipalities

Cleona is located at 40°20′14″N 76°28′29″W (40.337241, -76.474683).

According to the United States Census Bureau, the borough has a total area of 0.9 square miles (2.3 km^{2}), all land.

Cleona is bordered to the north and east by North Lebanon Township (1.7 mi), to the south by North Cornwall Township (1.86 mi), and to the west by North Annville Township (0.37 mi) and Annville Township (0.47 mi).

== Demographics ==
Historical population
Census	Pop.	Note	%±
1930	968		—
1940	1,108		14.5%
1950	1,483		33.8%
1960	1,988		34.1%
1970	2,040		2.6%
1980	2,003		−1.8%
1990	2,322		15.9%
2000	2,148		−7.5%
2010	2,080		−3.2%
2020	2,013		−3.2%
2021 (est.)	2,008	▼	−0.2%

As of the census of 2000, there were 2,148 people, 879 households, and 639 families residing in the borough. The population density was 2,464.9 inhabitants per square mile (951.7/km^{2}). There were 913 housing units at an average density of 1,047.7 per square mile (404.5/km^{2}). The racial makeup of the borough was 96.55% White, 1.02% African American, 0.05% Native American, 1.21% Asian, 0.05% Pacific Islander, 0.28% from other races, and 0.84% from two or more races. Hispanic or Latino of any race were 1.35% of the population.

There were 879 households, out of which 33.6% had children under the age of 18 living with them, 61.1% were married couples living together, 8.2% had a female householder with no husband present, and 27.3% were non-families. 24.1% of all households were made up of individuals, and 10.5% had someone living alone who was 65 years of age or older. The average household size was 2.44 and the average family size was 2.86.

In the borough the population was spread out, with 23.9% under the age of 18, 7.0% from 18 to 24, 32.4% from 25 to 44, 21.9% from 45 to 64, and 14.8% who were 65 years of age or older. The median age was 38 years. For every 100 females there were 96.9 males. For every 100 females age 18 and over, there were 94.0 males.

The median income for a household in the borough was $44,761, and the median income for a family was $52,328. Males had a median income of $34,574 versus $23,944 for females. The per capita income for the borough was $21,090. About 2.8% of families and 3.4% of the population were below the poverty line, including 1.6% of those under age 18 and 1.6% of those age 65 or over.
