= Timber Hills, Pennsylvania =

Unincorporated community in Pennsylvania, US

- Census-designated place
- Location in Pennsylvania Location in the United States
- Coordinates: 40°14′54″N 76°28′47″W
- Country: United States
- State: Pennsylvania
- County: Lebanon
- Township: South Londonderry

Area
  - Total: 0.69 sq mi (1.79 km^{2})
  - Land: 0.67 sq mi (1.73 km^{2})
  - Water: 0.023 sq mi (0.06 km^{2})
- Elevation: 705 ft (215 m)

Population (2010)
  - Total: 360
  - Density: 539/sq mi (208.1/km^{2})
- Time zone: UTC-5 (Eastern (EST))
  - Summer (DST): UTC-4 (EDT)
- FIPS code: 42-76724
- GNIS feature ID: 1852865

Timber Hills is an unincorporated community and census-designated place (CDP) in Lebanon County, Pennsylvania, United States. The population was 360 at the 2010 census.

== Geography ==
Timber Hills is located in southwestern Lebanon County at 40°14′56″N 76°28′40″W (40.248972, -76.477786), in the southeastern part of South Londonderry Township. It is bordered to the east by the borough of Mount Gretna.

Pennsylvania Route 117 forms the southern edge of the CDP; the highway leads northeastward 5 miles (8 km) to Cornwall and west 2 miles (3 km) to Colebrook. Lebanon, the county seat, is 9 miles (14 km) northeast of Timber Hills.

According to the United States Census Bureau, the CDP has a total area of 0.69 square miles (1.8 km^{2}), of which 0.02 square miles (0.06 km^{2}), or 3.16%, are water. Conewago Lake is in the southern part of the CDP. Its outlet, Conewago Creek, is a southwest-flowing tributary of the Susquehanna River.

== Demographics ==
As of the census of 2000, there were 329 people, 157 households, and 113 families residing in the CDP. The population density was 433.9 inhabitants per square mile (167.5/km^{2}). There were 166 housing units at an average density of 218.9 per square mile (84.5/km^{2}). The racial makeup of the CDP was 99.09% White, 0.30% Asian, 0.30% from other races, and 0.30% from two or more races. Hispanic or Latino of any race were 0.61% of the population.

There were 157 households, out of which 15.9% had children under the age of 18 living with them, 68.8% were married couples living together, 2.5% had a female householder with no husband present, and 27.4% were non-families. 25.5% of all households were made up of individuals, and 15.9% had someone living alone who was 65 years of age or older. The average household size was 2.10 and the average family size was 2.47.

In the CDP, the population was spread out, with 13.4% under the age of 18, 2.7% from 18 to 24, 16.7% from 25 to 44, 41.9% from 45 to 64, and 25.2% who were 65 years of age or older. The median age was 53 years. For every 100 females, there were 90.2 males. For every 100 females age 18 and over, there were 82.7 males.

The median income for a household in the CDP was $55,938, and the median income for a family was $81,906. Males had a median income of $58,333 versus $38,750 for females. The per capita income for the CDP was $34,974. None of the population or families were below the poverty line.
