= North Annville Township, Pennsylvania =

Township in Pennsylvania, US

Coordinates: 40°21′00″N 76°32′59″W

- Township
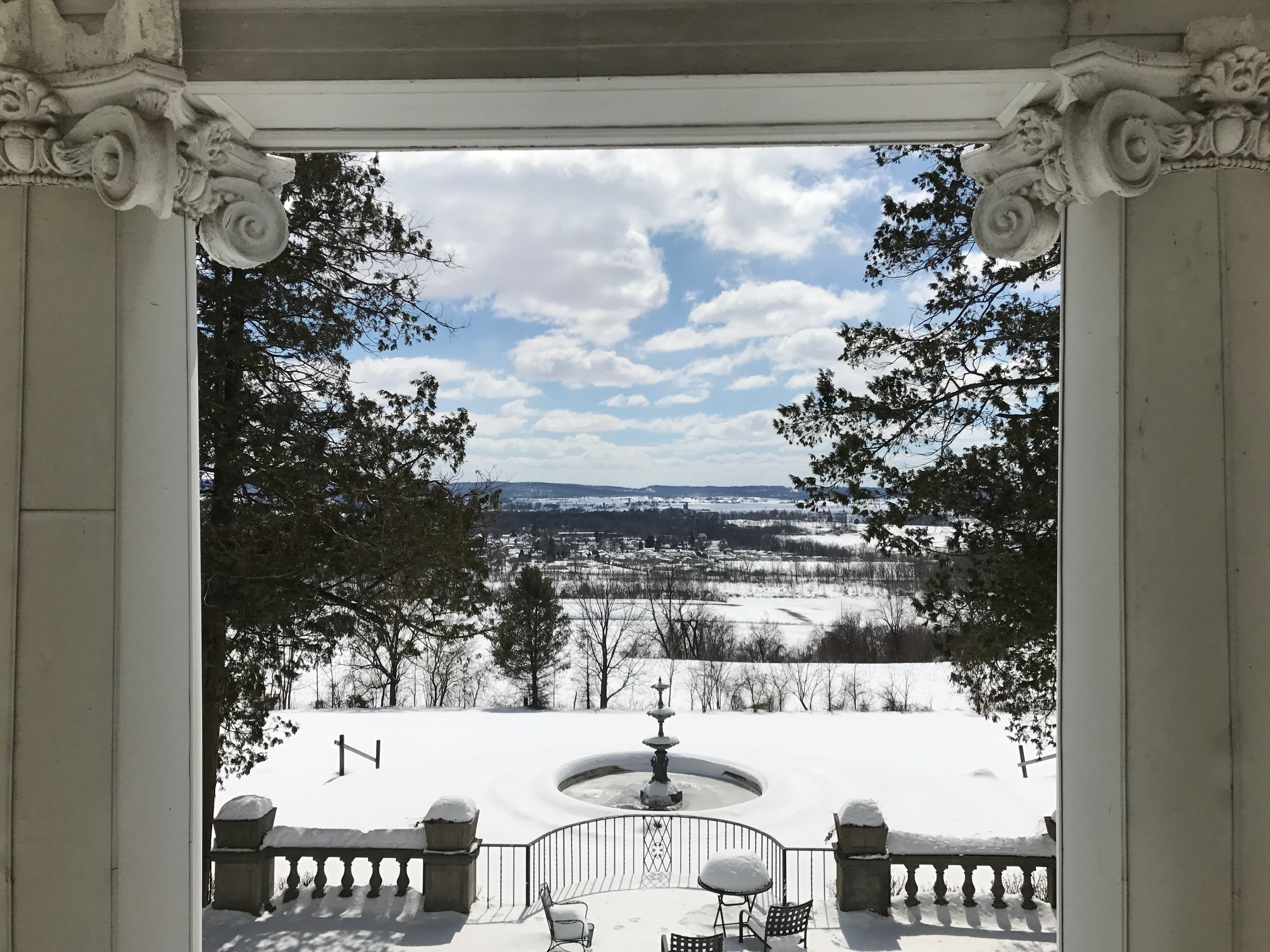
- View of a snowy landscape in the township

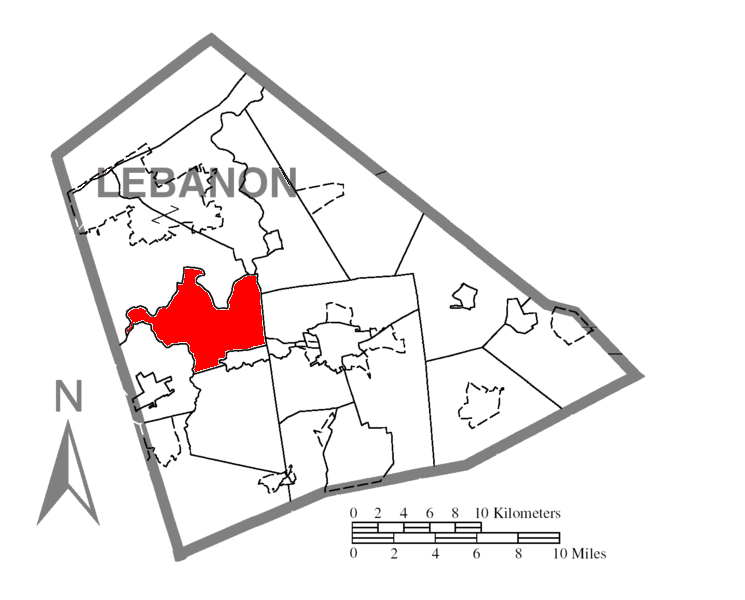
- Location in Lebanon County, Pennsylvania

- Map of Lebanon County, Pennsylvania
- Country: United States
- State: Pennsylvania
- County: Lebanon
- Incorporated: 1845

Area
  - Total: 17.29 sq mi (44.78 km^{2})
  - Land: 17.25 sq mi (44.68 km^{2})
  - Water: 0.039 sq mi (0.10 km^{2})

Population (2020)
  - Total: 2,271 ▼
  - Estimate (2021): 2,274
  - Density: 143.6/sq mi (55.46/km^{2})
- Time zone: UTC-5 (Eastern (EST))
  - Summer (DST): UTC-4 (EDT)
- Area code: 717
- FIPS code: 42-075-54720
- Website: nannvilletwp.com

Historical population
Census	Pop.	Note	%±
2000	2,279		—
2010	2,381		4.5%
2020	2,271		−4.6%
2021 (est.)	2,274		0.1%
U.S. Decennial Census

North Annville Township is a second-class township in Lebanon County, Pennsylvania, United States, governed by a three-member Board of Supervisors. The population was 2,271 at the 2020 census. It is part of the Lebanon, PA Metropolitan Statistical Area. Postal service is provided via rural delivery from Annville and Lebanon. There are no public schools in North Annville Township. The North Annville Elementary School closed at the end of the 2010–2011 school year, but the building has been repurposed. North Annville Township is served by Annville-Cleona School District.

== Geography ==
According to the United States Census Bureau, the township has a total area of 17.5 square miles (45.2 km^{2}), of which 17.4 square miles (45.1 km^{2}) is land and 0.04 square mile (0.1 km^{2}) (0.23%) is water. The township includes the unincorporated communities of Bellegrove, Union Water Works, and Steelstown.

== Demographics ==
As of the census of 2000, there were 2,279 people, 828 households, and 646 families residing in the township. The population density was 130.9 inhabitants per square mile (50.5/km^{2}). There were 861 housing units at an average density of 49.4 per square mile (19.1/km^{2}). The racial makeup of the township was 98.99% White, 0.18% Native American, 0.09% Asian, 0.04% Pacific Islander, 0.04% from other races, and 0.66% from two or more races. Hispanic or Latino of any race were 0.75% of the population.

There were 828 households, out of which 34.4% had children under the age of 18 living with them, 69.3% were married couples living together, 5.1% had a female householder with no husband present, and 21.9% were non-families. 19.0% of all households were made up of individuals, and 7.6% had someone living alone who was 65 years of age or older. The average household size was 2.72 and the average family size was 3.13.

In the township the population was spread out, with 26.1% under the age of 18, 6.9% from 18 to 24, 28.6% from 25 to 44, 24.2% from 45 to 64, and 14.2% who were 65 years of age or older. The median age was 40 years. For every 100 females, there were 97.3 males. For every 100 females age 18 and over, there were 102.2 males.

The median income for a household in the township was $49,716, and the median income for a family was $56,250. Males had a median income of $34,034 versus $25,179 for females. The per capita income for the township was $20,593. About 5.1% of families and 5.5% of the population were below the poverty line, including 6.2% of those under age 18 and 8.6% of those age 65 or over.

== History ==
The first European settlers were German-Swiss Protestants, particularly Lutherans, who began clearing and farming the land in the early 18th century. Even today, most residents can trace their ancestry to one or more of those early settlers. The native Indian population was quickly driven north into the Appalachian Mountains, although conflicts between natives and settlers were recorded as late as 1756. This area was originally part of Lebanon Township of Lancaster County, then Annville Township of Lebanon County. North Annville became a separate township in 1845, and its borders have remained unchanged since then, except for the southern edge, which was incorporated into the township of Annville in 1912. The main industry has always been farming. Many of the farms, dairy and livestock, have passed from generation to generation for more than a hundred years. The countryside is dotted with small residential communities, the largest of which are Bellegrove, Water Works, and Steelstown. Apart from a few family-owned businesses, the only major employer is a limestone quarry, which mines the high-calcium geological formation known as the Annville Belt.
