= South Lebanon Township, Pennsylvania =

Township in Pennsylvania, US

Coordinates: 40°18′00″N 76°22′28″W

- Township
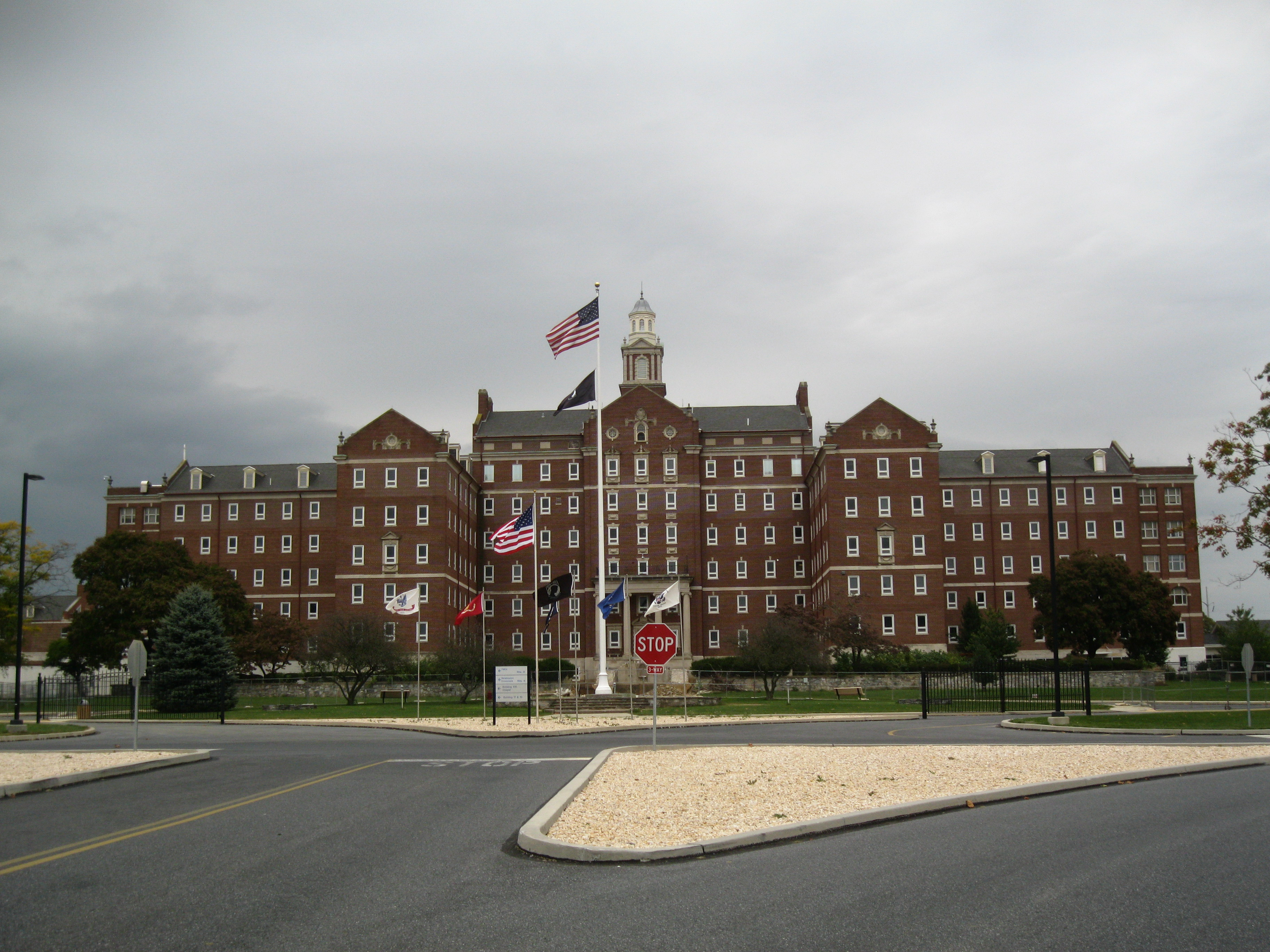
- Lebanon VA Medical Center
- Motto: "A Community of Service"
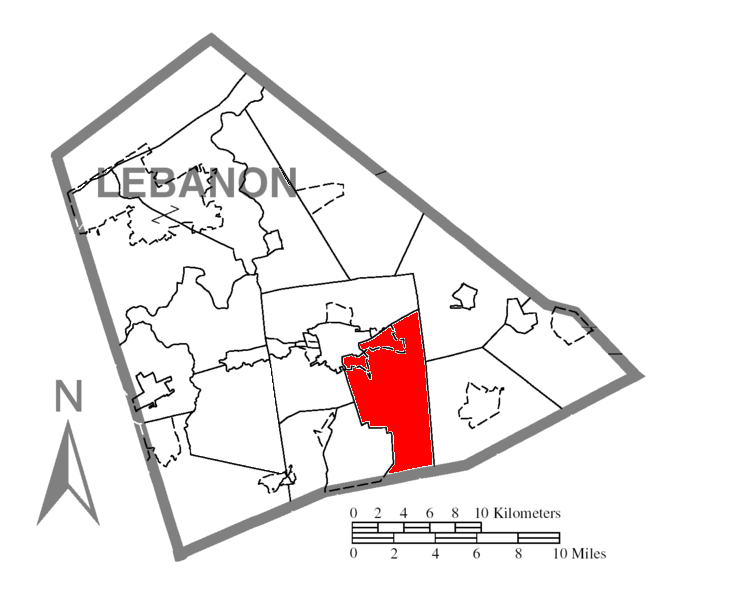
- Location in Lebanon County, Pennsylvania

- Map of Lebanon County, Pennsylvania
- Country: United States
- State: Pennsylvania
- County: Lebanon
- Incorporated: 1840

Area
  - Total: 21.74 sq mi (56.31 km^{2})
  - Land: 21.67 sq mi (56.13 km^{2})
  - Water: 0.069 sq mi (0.18 km^{2})

Population (2020)
  - Total: 10,456 ▲
  - Estimate (2021): 10,472
  - Density: 454/sq mi (175.3/km^{2})
- Time zone: UTC-5 (Eastern (EST))
  - Summer (DST): UTC-4 (EDT)
- ZIP code: 17042
- Area code: 717
- FIPS code: 42-075-72288
- Website: twp.south-lebanon.pa.us

Historical population
Census	Pop.	Note	%±
1960	6,584		—
1970	7,706		17.0%
1980	7,431		−3.6%
1990	7,491		0.8%
2000	8,383		11.9%
2010	9,463		12.9%
2020	10,456		10.5%
2021 (est.)	10,472		0.2%
U.S. Decennial Census

South Lebanon Township is a township in Lebanon County, Pennsylvania, United States. It is part of the Lebanon, PA Metropolitan Statistical Area. The population was 10,456 at the 2020 census.

== History ==
Lebanon Township was divided to form North Lebanon Township and South Lebanon Township in 1840.

== Geography ==
According to the United States Census Bureau, the township has a total area of 21.8 square miles (56.6 km^{2}), of which 21.8 square miles (56.4 km^{2}) is land and 0.1 square mile (0.2 km^{2}) (0.32%) is water.

The township includes three census-designated places, unincorporated communities which are all in the northern part of the township: Avon, Hebron, and Lebanon South.

== Demographics ==
At the 2010 census there were 9,463 people, 3,429 households, and 2,550 families in the township. The population density was 434.1 inhabitants per square mile (167.6/km^{2}). There were 3,604 housing units at an average density of 165.3 per square mile (63.8/km^{2}). The racial makeup of the township was 95.73% White, 1.57% African American, 0.10% Native American, 0.95% Asian, 0.01% Pacific Islander, 0.99% from other races, and 0.64% from two or more races. Hispanic or Latino of any race were 3.04%.

There were 2,920 households, 31.6% had children under the age of 18 living with them, 64.9% were married couples living together, 7.6% had a female householder with no husband present, and 24.5% were non-families. 20.7% of households were made up of individuals, and 10.2% were one person aged 65 or older. The average household size was 2.54 and the average family size was 2.95.

In the township the population was spread out, with 21.2% under the age of 18, 6.5% from 18 to 24, 27.1% from 25 to 44, 23.9% from 45 to 64, and 21.4% 65 or older. The median age was 42 years. For every 100 females there were 99.5 males. For every 100 females age 18 and over, there were 96.9 males.

The median household income was $46,268 and the median family income was $52,726. Males had a median income of $36,987 versus $26,335 for females. The per capita income for the township was $19,903. About 3.7% of families and 5.2% of the population were below the poverty line, including 7.6% of those under age 18 and 5.2% of those age 65 or over.
