= North Cornwall Township, Pennsylvania =

Township in Pennsylvania, United States

Coordinates: 40°19′00″N 76°26′59″W

- Township
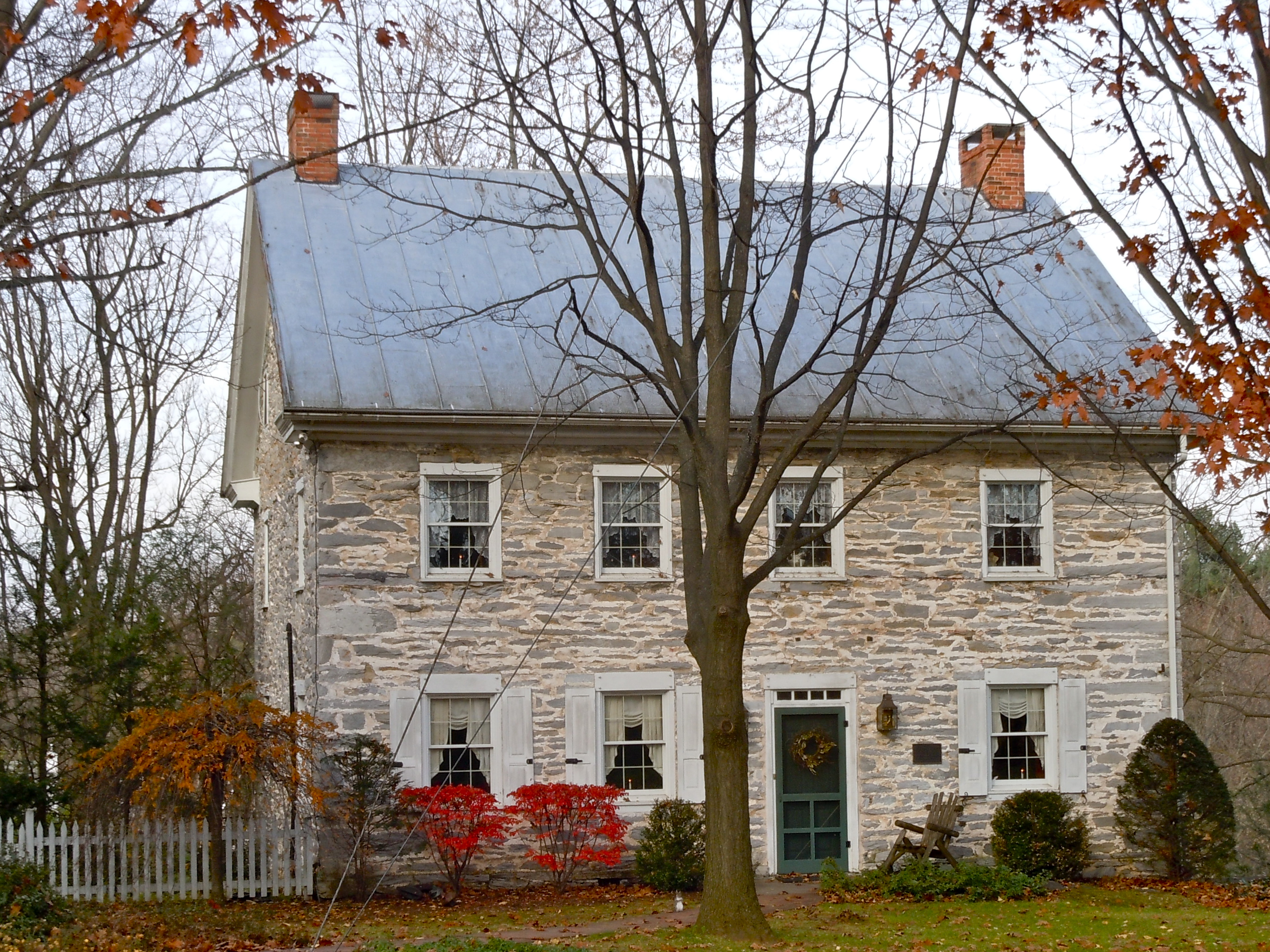
- The Gloninger Estate, built 1785

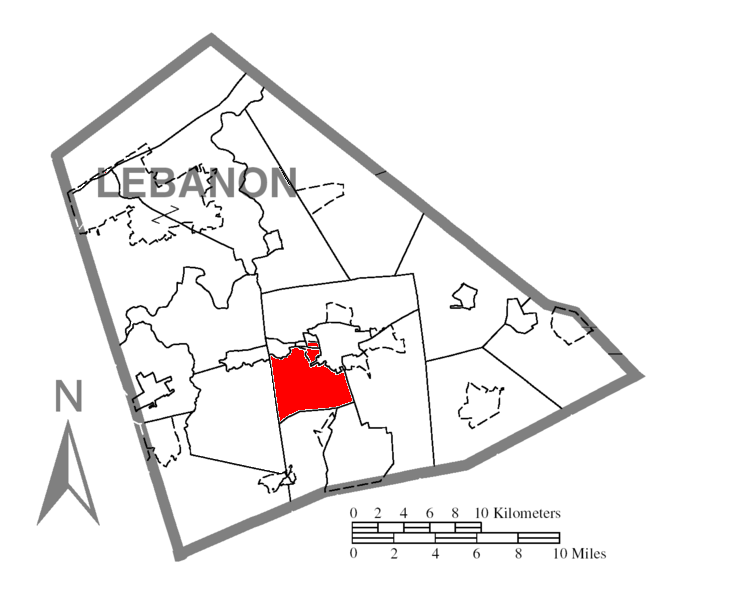
- Location in Lebanon County, Pennsylvania

- Map of Lebanon County, Pennsylvania
- Country: United States
- State: Pennsylvania
- County: Lebanon
- Settled: 1737

Area
  - Total: 9.50 sq mi (24.60 km^{2})
  - Land: 9.50 sq mi (24.60 km^{2})
  - Water: 0 sq mi (0.00 km^{2})

Population (2020)
  - Total: 8,511 ▲
  - Estimate (2021): 8,804
  - Density: 828/sq mi (319.6/km^{2})
- Time zone: UTC-5 (Eastern (EST))
  - Summer (DST): UTC-4 (EDT)
- Area code: 717
- FIPS code: 42-075-54928
- Website: www.nctown.org

Historical population
Census	Pop.	Note	%±
2000	6,403		—
2010	7,553		18.0%
2020	8,511		12.7%
2021 (est.)	8,804		3.4%
U.S. Decennial Census

North Cornwall Township is a township in Lebanon County, Pennsylvania, United States. The population of North Cornwall Township was 8,511 as of the 2020 census. It is part of the Lebanon, PA Metropolitan Statistical Area.

== History ==
The Gloninger Estate was added to the National Register of Historic Places in 1980.

== Geography ==
According to the United States Census Bureau, the township has a total area of 9.5 square miles (24.7 km^{2}), all land. The census-designated place of Pleasant Hill is in the northern part of the township, between the city of Lebanon to the east and the borough of Cleona to the west.

== Demographics ==
As of the census of 2000, there were 6,403 people, 2,467 households, and 1,751 families residing in the township. The population density was 672.8 inhabitants per square mile (259.8/km^{2}). There were 2,604 housing units at an average density of 273.6 per square mile (105.6/km^{2}). The racial makeup of the township was 92.10% White, 1.53% African American, 0.14% Native American, 2.28% Asian, 0.06% Pacific Islander, 2.34% from other races, and 1.55% from two or more races. Hispanic or Latino of any race were 5.28% of the population.

There were 2,467 households, out of which 32.1% had children under the age of 18 living with them, 57.2% were married couples living together, 10.1% had a female householder with no husband present, and 29.0% were non-families. 24.2% of all households were made up of individuals, and 11.2% had someone living alone who was 65 years of age or older. The average household size was 2.49 and the average family size was 2.95.

In the township the population was spread out, with 24.3% under the age of 18, 6.9% from 18 to 24, 27.3% from 25 to 44, 23.4% from 45 to 64, and 18.0% who were 65 years of age or older. The median age was 40 years. For every 100 females there were 89.7 males. For every 100 females age 18 and over, there were 86.3 males.

The median income for a household in the township was $45,732, and the median income for a family was $53,551. Males had a median income of $40,036 versus $27,021 for females. The per capita income for the township was $22,244. About 7.1% of families and 8.0% of the population were below the poverty line, including 11.2% of those under age 18 and 4.0% of those age 65 or over.
