= North Lebanon Township, Pennsylvania =

Township in Pennsylvania, US

Coordinates: 40°22′00″N 76°21′59″W

- Township
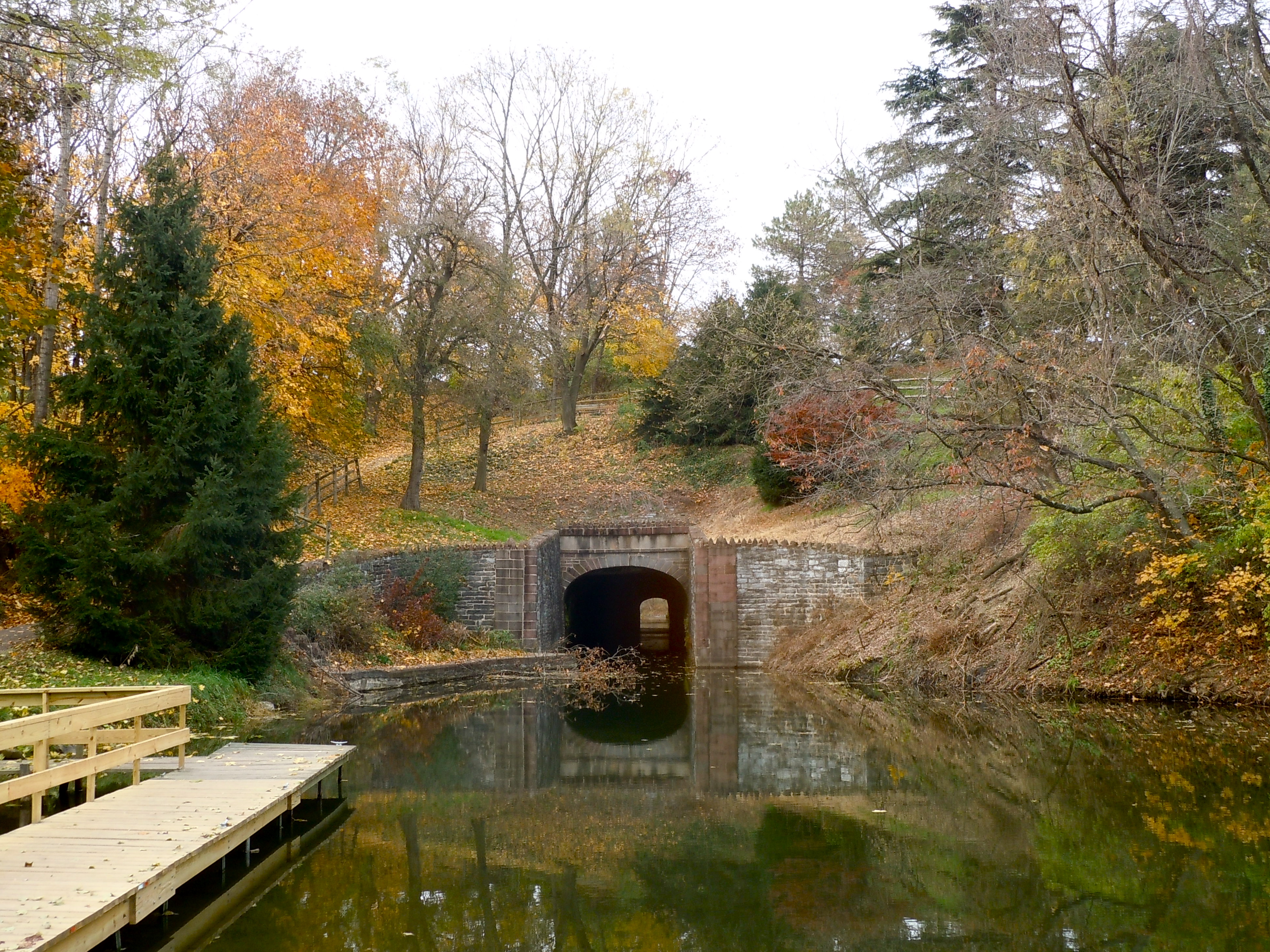
- Tunnel on the Union Canal

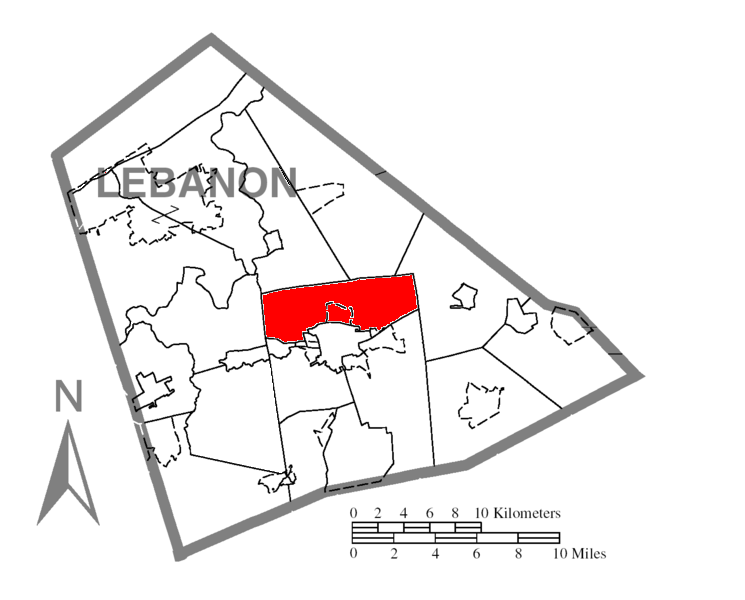
- Location in Lebanon County, Pennsylvania

- Map of Lebanon County, Pennsylvania
- Country: United States
- State: Pennsylvania
- County: Lebanon
- Incorporated: 1840

Area
  - Total: 16.87 sq mi (43.70 km^{2})
  - Land: 16.75 sq mi (43.38 km^{2})
  - Water: 0.12 sq mi (0.32 km^{2})

Population (2020)
  - Total: 12,000 ▲
  - Estimate (2021): 12,018
  - Density: 710.4/sq mi (274.28/km^{2})
- Time zone: UTC-5 (Eastern (EST))
  - Summer (DST): UTC-4 (EDT)
- Area code: 717
- FIPS code: 42-075-55160
- Website: www.northlebanontwppa.gov

Historical population
Census	Pop.	Note	%±
2000	10,629		—
2010	11,429		7.5%
2020	12,000		5.0%
2021 (est.)	12,018		0.2%
U.S. Decennial Census

North Lebanon Township is a township in Lebanon County, Pennsylvania, United States. It is part of the Lebanon, PA Metropolitan Statistical Area. The population was 12,000 at the 2020 census.

== History ==
Lebanon Township was divided to form North Lebanon Township and South Lebanon Township in 1840.

The Union Canal Tunnel was added to the National Register of Historic Places in 1974, and designated a National Historic Landmark in 1994.

== Geography ==
According to the United States Census Bureau, the township has a total area of 17.0 square miles (44.1 km^{2}), of which 16.9 square miles (43.8 km^{2}) is land and 0.1 square mile (0.3 km^{2}) (0.65%) is water.

Three census-designated places are entirely or partially in the township, all bordering the city of Lebanon. Sand Hill is in the center of the township, part of Pleasant Hill is in the southwest, and a small part of Avon is in the southeast.

Ebenezer is an unincorporated community in North Lebanon Township.

The headwaters of the Tulpehocken Creek, the westernmost portion of the Delaware River watershed, are located within the township.

== Demographics ==
As of the 2010 United States census, there were 11,429 people living in the township. The racial makeup of the township was 88.2% White, 1.4% Black, 0.0% Native American, 1.4% Asian, 0.0% Pacific Islander, 0.1% from some other race and 0.9% from two or more races. 8.0% were Hispanic or Latino of any race.

As of the census of 2000, there were 10,629 people, 4,072 households, and 3,159 families living in the township. The population density was 629.0 inhabitants per square mile (242.9/km^{2}). There were 4,234 housing units at an average density of 250.6 per square mile (96.8/km^{2}). The racial makeup of the township was 94.52% White, 1.11% African American, 0.12% Native American, 1.17% Asian, 2.17% from other races, and 0.91% from two or more races. Hispanic or Latino of any race were 5.36% of the population.

There were 4,072 households, out of which 32.2% had children under the age of 18 living with them, 65.1% were married couples living together, 8.9% had a female householder with no husband present, and 22.4% were non-families. 18.2% of all households were made up of individuals, and 8.7% had someone living alone who was 65 years of age or older. The average household size was 2.61 and the average family size was 2.96.

In the township the population was spread out, with 24.0% under the age of 18, 6.7% from 18 to 24, 28.3% from 25 to 44, 27.0% from 45 to 64, and 14.0% who were 65 years of age or older. The median age was 40 years. For every 100 females there were 95.5 males. For every 100 females age 18 and over, there were 91.2 males.

The median income for a household in the township was $43,409, and the median income for a family was $49,517. Males had a median income of $33,590 versus $23,807 for females. The per capita income for the township was $18,654. About 2.9% of families and 4.3% of the population were below the poverty line, including 5.8% of those under age 18 and 6.5% of those age 65 or over.
