= Quittapahilla Creek =

Creek in Pennsylvania, U.S.

Location
- Country: United States

Physical characteristics
- Source
  - coordinates: 40°19′57″N 76°23′17″W
- Mouth
  - coordinates: 40°20′56″N 76°36′54″W Swatara Creek
  - elevation: 356 ft (109 m)

The Quittapahilla Creek (nicknamed the Quittie) is a 16.8-mile-long (27.0 km) tributary of Swatara Creek in south-central Pennsylvania in the United States.

== History ==
The original Lenape name for this waterway is Kuwektəpehəle, which means 'it flows out (ktəpehəle) from the pines (kuwe)'.

By the late twentieth century, the creek had become polluted from steel mill waste. The decline of industry in the region, as well as federal, state, and local efforts, have led to an improvement in water quality. The stream is stocked annually with trout and it has become a popular destination for recreational fly fishing.

== Geography ==
Quittapahilla Creek rises in eastern Lebanon County, flows west-southwest through Lebanon and Annville, and joins Swatara Creek northeast of Palmyra.

== Tributaries ==
- Killinger Creek
- Bachman Run
- Beck Creek
- Snitz Creek
- Brandywine Creek
- Spang Creek

== See also ==
- List of rivers of Pennsylvania
