= Lebanon County, Pennsylvania =

County in Pennsylvania, United States

- County
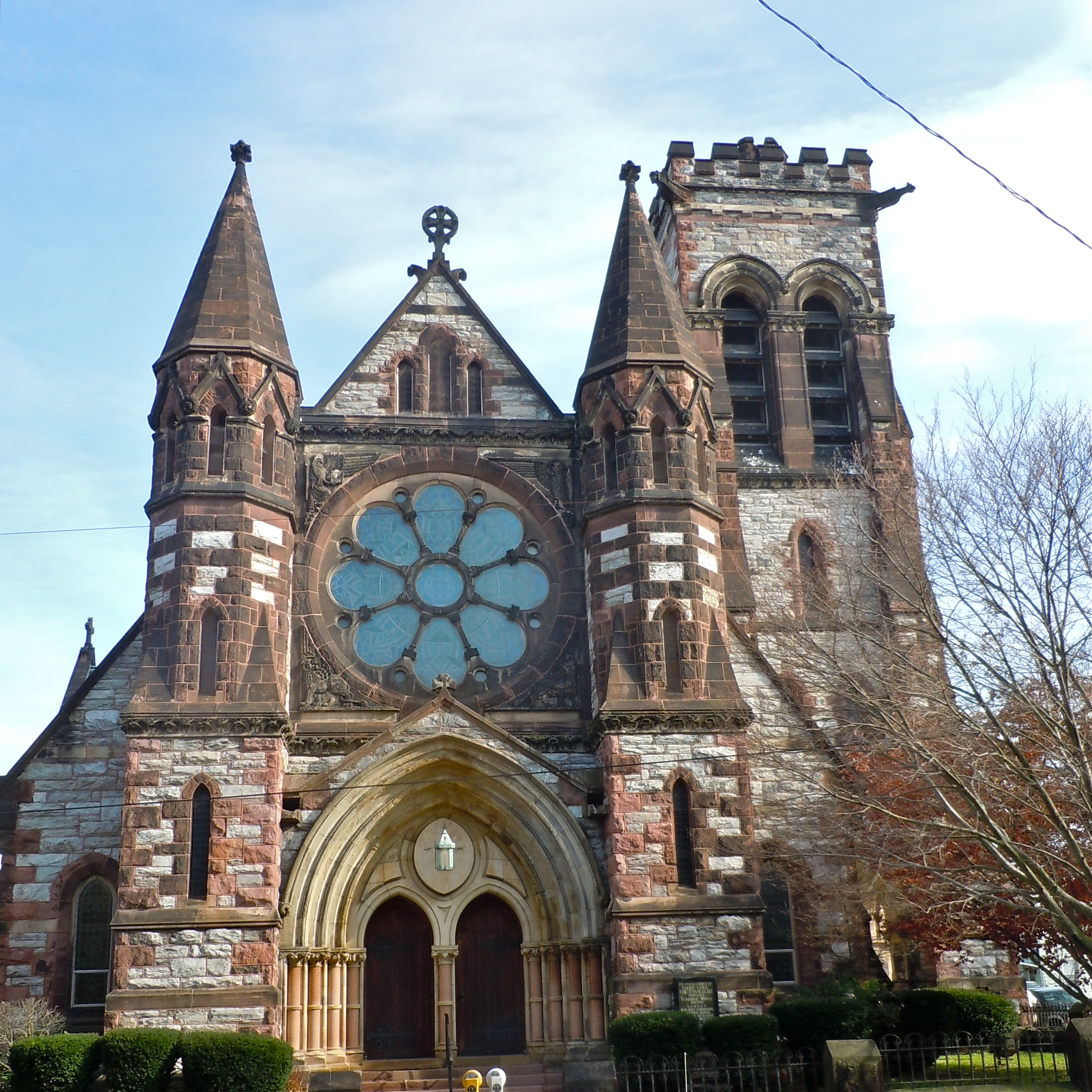
- St. Luke's Episcopal Church

- Seal

- Location within the U.S. state of Pennsylvania
- Coordinates: 40°22′N 76°28′W
- Country: United States
- State: Pennsylvania
- Founded: February 16, 1813
- Seat: Lebanon
- Largest city: Lebanon

Area
  - Total: 362 sq mi (940 km^{2})
  - Land: 362 sq mi (940 km^{2})
  - Water: 0.7 sq mi (1.8 km^{2}) 0.2%

Population (2020)
  - Total: 143,257
  - Estimate (2025): 146,380 ▲
  - Density: 401/sq mi (155/km^{2})
- Time zone: UTC−5 (Eastern)
  - Summer (DST): UTC−4 (EDT)
- Congressional district: 9th
- Website: www.lebanoncountypa.gov

Lebanon County (/ˈlɛbənən/ LEB-ə-nən; Pennsylvania German: Lebnen Kaundi) is a county in the Commonwealth of Pennsylvania, United States. As of the 2020 census, the population was 143,257. Its county seat is the city of Lebanon. It lies 72 miles northwest of Philadelphia, which is the nearest major city. The county is part of the South Central region of the commonwealth. (Note: Includes Lancaster, York, Berks, Dauphin, Cumberland, Franklin, Lebanon, Adams and Perry Counties)

The county was formed from portions of Dauphin and Lancaster counties in 1813, with minor boundary revisions in 1814 and 1821. Lebanon County comprises the Lebanon metropolitan statistical area, which is part of the Harrisburg–York–Lebanon combined statistical area.

== Geography ==
According to the U.S. Census Bureau, the county has a total area of 362 square miles (940 km^{2}), of which 362 square miles (940 km^{2}) is land and 0.7 square miles (1.8 km^{2}) (0.2%) is water. Most of it is drained by the Swatara Creek into the Susquehanna River while some eastern portions are drained by the Tulpehocken Creek (which originates in the county near Myerstown) eastward into the Schuylkill River. It consists in large part of a valley.

=== Climate ===
The county has a hot-summer humid continental climate (Dfa) and the hardiness zone is 7a, except in higher areas north of the Interstate 78 and 81 corridor, where it is 6b. Average monthly temperatures in center-city Lebanon range from 29.4 °F in January to 74.3 °F in July.

=== Adjacent counties ===
- Schuylkill County (northeast)
- Berks County (east)
- Lancaster County (south)
- Dauphin County (west and northwest)

=== Major highways ===
- I-76 / Penna Turnpike
- I-78
- I-81
- US 22
- US 322
- US 422
- PA 72
- PA 117
- PA 241
- PA 341
- PA 343
- PA 419
- PA 443
- PA 501
- PA 645
- PA 897
- PA 934

== Demographics ==
Historical population
Census	Pop.	Note	%±
1820	16,988		—
1830	20,557		21.0%
1840	21,872		6.4%
1850	26,071		19.2%
1860	31,831		22.1%
1870	34,096		7.1%
1880	38,476		12.8%
1890	48,131		25.1%
1900	53,827		11.8%
1910	59,565		10.7%
1920	63,152		6.0%
1930	67,103		6.3%
1940	72,641		8.3%
1950	81,683		12.4%
1960	90,853		11.2%
1970	99,665		9.7%
1980	108,582		8.9%
1990	113,744		4.8%
2000	120,327		5.8%
2010	133,568		11.0%
2020	143,257		7.3%
2025 (est.)	146,380	▲	2.2%
U.S. Decennial Census; 1790-1960 1900-1990; 1990-2000 2010-2019

=== Racial and ethnic composition ===
Lebanon County, Pennsylvania – Racial and ethnic composition Note: the US Census treats Hispanic/Latino as an ethnic category. This table excludes Latinos from the racial categories and assigns them to a separate category. Hispanics/Latinos may be of any race.
Race / Ethnicity (NH = Non-Hispanic)	Pop 1980	Pop 1990	Pop 2000	Pop 2010	Pop 2020	% 1980	% 1990	% 2000	% 2010	% 2020
White alone (NH)	105,792	109,486	111,034	116,010	114,004	97.43%	96.26%	92.28%	86.85%	79.58%
Black or African American alone (NH)	440	615	1,298	2,134	2,555	0.41%	0.54%	1.08%	1.60%	1.78%
Native American or Alaska Native alone (NH)	55	88	114	133	119	0.05%	0.08%	0.09%	0.10%	0.08%
Asian alone (NH)	536	874	1,055	1,504	2,192	0.49%	0.77%	0.88%	1.13%	1.53%
Native Hawaiian or Pacific Islander alone (NH)	x	x	27	30	39	x	x	0.02%	0.02%	0.03%
Other race alone (NH)	154	15	93	111	460	0.14%	0.01%	0.08%	0.08%	0.32%
Mixed race or Multiracial (NH)	x	x	737	1,236	3,540	x	x	0.61%	0.93%	2.47%
Hispanic or Latino (any race)	1,605	2,666	5,969	12,410	20,348	1.48%	2.34%	4.96%	9.29%	14.20%
Total	108,582	113,744	120,327	133,568	143,257	100.00%	100.00%	100.00%	100.00%	100.00%

=== 2020 census ===
As of the 2020 census, the county had a population of 143,257. The median age was 41.8 years. 22.4% of residents were under the age of 18 and 20.8% of residents were 65 years of age or older. For every 100 females there were 95.8 males, and for every 100 females age 18 and over there were 93.2 males age 18 and over.

The racial makeup of the county was 82.7% White, 2.3% Black or African American, 0.2% American Indian and Alaska Native, 1.6% Asian, 0.1% Native Hawaiian and Pacific Islander, 6.6% from some other race, and 6.7% from two or more races. Hispanic or Latino residents of any race comprised 14.2% of the population.

74.6% of residents lived in urban areas, while 25.4% lived in rural areas.

There were 55,808 households in the county, of which 29.2% had children under the age of 18 living in them. Of all households, 51.6% were married-couple households, 16.7% were households with a male householder and no spouse or partner present, and 24.4% were households with a female householder and no spouse or partner present. About 26.4% of all households were made up of individuals and 13.1% had someone living alone who was 65 years of age or older.

There were 59,084 housing units, of which 5.5% were vacant. Among occupied housing units, 70.1% were owner-occupied and 29.9% were renter-occupied. The homeowner vacancy rate was 1.0% and the rental vacancy rate was 5.8%.

=== 2000 census ===
As of the 2000 census, there were 120,327 people and 32,771 families residing in the county. The population density was 332 people per square mile (128 people/km^{2}). There were 49,320 housing units at an average density of 136 units per square mile (53/km^{2}). The racial makeup of the county was 94.46% White, 1.29% Black or African American, 0.13% Native American, 0.89% Asian, 0.04% Pacific Islander, 2.26% from other races, and 0.94% from two or more races. 4.96% of the population were Hispanic or Latino of any race. 45.6% were of German, 11.8% American and 6.1% Irish ancestry. 92.5% spoke English, 4.2% Spanish and 1.1% Pennsylvania Dutch as their first language.

There were 46,551 households, out of which 30.40% had children under the age of 18 living with them, 57.40% were married couples living together, 9.20% had a female householder with no husband present, and 29.60% were non-families. 25.20% of all households were made up of individuals, and 11.10% had someone living alone who was 65 years of age or older. The average household size was 2.49 and the average family size was 2.98.

In the county, the population was spread out, with 23.70% under the age of 18, 8.20% from 18 to 24, 28.00% from 25 to 44, 23.70% from 45 to 64, and 16.40% who were 65 years of age or older. The median age was 39 years. For every 100 females there were 95.00 males. For every 100 females age 18 and over, there were 91.70 males.

== Metropolitan statistical area ==
The U.S. Office of Management and Budget has designated Lebanon County as the Lebanon, PA metropolitan statistical area (MSA). As of the 2010 U.S. census the metropolitan area ranked 16th most populous in the State of Pennsylvania and the 296th most populous in the United States with a population of 133,568. Lebanon County is also a part of the larger Harrisburg–York–Lebanon combined statistical area (CSA), which combines the populations of Lebanon County as well as Adams, Cumberland, Dauphin, Perry, and York counties in Pennsylvania. The combined statistical area ranked 5th largest in the state and 43rd largest in the U.S., with a population of 1,219,422.

== Politics and government ==
United States presidential election results for Lebanon County, Pennsylvania
Year	Republican		Democratic		Third party(ies)	
Year	No.	%	No.	%	No.	%
1880	5,042	60.95%	3,218	38.90%	13	0.16%
1884	5,207	63.45%	2,977	36.28%	22	0.27%
1888	6,096	61.61%	3,670	37.09%	129	1.30%
1892	5,403	59.11%	3,409	37.29%	329	3.60%
1896	7,288	70.60%	2,819	27.31%	216	2.09%
1900	7,089	66.76%	3,050	28.72%	479	4.51%
1904	6,938	70.19%	2,449	24.78%	497	5.03%
1908	6,874	67.08%	2,858	27.89%	515	5.03%
1912	2,378	22.48%	2,972	28.09%	5,230	49.43%
1916	5,876	57.45%	3,821	37.36%	531	5.19%
1920	8,778	70.78%	3,016	24.32%	608	4.90%
1924	9,494	74.27%	2,464	19.28%	825	6.45%
1928	16,841	82.30%	3,278	16.02%	345	1.69%
1932	10,487	58.97%	5,924	33.31%	1,373	7.72%
1936	13,213	48.09%	13,800	50.23%	463	1.69%
1940	13,449	50.08%	13,315	49.58%	93	0.35%
1944	15,206	56.00%	11,818	43.52%	129	0.48%
1948	15,553	61.62%	9,418	37.31%	270	1.07%
1952	20,726	63.83%	11,611	35.76%	135	0.42%
1956	22,556	68.35%	10,406	31.53%	41	0.12%
1960	25,525	68.33%	11,761	31.49%	67	0.18%
1964	17,891	52.86%	15,882	46.93%	72	0.21%
1968	21,832	64.16%	9,529	28.01%	2,664	7.83%
1972	25,008	77.38%	6,683	20.68%	629	1.95%
1976	20,880	62.65%	11,785	35.36%	665	2.00%
1980	24,495	68.99%	8,281	23.32%	2,731	7.69%
1984	27,008	71.61%	10,520	27.89%	188	0.50%
1988	24,415	66.69%	11,912	32.54%	281	0.77%
1992	21,512	50.00%	12,350	28.71%	9,159	21.29%
1996	21,885	53.73%	14,187	34.83%	4,663	11.45%
2000	28,534	62.17%	16,093	35.06%	1,270	2.77%
2004	37,089	66.63%	18,109	32.53%	467	0.84%
2008	34,314	58.59%	23,310	39.80%	939	1.60%
2012	35,872	63.18%	19,900	35.05%	1,005	1.77%
2016	40,525	64.84%	18,953	30.32%	3,025	4.84%
2020	46,731	65.03%	23,932	33.30%	1,195	1.66%
2024	48,282	65.26%	24,734	33.43%	970	1.31%

Pennsylvania Gubernatorial election results for Lebanon County
Year	Republican		Democratic		Third party(ies)	
Year	No.	%	No.	%	No.	%
1970	13,515	51.10%	11,520	43.56%	1,413	5.34%
1974	13,233	53.51%	11,198	45.28%	301	1.22%
1978	16,652	64.17%	9,066	34.94%	232	0.89%
1982	16,107	55.89%	12,442	43.17%	269	0.93%
1986	15,815	56.11%	12,154	43.12%	218	0.77%
1990	8,055	30.02%	18,776	69.98%	0	0.00%
1994	16,780	51.53%	9,320	28.62%	6,462	19.85%
1998	20,263	72.69%	4,775	17.13%	2,836	10.17%
2002	22,659	62.69%	12,712	35.17%	775	2.14%
2006	22,775	57.53%	16,813	42.47%	0	0.00%
2010	29,534	74.07%	10,340	25.93%	0	0.00%
2014	22,738	62.52%	13,629	37.48%	0	0.00%
2018	28,096	57.21%	20,159	41.05%	853	1.74%
2022	31,731	56.19%	23,646	41.88%	1,089	1.93%

=== Voter registration ===
According to the Secretary of State's office, Republicans comprise a majority of registered voters in Lebanon County.

Lebanon County voter registration statistics as of January 2, 2024
Political party	Total voters	Percentage
Republican	50,528	55.42%
Democratic	26,238	28.78%
No party affiliation	10,420	11.43%
Minor parties	3,978	4.36%
Total	91,164	100.00%

=== United States Senate ===
United States Senate election results for Lebanon County, Pennsylvania1
Year	Republican		Democratic		Third party(ies)	
Year	No.	%	No.	%	No.	%
1994	19,247	61.79%	9,918	31.84%	1,983	6.37%
2000	28,324	64.40%	14,517	33.01%	1,142	2.60%
2006	21,756	55.09%	17,737	44.91%	0	0.00%
2012	33,843	60.48%	21,007	37.54%	1,110	1.98%
2018	29,836	60.71%	18,368	37.37%	945	1.92%
2024	46,172	63.13%	24,745	33.83%	2,222	3.04%

United States Senate election results for Lebanon County, Pennsylvania3
Year	Republican		Democratic		Third party(ies)	
Year	No.	%	No.	%	No.	%
1992	24,527	59.00%	14,708	35.38%	2,337	5.62%
1998	19,539	73.36%	6,089	22.86%	1,007	3.78%
2004	35,182	66.89%	13,096	24.90%	4,322	8.22%
2010	27,881	70.20%	11,838	29.80%	0	0.00%
2016	39,386	64.02%	19,079	31.01%	3,060	4.97%
2022	35,023	62.00%	19,695	34.86%	1,773	3.14%

=== United States House of Representatives ===
The county is located in the 9th congressional district, represented by Dan Meuser, Republican.

=== State senate ===
All of the county falls within the 48th Senatorial District. The seat is currently held by Lebanon business owner and Republican Chris Gebhard.

=== State House of Representatives ===
The county is divided into the 98th, 101st, and 102nd Pennsylvania House Districts.

==== 98th District ====
The 98th District, which includes Mt. Gretna Borough, South Annville Township, and South Londonderry Township is represented by Republican Tom Jones.

==== 101st District ====
The 101st District, served by Republican John Schlegel, includes:

- Cornwall Borough
- Lebanon City
- North Cornwall Twp.
- North Lebanon Twp.
- South Lebanon Twp.
- West Cornwall Twp.
- West Lebanon Twp.

==== 102nd District ====
The 102nd District, served by Republican Russ Diamond, includes:

- Annville Twp.
- Bethel Twp.
- Cleona Borough
- Cold Spring Twp.
- East Hanover Twp.
- Heidelberg Twp.
- Jackson Twp.
- Jonestown Borough
- Millcreek Twp.
- Myerstown Borough
- North Annville Twp.
- Richland Borough
- North Londonderry Twp.
- Palmyra Borough
- Richland Borough
- Swatara Twp.
- Union Twp.

=== County government ===
The county is governed by three commissioners, who are elected every four years from a slate of four candidates (two Democrats and two Republicans). Other elected officials include County Controller, Sheriff, Coroner, Prothonotary and Clerk of Court, Recorder of Deeds, County Treasurer, and Register of Wills and Clerk of Orphans' Court.

=== Electoral history ===
For most of its history, Lebanon County has been one of the most Republican counties in Pennsylvania. The county is strongly Republican even by the standards of south-central Pennsylvania. It is very conservative for an urban county, having supported a Democrat for president only once since 1880. That came when Franklin D. Roosevelt won the county in his 46-state landslide reelection; even then, FDR carried it by only 587 votes. The only other time since 1880 that the county has failed to support a Republican was in 1912, when the GOP was mortally divided and Theodore Roosevelt carried it on the Bull Moose ticket.

In 1964, Lebanon County was one of only four counties in the state to vote for Barry Goldwater, along with Snyder, Union, and Wayne counties.

In the 2006 election for U.S. Senate, the county cast 21,756 votes (55.1%) for Republican Rick Santorum and 17,737 (44.9%) for Democrat Bob Casey, Jr., who won the race. In that year's gubernatorial election, the county cast 22,775 votes (57.5%) for Republican Lynn Swann and 16,813 (42.5%) for Democrat Ed Rendell, who won the race.

In the 2004 presidential election, the county cast 37,089 votes (66.6%) for Republican George W. Bush and 18,109 (32.5%) for Democrat John Kerry. In that same year's election for U.S. Senate, the county cast 35,336 votes (66.8%) for Republican Arlen Specter, 13,182 for Democrat Joe Hoeffel, 3,320 (6.3%) for Constitution Party candidate Jim Clymer, and 1,083 (2.0%) for Libertarian Betsy Summers. In the 2008 presidential election the county cast 34,314 votes (58.59%) for Republican John McCain and 23,310 votes (39.8%) for Barack Obama. In the 2016 presidential election, the county cast 38,804 votes (65,9%) for Republican Donald Trump and 17,860 votes (30,3%) for Democrat Hillary Clinton.

In the 2002 gubernatorial election, the county cast 22,659 votes (62.7%) for Republican Mike Fisher and 12,712 (35.2%) for Democrat Ed Rendell, who won the race. In the 2002 race for the U.S. House of Representatives, Republican George Gekas received 21,733 votes (60.9%) from the county while Democrat Tim Holden received 13,945 (39.1%); Holden won.

== Education ==
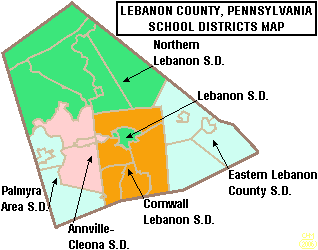
Map of Lebanon County school districts

=== Colleges and universities ===
- Harrisburg Area Community College (Lebanon Campus)
- Lebanon Valley College
- Evangelical Seminary

=== Public school districts ===
- Annville-Cleona School District
- Cornwall-Lebanon School District
- Eastern Lebanon County School District
- Lebanon School District
- Northern Lebanon School District
- Palmyra Area School District

== Communities ==
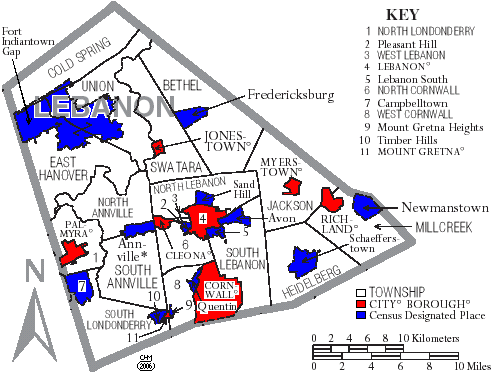
Map of Lebanon County with municipal labels showing cities and boroughs (red), townships (white), and census-designated places (blue)

Under Pennsylvania law, there are four types of incorporated municipalities: cities, boroughs, townships, and, in at most two cases, towns. The following cities, boroughs and townships are located in Lebanon County:

=== City ===
- Lebanon (county seat)

=== Boroughs ===
- Cleona
- Cornwall
- Jonestown
- Mount Gretna
- Myerstown
- Palmyra
- Richland

=== Townships ===
- Annville
- Bethel
- Cold Spring
- East Hanover
- Heidelberg
- Jackson
- Millcreek
- North Annville
- North Cornwall
- North Lebanon
- North Londonderry
- South Annville
- South Lebanon
- South Londonderry
- Swatara
- Union
- West Cornwall
- West Lebanon

=== Census-designated places ===
Census-designated places are geographical areas designated by the U.S. Census Bureau for the purposes of compiling demographic data. They are not actual jurisdictions under Pennsylvania law.

- Annville
- Avon
- Campbelltown
- Fort Indiantown Gap
- Fredericksburg
- Hebron
- Lebanon South
- Mount Gretna Heights
- Newmanstown
- Pleasant Hill
- Quentin
- Sand Hill
- Schaefferstown
- Timber Hills

=== Other unincorporated communities ===
- Anthracite
- Bellegrove
- Beverly Heights
- Bordnersville
- Buffalo Springs
- Bunker Hill
- Canaan Grove
- Clear Spring
- Coffeetown
- Colebrook
- Coheva
- Dogtown
- East Hanover
- Ebenezer
- Edisonville
- Eustontown
- Flintville
- Fontana
- Freeport Mills
- Gold Mine
- Gravel Hill
- Greble
- Green Point
- Hamlin
- Harper Tavern
- Hauckville
- Heilmandale
- Indiantown
- Inwood
- Iona
- Johnstown
- Kleinfeltersville
- Kutztown
- Lawn
- Lickdale
- McGillstown
- Midway
- Millardsville
- Millbach
- Millbach Springs
- Mount Ararat
- Mount Pleasant
- Mount Wilson
- Mount Zion
- Murray
- Nacetown
- Ono
- Pansy Hill
- Plainville
- Prescott
- Reinoeldville
- Reistville
- Rocherty
- Rockwood
- Sheridan
- Shirksville
- Springhaven
- Stricklerstown
- Syner
- Union Water Works
- Upper Lawn
- Valley Glenn
- Waldeck
- Weavertown, Jackson Township
- Weavertown, North Lebanon Township
- West Jonestown
- Westmont
- Woodfort
- Zinns Mill

=== Ghost towns ===
- Cold Spring
- Rausch Gap

=== Population ranking ===
The population ranking of the following table is based on the 2010 census of Lebanon County.

† county seat

Rank	City/town/etc.	Municipal type	Population (2010 Census)
1	† Lebanon	City	25,477
2	Palmyra	Borough	7,320
3	Annville (township)	CDP	4,767
4	Cornwall	Borough	4,112
5	Campbelltown	CDP	3,616
6	Myerstown	Borough	3,062
7	Pleasant Hill	CDP	2,643
8	Sand Hill	CDP	2,496
9	Newmanstown	CDP	2,478
10	Lebanon South	CDP	2,270
11	Cleona	Borough	2,080
12	Jonestown	Borough	1,905
13	Avon	CDP	1,667
14	Richland	Borough	1,519
15	Fredericksburg	CDP	1,357
16	Hebron	CDP	1,305
17	Schaefferstown	CDP	941
18	Quentin	CDP	594
19	Timber Hills	CDP	360
20	Mount Gretna Heights	CDP	323
21	Mount Gretna	Borough	196
22	Fort Indiantown Gap	CDP	143

== Parks and recreational places ==
- Memorial Lake State Park
- Swatara State Park
- Union Canal Tunnel Park
- Lions Lake Park
- Coleman's Memorial Park
- Stoever's Dam Park
- South Hill's Park
- Mount Gretna Lake
- Middle Creek Wildlife Management Area
- Lebanon Valley Rails to Trails
- Bordner Cabin

== See also ==
- National Register of Historic Places listings in Lebanon County, Pennsylvania
