= Pennsylvania Route 117 =

State highway in Lebanon County, Pennsylvania, US

Pennsylvania Route 117

Route information
- Maintained by PennDOT
- Length: 12.576 mi (20.239 km)

Major junctions
- South end: US 322 / PA 72 in Cornwall
- PA 241 in Colebrook; US 322 near Campbelltown
- North end: US 422 in Palmyra

Location
- Country: United States
- State: Pennsylvania
- Counties: Lebanon

Highway system
- Pennsylvania State Route System; Interstate; US; State; Scenic; Legislative
← PA 116	→ PA 118
← PA 819	PA 820	→ PA 821
← PA 852	PA 853	→ PA 854

Pennsylvania Route 117 (PA 117) is a 12.6-mile-long (20.3 km) state route in Lebanon County, Pennsylvania. Its southern terminus is at an interchange with U.S. Route 322 (US 322)/PA 72 in Cornwall. Its northern terminus is at US 422 in Palmyra. PA 117 heads west from US 322/PA 72 through forested areas, passing through Mount Gretna before forming a short concurrency with PA 241 in Colebrook. From here, the route heads northwest and intersects US 322 near Campbelltown.

PA 117 continues north through agricultural areas to Palmyra, where it reaches its northern terminus. The route is a two-lane undivided road its entire length. PA 117 was originally designated in 1928 between PA 5 (now US 322) in Campbelltown and US 22 (now US 422) in Palmyra along Palmyra Road and South Railroad Street. PA 820 was designated between PA 241 in Colebrook and PA 5 near Campbelltown while PA 853 was designated between Mount Gretna and PA 72 west of Cornwall. PA 117 was moved to its current alignment by 1946, replacing all of PA 820 and PA 853.

== Route description ==
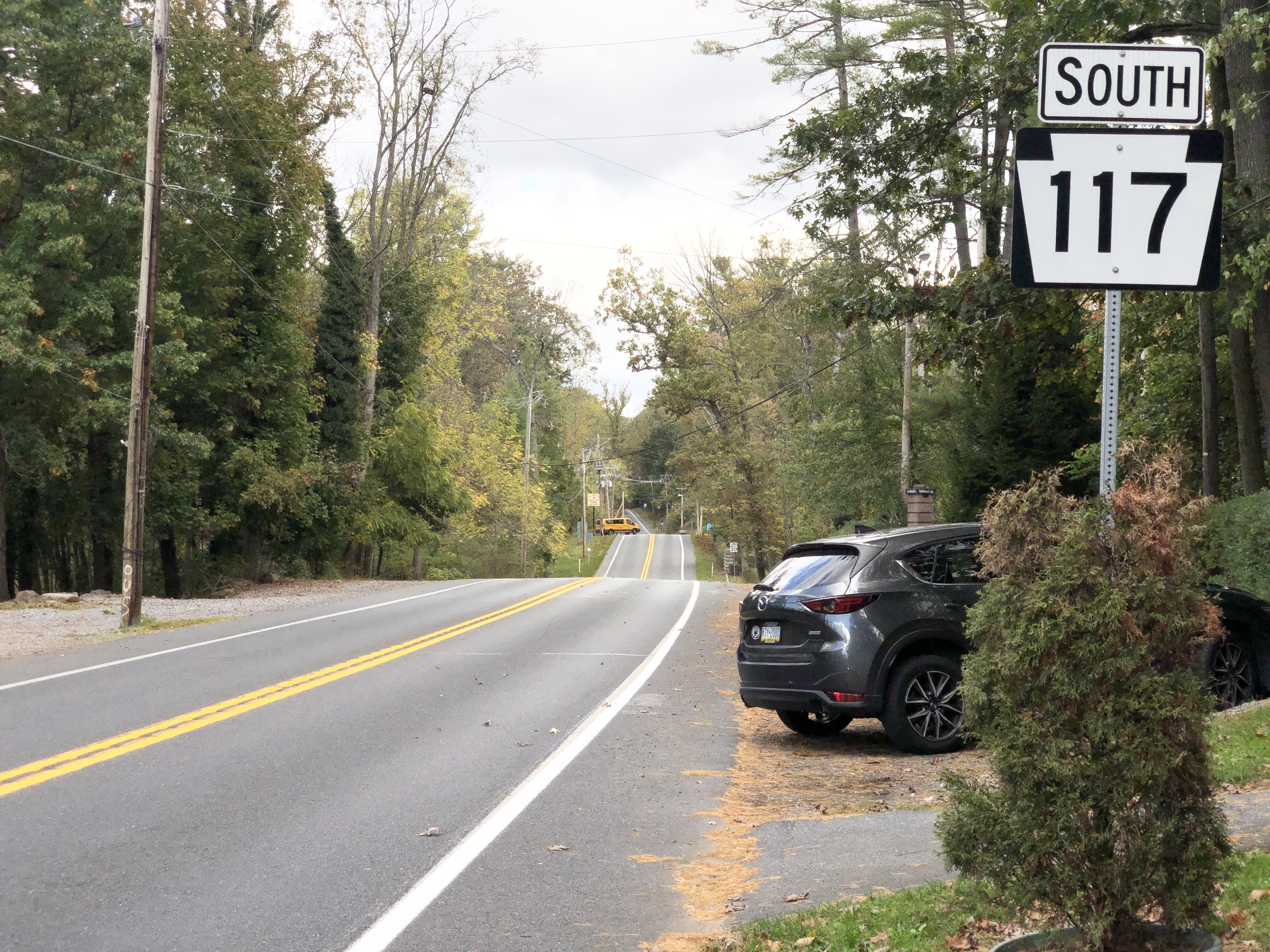
PA 117 southbound in West Cornwall Township

PA 117 begins at a partial cloverleaf interchange with the US 322/PA 72 freeway in the borough of Cornwall in Lebanon County, heading west as a two-lane undivided road. East of this interchange, Ironmaster Road continues into Cornwall. From this point, the route heads west into West Cornwall Township and runs southwest through forested areas in the South Mountain range parallel to the Conewago Creek and Lebanon Valley Rail Trail, which run to the north of the road. The road curves west and southwest again, passing to the north of the community of Mount Gretna Heights. PA 117 runs near the northwestern border of the borough of Mount Gretna as it passes between wooded residential areas to the southeast and Conewago Lake to the northwest, with the name becoming Mt. Gretna Road. The road enters South Londonderry Township and winds west through more forests, running parallel to the Conewago Creek and eventually the Lebanon Valley Rail Trail. In the community of Colebrook, the route turns north onto Mt. Wilson Road, crossing the rail trail, and passes homes before it comes to an intersection with PA 241. At this point, PA 241 turns north for a concurrency with PA 117, and the two routes head northwest across the creek and through farm fields.

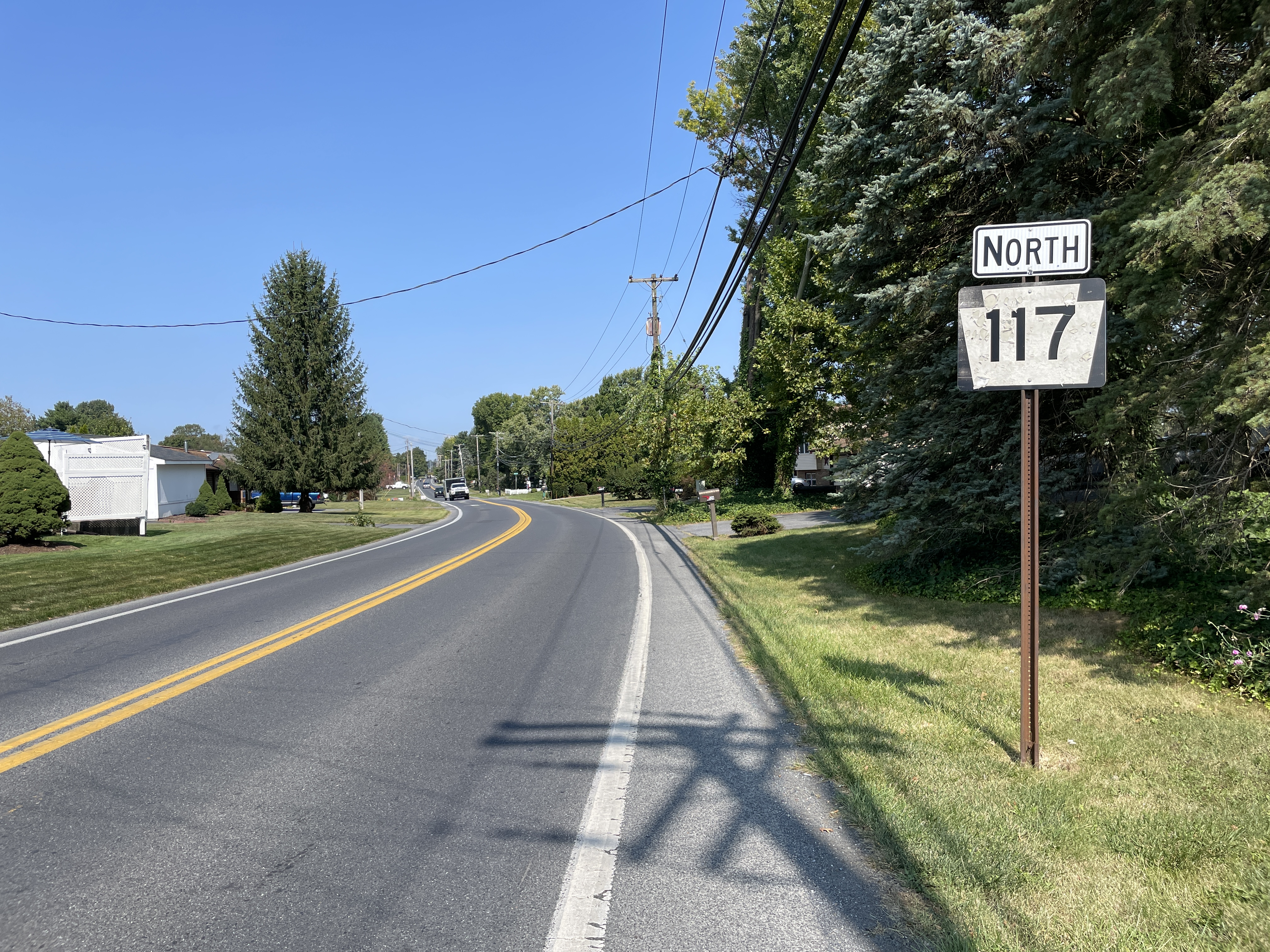
PA 117 northbound in North Londonderry Township

PA 117 splits from PA 241 by heading west on South Forge Road, passing through a mix of farmland and woodland with some homes. The road curves northwest and runs through forested areas with some fields, passing to the southwest of a wooded residential neighborhood. The route passes through a corner of South Annville Township before it continues back into South Londonderry Township and passes through farmland with some trees and homes. PA 117 turns north into the Lebanon Valley and passes near residential subdivisions and some farms before it comes to a junction with US 322 to the east of the community of Campbelltown. Past this intersection, the route heads through agricultural areas with some residential development to the west of the road, intersecting Northside Drive at a roundabout. The road passes to the east of the Reigle Field airport and continues through farmland with some development as it enters North Londondery Township. PA 117 heads into residential areas and turns to the north-northwest, crossing into the borough of Palmyra. The route passes more homes before it reaches its northern terminus at US 422 in a commercial area. Past this intersection, the road continues north as unnumbered North Forge Road.

== History ==
Pennsylvania Route 820
- Location: Colebrook – Campbelltown
- Existed: 1930–1946

Pennsylvania Route 853
- Location: Mount Gretna – Cornwall
- Existed: 1928–1946

When Pennsylvania first legislated routes in 1911, present-day PA 117 was not given a route number. PA 117 was designated in 1928 to run from PA 5 (now US 322) in Campbelltown north to US 22 (now US 422) in Palmyra, following Palmyra Road and South Railroad Street while PA 853 was designated to run from Mount Gretna east to PA 72 west of Cornwall. By 1930, PA 820 was designated to run from PA 241 north of Colebrook northwest to PA 5 east of Campbelltown. At this time, all three routes were paved. By 1946, PA 117 was realigned to its current alignment between PA 72 on the western border of Cornwall and US 422 in Palmyra, replacing the PA 820 and PA 853 designations in their entirety. In 1963, the southern terminus at US 322/PA 72 was converted to an interchange as part of upgrading US 322/PA 72 to a freeway. On July 26, 2011, a roundabout opened at Northside Drive in South Londonderry Township; this was the first roundabout in Lebanon County.

== Major intersections ==
The entire route is in Lebanon County.

Location	mi	km	Destinations	Notes
West Cornwall Township	0.000	0.000	US 322 / PA 72	Interchange; southern terminus
South Londonderry Township	5.517	8.879	PA 241 south (Elizabethtown Road) – Lawn, Elizabethtown	South end of PA 241 concurrency
South Londonderry Township	6.009	9.671	PA 241 north (Mount Wilson Road) – Lebanon	North end of PA 241 concurrency
South Londonderry Township	10.090	16.238	US 322 (Horseshoe Pike) – Hershey, Cornwall	
Palmyra	12.576	20.239	US 422 (East Main Street) – Hershey, Lebanon	Northern terminus
1.000 mi = 1.609 km; 1.000 km = 0.621 mi: Concurrency terminus
