= Palmyra Area High School =

Public high school in Pennsylvania, United States

Coordinates: 40.2980°N 76.5839°W

- 1125 Park Drive; Palmyra, Lebanon County, Pennsylvania, 17078; United States

Information
- Type: Public Secondary
- Motto: "Excellence in Education, for all Students"
- Established: 1963
- School district: Palmyra Area School District
- Principal: Scott Richardson
- Faculty: 70.12 (FTE)
- Grades: 9 to 12
- Enrollment: 1,181 (2022–2023)
- Student to teacher ratio: 16.84
- Color: Black Orange White
- Team name: Cougars
- Website: www.pasd.us/High-School

Palmyra Area Senior High School (typically referred to as Palmyra High School or PHS) is a midsized public high school located in Palmyra, Pennsylvania, in the United States. It is part of the Palmyra Area School District. The school is located at 1125 Park Drive in North Londonderry Township and serves students from the western part of Lebanon County, Pennsylvania and includes: Palmyra, North Londonderry Township, South Londonderry Township, the villages of Campbelltown, Lawn, Colebrook, and Mount Gretna. The school was founded in 1962.

In the 2018–2019 school year, Palmyra Area Senior High School had 1,141 students grades 9th through 12th.

== Renovations ==
The Palmyra Area High School underwent a $35 million renovation to the existing school, as well as additions in 2007. Due to a population increase in the Palmyra area, school officials decided that the aging building could no longer support the projected increase in students. The School Board decided a renovation with additions was more sensible than building a new school.

The first phase was the construction of a new 15 classroom, 2 story addition to the existing school. This was completed in December 2006, and held student occupation on January 2, 2007. Also, the new cafeteria was completed for January 23, 2007. Additions included; a new two story, 15-classroom wing, new weight training center, new art rooms, a new cafeteria and new communication and production technology classrooms.

Despite the large amount of progress with the project, work was stopped suddenly both on renovations and in the classrooms. On Monday April 9, 2007 at about 8:50AM, a fire broke out on a Tar Roofing Machine on the north end of the campus, by the new wing. An immediate evacuation of nearby classrooms into the gymnasium was conducted for a short time, and nearby propane tanks which fueled the device were removed. Local fire services arrived shortly thereafter and extinguished the fire. Exhaust and smoke then moved into the school building and covered windows and vehicles. The event caused a minor delay in the school schedule.

Phase III was completed at the end of summer 2007. It included the renovations of the Business Department Wing, which went under renovation on April 17, 2007. Also, the new Library opened, in the area of the old Kitchen and Production Technology Room. Additional miscellaneous classrooms opened in the old cafeteria location.

== Extracurriculars ==
=== Athletics ===
Palmyra competes in District III of the Pennsylvania Interscholastic Athletic Association (PIAA). Palmyra fields teams in the following Mid Penn Keystone Division of the Mid Penn Conference

Boys

- Baseball – AAAAA (2013 District III playoff qualifier)
- Basketball- AAAAA (2013 District III runner-up)
- Cross Country – AAA
- Football – AAAAA (2015 District III playoff qualifier)
- Golf – AAA
- Lacrosse – AA
- Soccer – AAA (2007 AA State Champions)
- Swimming and Diving – AAA (3rd place 2013 District III Championships, 6 state qualifiers)
- Tennis – AAA (PIAA Doubles Champions- 2022, 2023)
- Track and Field – AAA
- Volleyball – AAA
- Wrestling – AAA

Girls

- Basketball – AAAAA (2014 District III Runner-Up)
- Cross Country – AAA (2013 PIAA Class AA Champions)
- Field Hockey – AA (2015 District III Champions, 2015 PIAA AAA Runner Up)
- Golf – AAA
- Lacrosse – AAA
- Soccer (Fall) – AAAA
- Softball – AAAAA
- Swimming and Diving – AAA (4th place 2013 District III Championships, 8 state qualifiers)
- Girls' Tennis – AAA
- Track and Field – AAA
- Volleyball – AAAA
