= Campbelltown, Pennsylvania =

Unincorporated community in Pennsylvania, US

- Census-designated place
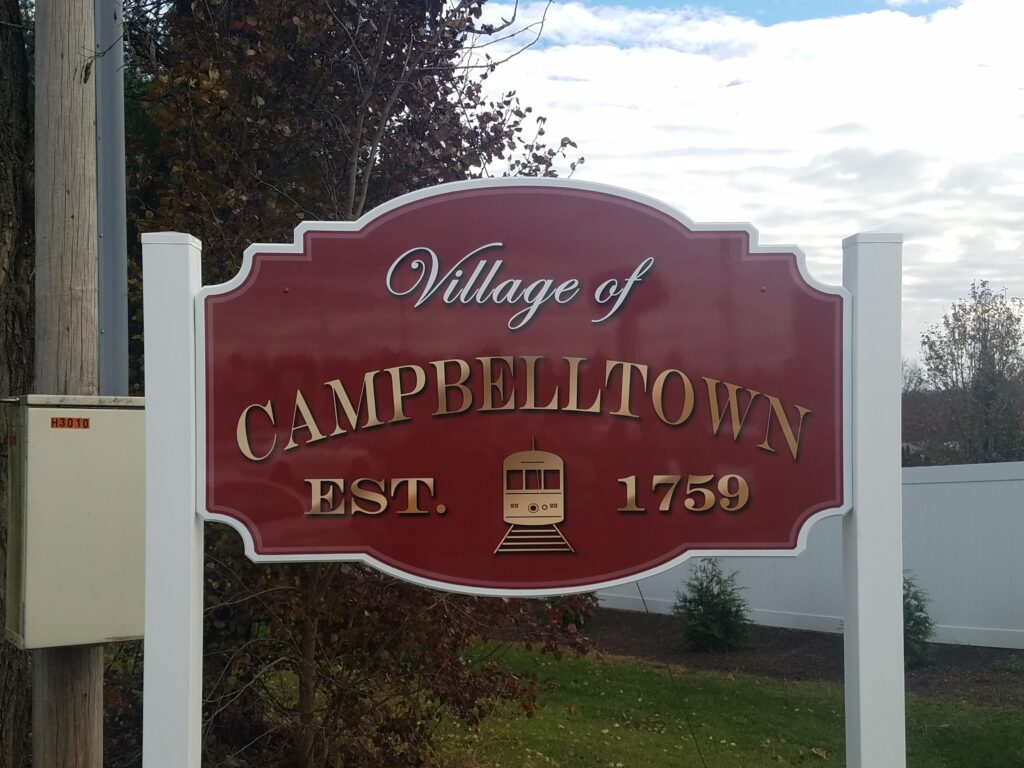
- Village Sign

- Location in Pennsylvania Location in the United States
- Coordinates: 40°16′39″N 76°35′7″W
- Country: United States
- State: Pennsylvania
- County: Lebanon
- Township: South Londonderry

Area
  - Total: 3.22 sq mi (8.33 km^{2})
  - Land: 3.22 sq mi (8.33 km^{2})
  - Water: 0 sq mi (0.00 km^{2})
- Elevation: 450 ft (140 m)

Population (2020)
  - Total: 5,922
  - Density: 1,840.3/sq mi (710.54/km^{2})
- Time zone: UTC-5 (Eastern (EST))
  - Summer (DST): UTC-4 (EDT)
- ZIP code: 17010
- Area code: 717
- FIPS code: 42-10960
- GNIS feature ID: 1171142

Campbelltown is an unincorporated community and census-designated place (CDP) in Lebanon County, Pennsylvania, United States. The population was 3,616 at the 2010 census. It is located east of Hershey at the intersection of U.S. Route 322 and Pennsylvania Route 117 and is located in the Harrisburg metropolitan area.

== Geography ==
Campbelltown is located in southwestern Lebanon County at 40°16′42″N 76°35′3″W (40.278200, -76.584149), in the northern part of South Londonderry Township. It is bordered to the west by Hershey in Dauphin County.

U.S. Route 322 passes through the center of Campbelltown, leading west through the southern part of Hershey 18 miles (29 km) to Harrisburg, the state capital. To the east US-322 leads 24 miles (39 km) to Ephrata in Lancaster County. PA-117 crosses US-322 on the eastern edge of Campbelltown; it leads north 2 miles (3 km) to Palmyra and southeast 7 miles (11 km) to Mount Gretna.

According to the United States Census Bureau, the Campbelltown CDP has a total area of 2.9 square miles (7.6 km^{2}), all land. Spring Creek rises in the community and flows northwest to Swatara Creek, a tributary of the Susquehanna River.

== History ==
The first European settlers to the Lebanon Valley area were namely Scotch-Irish and German Palatinate immigrants who left their homelands due to a number of political, economic and religious reasons. The Scotch-Irish in particular were also politically minded, and became involved in local governments quickly after settling in the area.

In 1751, a Scotch-Irish immigrant by the name of John Campbell came to Pennsylvania and settled in the area then known as Derry Township in Lancaster County. Campbell, who was a farmer, initially obtained a 100 acre warrant from Thomas and Richard Penn, proprietors of the Province of Pennsylvania in 1752 and sons of the famous William Penn. After returning his survey, which grew to 352 acres, he patented the property on August 6, 1759. Campbell then laid out various lots subject to the ground rent system, and the village of Campbelltown, then named "Campbell's Town" was thus established.

After John Campbell's death between 1775 and 1776, the land transferred to his brother Patrick who was from Cumberland County. Peter Grubb, Iron master of the Cornwall Furnace, purchased the same tract and ground rents in 1779, which was later sold to Robert Coleman along with many of Grubb's other properties. Eventually, Philip Wolfersberger purchased the same 352 acres from Coleman in 1785, and in 1809, the Campbelltown tract was split into four parcels amongst his sons Peter, John, Frederick and Philip.

A branch of the U. S. Post Office was established in the village in about 1811 with Wolfersberger serving as the first postmaster.

Campbelltown's government has always lied with the township. Originally part of Derry Township, Lancaster County, it became part of Londonderry Township, Lancaster County in 1768, and then Londonderry Township, Dauphin County in 1785. After the formation of Lebanon County in 1813, the village became part of Londonderry Township.

In 1894, Londonderry Township was divided into North and South, and Campbelltown became part of South Londonderry Township along with Colebrook and Lawn.

=== Education ===
Education in early Campbelltown was handled by the churches of the area until the enactment of the Free School Act in 1834 when public schools began to be established. Under the direction of the Londonderry Township School Board, the location closed during the 1972-73 school year. Since the merger of the Palmyra Area Joint School District (Palmyra Borough and North Londonderry Township) and the South Londonderry Township School District in 1962, education has been served by the Palmyra Area School District.

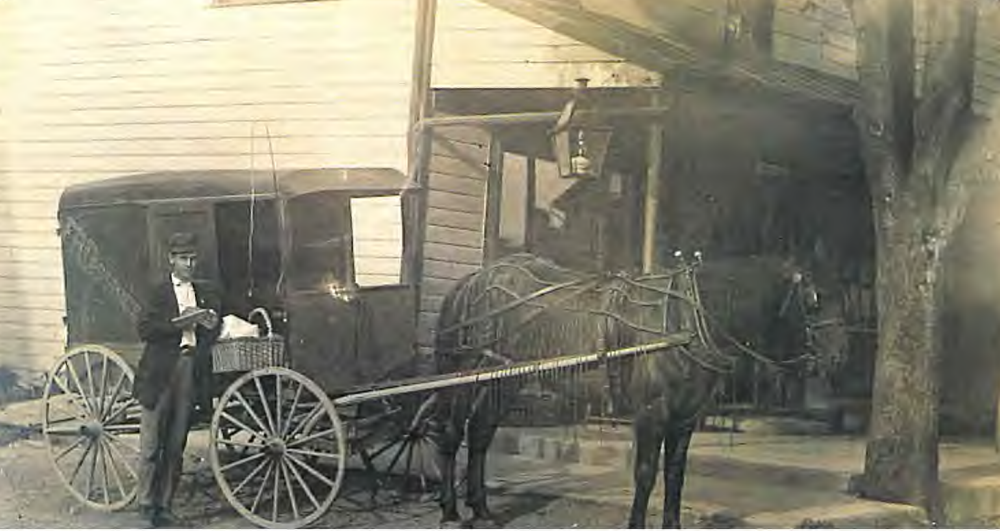
Frank R. Dissinger's store delivery wagon, 1908

=== Transportation ===
Early Campbelltown served as a stop on the main trolley en route connecting Philadelphia and Harrisburg. The Downingtown, Ephrata and Harrisburg Pike, which was commonly known as the Horseshoe Pike, was chartered in 1803 and completed 1819, which later became part of US 322. Many people found themselves traveling through the village and staying at its few hotels.

Thanks to Milton S. Hershey, the arrival of public transportation in the form of a street railway in 1908 provided the citizens with the chance to travel beyond the boundaries of the village, including to the cities of Harrisburg, Lebanon, and beyond.

== Demographics ==
Historical population
Census	Pop.	Note	%±
2020	5,922		—
U.S. Decennial Census

As of the census of 2000, there were 2,415 people, 900 households, and 682 families residing in the CDP. The population density was 836.2 inhabitants per square mile (322.9/km^{2}). There were 939 housing units at an average density of 325.1 per square mile (125.5/km^{2}). The racial makeup of the CDP was 97.1% White, 0.8% African American, 1.0% Asian, 0.3% from other races, and 0.9% from two or more races. Hispanic or Latino of any race were 0.8% of the population.

There were 900 households, out of which 38.3% had children under the age of 18 living with them, 64.4% were married couples living together, 8.6% had a female householder with no husband present, and 24.2% were non-families. 21.2% of all households were made up of individuals, and 7.7% had someone living alone who was 65 years of age or older. The average household size was 2.61 and the average family size was 3.05.

In the CDP, the population was spread out, with 27.0% under the age of 18, 5.1% from 18 to 24, 33.0% from 25 to 44, 22.3% from 45 to 64, and 12.6% who were 65 years of age or older. The median age was 37 years. For every 100 females, there were 92.6 males. For every 100 females age 18 and over, there were 86.3 males.

The median income for a household in the CDP was $55,625, and the median income for a family was $66,452. Males had a median income of $45,306 versus $29,659 for females. The per capita income for the CDP was $22,827. None of the families and 0.9% of the population were living below the poverty line, including no under eighteens and none of those over 64.

== Campbelltown tornadoes ==
On July 14, 2004, around 3 pm, a tornado warning was issued by the National Weather Service for Lebanon County. A few moments later, an F3 tornado with winds over 160 miles per hour (260 km/h) struck the extreme southeast part of the village. No deaths occurred, but several minor to moderate injuries were treated. It is the largest and most expensive tornado to have struck Lebanon County.

On June 22, 2010, an EF0 tornado touched down in Campbelltown. This weak tornado did not cause as much damage as the one in 2004.

== Village Square Project ==
On October 23, 2023, Ethos Residential made public their plans to create a proposed village square project in the village of Campbelltown. Three properties along U.S. 322, formerly known as the Alger Farm, are envisioned for the new 15.15-acre mixed-use development.

The proposed architecture is loosely based on that used throughout historic Campbelltown and will be designed to function as a traditional town square.

== HMS Campbeltown ==
HMS Campbeltown (I42) was a World War II Royal Navy destroyer used in the St Nazaire Raid whose bell was donated to the municipality after the war.

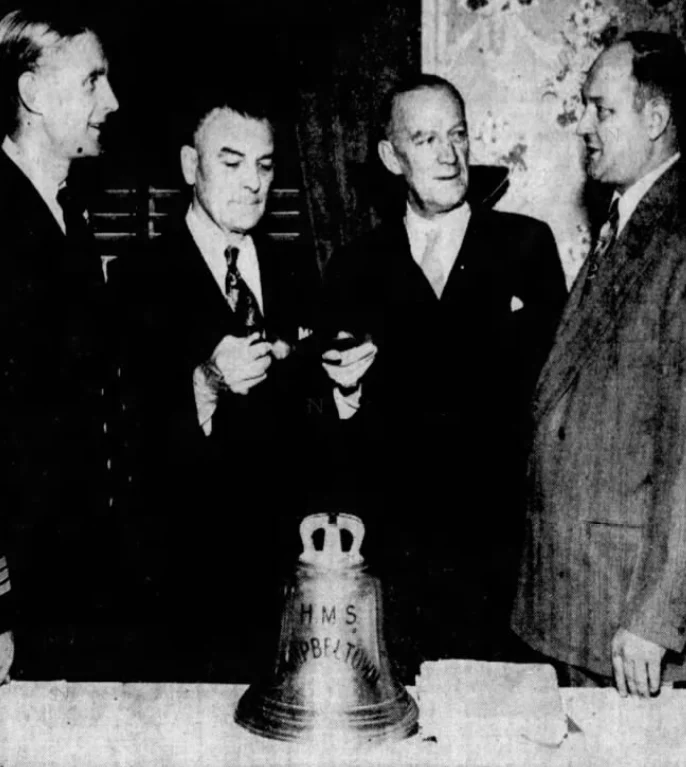
British Commander Robert Boddy, Campbelltown representative Abner Spangler, British consul-general H. C. McClelland, and Lebanon Mayor William Focht at the bell’s gifting ceremony in 1950.

In 1940, the Lend-Lease agreement between the United States and the United Kingdom was signed that gave 50 of the United States Navy destroyer in exchange for leases on British bases in the Western Hemisphere. One of these ships, USS Buchanan, launched in 1919, became HMS Campbeltown. Its namesake was Campbeltown of Argyll County, Scotland, and its American counterpart, was Campbelltown of Lebanon County, Pennsylvania.

After the war, the bell resided in the Scottish Campbeltown until 1950, when British consul-general H. C. McClelland wrote a letter to the mayor of Lebanon announcing that the ship's bell was being bequeathed to the city in recognition of a special bond between the town and the United Kingdom. The bell sits in the South Londonderry Township municipal building as a symbol of Campbelltown. In 1988 the people of Campbelltown voted to lend the bell to the new ship HMS Campbeltown (F86) for as long as she remained in Royal Navy service. The bell was returned to the town on June 21, 2011 when HMS Campbeltown was decommissioned. A new Type 31 HMS Campbeltown was announced as part of the new Inspiration class of frigates for the Royal Navy on May 19, 2021.
