= Londonderry Township, Pennsylvania =

Londonderry Township is the name of some places in the U.S. state of Pennsylvania:

- Londonderry Township, Bedford County, Pennsylvania
- Londonderry Township, Chester County, Pennsylvania
- Londonderry Township, Dauphin County, Pennsylvania

== See also ==
- North Londonderry Township, Pennsylvania
- South Londonderry Township, Pennsylvania
