= John Campbell (patentee) =

John Campbell (abt. 1720–1776) is credited for founding Campbelltown, Pennsylvania. He was part of the wave of Scotch-Irish immigrants who voyaged to the New World in the 1700s. These immigrants, mostly of Scottish origin, were lured to the New World by a promise of cheap land and a fresh start.

== Personal life and family ==
John Campbell was born in Ireland to James Campbell Sr. sometime around 1720. John's great-great grandfather, Duncan Campbell, was born in Inverary, Argyllshire, Scotland and moved to Londonderry County in 1612 where he later had three grandchildren named Dugald, John and Robert. John's branch of the family emigrated from Ireland in 1726 along with his son James and two grandsons John and Patrick to Philadelphia, Pennsylvania, where settled in the area then known as Derry Township in Lancaster County, named so after his homeland. James owned a large plantation in modern-day Hershey, Pennsylvania and left it to his grandson James Campbell Jr. and would be divided if his son John were to ever have a surviving male child.

Duncan Campbell was "of the noble house of Breadalbane" and was the great-great grandson of Archibald Campbell, the 3rd Lord of Auchinbreck and Kilmichael and the great-grandson of Duncan Campbell, 1st Lord Campbell.

Campbell was of Scotch-Irish descent, a group of immigrants who were originally from Scotland and had settled in Ireland before moving to the New World by a promise of cheap land and a fresh start. Scotch-Irish immigrants began arriving in droves starting in 1718 after they had faced discrimination in Ireland along with skyrocketing rents. They were also politically minded, and became involved in local governments quickly after settling in the area.

=== Campbelltown ===
John Campbell seemed to be in the business of buying, selling, and renting properties, especially in his later years. Campbell, a farmer, was given one of the largest tracts of land (352 acres) in the area. He initially obtained a warrant for 100 acres from Thomas and Richard Penn, proprietors of the Province of Pennsylvania in 1752 and sons of the famous William Penn. After returning his survey, he purchased an additional 252 acres and patented it on August 6, 1759. Campbell had then laid out various lots subject to the ground rent system for his new town which he called "Campble's Town."

The town was subsequently sold to Peter Grubb for £7,000 in 1779, who presumably finished laying off the parcels, and renamed it to "Campbelltown."

== Later life and death ==
On 7 May 1761, Thomas Willing, a merchant of Philadelphia, executed a transaction with Campbell. The property, located on Swatara Creek, was conveyed to Campbell for the sum of £200. This deed was officially recorded on 5 November 1761.

John Campbell died intestate before April 3, 1776, at the outbreak of the American Revolutionary War. His wife, Margaret (surname unknown), sold her interest in the estate to John's brother, Patrick.

The said John Campbell did afterwards lay out part of the first above described Patented tract for a town or village and divided the said part into lots and granted and confirmed the same lots of ground unto sundry persons subject to the payment of a yearly ground rent… And whereas, the said John Campbell soon after died intestate and without issue.

== Legacy ==
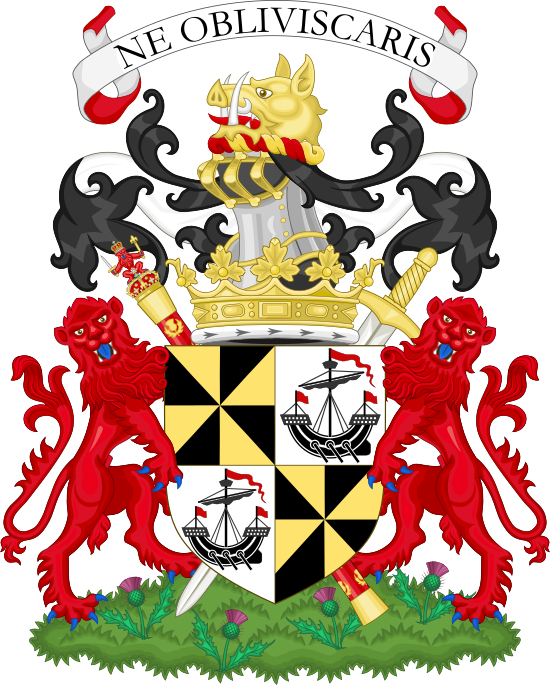
Coat of Arms of Clan Campbell

The names of the Townships of Derry and Londonderry are used interchangeably at a time when Londonderry was split from Derry in 1767. Today's Derry Township, Londonderry Township, North Londonderry Township, and South Londonderry Township all originated from the original Derry Township in Lancaster County. These areas were named after Londonderry County in Ireland, the homeland of John Campbell's family.

The 'coat of arms' for the Clan Campbell of Argyll, Scotland was used in the design of the shoulder patch of the South Londonderry Township Police Department, highlighting the area's connection to Campbell and his Scottish heritage.

The Latin words 'Ne Obliviscaris' scrolled above the helmet were original to the Campbell coat of arms. Its meaning is 'Forget not'. The helmet signifies protection and security in defense; The two lions in red depict strength and courage; The two objects in black and yellow are called Gyronnys. They stand for Unity (and are also the main objects in the Campbell families from both Ireland and Scotland).

== Family tree ==
Duncan Campbell (circa. 1590) | Mary Campbell (née McCoy)
John Campbell I (1621) | Grace Campbell (née Hay)
Dugald Campbell | John Campbell II (1656-1734) | Robert Campbell (1665)
Robert Campbell | David Campbell | James Campbell, Sr. (1689-1771) | Agnes Campbell (1707-1757) | Patrick Campbell (1690) | John Campbell (1692)
Rebecca Campbell | John Campbell (circa. 1720-1776) | Margaret Campbell | Patrick Campbell (circa. 1720-1794) | Eleanor Campbell (née Hays/Hayes) (circa. 1720-1795) | James Campbell (1731) | Francis Campbell (1737) | John Campbell (1740-1797)
James Campbell, Jr. (1756–1781) | Margaret McMichael (~1760–1825)
Eleanor Campbell (1780-1856)
