= Palmyra Area School District =

School district in Pennsylvania

Coordinates: 40.28528°N 76.58294°W

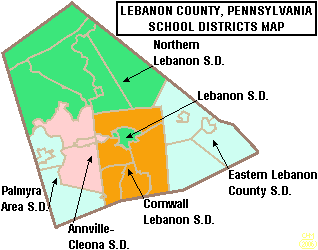

Address
- 1125 Park Drive Palmyra, Lebanon County, Pennsylvania, 17078-3447; United States

District information
- Type: Public

Other information
- Website: www.pasd.us

The Palmyra Area School District is the public school system in southwest Lebanon County, Pennsylvania.

The district serves the residents of Palmyra Borough, North Londonderry Township, South Londonderry Township, Campbelltown, Lawn, and Mount Gretna. This suburban district encompasses approximately 40 square miles (100 km^{2}). According to 2008 local census data, it serves a resident population of 20,487. By 2010, the District's population increased to 22,399 people. In 2009, the Palmyra Area School District residents’ per capita income was $24,082, while the median family income was $58,016. In the Commonwealth, the median family income was $49,501 and the United States median family income was $49,445, in 2010.

Palmyra Area School District consists of:

- Palmyra Area High School
- Palmyra Area Middle School
- Forge Road Elementary School
- Pine Street Elementary School
- Northside Elementary School
- Lingle Avenue Elementary School

== Extracurriculars ==
The schools offer a variety of clubs, activities and an extensive sports program.

=== Sports ===
The District funds:

Boys

- Baseball - AAA
- Basketball- AAA
- Cross Country - AAA
- Football - AAAAA
- Golf - AAA
- Lacrosse - AAAA
- Soccer - AAA
- Swimming and Diving - AA
- Tennis - AA
- Track and Field - AAA
- Wrestling - AAA

Girls

- Basketball - AAA
- Cross Country - AAA
- Field Hockey - AA
- Golf - AAA
- Lacrosse - AAAA
- Soccer (Fall) - AAA
- Softball - AAA
- Swimming and Diving - AA
- Girls' Tennis - AAA
- Track and Field - AAA
- Volleyball AAA

Junior high school sports

Boys

- Basketball
- Cross Country
- Football
- Soccer
- Track and Field
- Wrestling

Girls

- Basketball
- Cross Country
- Field Hockey
- Track and Field

According to PIAA directory July 2012
