= Mount Gretna Heights, Pennsylvania =

Unincorporated community in Pennsylvania, US

- Census-designated place
- Location in Pennsylvania Location in the United States
- Coordinates: 40°14′55″N 76°28′2″W
- Country: United States
- State: Pennsylvania
- County: Lebanon
- Township: West Cornwall

Area
  - Total: 0.12 sq mi (0.32 km^{2})
  - Land: 0.12 sq mi (0.32 km^{2})
  - Water: 0 sq mi (0.00 km^{2})
- Elevation: 700 ft (210 m)

Population (2020)
  - Total: 297
  - Density: 2,409.9/sq mi (930.46/km^{2})
- Time zone: UTC-5 (Eastern (EST))
  - Summer (DST): UTC-4 (EDT)
- FIPS code: 42-51576
- GNIS feature ID: 1181693

Mount Gretna Heights is an unincorporated community and census-designated place (CDP) in Lebanon County, Pennsylvania, United States, adjacent to the borough of Mount Gretna. The population was 323 at the 2010 census.

== Geography ==
Mount Gretna Heights is located in southern Lebanon County at 40°14′55″N 76°28′2″W (40.248671, -76.467090), in the southwestern part of West Cornwall Township. It is bordered to the southwest by Mount Gretna borough. Pennsylvania Route 117 runs along the northwest edge of the CDP, leading northeast 4 miles (6 km) to Cornwall and southwest 3 miles (5 km) to Colebrook.

According to the United States Census Bureau, the CDP has a total area of 0.12 square miles (0.32 km^{2}), all land. The community is at the headwaters of Conewago Creek, a southwest-flowing tributary of the Susquehanna River.

== Demographics ==
Historical population
Census	Pop.	Note	%±
2020	297		—
U.S. Decennial Census

As of the census of 2000, there were 360 people, 168 households, and 111 families residing in the CDP. The population density was 2,815.5 inhabitants per square mile (1,087.1/km^{2}). There were 292 housing units at an average density of 2,283.7 per square mile (881.7/km^{2}). The racial makeup of the CDP was 95.28% White, 0.56% African American, 0.83% Asian, 0.83% Pacific Islander, 0.28% from other races, and 2.22% from two or more races. Hispanic or Latino of any race were 1.39% of the population.

There were 168 households, out of which 19.6% had children under the age of 18 living with them, 58.9% were married couples living together, 4.2% had a female householder with no husband present, and 33.9% were non-families. 29.2% of all households were made up of individuals, and 7.1% had someone living alone who was 65 years of age or older. The average household size was 2.14 and the average family size was 2.63.

In the CDP, the population was spread out, with 15.8% under the age of 18, 5.8% from 18 to 24, 26.4% from 25 to 44, 33.6% from 45 to 64, and 18.3% who were 65 years of age or older. The median age was 46 years. For every 100 females, there were 92.5 males. For every 100 females age 18 and over, there were 94.2 males.

As of 2000, the median income for a household in the CDP was $46,354, and the median income for a family was $54,750. Males had a median income of $33,750 versus $36,250 for females. The per capita income for the CDP was $25,996. None of the families and 4.6% of the population were living below the poverty line, including no under eighteens and 6.3% of those over 64.
