= Conewago Creek (east) =

Coordinates: 40.17933°N 76.61813°W

Location
- Country: Lebanon, Dauphin and Lancaster Counties, Pennsylvania, United States

Physical characteristics
- Source
  - location: Mount Gretna Heights, Pennsylvania
  - elevation: 1,100 feet (340 m)
- Mouth
  - location: Susquehanna River at Falmouth, Pennsylvania
  - elevation: 261 feet (80 m)
- Length: 23.0 mi (37.0 km)
- Basin size: 52.5 mi^{2} (136 km^{2})

Conewago Creek is a 23.0-mile-long (37.0 km) tributary of the Susquehanna River in Lebanon, Dauphin, and Lancaster counties in Pennsylvania in the United States. The source is at an elevation of 1,100 feet (340 m) at Mount Gretna Heights in Lebanon County. The mouth is the confluence with the Susquehanna River at an elevation of 261 feet (80 m) at the border of Dauphin and Lancaster counties, just south of Three Mile Island in the river and just north of the unincorporated village of Falmouth in Conoy Township, Lancaster County.

== Name ==
The name of the creek comes from the Lenape, meaning "at the rapids". The rapids are the Conewago Falls in the Susquehanna River, which also give their name to the other Conewago Creek, whose mouth is on the west bank of the Susquehanna River in York County, only 1.6 miles (2.6 km) south of the mouth of this Conewago Creek.

== Course ==
Conewago Creek flows generally southwest its entire length. The source is in Lebanon County in West Cornwall Township near the census-designated place of Mount Gretna Heights. It then flows through the borough of Mount Gretna and into South Londonderry Township and the census-designated place of Timber Hills. A small southern portion of South Annville Township is also in the watershed.

As Conewago Creek leaves Lebanon County, it forms the border between Dauphin County (to the north) and Lancaster County (to the south). In Dauphin County, the creek runs by Conewago Township first, then Londonderry Township. In Lancaster County, it runs by Mount Joy Township, West Donegal Township, just north of the borough of Elizabethtown, and finally Conoy Township.

== Watershed ==
The Conewago Creek watershed has a total area of 52.5 square miles (136 km^{2}) and is part of the larger Chesapeake Bay drainage basin via the Susquehanna River. 53% of the watershed by area is given to agriculture. 15.8 miles (25.4 km) of Conewago Creek downstream of its confluence with Little Conewago Creek are impaired, that is they are "too polluted to sustain the kind of fish and other aquatic life that it could sustain if it were a healthy stream." Sections of four other tributaries, including Lynch Run, Hoffer Creek, and two unnamed tributaries, are also impaired. Agricultural surface runoff and sediment are the major pollutants.

=== Tributaries ===
- Little Conewago Creek
- Hoffer Creek
- Brills Run
- Lynch Run

== Recreation ==
Edward Gertler writes that Conewago Creek is "a fascinating little creek that is alternately either very easy or very exciting". Canoeing and kayaking on Conewago Creek are possible when the water is high enough (in spring and after hard rain), with 11.6 miles (18.7 km) of Class 1 to 3 whitewater located upstream of the mouth.

Several hiking trails are located in the Conewago Creek watershed, including the Conewago Recreational Trail, Lebanon Valley Rails-to-Trail, and Horse Shoe Trail.

Public hunting, trapping, and fishing are available on the 2,793 acres (1,130 ha) of Pennsylvania State Game Lands No. 145 in Lebanon County. Conewago Creek between Dauphin and Lancaster counties has been designated as approved trout waters by the Pennsylvania Fish and Boat Commission. This means the waters will be stocked with trout and may be fished during trout season.

== See also ==
- List of rivers of Pennsylvania
