= Dr. B. Stauffer House =

Historic house in Pennsylvania, United States

- U.S. National Register of Historic Places
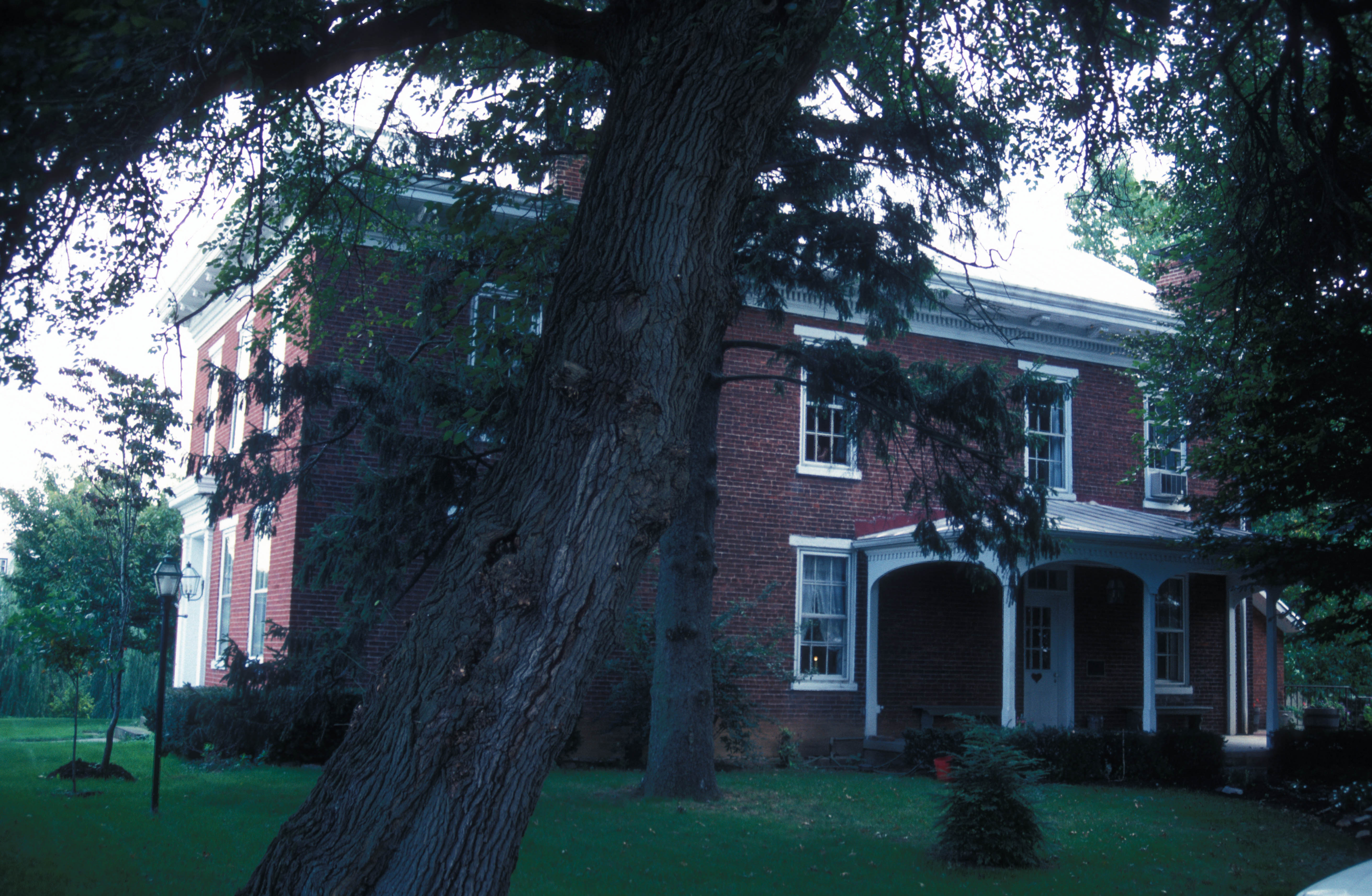

- Location within Pennsylvania Location within the United States
- Location: 192 W. Main St., South Londonderry Township, Pennsylvania
- Coordinates: 40°16′37″N 76°35′28″W
- Area: 0.2 acres (0.081 ha)
- Built: 1848
- Architectural style: Georgian, Germanic vernacular
- NRHP reference No.: 79002286
- Added to NRHP: June 22, 1979

Dr. B. Stauffer House is a historic home located at South Londonderry Township, Lebanon County, Pennsylvania. It was built in 1848, and is a 2 1/2-story, 3-bay wide by 4-bay brick residence in a vernacular Georgian style. It has a hipped roof with a flat roofed dormer over the central bay. The house has a connected brick smokehouse and features a two-story verandah. The house once included an apothecary shop.

It was added to the National Register of Historic Places in 1979.
