= Shelley Island =

Island in the Susquehanna River in Pennsylvania, USA

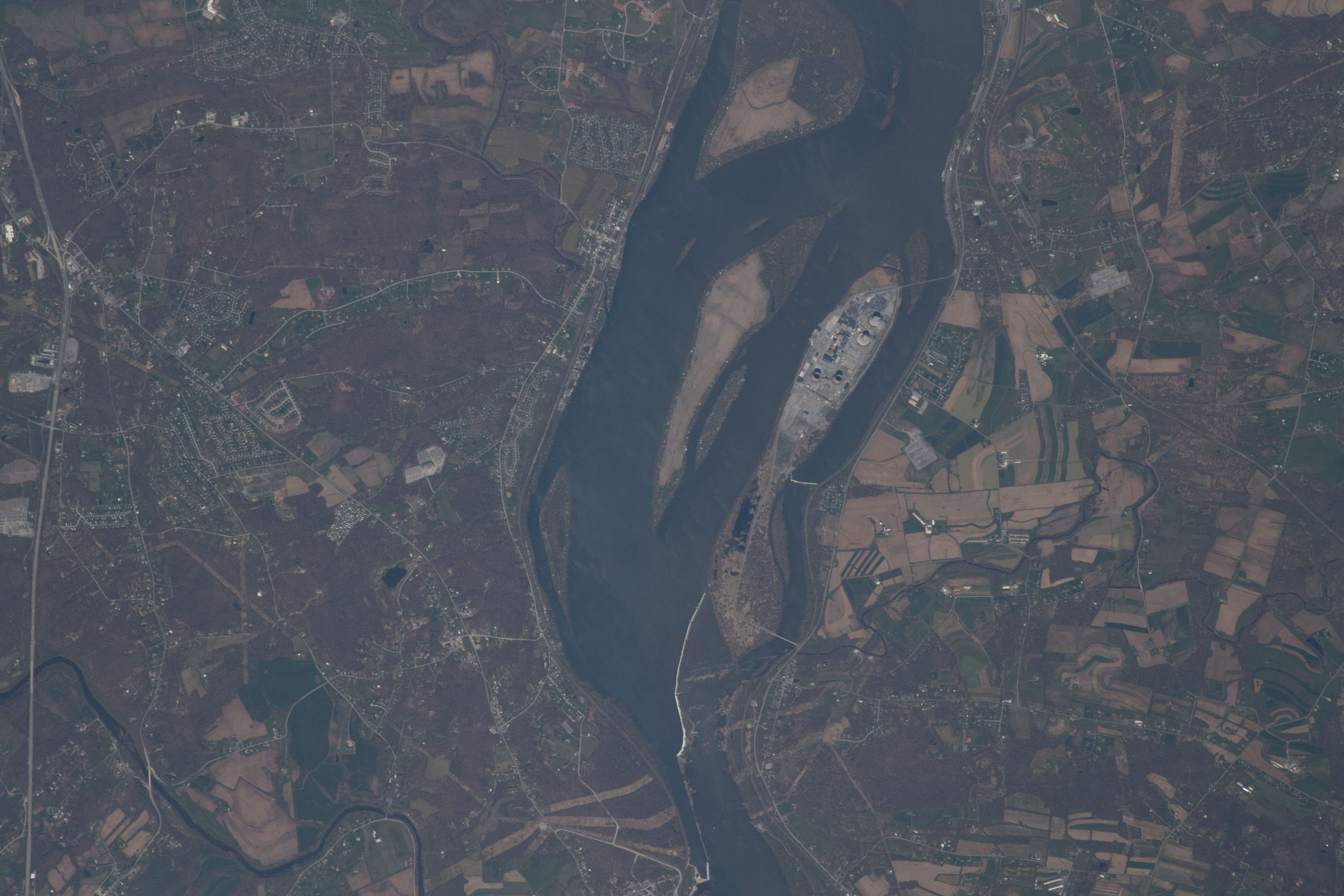
- Shelley island at center with Three Mile Island to the right

- Location within Pennsylvania

Geography
- Location: Susquehanna River
- Coordinates: 40.1517598°N 76.7355243°W
- Total islands: 1
- Highest elevation: 285 ft (86.9 m)

Administration
- United States

Shelley Island is an island located in Londonderry Township, Pennsylvania, on the Susquehanna River.

== History ==
Shelley Island was deeded to the Shelley family by the Penn family in the mid-to-late 1700s. Originally part of Lancaster County, Pennsylvania, it became part of Dauphin County, Pennsylvania in 1785. The Shelley family occupied and farmed the land on the island for over 150 years before selling it in 1895. In that time, Shelley Island was also well-known for shad fishing. During the American Revolutionary War, Daniel Shelley, then owner of the island, staged a plot to destroy American munitions to aid the British cause. His plot was discovered and he fled the island, later to be jailed in Carlisle, Pennsylvania.

By 1903, multiple families lived year-round on Shelley Island and petitioned the township to build them a school house and provide a teacher for the island. Initially reluctant, due to the challenges associated with staffing a school on a remote island, especially during the winter months when the river would freeze, the Pennsylvania State Department of Public Instruction compelled the township to provision such a school, which was in use until 1931. Due to annual safety threats for residents of the island during the winter months, notably in 1904, by early the 1930s Shelley island was largely a seasonal destination.

By the mid 1930s, two summer camps operated on Shelley Island. Camp Rogers, a camp for church choir boys located on the north side of the island, was operated by St. James Church of Lancaster. Camp Susquehannock, located on the middle and southern parts of the island, was run by the York County Girl Scouts starting in 1935.

While the island was farmed during the early 1930s, due to the logistical challenges of bringing farm equipment across the Susquehanna River, the 125 acres of Shelley Island sat empty until around 1956. At the time, the farmers for Shelley Island also grew crops on nearby Three Mile Island. When the latter was purchased for development into a nuclear power plant by Met-Ed in the late 1960s, all homes within 2000 feet of the reactor buildings were required to be removed, which included multiple homes on Shelley Island. At this time, farming was relegated only to Shelley Island.

== FEMA investigation and partial closure ==
During the 2011 Atlantic hurricane season, Hurricane Irene and Tropical Storm Lee produced record-breaking flooding of the Susquehanna River. Homeowners on Shelley Island and nearby Bashore Island filed damage claims through the National Flood Insurance Program totaling about $4 million. Due to the extent of these damages, the Federal Emergency Management Agency (FEMA), surveyed Shelley Island and discovered that many properties lacked proper sewage systems, and did not comply with flood-plain regulations. Since homes on the island were largely constructed on land leased by the York Haven Power Company, and the homeowners did not own the land themselves, the company decided to terminate its leases with residents rather than comply with FEMA orders, forcing residents to vacate the island and remove their property by 2019. Private land on the tip of the island, known as Bare's Tip, was not owned by the York Haven Power Company, and still maintains around 20 homes for seasonal use.
