= Colebrook Iron Master's House =

Historic house in Pennsylvania, United States

- U.S. National Register of Historic Places
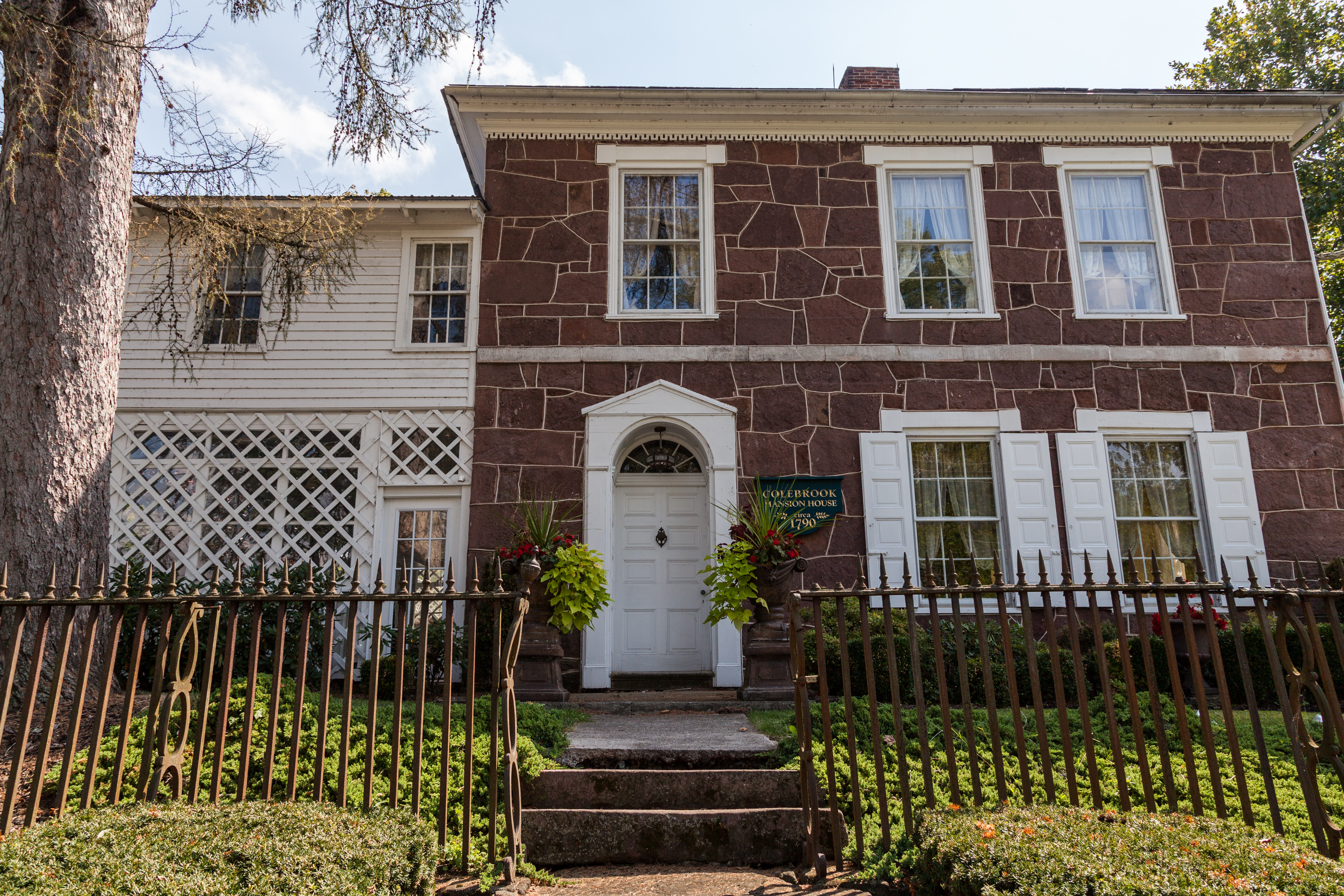

- Location within Pennsylvania Location within the United States
- Location: 5200 Elizabethtown Rd., South Londonderry Township, Pennsylvania
- Coordinates: 40°14′21″N 76°30′46″W
- Area: 9 acres (3.6 ha)
- Built: c. 1791-1796
- Architectural style: Georgian
- NRHP reference No.: 10000405
- Added to NRHP: June 28, 2010

Colebrook Iron Master's House, also known as the Colebrook Mansion and Colebrook Estate, is a historic home located at South Londonderry Township, Lebanon County, Pennsylvania. It was built between about 1791 and 1796, and is a 2 1/2-story, 3-bay wide by 2-bay brownstone residence in a vernacular Georgian style. Also on the property are a contributing spring house, kitchen house, stable, privy, carriage shed, spring trough, and an 18th-century iron fence.

It was added to the National Register of Historic Places in 2010.
