= Quentin, Pennsylvania =

Unincorporated community in Pennsylvania, US

- Census-designated place
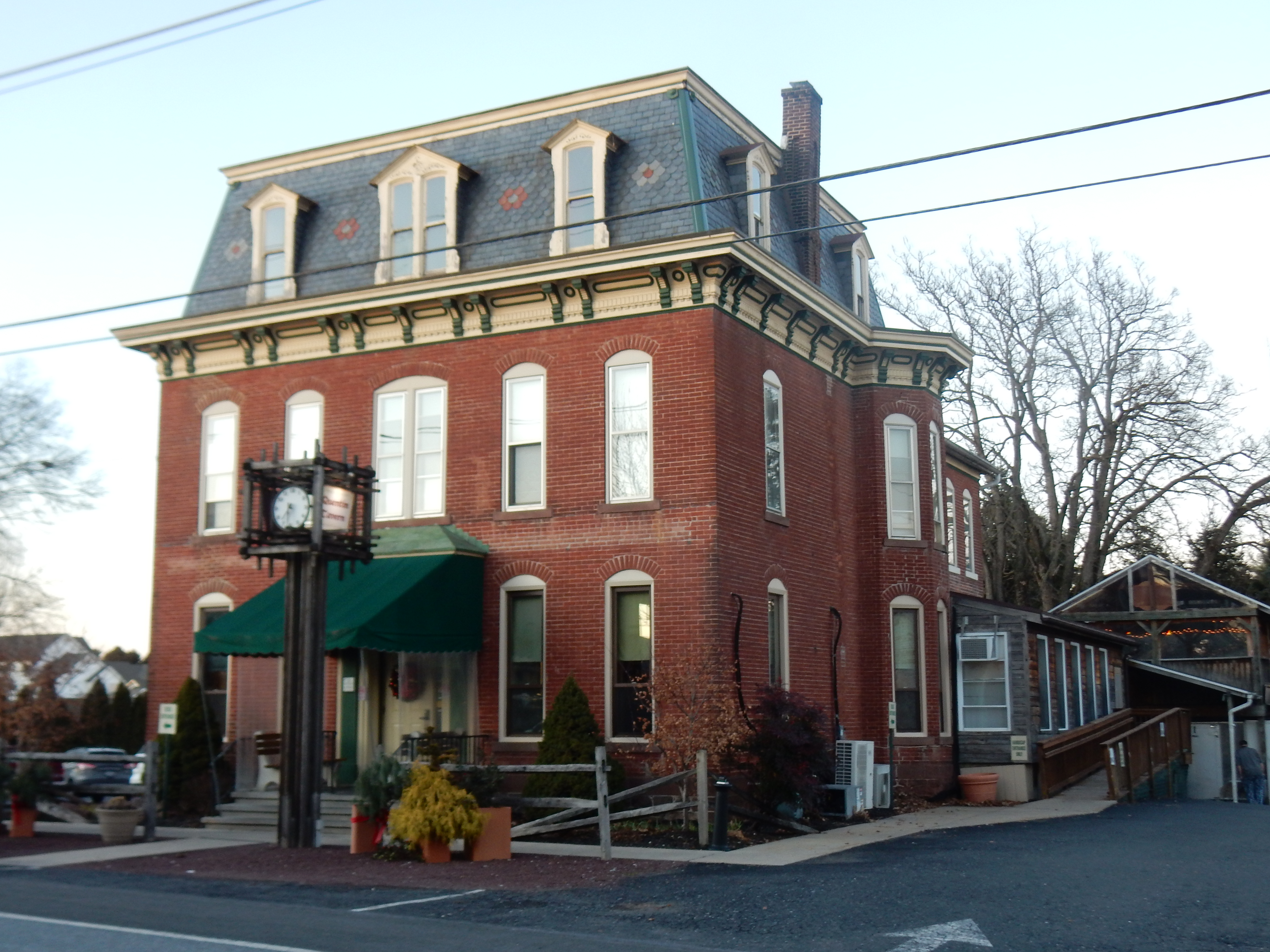
- Quentin Tavern on W. Main St.

- Location in Pennsylvania Location in the United States
- Coordinates: 40°16′46″N 76°26′23″W
- Country: United States
- State: Pennsylvania
- County: Lebanon
- Townships: West Cornwall

Area
  - Total: 1.09 sq mi (2.83 km^{2})
  - Land: 1.09 sq mi (2.83 km^{2})
  - Water: 0 sq mi (0.00 km^{2})
- Elevation: 560 ft (170 m)

Population (2020)
  - Total: 755
  - Density: 691.2/sq mi (266.87/km^{2})
- Time zone: UTC-5 (Eastern (EST))
  - Summer (DST): UTC-4 (EDT)
- ZIP code: 17083
- FIPS code: 42-63160
- GNIS feature ID: 1184550

Quentin is an unincorporated community and census-designated place (CDP) in Lebanon County, Pennsylvania, United States. It was named after Quentin Roosevelt, youngest son of President Theodore Roosevelt. The population was 594 at the 2010 census, up from 529 at the 2000 census.

== Name ==
The town was originally named "Bismark", a local spelling of the name of Otto von Bismarck. In October 1920, the name was changed to honor Quentin Roosevelt, who was killed while flying as a fighter pilot during World War I.

== Geography ==
Quentin is located in southern Lebanon County, in the northeast corner of West Cornwall Township. It is bordered to the east by the borough of Cornwall.

U.S. Route 322 forms the southwestern edge of the Quentin CDP; it leads west 26 miles (42 km) to Harrisburg, the state capital, and southeast 17 miles (27 km) to Ephrata in Lancaster County. Pennsylvania Route 72 runs through the eastern side of Quentin, leading north 4 miles (6 km) to Lebanon, the county seat, and south 19 miles (31 km) to Lancaster. Pennsylvania Route 419 passes through the center of Quentin, leading east 8 miles (13 km) to Schaefferstown.

According to the United States Census Bureau, the CDP has a total area of 0.64 square miles (1.65 km^{2}), all land. A tributary of Snitz Creek flows northward through the CDP, leading to Quittapahilla Creek (a tributary of Swatara Creek) in Cleona.

== Demographics ==
Historical population
Census	Pop.	Note	%±
2020	755		—
U.S. Decennial Census

As of the census of 2000, there were 529 people, 223 households, and 156 families residing in the CDP. The population density was 850.6 inhabitants per square mile (328.4/km^{2}). There were 235 housing units at an average density of 377.9 per square mile (145.9/km^{2}). The racial makeup of the CDP was 98.11% White, 0.38% African American, 0.38% Asian, 0.38% from other races, and 0.76% from two or more races. Hispanic or Latino of any race were 0.95% of the population.

There were 223 households, out of which 28.3% had children under the age of 18 living with them, 57.8% were married couples living together, 9.0% had a female householder with no husband present, and 30.0% were non-families. 25.1% of all households were made up of individuals, and 8.5% had someone living alone who was 65 years of age or older. The average household size was 2.37 and the average family size was 2.83.

In the CDP, the population was spread out, with 19.8% under the age of 18, 7.2% from 18 to 24, 33.1% from 25 to 44, 25.5% from 45 to 64, and 14.4% who were 65 years of age or older. The median age was 39 years. For every 100 females, there were 95.2 males. For every 100 females age 18 and over, there were 91.0 males.

The median income for a household in the CDP was $50,417, and the median income for a family was $53,750. Males had a median income of $37,120 versus $27,292 for females. The per capita income for the CDP was $25,037. About 1.9% of families and 3.2% of the population were below the poverty line, including none of those under age 18 and 14.5% of those age 65 or over.
