= Bindnagles Evangelical Lutheran Church =

Historic church in Pennsylvania, United States

- Bindnagle Evangelical Lutheran Church
- U.S. National Register of Historic Places
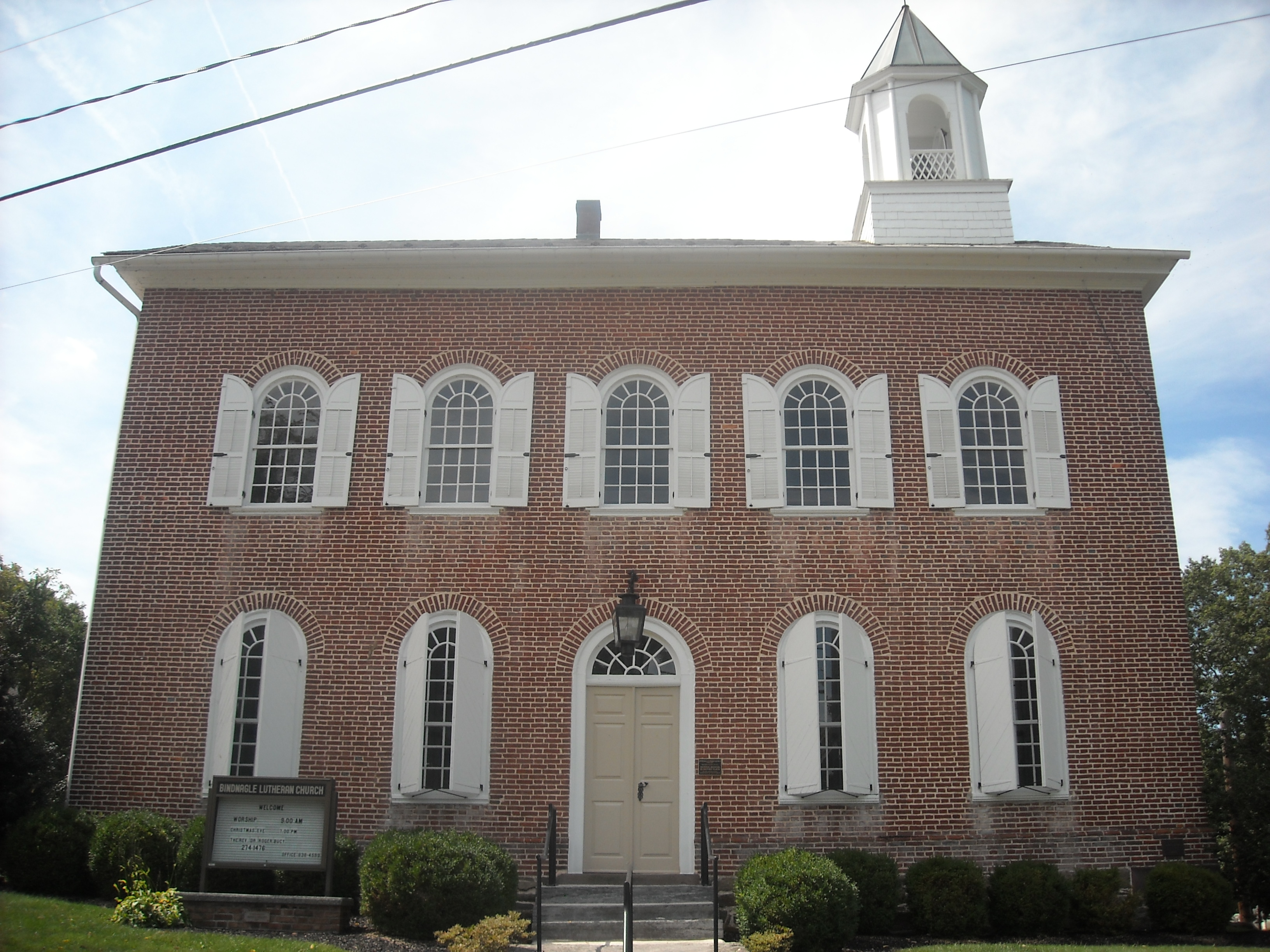
- East face of the church

- Location within Pennsylvania Location within the United States
- Location: North of Palmyra at the junction of Legislative Route 38003 and Township 330, North Londonderry Township, Pennsylvania
- Coordinates: 40°20′38″N 76°37′1″W
- Area: 5 acres (2.0 ha)
- Built: 1803
- Architectural style: Georgian, Georgian vernacular
- NRHP reference No.: 75001651
- Added to NRHP: July 7, 1975

Bindnagle Evangelical Lutheran Church is a historic Evangelical Lutheran church located in North Londonderry Township, Lebanon County, Pennsylvania. It was built in 1803 and is a two-story brick building measuring 36 by 48 feet (11 by 15 m). It is in the Georgian style. Also on the property is a contributing cemetery, with the oldest burial dated to 1774. It is a congregation of the Chicago-based Evangelical Lutheran Church in America.

It was added to the National Register of Historic Places in 1975. The building has been a subject of conservation work.
