= Lawn, Pennsylvania =

Unincorporated community in Pennsylvania, US

- Unincorporated community
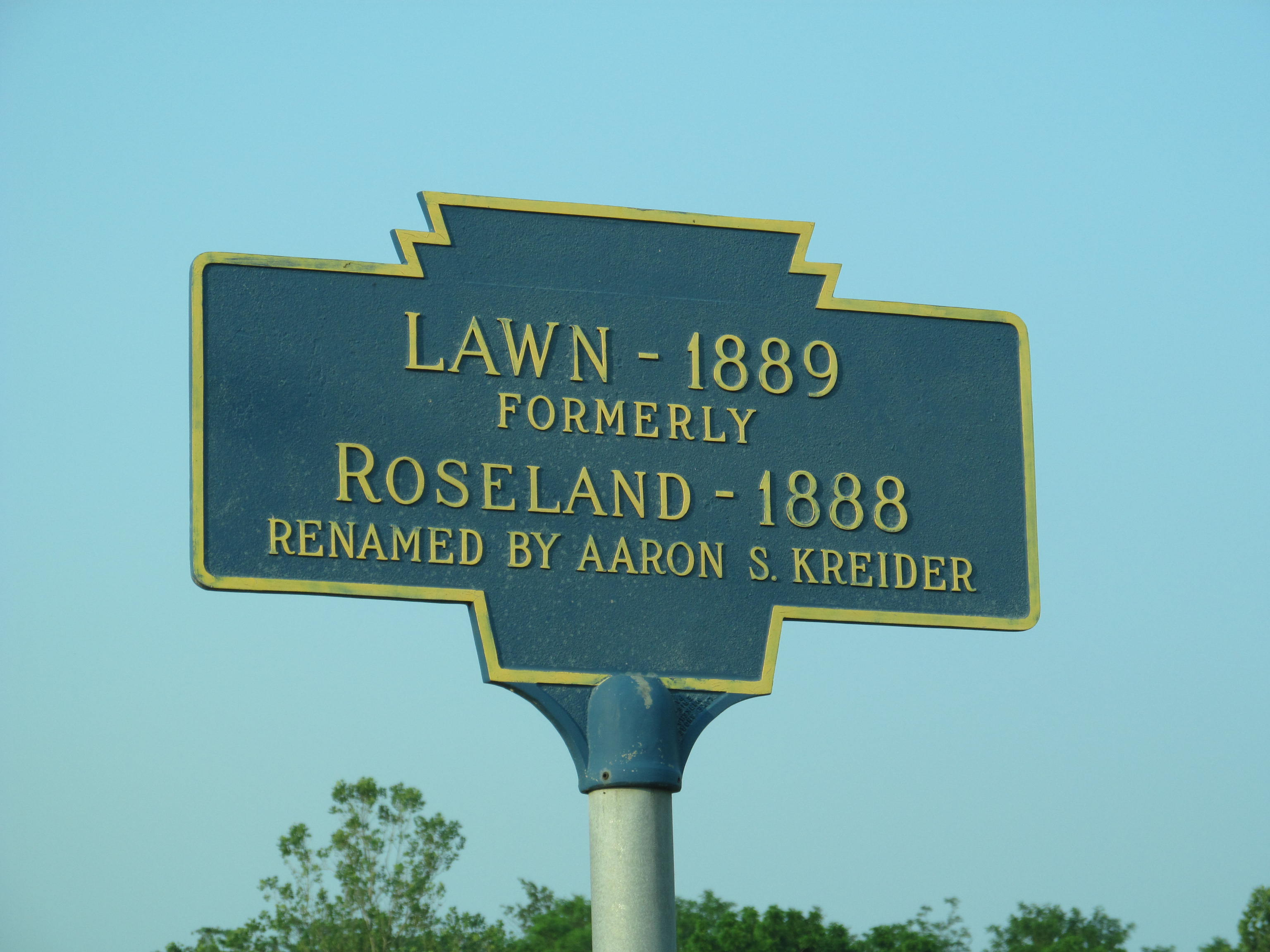
- Keystone Marker

- Location within Pennsylvania Location within the United States
- Coordinates: 40°13′12″N 76°32′21″W
- Country: United States
- State: Pennsylvania
- County: Lebanon
- Township: South Londonderry
- Elevation: 479 ft (146 m)
- Time zone: UTC-5 (Eastern (EST))
  - Summer (DST): UTC-4 (EDT)
- ZIP code: 17041
- Area code: 717
- GNIS feature ID: 1179046

Lawn, previously known as Roseland, is an unincorporated community in South Londonderry Township in Lebanon County, Pennsylvania, United States. Lawn is located at the intersection of Pennsylvania Route 241 and Lawn Road.
