= Londonderry Township, Dauphin County, Pennsylvania =

Township in Pennsylvania, US

Coordinates: 40°12′00″N 76°40′59″W

- Township
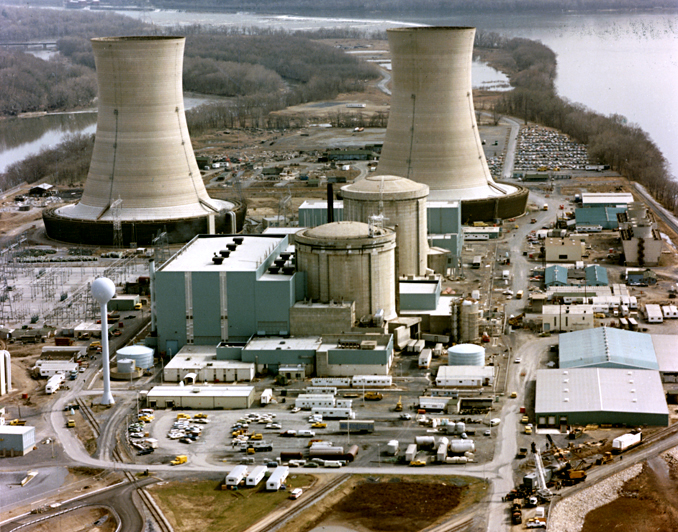
- Three Mile Island

- Location in Dauphin County and state of Pennsylvania.
- Country: United States
- State: Pennsylvania
- County: Dauphin
- Incorporated: 1768

Area
  - Total: 26.93 sq mi (69.74 km^{2})
  - Land: 22.75 sq mi (58.93 km^{2})
  - Water: 4.17 sq mi (10.80 km^{2})

Population (2020)
  - Total: 4,899 ▼
  - Estimate (2023): 4,884
  - Density: 228.6/sq mi (88.25/km^{2})
- Time zone: UTC-5 (Eastern (EST))
  - Summer (DST): UTC-4 (EDT)
- Area code: 717
- FIPS code: 42-043-44464
- Website: londonderrypa.org

Londonderry Township is a township in Dauphin County, Pennsylvania, United States. The population was 4,899 at the 2020 census.

The township includes the Three Mile Island Nuclear Generating Station, the location of the largest accident in the history of the American nuclear power generating industry, which took place in 1979. The nuclear power plant closed in 2019.

== History ==
Londonderry Township originally was part of Derry Township. Since the township was so large and difficult to govern, the residents petitioned the court in 1767 to subdivide the land into two parts, the eastern section to remain Derry and the western to be Londonderry. It is named after County Londonderry in Northern Ireland.

Derry and Londonderry became a part of Dauphin County when it was established in 1785. In 1787, the population of Derry Township was 198. Lebanon County was created in 1813 and created a new Londonderry Township which included the eastern half of the original.

Conewago Township was created in 1850 from southern parts of Derry Township and eastern parts of Londonderry Township.

== Geography ==
Londonderry Township is the southernmost township in Dauphin County. Its western boundary is the western shore of the Susquehanna River, and its southern boundary is formed by Conewago Creek, a tributary. The northwestern boundary of the township follows Swatara Creek, except where the township abuts the borough of Royalton. To the west, across the Susquehanna, is York County, and to the south, across Conewago Creek, is Lancaster County. There are numerous islands in the Susquehanna River within the township, the largest of which are Hill Island, Shelley Island, Three Mile Island, and Bashore Island.

According to the United States Census Bureau, the township has a total area of 26.9 square miles (69.7 km^{2}), of which 22.7 square miles (58.9 km^{2}) is land and 4.2 square miles (10.8 km^{2}), or 15.49%, is water.

== Demographics ==
Historical population
Census	Pop.	Note	%±
2010	5,235		—
2020	4,899		−6.4%
2023 (est.)	4,884		−0.3%
U.S. Decennial Census

As of the census of 2000, there were 5,224 people, 2,004 households, and 1,517 families residing in the township. The population density was 229.4 inhabitants per square mile (88.6/km^{2}). There were 2,095 housing units at an average density of 92.0 per square mile (35.5/km^{2}). The racial makeup of the township was 97.74% White, 0.77% African American, 0.10% Native American, 0.25% Asian, 0.11% from other races, and 1.03% from two or more races. Hispanic or Latino of any race were 0.67% of the population.

There were 2,004 households, out of which 33.6% had children under the age of 18 living with them, 63.2% were married couples living together, 7.9% had a female householder with no husband present, and 24.3% were non-families. 20.6% of all households were made up of individuals, and 7.8% had someone living alone who was 65 years of age or older. The average household size was 2.60 and the average family size was 2.99.

In the township the population was spread out, with 25.1% under the age of 18, 6.3% from 18 to 24, 30.9% from 25 to 44, 25.5% from 45 to 64, and 12.2% who were 65 years of age or older. The median age was 38 years. For every 100 females there were 96.5 males. For every 100 females age 18 and over, there were 97.0 males.

The median income for a household in the township was $42,804, and the median income for a family was $52,650. Males had a median income of $38,750 versus $27,719 for females. The per capita income for the township was $20,055. About 4.1% of families and 7.0% of the population were below the poverty line, including 8.2% of those under age 18 and 9.2% of those age 65 or over.
