= Colebrook, Pennsylvania =

Unincorporated community in Pennsylvania, US

- Unincorporated community
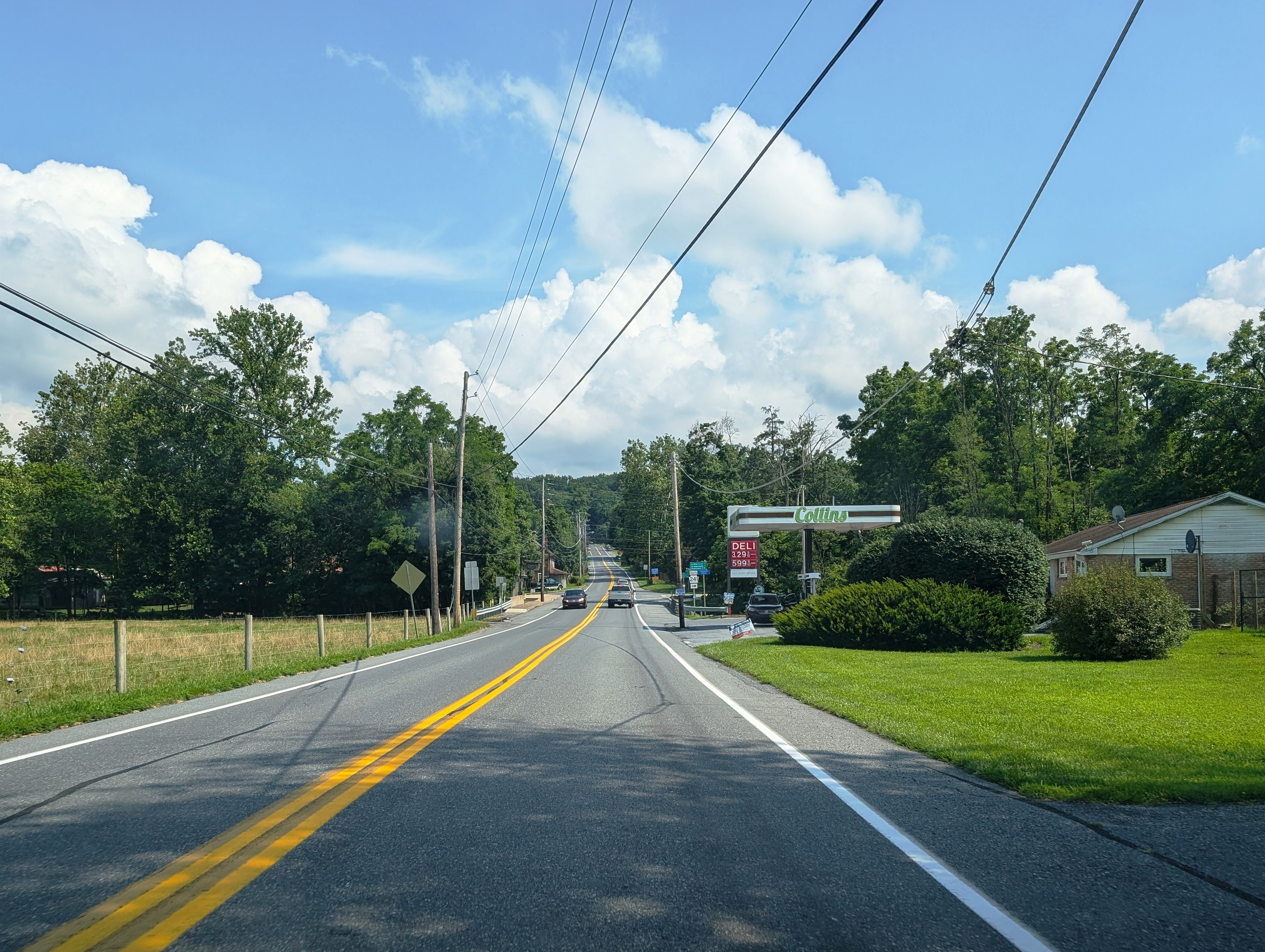
- PA 117/PA 241 southbound in Colebrook

- Location within Pennsylvania Location within the United States
- Coordinates: 40°14′17″N 76°30′40″W
- Country: United States
- State: Pennsylvania
- County: Lebanon
- Township: South Londonderry
- Elevation: 548 ft (167 m)
- Time zone: UTC-5 (Eastern (EST))
  - Summer (DST): UTC-4 (EDT)
- Area code: 717
- GNIS feature ID: 1172180

Colebrook is an unincorporated community in South Londonderry Township in Lebanon County, Pennsylvania, United States. Colebrook is located at the intersection of Pennsylvania Route 117 and Mount Wilson Road just to the south of Pennsylvania Route 241.

The village is named after Robert Coleman, founder of the Colebrook Furnace, who originally owned the land it occupies.
