= West Cornwall Township, Pennsylvania =

Township in Pennsylvania, United States

Coordinates: 40°16′30″N 76°26′59″W

- Township
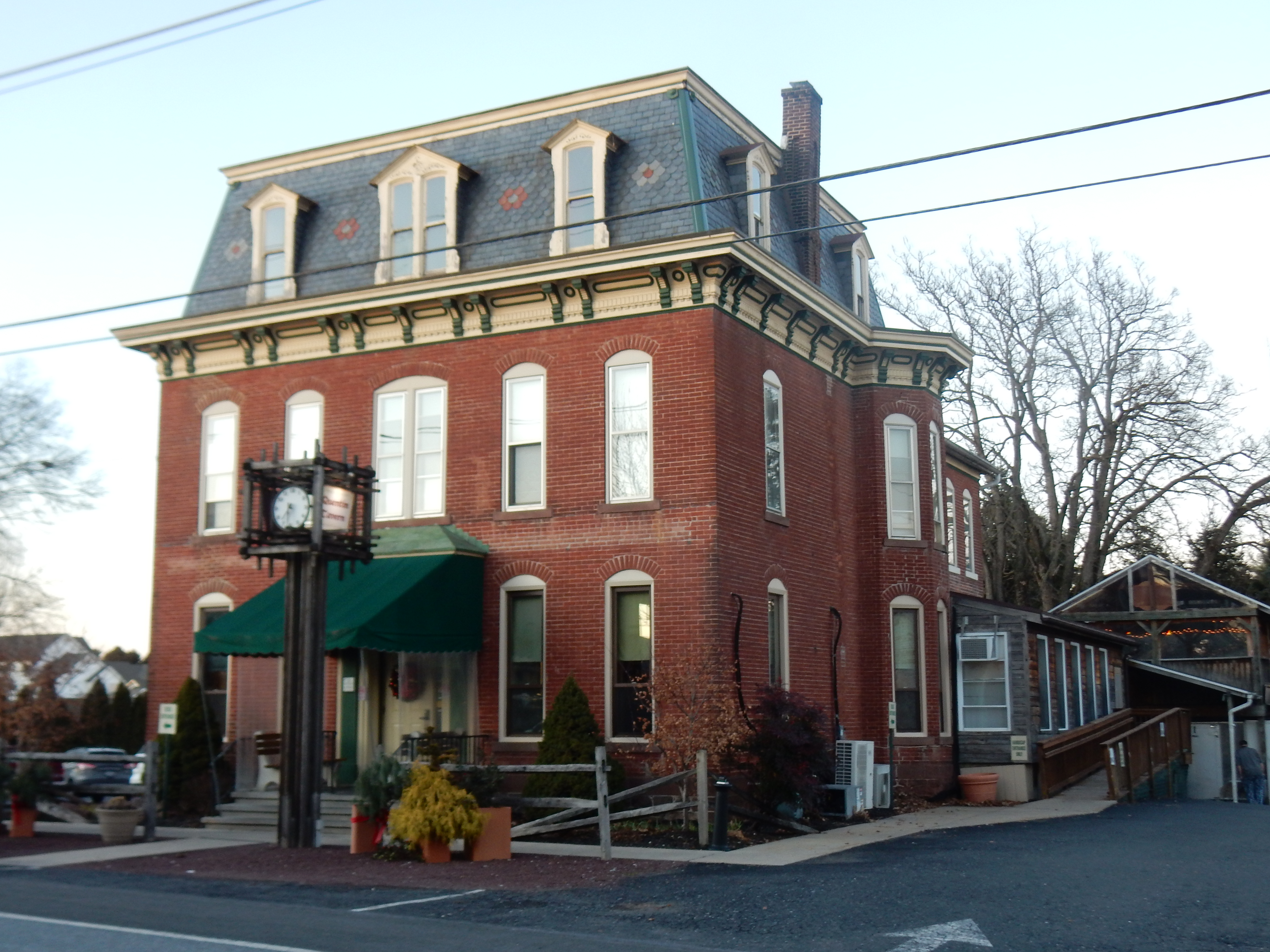
- Quentin Tavern on W. Main St., Quentin

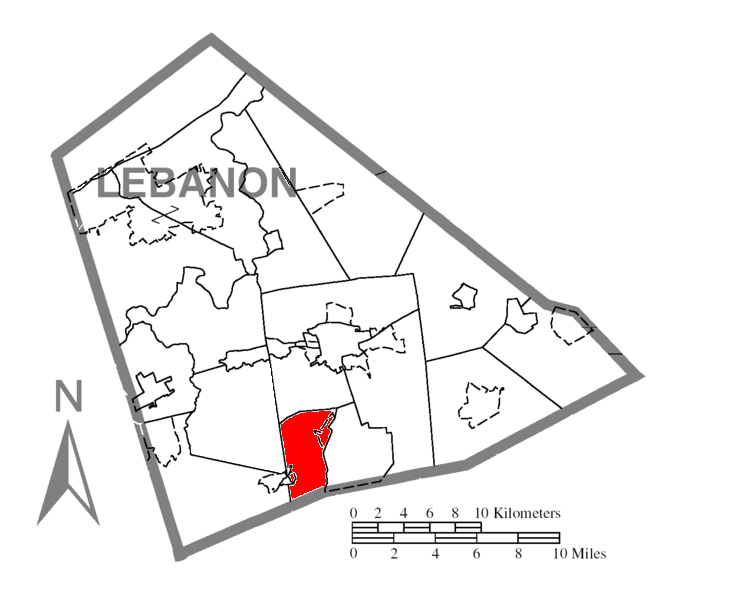
- Location in Lebanon County, Pennsylvania

- Map of Lebanon County, Pennsylvania
- Country: United States
- State: Pennsylvania
- County: Lebanon
- Settled: 1737
- Incorporated: 1893

Area
  - Total: 8.65 sq mi (22.40 km^{2})
  - Land: 8.64 sq mi (22.39 km^{2})
  - Water: 0.0039 sq mi (0.01 km^{2})

Population (2020)
  - Total: 1,987 ▲
  - Estimate (2021): 1,989
  - Density: 232.2/sq mi (89.64/km^{2})
- Time zone: UTC-5 (Eastern (EST))
  - Summer (DST): UTC-4 (EDT)
- Area code: 717
- FIPS code: 42-075-82752
- Website: westcornwalltwp.com

Historical population
Census	Pop.	Note	%±
2000	1,909		—
2010	1,976		3.5%
2020	1,987		0.6%
2021 (est.)	1,989		0.1%
U.S. Decennial Census

West Cornwall Township is a township in Lebanon County, Pennsylvania, United States. It is part of the Lebanon, PA Metropolitan Statistical Area. The population was 1,987 at the 2020 census.

== Geography ==
According to the United States Census Bureau, the township has a total area of 8.7 square miles (22.6 km^{2}), all land. The township includes the unincorporated communities of Quentin in the northeast and Mount Gretna Heights in the southwest.

== Demographics ==
As of the census of 2000, there were 1,909 people, 789 households, and 583 families residing in the township. The population density was 218.9 inhabitants per square mile (84.5/km^{2}). There were 944 housing units at an average density of 108.2 per square mile (41.8/km^{2}). The racial makeup of the township was 96.96% White, 0.68% African American, 0.89% Asian, 0.16% Pacific Islander, 0.21% from other races, and 1.10% from two or more races. Hispanic or Latino of any race were 0.94% of the population.

There were 789 households, out of which 21.5% had children under the age of 18 living with them, 65.5% were married couples living together, 6.2% had a female householder with no husband present, and 26.0% were non-families. 22.6% of all households were made up of individuals, and 10.0% had someone living alone who was 65 years of age or older. The average household size was 2.29 and the average family size was 2.66.

In the township the population was spread out, with 20.4% under the age of 18, 5.4% from 18 to 24, 22.3% from 25 to 44, 27.5% from 45 to 64, and 24.4% who were 65 years of age or older. The median age was 46 years. For every 100 females, there were 97.4 males. For every 100 females age 18 and over, there were 88.6 males.

The median income for a household in the township was $43,333, and the median income for a family was $47,969. Males had a median income of $38,050 versus $32,083 for females. The per capita income for the township was $24,982. About 2.7% of families and 5.9% of the population were below the poverty line, including 2.2% of those under age 18 and 7.5% of those age 65 or over.

== Gallery ==
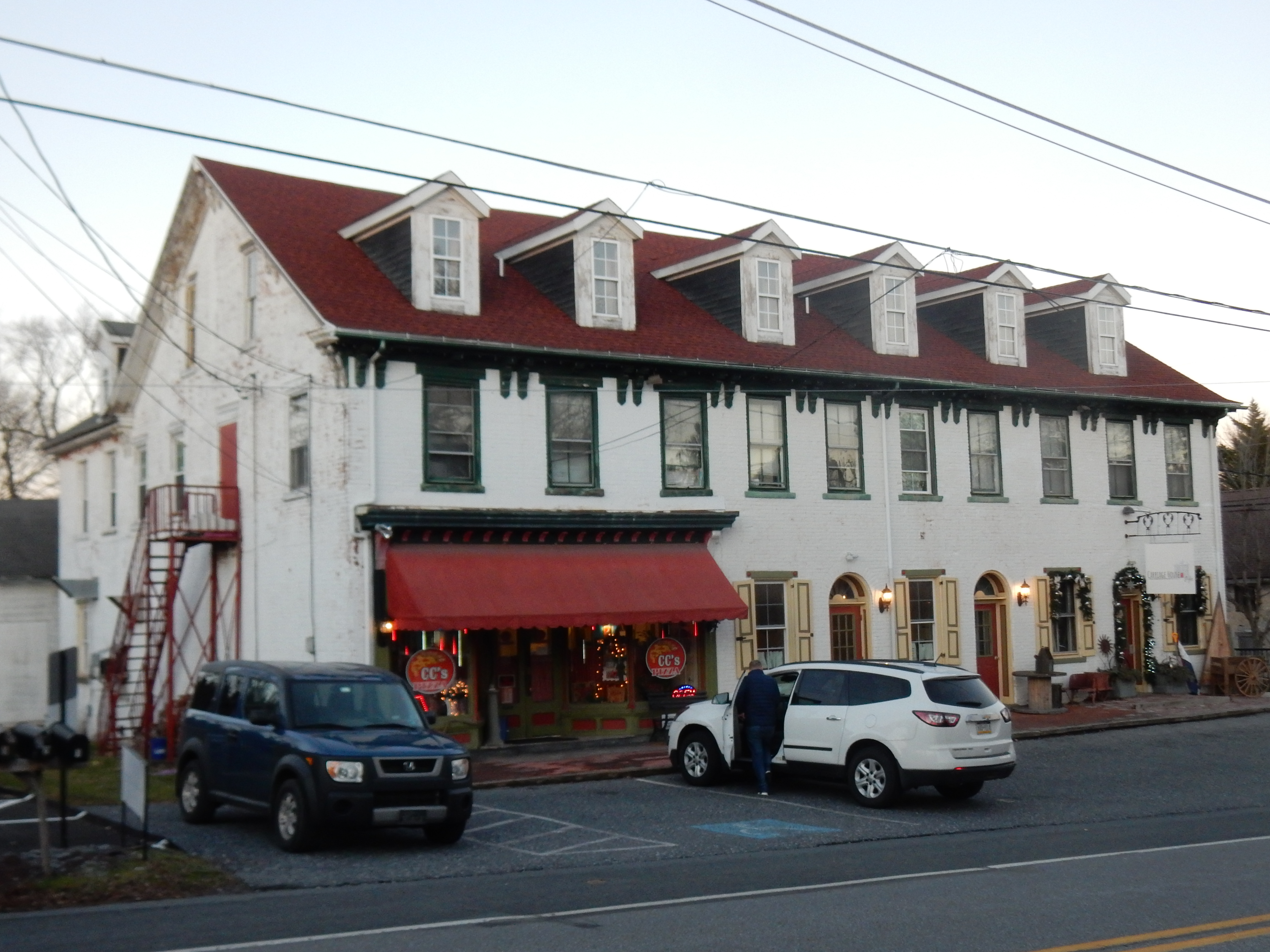
Quentin, West Main St.

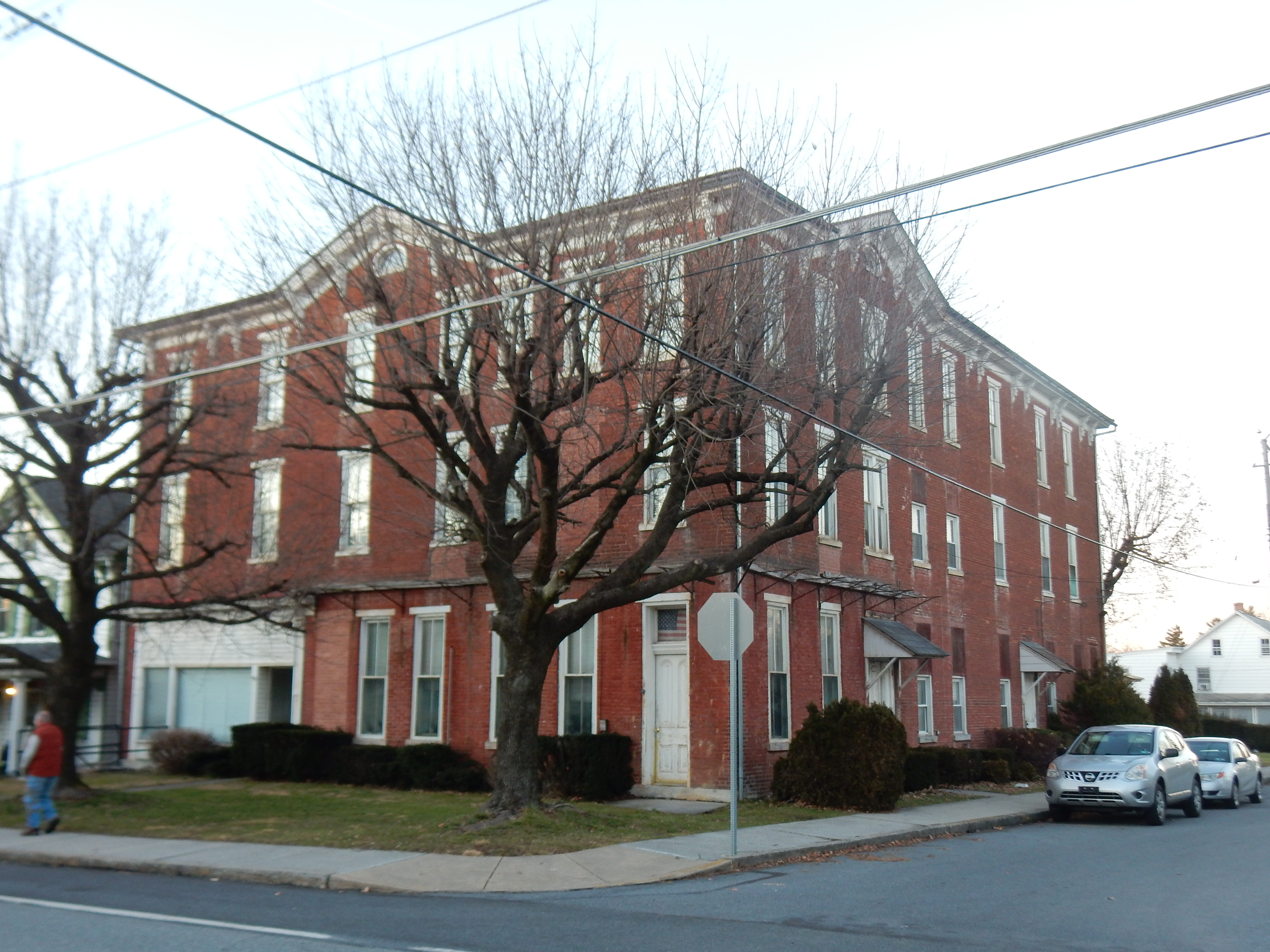
E. Main St.

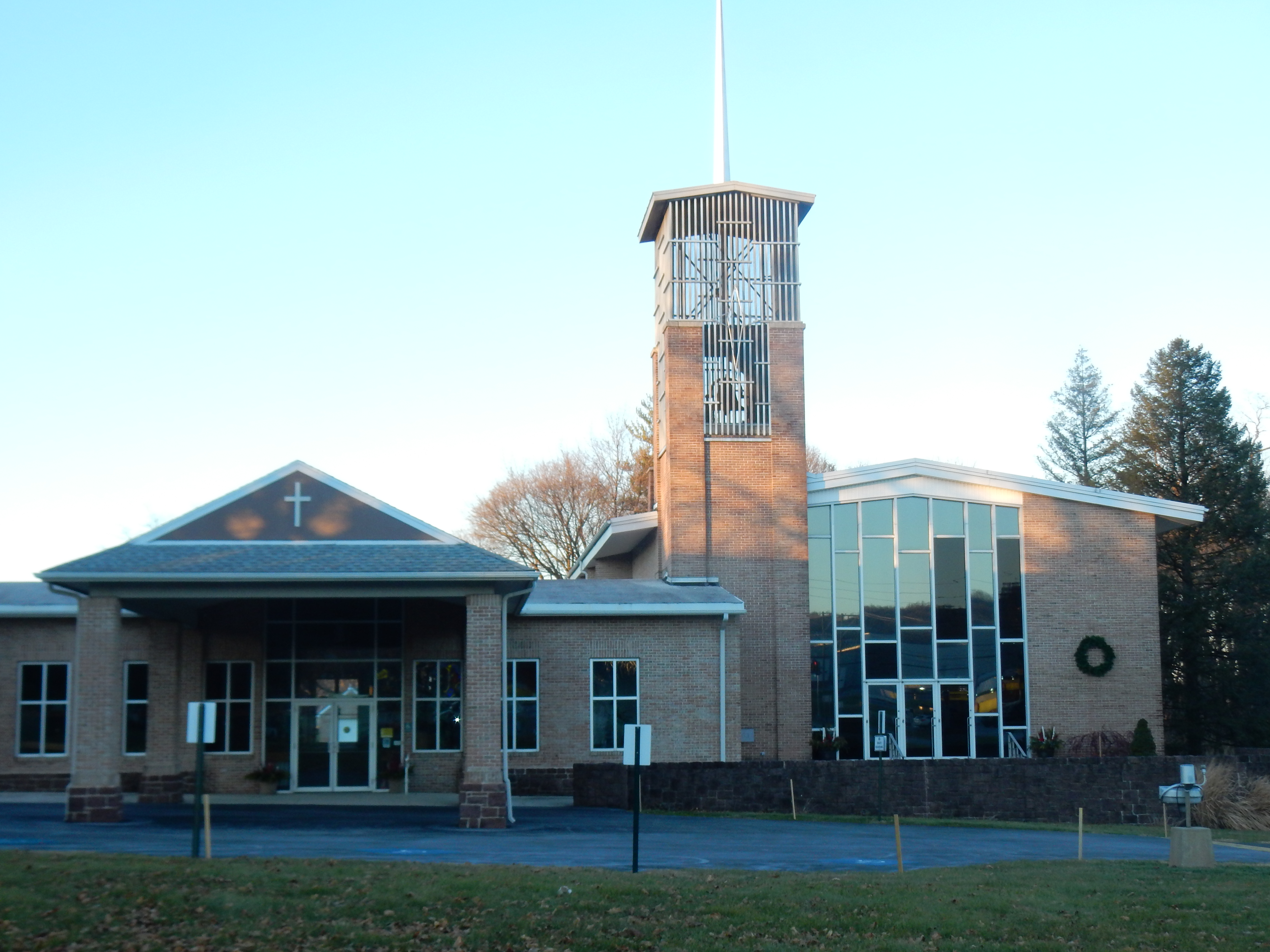
Quentin United Church of Christ
