= Mount Gretna, Pennsylvania =

Borough in Pennsylvania, US

- Borough
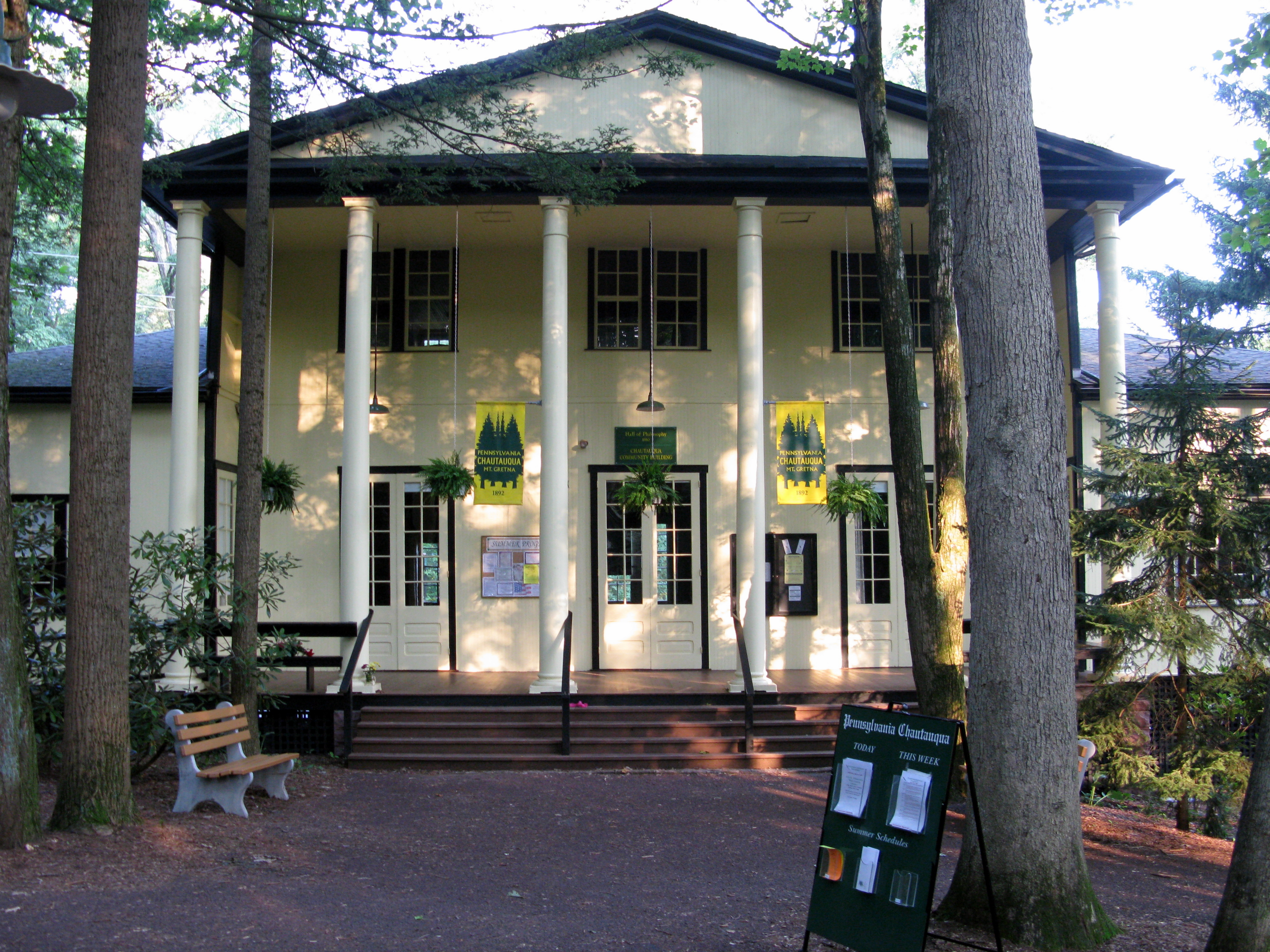
- The Hall of Philosophy, part of the Pennsylvania Chautauqua, on Gettysburg Road

- Location in Lebanon County, Pennsylvania

- Location in Pennsylvania Location in the United States
- Coordinates: 40°14′47″N 76°28′22″W
- Country: United States
- State: Pennsylvania
- County: Lebanon
- Settled: 1889
- Incorporated: 1926

Government
  - Type: Borough Council
  - Mayor: Joseph Shay (R)

Area
  - Total: 0.14 sq mi (0.37 km^{2})
  - Land: 0.14 sq mi (0.37 km^{2})
  - Water: 0 sq mi (0.00 km^{2})

Population (2020)
  - Total: 193
  - Density: 1,338.8/sq mi (516.93/km^{2})
- Time zone: UTC-5 (Eastern (EST))
  - Summer (DST): UTC-4 (EDT)
- ZIP code: 17064
- Area code: 717
- FIPS code: 42-51568
- Website: borough.mtgretna.com

Mount Gretna is a borough in Lebanon County, Pennsylvania, United States. It is part of the Lebanon, PA, Metropolitan statistical area. The population was 188 at the 2020 census. The borough was founded by the Pennsylvania Chautauqua Society, which was attracted by the area's natural landscape and beauty, by the 1890s.

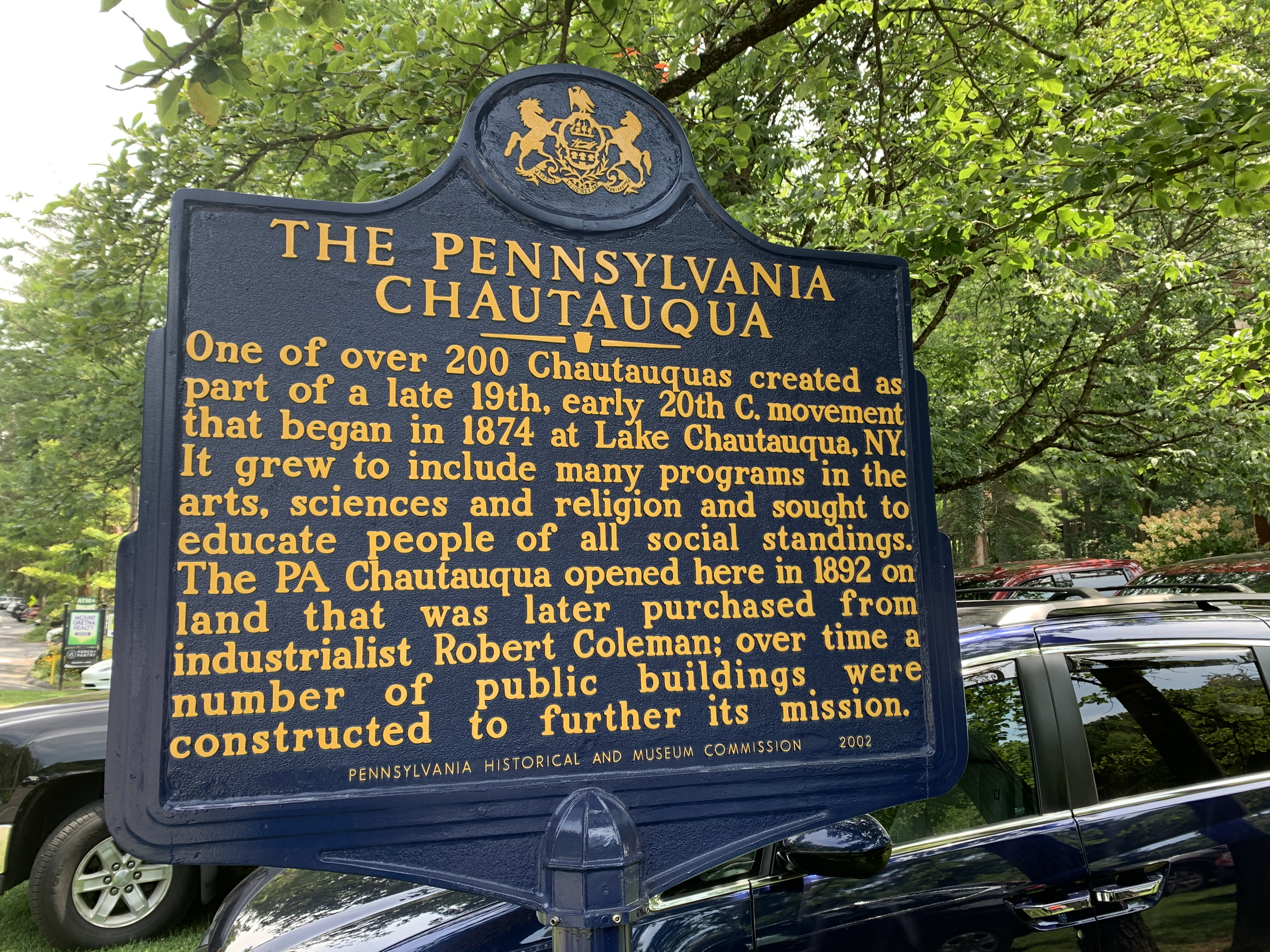
Pennsylvania Chautauqua state historical marker in Mount Gretna

Mount Gretna is a popular destination in the summer. It features a nationally ranked juried art show (third weekend in August), jazz and chamber music concerts, lectures, book reviews, and an annual tour of historic homes and cottages (first Saturday in August). The Connewago Lake features a Victorian-era bathhouse with high-dive, floating docks and a sandy beach area. The community also has a roller rink, open-air playhouse, miniature golf course, several restaurants, playgrounds, and an award-winning ice cream parlor known as the Jigger Shop. Gretna Theatre, the independent professional non-profit theatre company performing at the Mount Gretna Playhouse, is one of the country's oldest summer stock theatres, having opened in 1927. The surrounding area, which includes seven distinct neighborhoods, has a year-round population estimated at 1,500 people. Summertime population increases to about 2,500.

== History ==
Pursuant to a letter written by Hugh Maxwell, an official of the Cornwall and Lebanon Railroad, and sent by him to the Lebanon County Historical Society "and read before them on April 26, 1901", the name "Mount Gretna" was suggested by his wife, subsequently adopted by the board, and "On September 21st 1883 that name appears in public print for the first time in the Lebanon Daily News."

== Geography ==
Border detail of Mount Gretna and surrounding municipalities

Mount Gretna map

Mount Gretna is located at 40°14′47″N 76°28′22″W (40.246525, -76.472899).

According to the United States Census Bureau, the borough has a total area of 0.2 square mile (0.4 km^{2}), all land.

Mount Gretna is divided into seven different sections. These include Mount Gretna Heights, where the Mount Gretna Inn is located; Stoberdale; Campmeeting, where the Tabernacle and church are located, and Chautauqua, where the post office, playhouse, playground, and Jigger Shop are located. The area which includes Conewago Lake and the Timbers Restaurant is called Timber Hills. Conewago Hill, Timber Bridge and Conewago Lake are not technically in Mount Gretna, but are rather located within South Londonderry Township.

Mount Gretna is bordered to the east by West Cornwall Township (0.82 mi), and to the west by South Londonderry Township (1.06 mi).

== Demographics ==
Historical population
Census	Pop.	Note	%±
1930	17		—
1940	42		147.1%
1950	83		97.6%
1960	93		12.0%
1970	153		64.5%
1980	280		83.0%
1990	303		8.2%
2000	242		−20.1%
2010	196		−19.0%
2020	193		−1.5%
2021 (est.)	189	▼	−2.1%

As of the census of 2000, there were 242 people, 117 households, and 74 families residing in Mt. Gretna Borough. The population density was 1,557.5 inhabitants per square mile (601.4/km^{2}). There were 205 housing units at an average density of 1,319.4 per square mile (509.4/km^{2}). The racial makeup of the borough was 99.17% White and 0.83% Asian.

There were 117 households, out of which 13.7% had children under the age of 18 living with them, 61.5% were married couples living together, 2.6% had a female householder with no husband present, and 35.9% were non-families. 27.4% of all households were made up of individuals, and 10.3% had someone living alone who was 65 years of age or older. The average household size was 2.07 and the average family size was 2.53.

In the borough, the population was spread out, with 12.0% under the age of 18, 5.0% from 18 to 24, 18.2% from 25 to 44, 43.0% from 45 to 64, and 21.9% who were 65 years of age or older. The median age was 52 years. For every 100 females there were 106.8 males. For every 100 females age 18 and over, there were 100.9 males.

The median income for a household in the borough was $62,917, and the median income for a family was $87,500. Males had a median income of $43,333 versus $48,125 for females. The per capita income for the borough was $43,470. None of the families and 0.8% of the population were living below the poverty line.

== Notable people ==
- Lois Herr - progressive activist

== See also ==
- List of compositions by Bill McGlaughlin
