= South Londonderry Township, Pennsylvania =

Township in Pennsylvania, US

Coordinates: 40°16′00″N 76°31′59″W

- Township
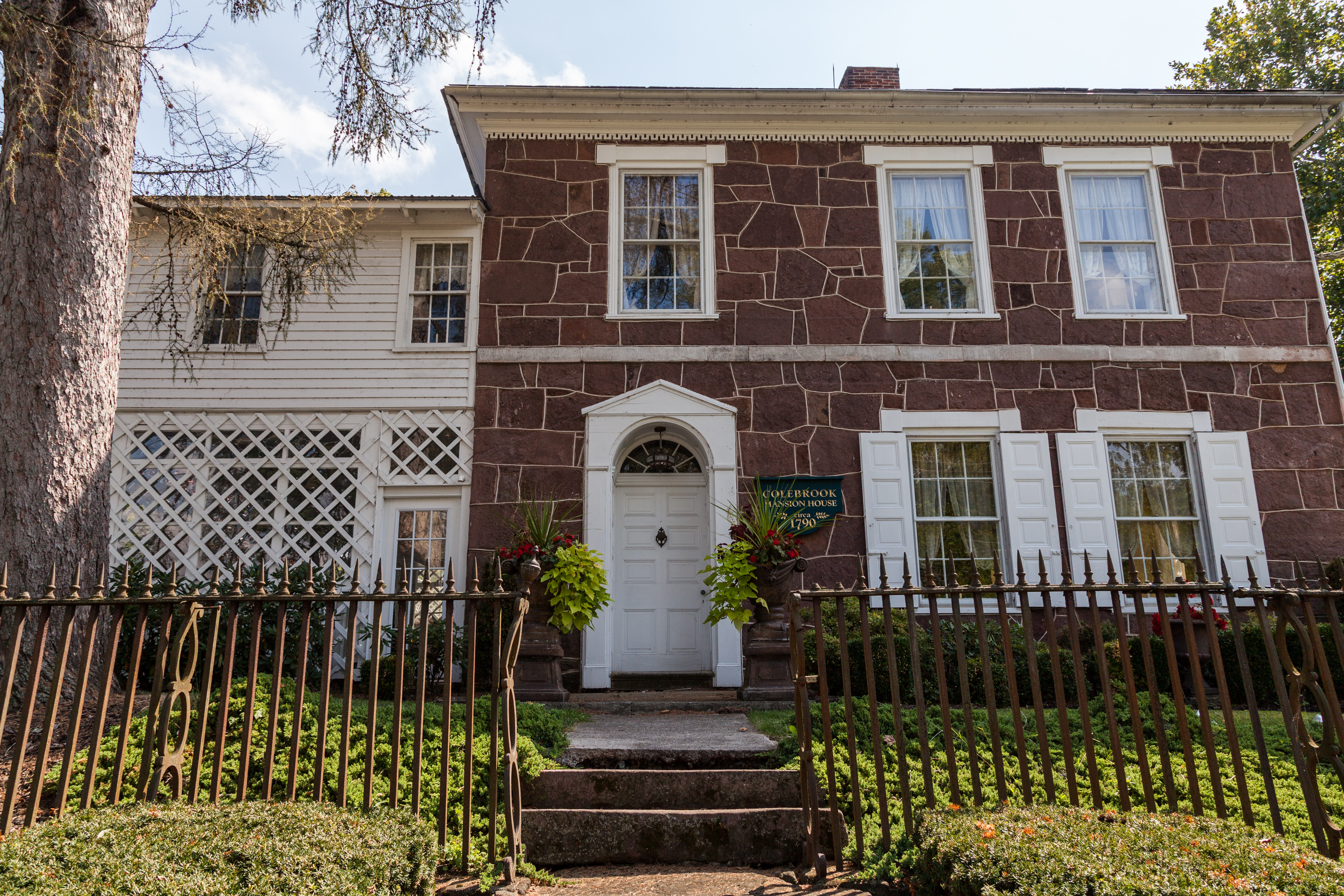
- Colebrook Iron Master's House, built in the 1790s

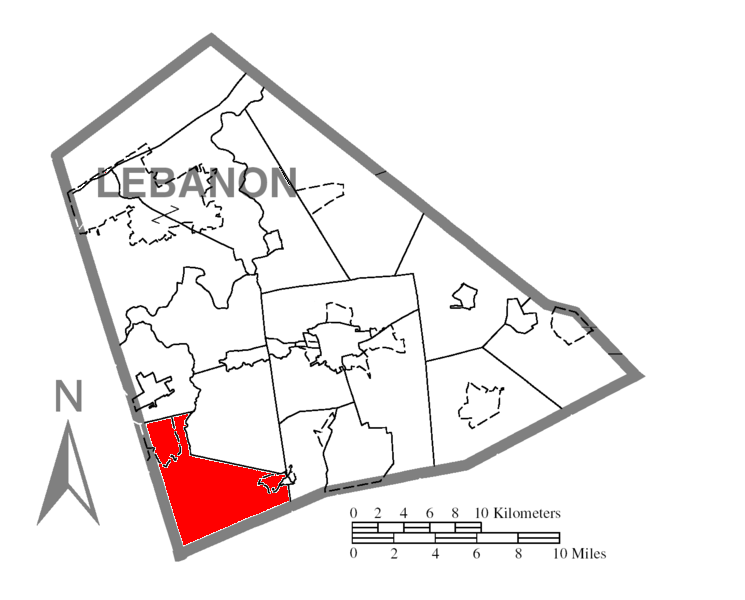
- Location in Lebanon County, Pennsylvania

- Map of Lebanon County, Pennsylvania
- Country: United States
- State: Pennsylvania
- County: Lebanon
- Incorporated: 1894

Area
  - Total: 24.37 sq mi (63.13 km^{2})
  - Land: 24.35 sq mi (63.07 km^{2})
  - Water: 0.023 sq mi (0.06 km^{2})

Population (2020)
  - Total: 8,763
  - Estimate (2021): 8,799
  - Density: 326.2/sq mi (125.93/km^{2})
- Time zone: UTC-5 (Eastern (EST))
  - Summer (DST): UTC-4 (EDT)
- Area code: 717
- FIPS code: 42-075-72296
- Website: www.southlondonderry.org

Historical population
Census	Pop.	Note	%±
2000	5,458		—
2010	6,991		28.1%
2020	8,763		25.3%
2021 (est.)	8,799		0.4%
U.S. Decennial Census

South Londonderry Township is a township in Lebanon County, Pennsylvania, United States. It is part of the Lebanon, PA Metropolitan Statistical Area. The population was 8,763 at the 2020 census.

== History ==
Londonderry Township was originally part of Derry Township, Lancaster County. When Lebanon County was formed, the name was changed to Londonderry Township to distinguish it clearly from neighboring Derry Township, Dauphin County, Pennsylvania.

Londonderry Township was divided into North Londonderry Township and South Londonderry Township in 1894.

The Colebrook Iron Master's House and Dr. B. Stauffer House are listed on the National Register of Historic Places.

== Geography ==
According to the United States Census Bureau, the township has a total area of 24.1 square miles (62.4 km^{2}), of which 24.1 square miles (62.3 km^{2}) is land and 0.04% is water. Two census-designated places are in the township: Campbelltown in the northwest and Timber Hills in the southeast. Other unincorporated communities in the township include Colebrook, Lawn, Upper Lawn, and part of Mount Wilson. The borough of Mount Gretna borders the southeastern side of the township.

== Demographics ==
As of the census of 2000, there were 5,458 people, 2,062 households, and 1,585 families residing in the township. The population density was 226.8 inhabitants per square mile (87.6/km^{2}). There were 2,138 housing units at an average density of 88.9 per square mile (34.3/km^{2}). The racial makeup of the township was 97.86% White, 0.53% African American, 0.04% Native American, 0.71% Asian, 0.20% from other races, and 0.66% from two or more races. Hispanic or Latino of any race were 0.59% of the population.

There were 2,062 households, out of which 34.7% had children under the age of 18 living with them, 67.4% were married couples living together, 6.6% had a female householder with no husband present, and 23.1% were non-families. 19.8% of all households were made up of individuals, and 7.4% had someone living alone who was 65 years of age or older. The average household size was 2.61 and the average family size was 3.02.

In the township the population was spread out, with 25.3% under the age of 18, 5.9% from 18 to 24, 30.7% from 25 to 44, 26.0% from 45 to 64, and 12.1% who were 65 years of age or older. The median age was 39 years. For every 100 females there were 95.3 males. For every 100 females age 18 and over, there were 91.9 males.

The median income for a household in the township was $51,699, and the median income for a family was $63,112. Males had a median income of $43,810 versus $29,116 for females. The per capita income for the township was $24,296. About 0.8% of families and 1.5% of the population were below the poverty line, including 2.8% of those under age 18 and none of those age 65 or over.
