= North Londonderry Township, Pennsylvania =

Township in Pennsylvania, US

Coordinates: 40°19′00″N 76°35′59″W

- Township
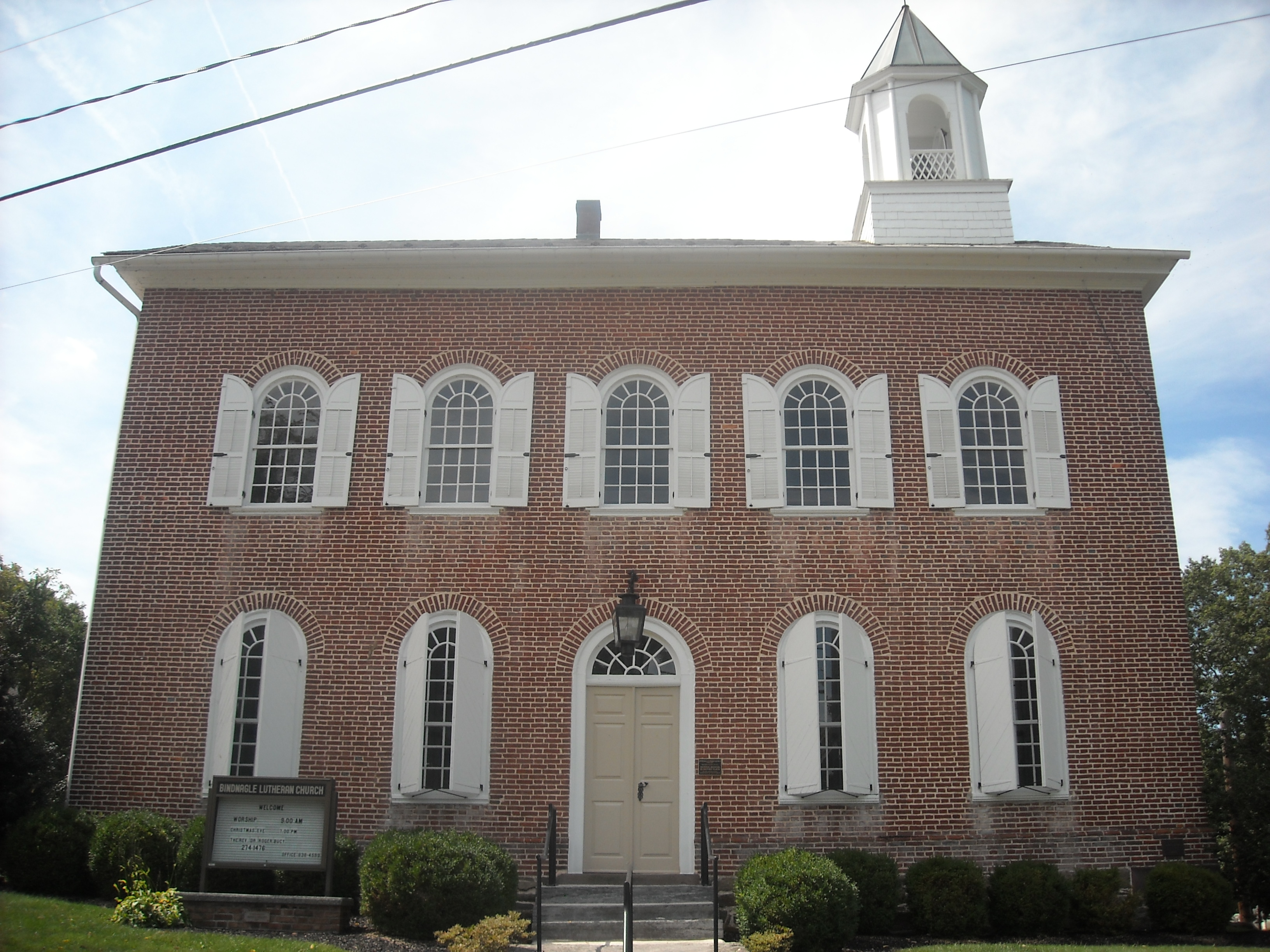
- Bindnagle Evangelical Lutheran Church

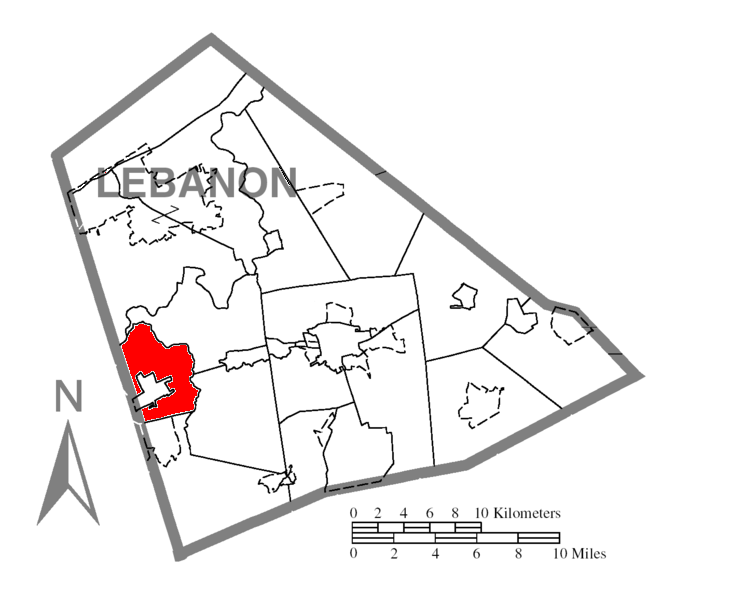
- Location in Lebanon County, Pennsylvania

- Map of Lebanon County, Pennsylvania
- Country: United States
- State: Pennsylvania
- County: Lebanon
- Incorporated: 1894

Area
  - Total: 10.76 sq mi (27.88 km^{2})
  - Land: 10.76 sq mi (27.87 km^{2})
  - Water: 0.0077 sq mi (0.02 km^{2})

Population (2020)
  - Total: 8,912 ▲
  - Estimate (2021): 8,927
  - Density: 786.2/sq mi (303.57/km^{2})
- Time zone: UTC-5 (Eastern (EST))
  - Summer (DST): UTC-4 (EDT)
- Area code: 717
- FIPS code: 42-075-55176
- Website: www.nlondtwp.com

Historical population
Census	Pop.	Note	%±
2000	6,771		—
2010	8,068		19.2%
2020	8,912		10.5%
2021 (est.)	8,927		0.2%
U.S. Decennial Census

North Londonderry Township is a township in Lebanon County, Pennsylvania, United States. It is part of the Lebanon, PA Metropolitan Statistical Area. The population was 8,912 at the 2020 census.

== History ==
Londonderry Township was originally part of Derry Township, Lancaster County. When Lebanon County was formed, the name was changed to Londonderry Township to distinguish it clearly from neighboring Derry Township in Dauphin County.

Londonderry Township was divided into North Londonderry Township and South Londonderry Township in 1894.

Bindnagle Evangelical Lutheran Church was added to the National Register of Historic Places in 1975.

== Geography ==
According to the United States Census Bureau, the township has a total area of 10.8 square miles (28.0 km^{2}), of which 10.8 square miles (28.0 km^{2}) is land and 0.09% is water. It has one unincorporated community, Coffeetown, which is bordered by Palmyra to the south.

== Demographics ==
As of the census of 2000, there were 6,771 people, 2,716 households, and 2,045 families residing in the township. The population density was 626.5 inhabitants per square mile (241.9/km^{2}). There were 2,782 housing units at an average density of 257.4 per square mile (99.4/km^{2}). The racial makeup of the township was 97.78% White, 0.13% African American, 1.26% Asian, 0.21% from other races, and 0.62% from two or more races. Hispanic or Latino of any race were 1.27% of the population.

There were 2,716 households, out of which 28.5% had children under the age of 18 living with them, 68.0% were married couples living together, 5.3% had a female householder with no husband present, and 24.7% were non-families. 21.8% of all households were made up of individuals, and 10.5% had someone living alone who was 65 years of age or older. The average household size was 2.42 and the average family size was 2.82.

In the township the population was spread out, with 20.7% under the age of 18, 4.7% from 18 to 24, 26.9% from 25 to 44, 27.7% from 45 to 64, and 20.0% who were 65 years of age or older. The median age was 44 years. For every 100 females there were 89.6 males. For every 100 females age 18 and over, there were 86.0 males.

The median income for a household in the township was $56,426, and the median income for a family was $68,962. Males had a median income of $41,220 versus $30,019 for females. The per capita income for the township was $27,664. About 2.0% of families and 3.9% of the population were below the poverty line, including 3.7% of those under age 18 and 5.5% of those age 65 or over.

== 2017 township officials ==
- Township Manager: Michael Booth
- Asst. Township Manager: Kristopher Troup
- Secretary/Treasurer: Lisa Daubert
- Asst. Secretary/Treasurer: Judy Miller
- Police Chief: Kevin Snyder
- Roadmaster: Earl Blauch
- Solicitor: Keith Kilgore
- Tax Collector: Lebanon Co. E.I.T. Bureau
- Constable: Daniel Huffman
- E.M.A. Director: Michael Brownsweiger
- Vacancy Board Chairman: James Rothermel

Board of Supervisors:

- Chairman - Ronald Fouché
- Vice-Chairman - Barry Reigle
- Member - William Buckfelder

Planning Commission:

- Chairman - Lane Painter
- Vice-Chairman - Dean Fernsler
- Secretary - Steven Johnson
- Member - Roanld Fouché
- Member - David Biehl

Township Authority:

- Chairman - Boyd Firestone
- Vice-Chairman - Benjamin Dohner
- Secretary/Treasurer - William Buckfelder
- Asst. Secretary/Treasurer - George Ulrich
- Member - Edward Houser

Zoning Hearing Board:

- Frederick Tilberg
- Harry Fox III
- Joanne Wendte

Board of Auditors:

- Chairman - Leroy Leach
- Secretary - Steven Derr
- Member - Charles Randall
