= Northern Lebanon High School =

Public high school in Pennsylvania, United States

Coordinates: 40.4351°N 76.4481°W

Location
- 345 School Drive; Fredericksburg, Pennsylvania 17026-0100; United States

Information
- School type: Public high school
- Motto: To educate our youth is to believe in tomorrow
- Established: 1956
- School district: Northern Lebanon School District
- Principal: Dr. Peter Ebert
- Principal: Tiffany Hogg
- Principal: Joshua Wagner
- Campus Director: Scott Kyper
- Teaching staff: 49.56 (FTE)
- Grades: 7th-12th Grades
- Enrollment: 674 (2018–19)
- Student to teacher ratio: 13.60
- Colors: Blue and Gold
- Mascot: Viking
- Website: www.norleb.org/secondary-school-home

Northern Lebanon High School is a high school in Fredericksburg, Pennsylvania. The High School serves six municipalities: Swatara Township, Union Township, Cold Spring Township, Bethel Township, East Hanover Township, and Jonestown Borough. In the 2018–2019 school year, there were 674 students grades 9th through 12th.

The building also contains the Northern Lebanon School District's middle school, grades 6, 7, and 8. The school's mascot is a Viking.

== Extracurriculars ==
Northern Lebanon High School students have access to a variety of clubs, an honor society, multiple activities and an extensive sports program.

=== Sports ===
The District funds:

Boys

- Baseball - AAA
- Basketball- AAA
- Bowling - AAAA
- Cross Country - AA
- Football - AAA
- Golf - AAA
- Indoor Track and Field - AAAA
- Soccer - AA
- Tennis - AA
- Track and Field - AAA
- Wrestling - AA

Girls

- Basketball - AAA
- Bowling - AAAA
- Cross Country - AA
- Indoor Track and Field - AAA
- Field Hockey - AA
- Soccer (Fall) - AA
- Softball - AAA
- Girls' Tennis - AA
- Track and Field - AAA
- Volleyball - AA

== Notable alumni ==
- Amy Tran - U.S.A. Field Hockey Team
- Russ Diamond - P.A. State Representative
