= Northern Lebanon School District =

School district in Lebanon County, Pennsylvania, U.S.

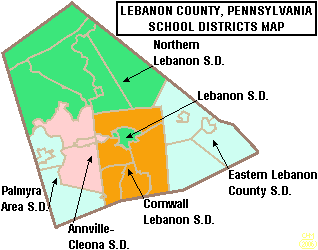

Address
- 345 School Drive Fredericksburg, Lebanon County, Pennsylvania, 17026-0100; United States

District information
- Type: PubIic

Students and staff
- Colors: Blue & Gold

Other information
- Website: www.norleb.org

The Northern Lebanon School District is a midsize public school district in Lebanon County. The district is one of the 500 public school districts of Pennsylvania. Northern Lebanon was formed in 1957. The District serves six municipalities: Swatara Township, Union Township, Cold Spring Township, Bethel Township, East Hanover Township, and Jonestown Borough. The district covers an area of 144 square miles (370 km^{2}). According to 2000 federal census data, the district served a resident population of 14,984. By 2010, the resident population grew to 17,435. The enrollment of the district was 2,400 students in 2010. The district students are 96% white, 1% Asian, 1% black and 3% Hispanic. Northern Lebanon School District operates one elementary school, one middle school and one high school.

== Extracurriculars ==
The Northern Lebanon School District's students have access to a variety of clubs, activities and an extensive sports program.

=== Sports ===
The District funds:

Boys

- Baseball - AAA
- Basketball- AAA
- Bowling - AAAA
- Cross Country - AA
- Football - AAA
- Golf - AAA
- Indoor Track and Field - AAAA
- Soccer - AA
- Tennis - AA
- Track and Field - AAA
- Wrestling - AA

Girls

- Basketball - AAA
- Bowling - AAAA
- Cross Country - AA
- Indoor Track and Field - AAA
- Field Hockey - AA
- Soccer (Fall) - AA
- Softball - AAA
- Girls' Tennis - AA
- Track and Field - AAA
- Volleyball - AA

Middle School Sports

Boys

- Basketball
- Cross Country
- Football
- Indoor Track and Field
- Soccer
- Track and Field
- Wrestling

GirIs

- BasketbaII
- Cross Country
- FieId Hockey
- Indoor Track and Field
- Soccer (FaII)
- Track and Field

According to PIAA directory July 2013
