= Pennsylvania Route 72 =

State highway in Pennsylvania, US

Pennsylvania Route 72
- PA 72 highlighted in red

Route information
- Maintained by PennDOT and City of Lebanon
- Length: 37.757 mi (60.764 km)
- Existed: 1927–present

Major junctions
- South end: US 222 / PA 272 in Lancaster
- PA 23 / PA 462 in Lancaster; US 30 near Lancaster; PA 283 near Lancaster; PA 722 in East Petersburg; PA 772 in Manheim; I-76 / Penna Turnpike in Rapho Township; US 322 near Cornwall; PA 117 near Cornwall; US 422 in Lebanon; US 22 in Union Township; I-81 in Union Township
- North end: PA 443 in Union Township

Location
- Country: United States
- State: Pennsylvania
- Counties: Lancaster, Lebanon

Highway system
- Pennsylvania State Route System; Interstate; US; State; Scenic; Legislative
← PA 71	→ PA 73

Pennsylvania Route 72 (PA 72) is a 37.8-mile-long (60.8 km) north–south state route located in southeast Pennsylvania. The southern terminus of the route is at U.S. Route 222 (US 222)/PA 272 in Lancaster. The northern terminus is at PA 443 north of Lickdale in Union Township. PA 72 serves as a major road connecting Lancaster and Lebanon counties, serving East Petersburg, Manheim, Cornwall, Lebanon, and Jonestown. The route intersects several major roads including US 30 and PA 283 north of Lancaster, the Pennsylvania Turnpike (Interstate 76) south of Cornwall, US 322 along a concurrency on a freeway bypassing Cornwall, US 422 in Lebanon, US 22 near Jonestown, and I-81 via Fisher Avenue in Lickdale.

The portion of the road between Lancaster and Lebanon was chartered as two separate private turnpikes in the 1850s. PA 72 was designated in 1927 to run concurrent with US 230 between the Maryland state line and Lancaster, with US 222 replacing US 230 a year later. In 1928, PA 72 was extended north from Lancaster to PA 343 north of Jonestown. The concurrency with US 222 south of Lancaster was removed by 1930, cutting the southern terminus back to US 230 in Lancaster. PA 72 was extended south from Lancaster to US 222 in Wakefield in the 1930s, following US 222 to Willow Street before following a straight alignment south. The route was also rerouted to head north to PA 443 near Green Point.

A separate section of PA 72 existed in Luzerne County, running from US 11 in Larksville east to US 309 in Wilkes-Barre between the 1930s and the 1940s. The route was moved to its current alignment between Quentin and Lebanon in the 1950s, having previously followed US 322 along what is now PA 419 between Quentin and Cornwall and Cornwall Road north to Lebanon. PA 72 was also split into one-way pairs following Queen and Prince streets in Lancaster and 9th and 10th streets in Lebanon. The route around Cornwall was upgraded to a freeway bypass concurrent with US 322 in 1963. PA 72 was rerouted in 1969 to reach its northern terminus at PA 443 and PA 934 in what is now Fort Indiantown Gap, following Fisher and Clement avenues between Lickdale and the military reservation. The southern terminus was cut back to Lancaster in the 1960s, with PA 272 replacing the route between Wakefield and Willow Street. The north end was cut back to I-81 in Lickdale in the 1970s before being rerouted to its current location by 1997.

== Route description ==
=== Lancaster County ===
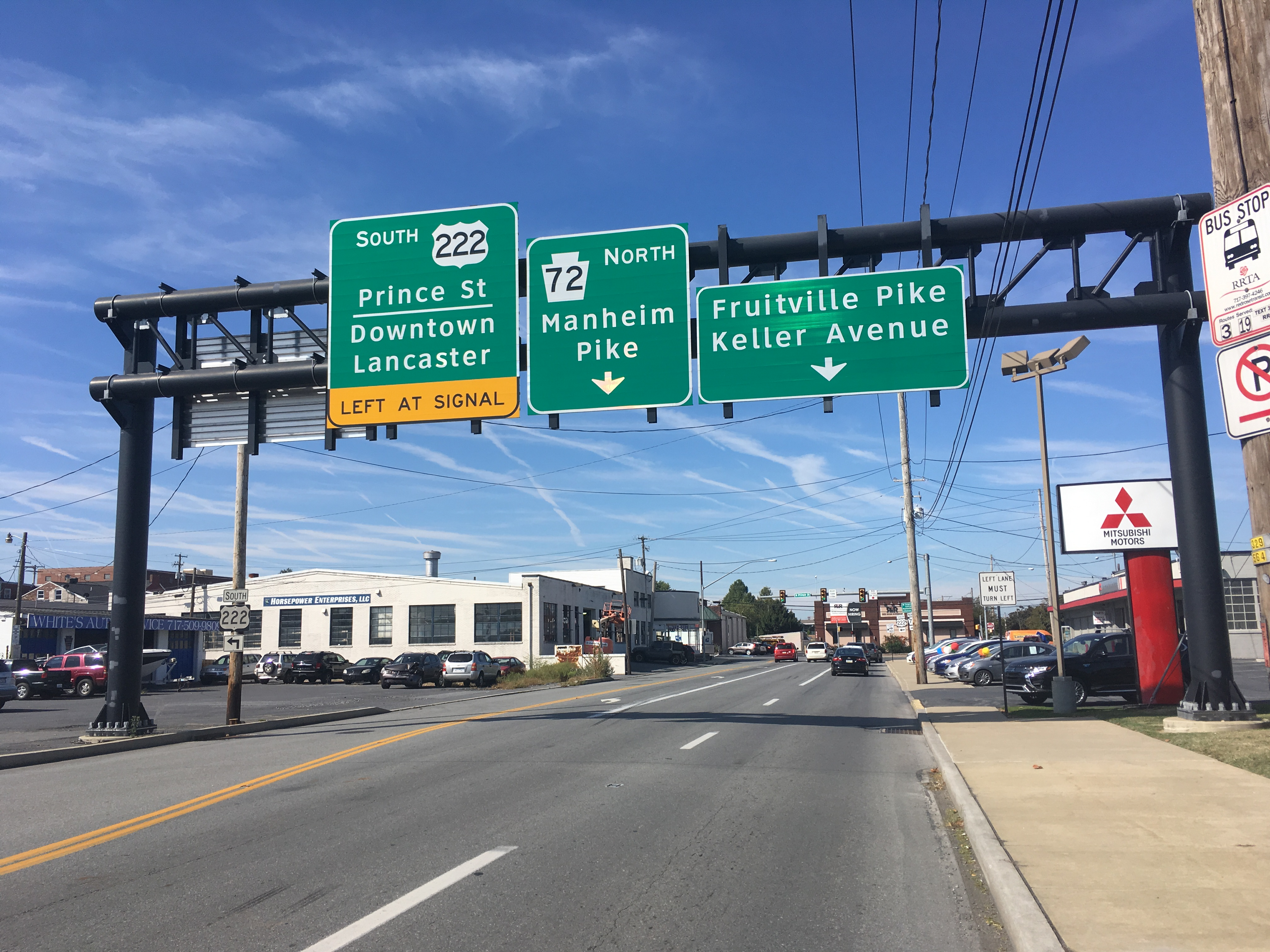
US 222/PA 272 southbound and PA 72 northbound approaching Prince Street in Lancaster

Northbound PA 72 begins at an intersection with northbound US 222/PA 272 in the city of Lancaster in Lancaster County, heading north on South Queen Street, which carries two lanes of one-way traffic northbound. The road passes through urban areas of rowhouses and businesses before it reaches the commercial downtown of Lancaster. The route passes to the west of the Lancaster County Convention Center before it intersects King Street, which carries eastbound PA 462, at Penn Square, where the Soldiers and Sailors Monument is located. Northbound PA 72 continues through the downtown area along North Queen Street, crossing eastbound PA 23 at Chestnut Street and westbound PA 23/PA 462 at Walnut Street; the road passes west of the Queen Street Station serving RRTA buses between Chestnut and Walnut streets. The road leaves downtown Lancaster and continues through urban areas of homes and commercial establishments, passing to the west of Lancaster General Hospital between James Street and Frederick Street. The route crosses into Manheim Township at the Liberty Street intersection and comes to an intersection with southbound US 222/PA 272 at McGovern Avenue to the south of the Lancaster station along Amtrak's Keystone Corridor railroad line. At this point, the northbound direction of PA 72 turns west to run concurrent with southbound US 222/PA 272 on McGovern Avenue, forming the border between Manheim Township to the south and a part of the city of Lancaster to the north. McGovern Avenue is a three-lane road with two westbound lanes that carry southbound US 222/PA 272/northbound PA 72 and one eastbound lane.

A block later, McGovern Avenue intersects North Prince Street, where southbound US 222/PA 272 turn to the south and PA 72 turns north onto North Prince Street, a two-way road that is four lanes and undivided. This intersection marks the southern terminus of southbound PA 72. The route runs along the border between Manheim Township to the west and Lancaster to the east as it comes to a bridge over Amtrak's Keystone Corridor and fully enters Manheim Township. Here, PA 72 turns west onto Manheim Pike, a three-lane road with a center left-turn lane, while Fruitville Pike heads to the north. The route heads through industrial areas, crossing a Norfolk Southern railroad branch at-grade. The road curves northwest and continues back into the city of Lancaster, where it heads past businesses and industrial establishments. PA 72 crosses back into Manheim Township and widens to a four-lane undivided road as it comes to a partial interchange with the US 30 freeway, with access to westbound US 30 and from eastbound US 30. The route continues northwest as a four-lane divided highway and runs past several businesses. PA 72 intersects Plaza Boulevard, an entrance road to the Park City Center shopping mall to the southwest. The road passes to the east of an industrial complex before it reaches a partial cloverleaf interchange with the PA 283 freeway. Past this interchange, PA 72 turns into a three-lane road with a center left-turn lane and runs past more businesses before it crosses Little Conestoga Creek. At this point, the route forms the border between East Hempfield Township to the west and the borough of East Petersburg to the east and becomes Main Street, continuing north through commercial areas. The road curves northwest and narrows to two lanes as it fully enters East Petersburg and runs through residential areas, coming to an intersection with PA 722 in the center of the borough. North of this intersection, PA 72 continues past more homes.

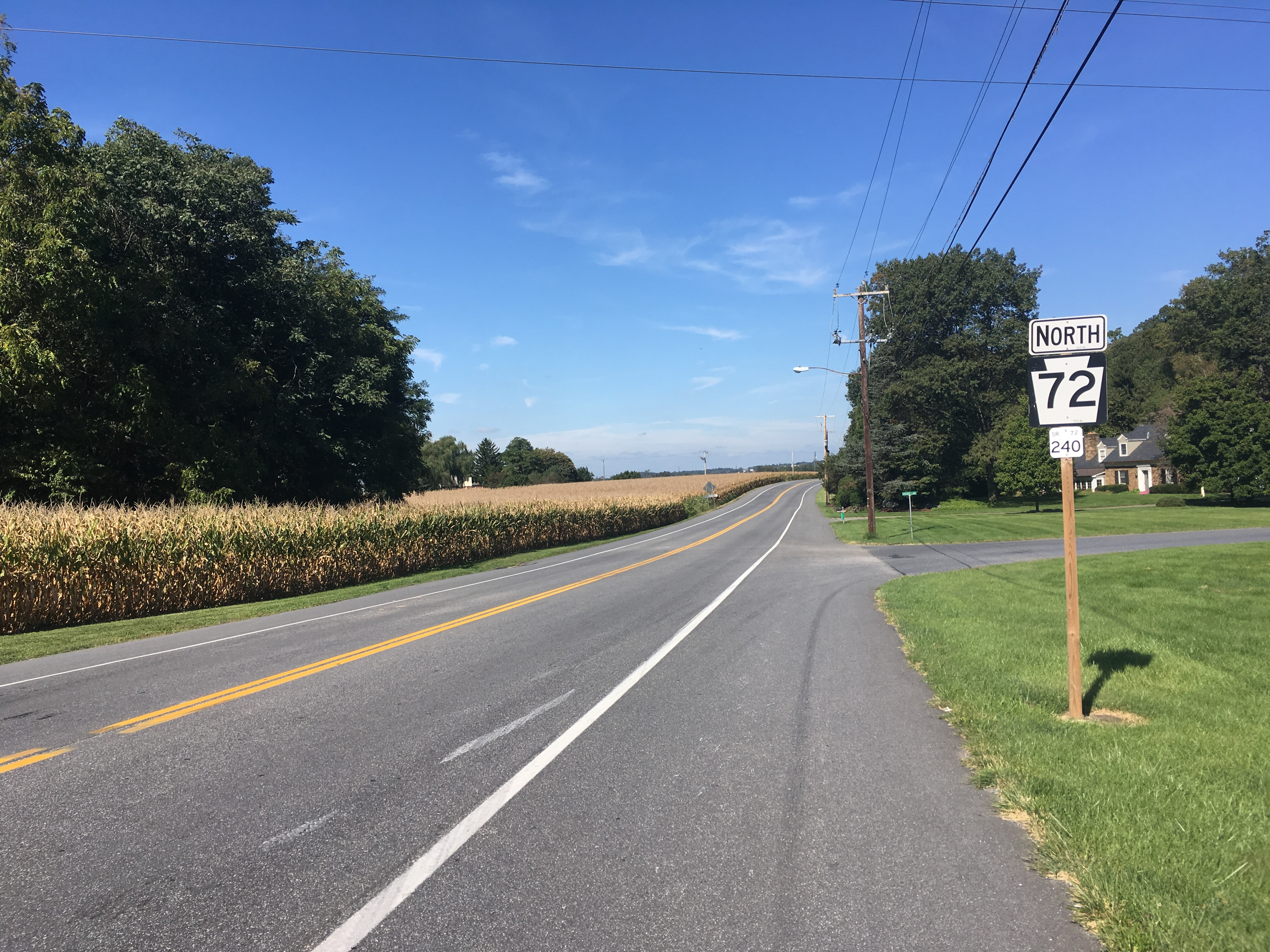
PA 72 northbound in East Hempfield Township

The route leaves East Petersburg for East Hempfield Township and becomes Lancaster Road, heading past farmland, running to the east of a quarry and turning to the northwest. The road heads through agricultural areas with occasional residential and commercial development and curves north to cross into Penn Township. PA 72 continues through rural areas and passes to the east of the large Manheim Auto Auction facility. The route heads north through a mix of commercial development and fields, curving to the northwest. The road continues past homes and businesses and crosses Chiques Creek into the borough of Manheim, where it runs through commercial areas on South Main Street and intersects PA 772. At this point, PA 772 becomes concurrent with PA 72 on South Main Street and the road crosses Norfolk Southern's Lititz Secondary railroad line at-grade before it becomes lined with homes. In the commercial downtown of Manheim, PA 772 splits southwest at Market Square and PA 72 continues along North Main Street through residential areas. The route curves north and leaves Manheim for Rapho Township, where it becomes Lebanon Road and heads through a mix of farmland, trees, and homes, turning northwest. The road curves north and crosses Chiques Creek into Penn Township, where it reaches the community of Elstonville and turns west. PA 72 heads across the creek back into Rapho Township and winds northwest through a mix of farmland and woodland with a few homes. The route runs north and passes to the west of Mount Hope Estate, which is the site of the Pennsylvania Renaissance Faire, before it comes to a bridge over the Pennsylvania Turnpike (I-76). A short distance later, the road reaches a ramp that provides access to the Pennsylvania Turnpike at the Lebanon-Lancaster interchange, with a park and ride lot opposite the ramp to the east of the road. Past this interchange, PA 72 heads north through forested areas with commercial development as it traverses South Mountain as a three-lane road with two northbound lanes and one southbound lane.

=== Lebanon County ===
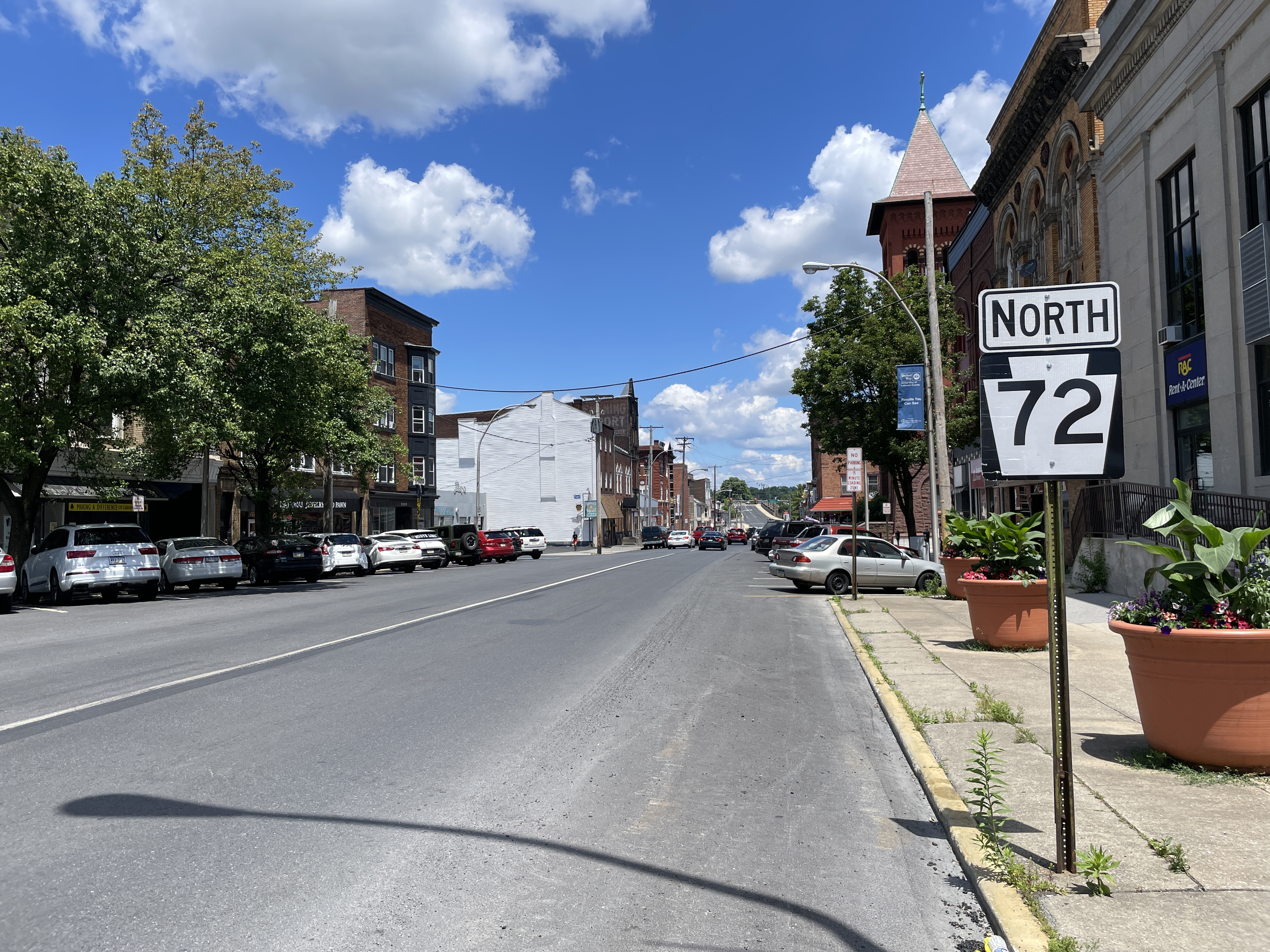
PA 72 northbound past US 422 westbound in Lebanon

PA 72 enters Lebanon County, where it becomes the border between West Cornwall Township and the borough of Cornwall to the east. The route narrows to two lanes and continues through forests before it curves northeast to fully enter Cornwall and come to an interchange with the US 322 freeway bypass of Cornwall. At this point, PA 72 merges onto westbound US 322 and the two routes head north-northwest along a four-lane freeway, reaching an interchange with the southern terminus of PA 117. The road passes over the Lebanon Valley Rail Trail at this interchange. Past this, the freeway crosses into West Cornwall Township and PA 72 splits from US 322 at a partial interchange, heading north onto two-lane undivided Quentin Road into the Lebanon Valley. The route passes fields before coming to an intersection with PA 419 in a commercial area east of the community of Quentin. The road continues northeast through a mix of farmland, woods, and homes, passing to the east of a golf course as it again forms the border between West Cornwall Township to the south and the borough of Cornwall to the east. PA 72 heads north into North Cornwall Township and runs through agricultural areas before it passes near a couple shopping centers. The route heads into residential areas with some commercial development and enters the city of Lebanon, where the roadway becomes city-maintained.

A short distance after entering Lebanon, the road intersects the northern terminus of PA 241. PA 72 continues past businesses before it splits into a one-way pair, with the northbound direction following South 9th Street and the southbound direction following South 10th Street, both carrying two lanes of one-way traffic. The route continues through commercial areas and crosses the Lebanon Valley Rail Trail. PA 72 heads through urban residential areas before it enters the downtown area of Lebanon, where it intersects the eastbound direction of US 422 at Walnut Street and the westbound direction of US 422 at Cumberland Street. At the intersection with the latter, the name changes to North 9th Street northbound and North 10th Street southbound. North of here, the route crosses the Quittapahilla Creek and heads into industrial areas, where both directions come to bridges over Norfolk Southern's Harrisburg Line and Scull Street. PA 72 continues through urban areas of homes before it reaches an intersection with the southern terminus of PA 343 at Maple Street. At this point, both directions of PA 72 head west along Maple Street, a two-way, two-lane undivided road that runs through commercial areas before entering woods.

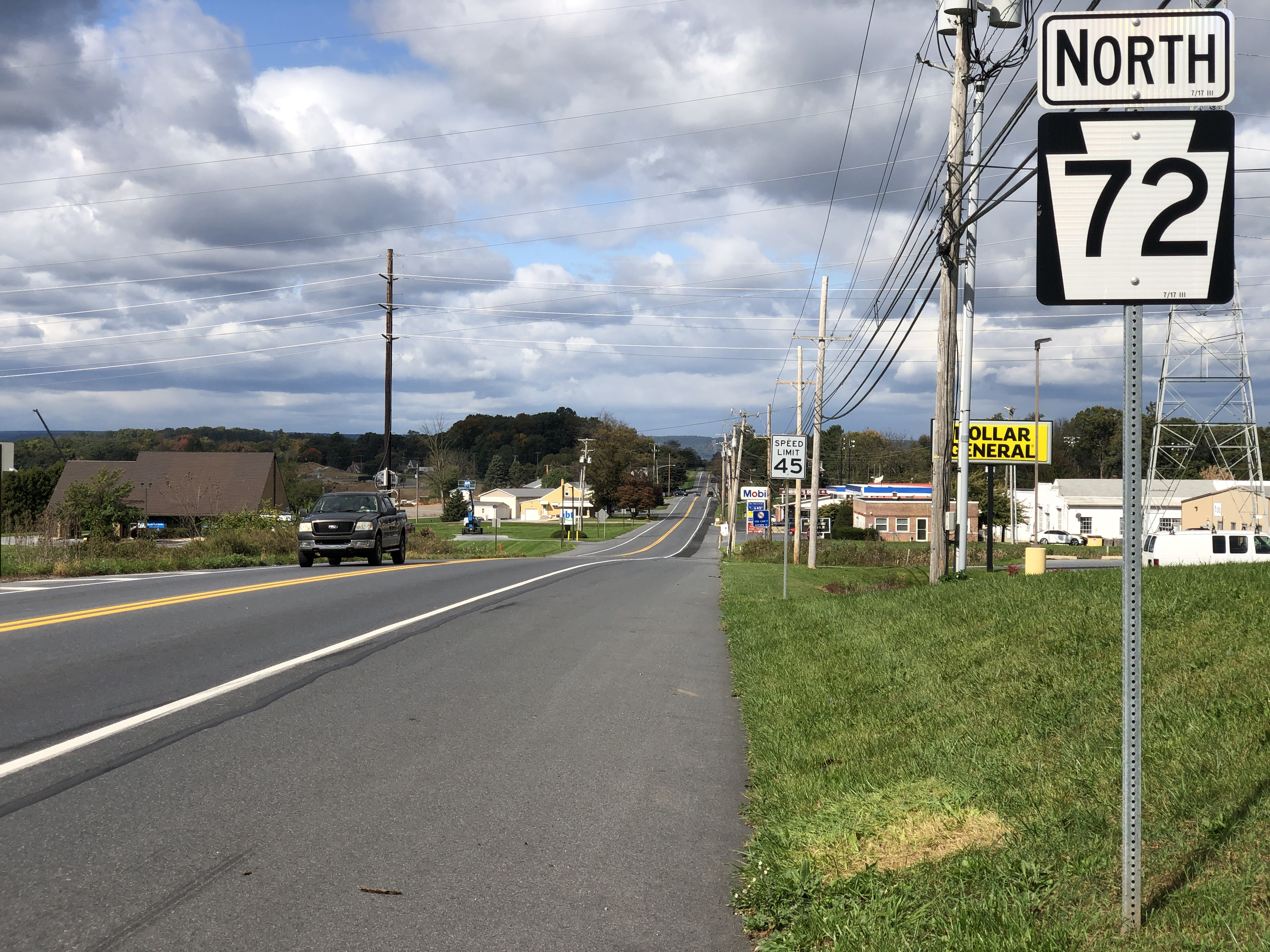
PA 72 northbound in North Lebanon Township

The route leaves Lebanon for North Lebanon Township, where it becomes state-maintained again and the name becomes Ebenezer Road. The road passes through the community of Coheva, where it is briefly a divided highway, and curves northwest as an undivided road through a mix of farmland and development, heading through Ebenezer and passing to the west of Ebenezer Lake. PA 72 continues through areas of farms and woods with some homes and businesses as an unnamed road, entering Swatara Township and bending northwest to pass through the residential community of Bunker Hill. The route crosses the Swatara Creek into Union Township and runs north past rural areas of residential and commercial development in the community of West Jonestown, where it crosses Jonestown Road. The road widens to a four-lane divided highway as it reaches a cloverleaf interchange with US 22. Past this interchange, PA 72 continues as a four-lane undivided road through developed areas before it comes to a bridge over I-78 without an interchange. The route narrows to a two-lane undivided road and runs through a mix of farms and trees with some homes. Farther north, the road reaches the community of Lickdale, where it passes businesses and homes and intersects Fisher Avenue, which heads west to a partial cloverleaf interchange with I-81 and Fort Indiantown Gap. PA 72 runs past more commercial development before it runs through fields and trees with some homes, with I-81 parallel to the west and the Swatara Rail Trail and the Swatara Creek parallel to the east. The route passes through forested Swatara Gap in Blue Mountain, where it turns northwest closely parallel to the trail and the creek and crosses under I-81 before heading across the Appalachian Trail. PA 72 curves west away from the Swatara Rail Trail and the Swatara Creek through forested areas within Swatara State Park to reach its northern terminus at an intersection with PA 443 near the community of Green Point, where the roadway curves north and continues as part of that route.

== History ==
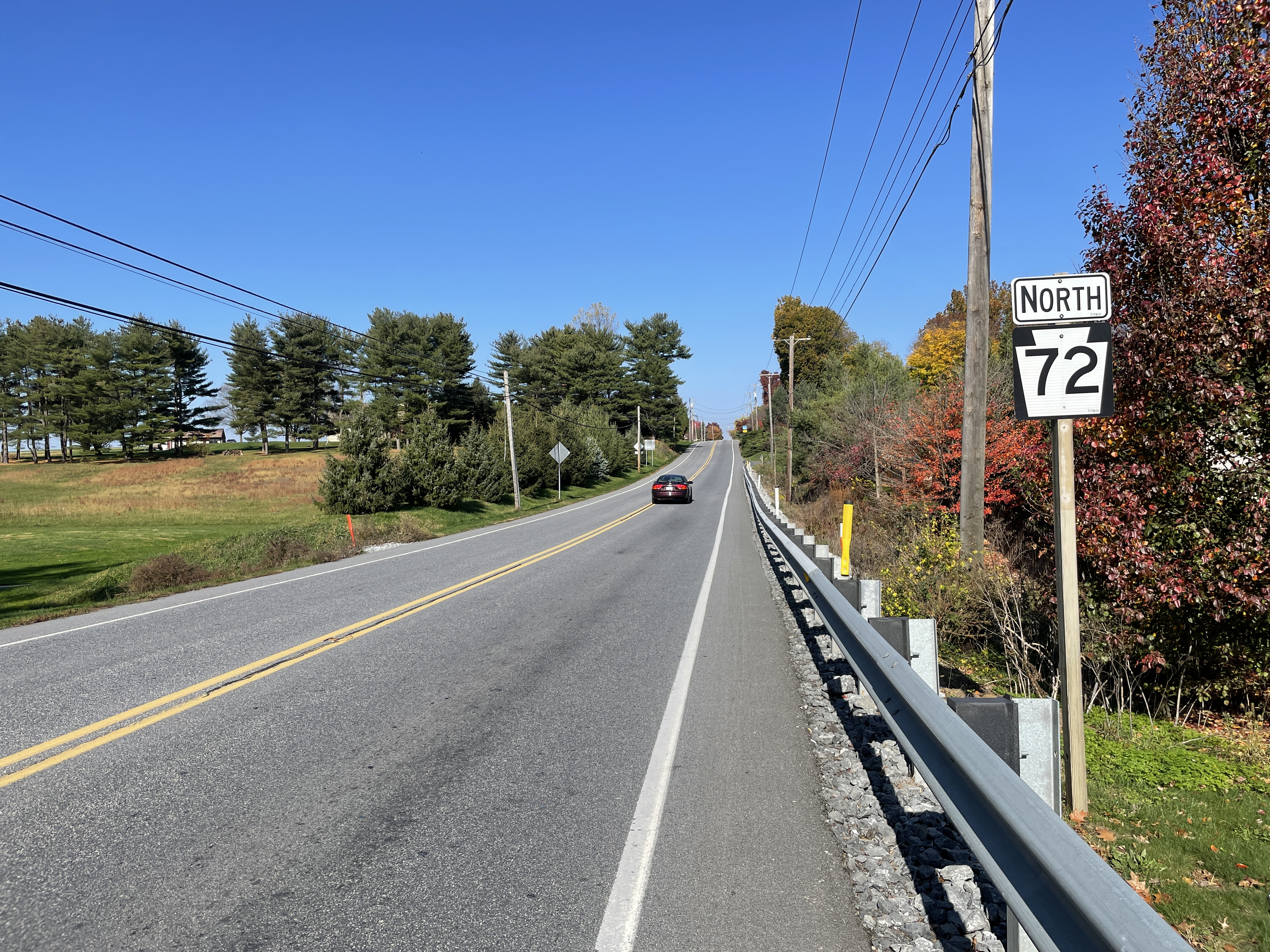
PA 72 northbound in Rapho Township

The portion of the route between Lancaster and Manheim was chartered on May 9, 1850 as the Manheim, Petersburg, and Lancaster Turnpike, a private turnpike running from Prussia Street in Manheim south to Petersburg (now East Petersburg) and Lancaster. This turnpike was built as a plank road. The Manheim and Lebanon Plank and Turnpike Road was chartered on April 12, 1851 to build a plank road turnpike between Manheim and Lebanon.

When Pennsylvania first legislated routes following the passage of the Sproul Road Bill in 1911, Legislative Route 138 was designated between Lancaster and Cornwall while a portion of Legislative Route 137 was designated between Cornwall and Lebanon. A portion of Legislative Route 141 was designated from Lebanon north to Lickdale; the route bended to the west between Jonestown and Lickdale. The portion of road between Lickdale and Green Point became a part of Legislative Route 140. With the creation of the U.S. Highway System in 1926, the road heading south from Lancaster was designated as part of US 230. PA 72 was designated in 1927 to run from the Maryland state line north to Lancaster, running concurrent with US 230. In 1928, PA 72 was extended north from Lancaster to PA 343 north of Jonestown; also, US 222 replaced the US 230 designation that was concurrent with the route between the Maryland state line and Lancaster. PA 72 followed US 222 from the Maryland state line north through Quarryville to Lancaster, where it continued north along its current alignment to Quentin. Here, it turned east along PA 5 (later US 322, now PA 419) to Cornwall and then north along Cornwall Road to Lebanon. PA 72 continued through Lebanon and headed north, passing through Jonestown along Lancaster Street and continuing north to PA 343 at Mowery Road. By 1930, the southern terminus of PA 72 was cut back to US 230 at the intersection of Prince Street and Harrisburg Avenue in Lancaster, eliminating the concurrency with US 222 south of Lancaster. At this time, all of PA 72 was paved except for the portion north of Jonestown.

PA 72 was extended south from Lancaster to US 222 in Wakefield in the 1930s, following US 222 along Prince Street in Lancaster and between Lancaster and Willow Street before continuing south on a straight alignment through Buck to Wakefield. Also, the route was realigned to head north to PA 443 near Green Point, following its current alignment between south of Jonestown and PA 343. By 1940, a separate section of PA 72 was designated in Luzerne County, running from US 11 in Larksville east to US 309 at Washington Street in Wilkes-Barre along Bridge Street, Carey Avenue, Academy Street, River Street, and South Street. The section of PA 72 in Luzerne County was decommissioned in the 1940s.

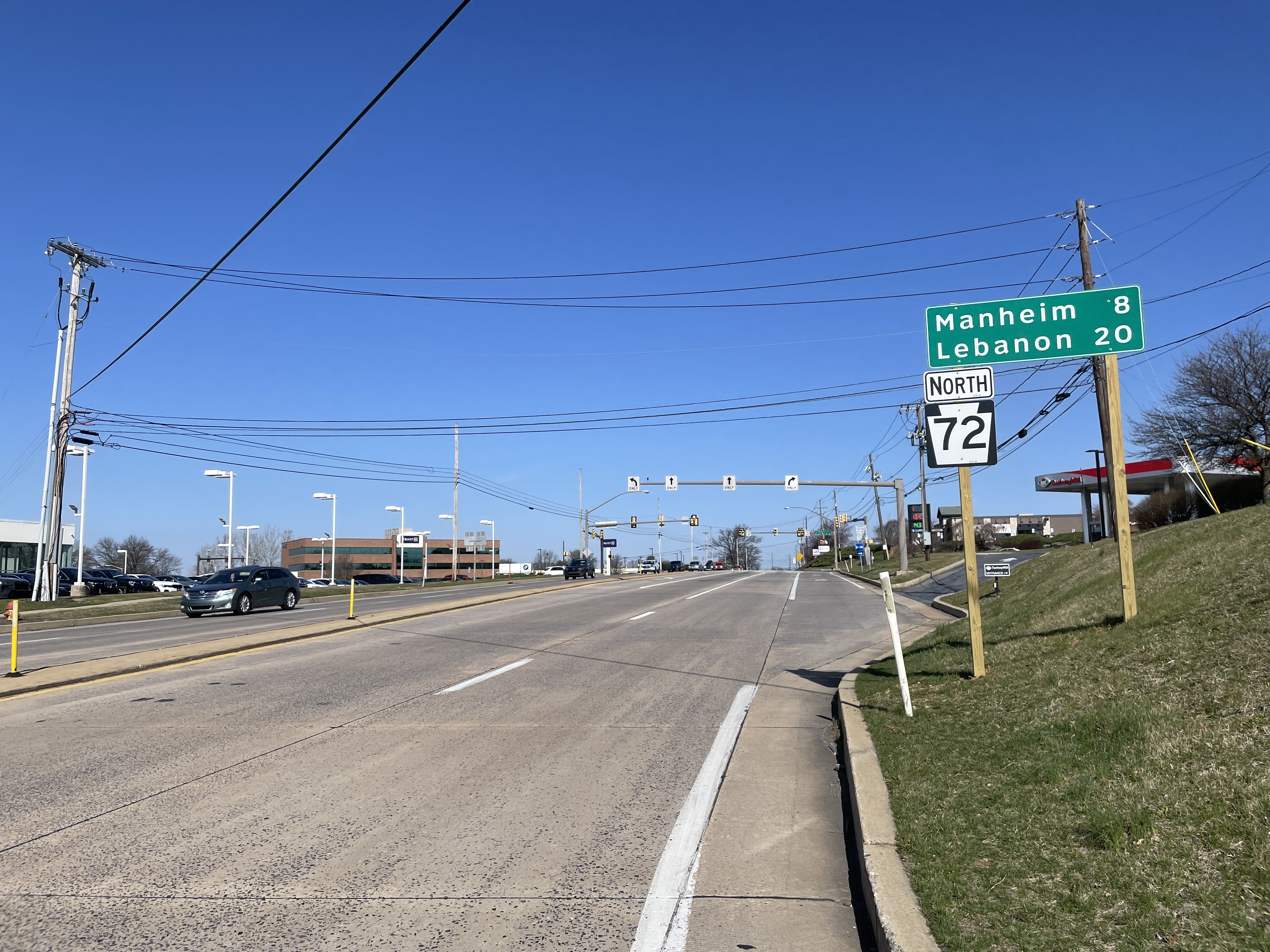
PA 72 northbound past PA 283 in Manheim Township

In the 1950s, PA 72 was shifted to its current alignment between Quentin and Lebanon. PA 72 was split into a one-way pair in Lancaster in the 1950s, with the northbound direction following Queen Street and the southbound direction following Prince Street. Northbound PA 72 ran concurrent with northbound US 222 on Queen Street up to Church Street, where US 222 split northeast on that street before continuing north on Lime Street, while southbound PA 72 ran concurrent with southbound US 222 on Prince Street through the length of the city. Also, the route was split into its current one-way pair in downtown Lebanon, with both directions having previously followed 9th Street. In 1963, PA 72 was rerouted to a bypass to the west of Cornwall, running concurrent with US 322. By 1969, the northern terminus of PA 72 was rerouted at Lickdale to head west along Fisher Avenue and Clement Avenue to PA 443 and PA 934 on the grounds of the Edward Martin Military Reservation (now Fort Indiantown Gap).

In the 1960s, the southern terminus of PA 72 was cut back to its current location in Lancaster, with an extended PA 272 replacing the route between Wakefield and Willow Street. The northern endpoint of the route was cut back to an interchange with I-81 in Lickdale in the 1970s. By 1997, PA 72 was rerouted north from Lickdale to its present northern terminus at PA 443. In 2011, a $20.2 million project began to replace the at-grade crossing with the Norfolk Southern tracks in Lebanon with bridges over the tracks in order to eliminate traffic congestion that resulted from the frequent train traffic crossing the road. Construction on the northbound bridge started in fall 2011 and was finished in September 2012. Construction on the southbound bridge followed, with completion in 2013.

== Major intersections ==
County	Location	mi	km	Destinations	Notes
Lancaster	Lancaster	0.000	0.000	US 222 north (South Queen Street / Church Street)	Southern terminus of PA 72 northbound
Lancaster	Lancaster	0.319	0.513	PA 462 east (King Street)	
Lancaster	Lancaster	0.540	0.869	PA 23 east (East Chestnut Street)	Northbound only
Lancaster	Lancaster	0.652	1.049	PA 23 west / PA 462 west (Walnut Street)	Northbound only
Lancaster	Lancaster–Manheim Township line	1.414	2.276	US 222 south (McGovern Avenue)	Northbound only; southern end of US 222 south concurrency
Lancaster	Lancaster–Manheim Township line	1.499	2.412	US 222 south (North Prince Street) – Downtown Lancaster	Northern end of US 222 south concurrency; southern terminus of PA 72 southbound
Lancaster	Manheim Township	3.075	4.949	US 30 west – York	Interchange; access to US 30 west and from US 30 east
Lancaster	Manheim Township	3.730	6.003	PA 283 to US 30 east – Harrisburg, Philadelphia	Interchange
Lancaster	East Petersburg	5.651	9.094	PA 722 (State Street) – Landisville, Neffsville	
Lancaster	Manheim	10.510	16.914	PA 772 east (Fruitville Pike)	Southern end of PA 772 concurrency
Lancaster	Manheim	10.978	17.667	PA 772 west (Market Square)	Northern end of PA 772 concurrency
Lancaster	Rapho Township	16.695	26.868	Penna Turnpike	Exit 266 (Lebanon–Lancaster) on Penna Turnpike; E-ZPass or toll-by-plate
Lebanon	Cornwall	18.511	29.791	US 322 east – Ephrata	Interchange; southern end of US 322 concurrency
Lebanon	Cornwall	19.067	30.685	PA 117 north – Mount Gretna	Interchange; southern terminus of PA 117
Lebanon	West Cornwall Township	19.243	30.969	US 322 west – Harrisburg, Hershey	Interchange; northbound exit to US 322 west and southbound entrance from US 322 east; northern end of US 322 concurrency
Lebanon	West Cornwall Township	19.947	32.102	PA 419 (Main Street) to US 322 west – Quentin, Hershey, Cornwall	
Lebanon	Lebanon	23.488	37.800	PA 241 south (Colebrook Road)	Northern terminus of PA 241
Lebanon	Lebanon	24.188	38.927	US 422 east (Walnut Street)	
Lebanon	Lebanon	24.388	39.249	US 422 west (Cumberland Street)	
Lebanon	Lebanon	25.088	40.375	PA 343 north (Maple Street)	Southern terminus of PA 343
Lebanon	Union Township	31.790	51.161	US 22 to I-78 – Harrisburg, Allentown	Interchange
Lebanon	Union Township	34.271	55.154	I-81 – Harrisburg, Hazleton	Access via Fisher Avenue; exit 90 on I-81
Lebanon	Union Township	37.757	60.764	PA 443 west – Fort Indiantown Gap	
Lebanon	Union Township	37.757	60.764	PA 443 east	Continuation north
1.000 mi = 1.609 km; 1.000 km = 0.621 mi: Concurrency terminus; Electronic toll collection; Incomplete access
