= Pennsylvania Route 343 =

State highway in Lebanon County, Pennsylvania, US

Pennsylvania Route 343

Route information
- Maintained by PennDOT and City of Lebanon
- Length: 8.159 mi (13.131 km)
- Existed: 1928–present

Major junctions
- South end: PA 72 in Lebanon
- US 22 in Fredericksburg
- North end: I-78 in Fredericksburg

Location
- Country: United States
- State: Pennsylvania
- Counties: Lebanon

Highway system
- Pennsylvania State Route System; Interstate; US; State; Scenic; Legislative
← PA 342	→ PA 344

Pennsylvania Route 343 (PA 343) is an 8.16-mile (13.13 km) route running from Lebanon north to Fredericksburg in Lebanon County, Pennsylvania. It begins at PA 72 and ends at Exit 6 of Interstate 78 (I-78). PA 343 heads mostly through urbanized areas near Lebanon before continuing into rural areas further north. There is a concurrency with U.S. Route 22 (US 22) near the northern terminus.

PA 343 has had a number of different realignments, most of them relating to the northern terminus of the highway. The highway originally terminated at an intersection with PA 443 in Lickdale, moved to end in the community of Bordnersville soon after. The highway was then extended along the local continuation to end at US 22 in Harper Tavern. In 1963, PA 343 was moved back to Lickdale, and seven years after, moved to its northern terminus, thirteen years after the construction of I-78.

== Route description ==
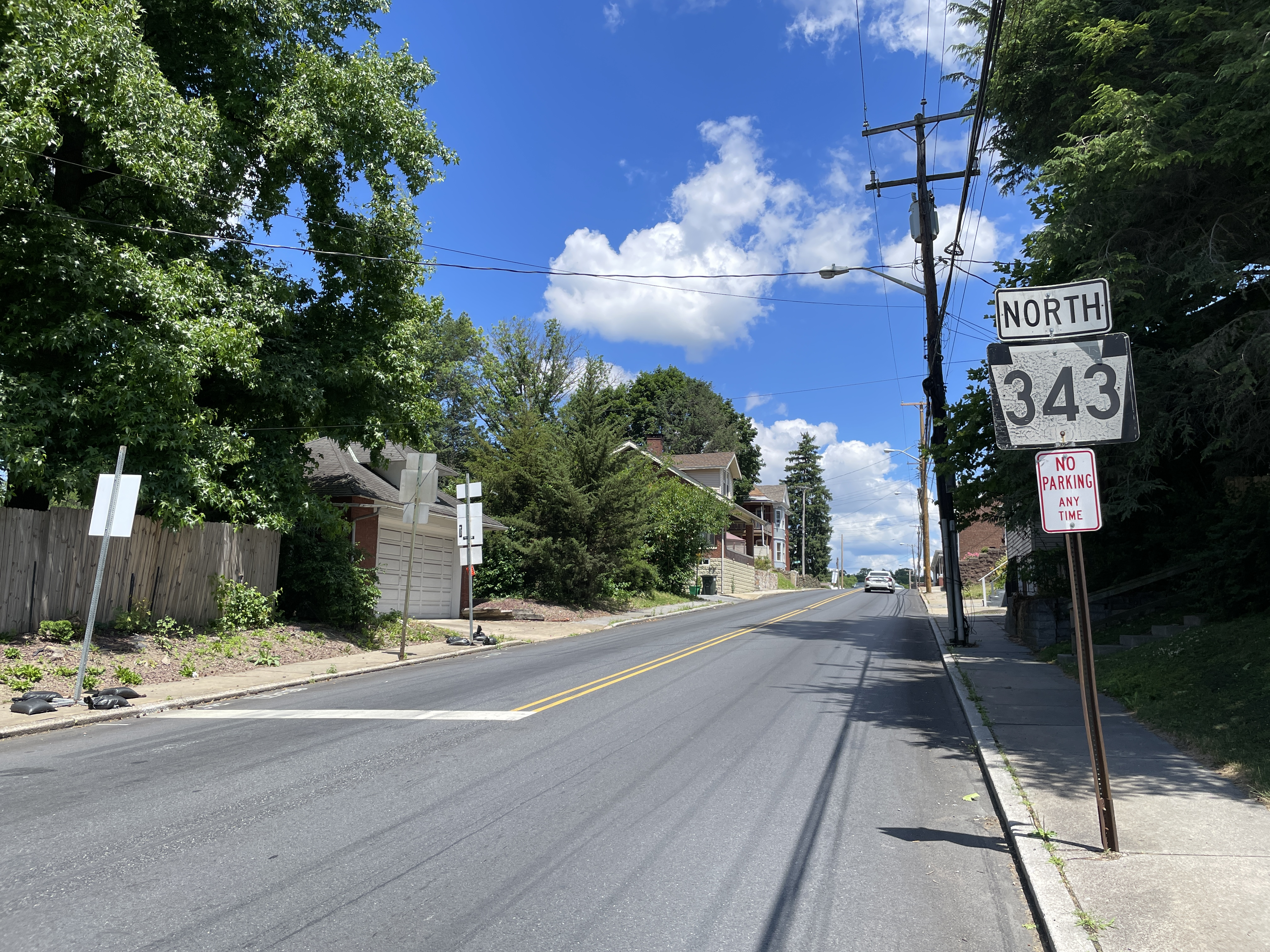
PA 343 northbound past Maple Street in Lebanon

PA 343 begins at an intersection with PA 72 in the city of Lebanon in Lebanon County. PA 343 heads eastward along Maple Street, a two-lane undivided street maintained by the city, past urbanized homes and businesses. The route turns north onto North 7th Street and passes more development. PA 343 leaves Lebanon for North Lebanon Township, where it becomes state-maintained and passes through the residential community of Reindeldville. The road runs north-northeast past more homes and businesses as it heads through the community of Eustontown. The route leaves the urbanized areas and heads into agricultural areas with some trees and homes. PA 343 turns northwest at the Heffelfinger Road intersection and enters Bethel Township, where it heads northward to South Pine Grove Street through a patch of woods before running through more farmland. The road runs to the west of Little Swatara Creek and passes to the east of Pine Meadows Golf Course before it crosses the creek. The route continues through rural areas and passes through the residential community of Shirksville. PA 343 heads north through more farmland before it comes to an intersection with US 22 (William Penn Highway) south of the community of Fredericksburg.

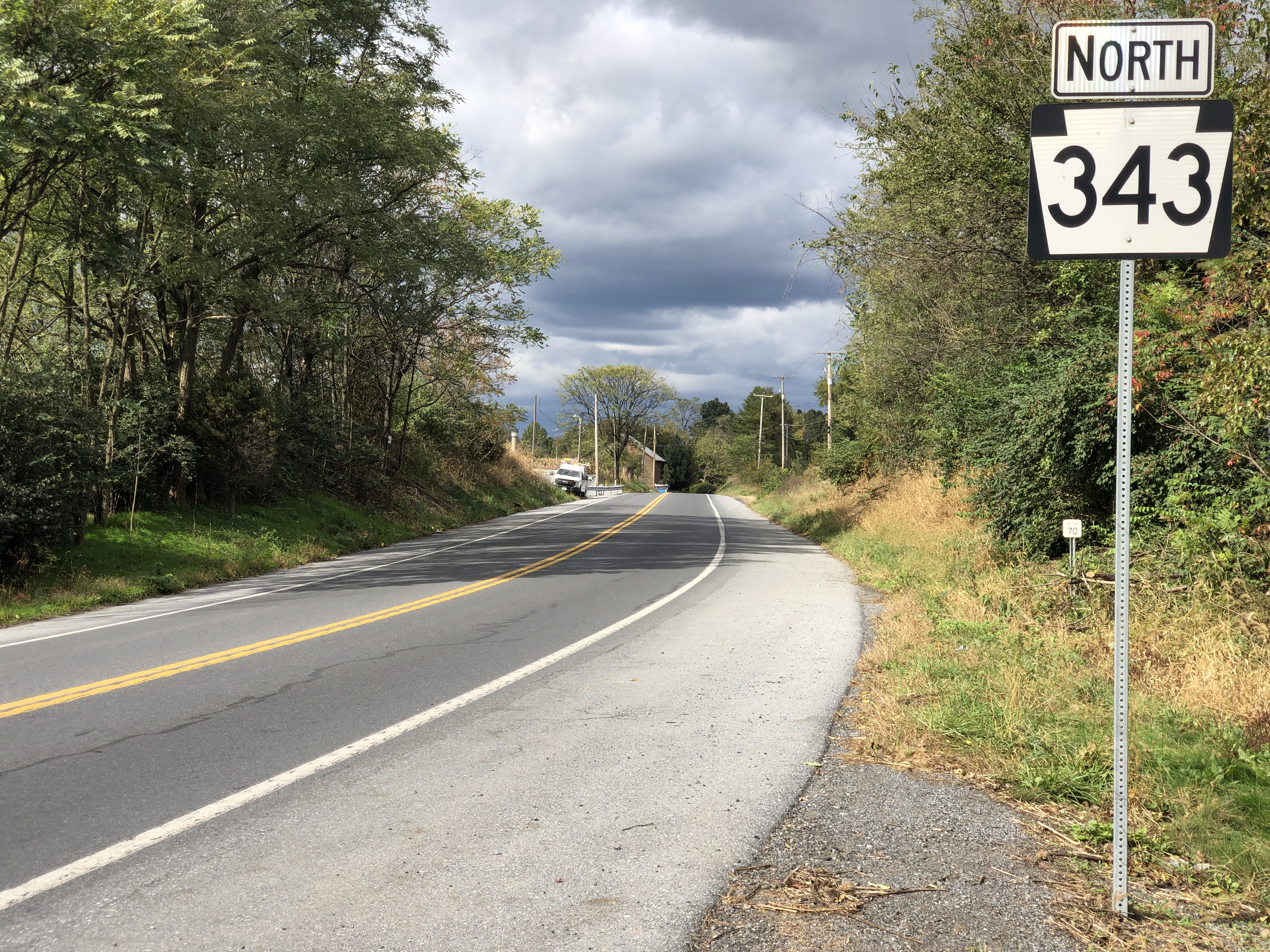
PA 343 northbound in Swatara Township

At this point, South Pine Grove Street continues to Fredericksburg and PA 343 turns northeast to become concurrent with US 22 on four-lane divided William Penn Highway. The road runs through agricultural areas with some commercial development, passing to the south of a warehouse. PA 343 splits from US 22 by heading north on two-lane undivided Pine Grove Road, passing to the west of a park. The route continues near rural commercial development before it reaches its northern terminus at a partial interchange with I-78, with access to westbound I-78 and access from eastbound I-78. Past this interchange, Pine Grove Road continues north as SR 1007 toward the Berks County line.

== History ==
PA 343 was assigned in the numbering of state routes in Pennsylvania during 1928. The highway then ran from the southern terminus in Lebanon, which was at the time, an intersection with US 22 (now US 422). At Fredericksburg, the route reached an intersection with PA 43 (now US 22). At Fredericksburg, highway turned to the northwest and headed to Lickdale. There it terminated at an intersection with PA 443. The highway stayed intact for two years, until 1930, when the highway was extended a few miles to the community of Bordnersville, where the road then continued as a local highway.

The highway was paved from Fredericksburg to an intersection with Lancaster Street and from Lickdale to Bordnersville in 1932. In 1936, the Pennsylvania Department of Highways extended PA 343 past Bordnersville and Lickdale, along the local road. This changed the northern terminus to an intersection with US 22 (formerly the alignment of PA 43) in Harper Tavern. This alignment remained intact for more than two decades. In 1963, even with the construction of I-78 six years prior, PA 343 was realigned once again by the Department of Highways. This time, the northern terminus was cut back to the PA 72 intersection in Lickdale, with an extended PA 934 replacing the route between Harper Tavern and Lickdale. This change was made to provide the same route number on both sides of the I-81 interchange north of Harper Tavern. The highway remained intact for another seven years, and in 1970, PA 343 was realigned for the final time, this time onto its current alignment. The northern terminus is now at a partial interchange with I-78.

== Major intersections ==
The entire route is in Lebanon County.

Location	mi	km	Destinations	Notes
Lebanon	0.000	0.000	PA 72 (9th Street / Maple Street)	Southern terminus
Bethel Township	6.820	10.976	US 22 west (William Penn Highway)	South end of US 22 concurrency
Bethel Township	7.641	12.297	US 22 east (William Penn Highway) to I-78 east	North end of US 22 concurrency
Bethel Township	8.159	13.131	I-78 west – Harrisburg	Northern terminus; access to I-78 west and from I-78 east; exit 6 on I-78
1.000 mi = 1.609 km; 1.000 km = 0.621 mi: Concurrency terminus; Incomplete access
