= Pennsylvania Route 934 =

State highway in Lebanon County, Pennsylvania, US

Pennsylvania Route 934

Route information
- Maintained by PennDOT
- Length: 10.873 mi (17.498 km)

Major junctions
- South end: US 322 / PA 241 in South Annville Township
- US 422 in Annville; US 22 in East Hanover Township
- North end: I-81 in Fort Indiantown Gap

Location
- Country: United States
- State: Pennsylvania
- Counties: Lebanon

Highway system
- Pennsylvania State Route System; Interstate; US; State; Scenic; Legislative
← PA 933	→ PA 935

Pennsylvania Route 934 (PA 934) is a 10.9-mile-long (17.5 km) state route located in Lebanon County, Pennsylvania. The southern terminus is at a junction with U.S. Route 322 (US 322)/PA 241 in the South Annville Township hamlet of Fontana. Its northern terminus is at Interstate 81 (I-81) at the southern edge of the Fort Indiantown Gap Military Reservation. The route passes through rural areas along with the community of Annville in between. Along its routing, PA 934 intersects US 422 in Annville and US 22 in the East Hanover Township hamlet of Harper Tavern.

PA 934 was first designated in 1928 to run from US 22 (now US 422) in Annville north to Bellegrove. By 1946, the southern terminus was extended to US 322/PA 241 while the northern terminus was extended to US 22 and PA 343. The northern terminus was extended to PA 72 in Lickdale in 1963 and realigned to PA 72 and PA 443 within the Edward Martin Military Reservation in the late 1960s. In the 1970s, the north end of PA 934 was moved to its current location at I-81.

== Route description ==
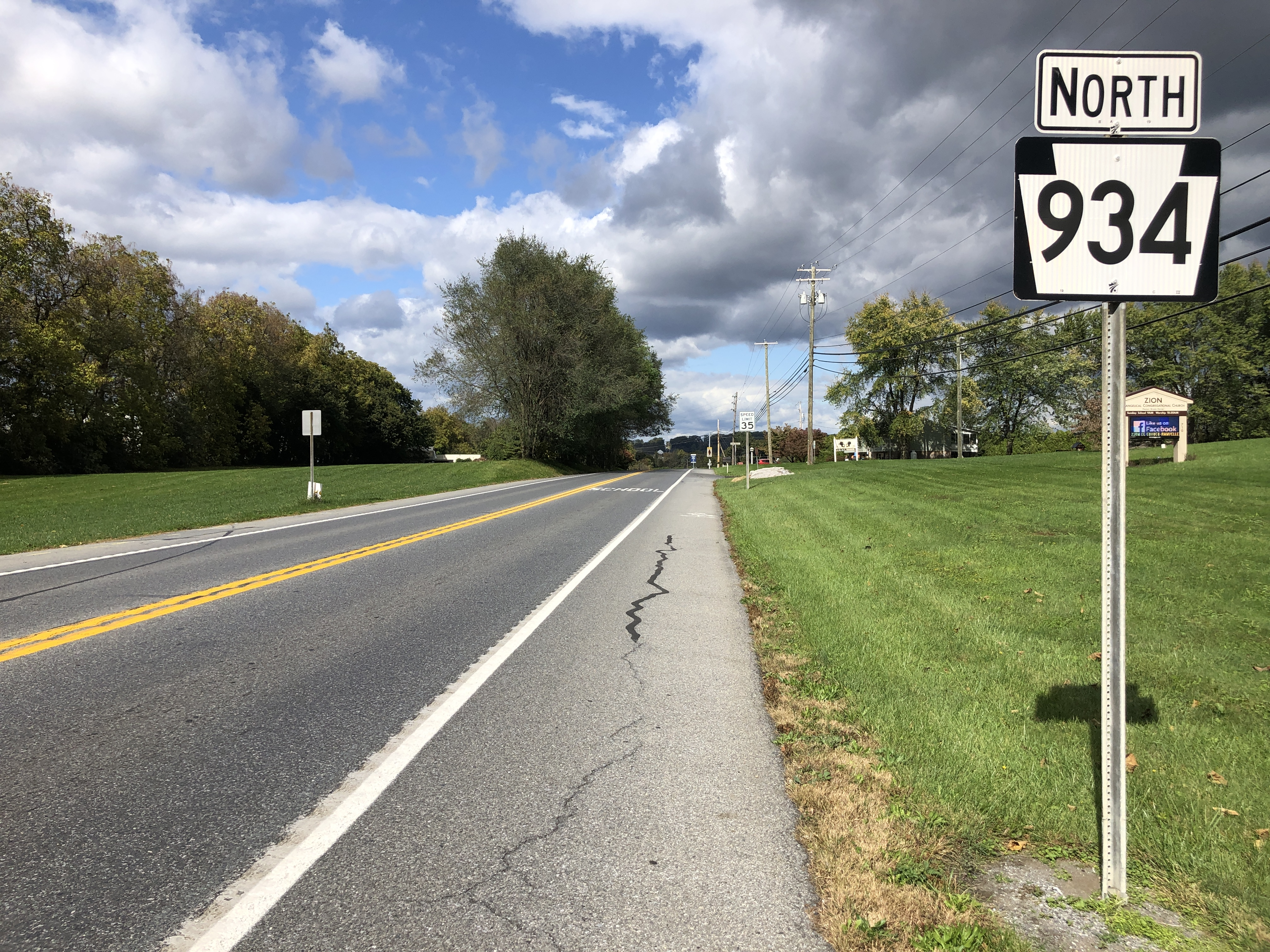
PA 934 northbound in South Annville Township

PA 934 begins at an intersection with US 322/PA 241 in South Annville Township, Lebanon County. From this intersection, the route heads north-northwest on two-lane undivided White Oak Street, passing through open agricultural areas with a few homes. Farther north, the roadway passes west of Annville-Cleona Middle/High School. The road crosses the Quittapahilla Creek into Annville Township, where it passes homes in the community of Annville as it comes to the US 422 intersection. Following this intersection, PA 934 passes by the Lebanon Valley College campus and comes to a bridge over Norfolk Southern's Harrisburg Line. The route enters North Annville Township and becomes Bellegrove Road as it heads into areas of farms, woods, and homes, making a turn to the west prior to heading to the north. PA 934 passes through the community of Bellegrove as it turns to the northwest and crosses into East Hanover Township before reaching a bridge over the Swatara Creek. After the creek, the route intersects Jonestown Road in Harper Tavern and reaches an interchange with US 22, at which point the road widens to four lanes and becomes Fisher Avenue. Following this interchange, PA 934 becomes a divided highway and passes east of a park and ride lot as it heads north to its terminus at the I-81 interchange, with Fisher Avenue continuing north as State Route 4020, an unsigned quadrant route, onto the grounds of Fort Indiantown Gap.

== History ==
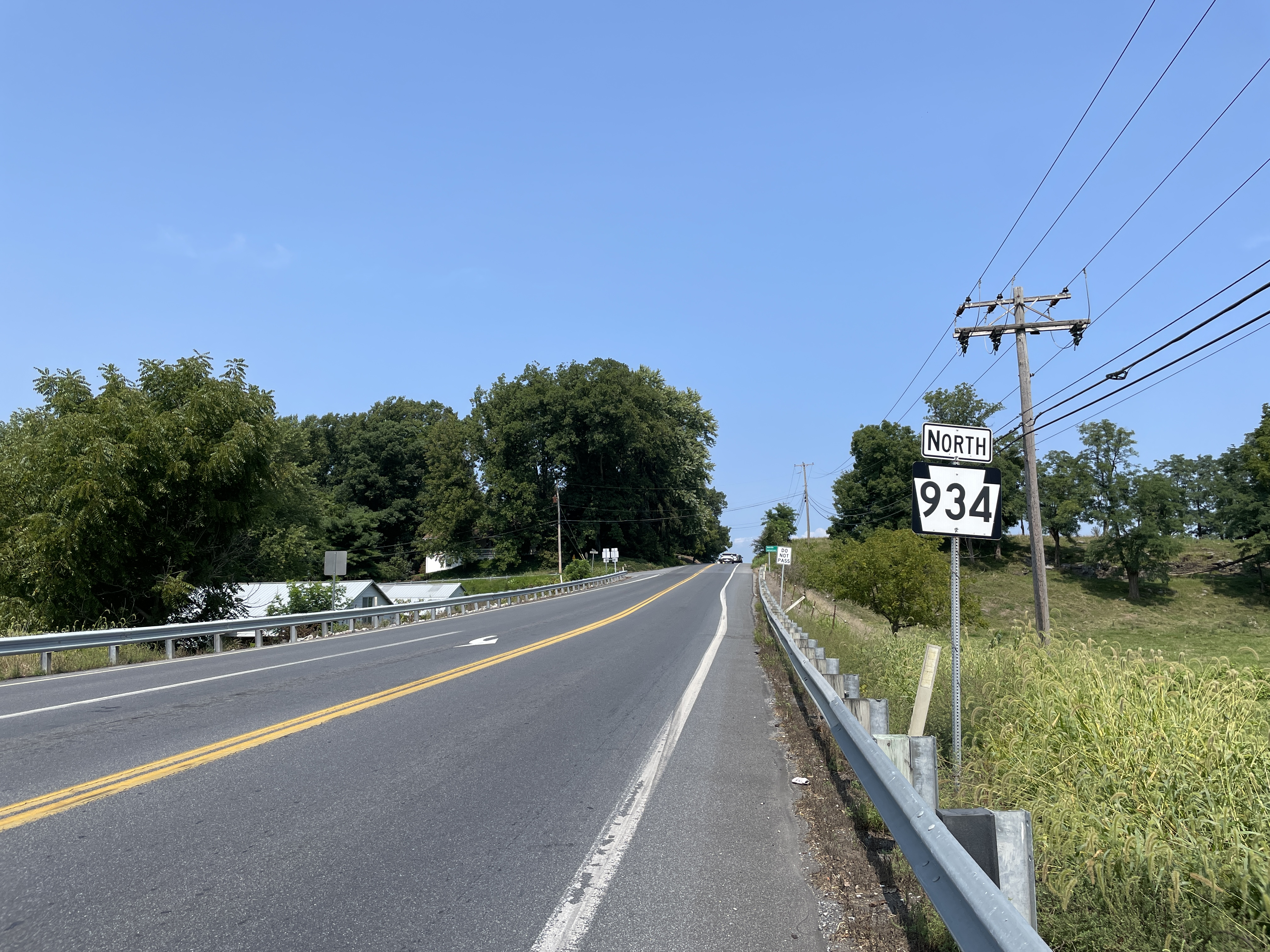
PA 934 northbound past US 322/PA 241 in South Annville Township

When Pennsylvania first legislated routes in 1911, what is now PA 934 was not given a route number. PA 934 was first designated in 1928 to run from US 22 (now US 422) in Annville north to Bellegrove, where an unnumbered paved road continued north to PA 43 (Jonestown Road) in Harper Tavern. At this time, the southern half of PA 934 was paved while the northern half was under construction. By 1946, PA 934 was extended south from Annville to its current southern terminus at US 322/PA 241 while it was extended north from Bellegrove to an interchange with US 22 north of Harper Tavern, where the road continued north as PA 343. PA 934 was extended north from US 22 to an intersection with PA 72 in Lickdale in 1963, replacing a section of PA 343. This change was made to provide the same route number on both sides of the I-81 interchange north of Harper Tavern. The route was realigned to head north and intersect PA 72 and PA 443 within the Pennsylvania National Guard's Edward Martin Military Reservation in the late 1960s, following Fisher Avenue and Asher Miner Road. In the 1970s, the northern terminus of PA 934 was cut back to its current location at the I-81 interchange.

== Major intersections ==
The entire route is in Lebanon County.

Location	mi	km	Destinations	Notes
South Annville Township	0.000	0.000	US 322 / PA 241 (Horseshoe Pike) – Cornwall, Hershey, Harrisburg	Southern terminus
Annville Township	3.485	5.609	US 422 (Main Street) – Hershey, Lebanon	
East Hanover Township	10.355	16.665	US 22 (Allentown Boulevard) – Harrisburg, Allentown	Interchange
East Hanover Township	10.873	17.498	I-81 – Harrisburg, Hazleton, Allentown	Northern terminus; exit 85A on I-81
1.000 mi = 1.609 km; 1.000 km = 0.621 mi
