= James Lick =

American businessman and piano builder (1796–1876)

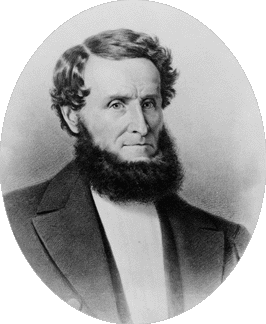
- Born: August 25, 1796; Stumpstown (Fredericksburg) Pennsylvania, US
- Died: October 1, 1876 (aged 80); San Francisco, California, US

James Lick (August 25, 1796 – October 1, 1876) was an American real estate investor, carpenter, piano builder, land baron, and patron of the sciences. The wealthiest man in California at the time of his death, Lick left the majority of his estate to social and scientific causes.

== Early years ==
James Lick was born to Pennsylvania Dutch parents in Stumpstown (Fredericksburg), Pennsylvania on August 25, 1796. Lick's paternal grandfather, William Lük, was a German immigrant from the Palatinate, and served in the American Revolutionary War. William's son, John, anglicized the family name to Lick.

The son of a carpenter, Lick began learning the craft at an early age. When he was twenty-one, he had a romance with Barbara Snavely, the mother of his only child, John Henry. They never married, and the romance failed. Lick left Stumpstown for Baltimore, Maryland, where he learned the art of piano making. He quickly mastered the skill, and moved to New York City and established his own shop. In 1821 Lick moved to Argentina, after learning that his pianos were being exported to South America.

== South American years ==
Lick found his time in Buenos Aires to be difficult, because of his ignorance of Spanish and the turbulent political situation in the country. Despite this, his business thrived, and in 1825 Lick left Argentina to tour Europe for a year. On his return trip, his ship was captured by the Portuguese, and the passengers and crew were taken to Montevideo as prisoners of war. Lick escaped captivity and returned to Buenos Aires on foot.

In 1832, Lick returned to Stumpstown. He failed to reunite with Barbara Snavely and their son, and returned to Buenos Aires. He decided the political situation was too unstable and moved to Valparaíso, Chile. After four years, he again moved his business, this time to Lima, Peru.

In 1846, Lick returned to North America. Anticipating the Mexican–American War and the future annexation of California, he decided to settle there. A backlog of orders for his pianos delayed him 18 months, as his Mexican workers returned to their homes to join the Mexican Army. He finished the orders himself.

== California years ==
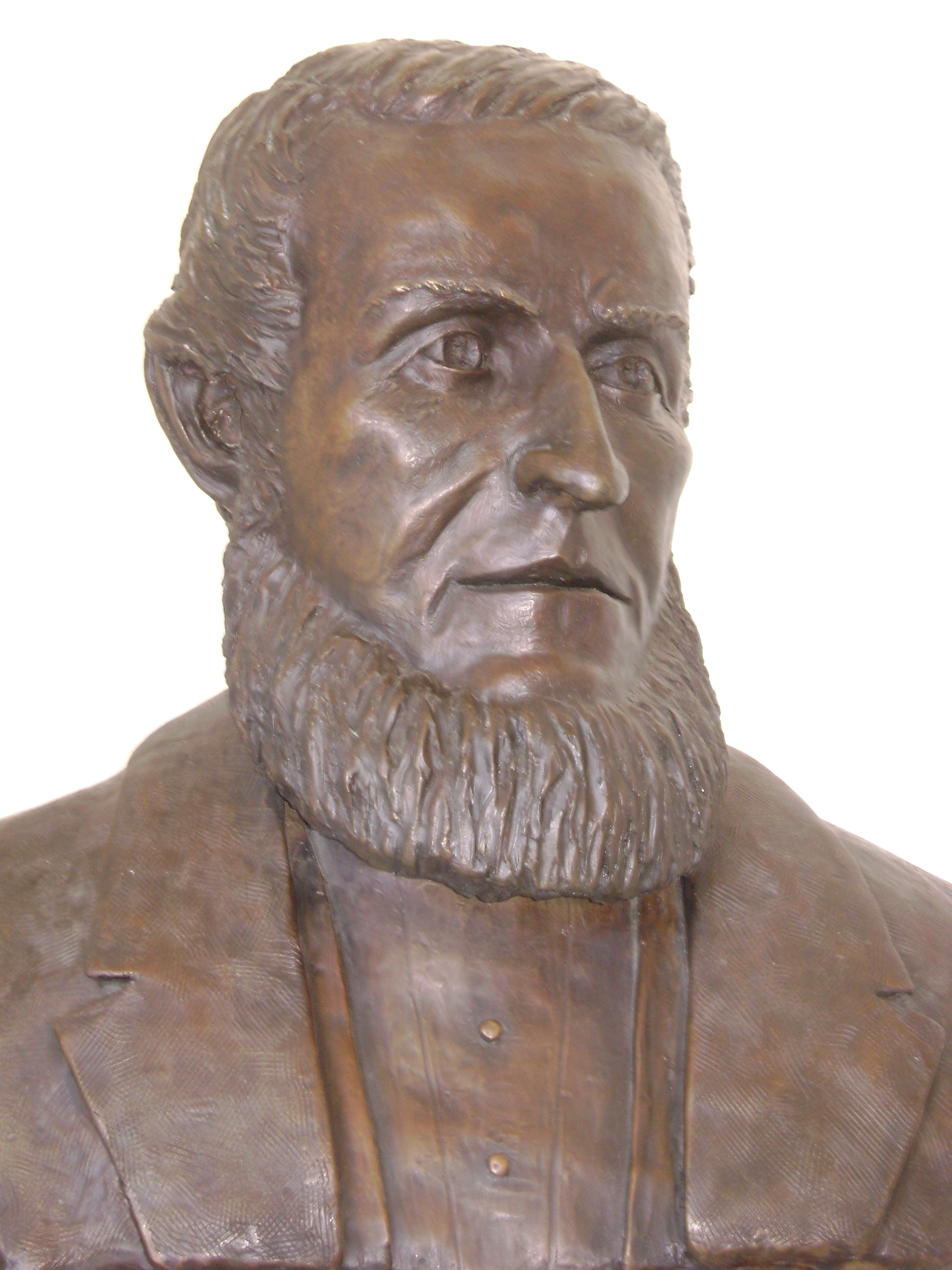
James Lick's bust at the Lick Observatory

Lick arrived in San Francisco, California, in January 1848, bringing with him his tools, work bench, $30,000 in gold (as of 2026, this amount of gold is worth over $8 million), and 600 pounds (275 kilograms) of chocolate. The chocolate quickly sold, so Lick sent back word convincing his friend and neighbor in Peru, the confectioner Domingo Ghirardelli, to move to San Francisco, where he founded the Ghirardelli Chocolate Company.

Upon his arrival, Lick began buying real estate in the small village of San Francisco. The discovery of gold at Sutter's Mill near Sacramento a few days after Lick's arrival in the future state began the California Gold Rush and created a housing boom in San Francisco, which grew from about one thousand residents in 1848 to over twenty thousand by 1850. Lick got a touch of "gold fever" and sought to mine the metal, but after a week decided his fortune was to be made by owning land, not digging in it. Lick continued buying land in San Francisco, and also began buying farmland in and around San Jose, where he planted orchards and built the largest flour mill in the state. He invited his son to join him there in 1854; however, the younger Lick suffered from poor health and returned to Pennsylvania in 1863.

In 1861, Lick began construction of a hotel, known as Lick House, 41 Montgomery Street (Lick Street, 111 Sutter Street), at the intersection with Sutter Street, in San Francisco. The hotel had a dining room that could seat 400, based on a similar room at the palace of Versailles. Lick House was considered the finest hotel west of the Mississippi River. The hotel was destroyed in the fire following the San Francisco earthquake of 1906. The Hunter-Dulin Building was constructed 1925–1927.

Following the construction, Lick returned to his San Jose orchards. In 1874, Lick suffered a massive stroke in the kitchen of his home in Santa Clara. The following morning, he was found by his employee, Thomas Fraser, and taken to Lick House, where he could be better cared for. At the time of his illness, his estates, outside his considerable area in Santa Clara County and San Francisco, included large holdings around Lake Tahoe, a large ranch in Los Angeles County, and all of Santa Catalina Island, making Lick the richest man in California.

In the next three years, Lick spent his time determining how to dispense his fortune. He originally wanted to build giant statues of himself and his parents, and erect a pyramid larger than the Great Pyramid of Giza in his own honor in downtown San Francisco. Through the efforts of George Davidson, president of the California Academy of Sciences, Lick was persuaded to leave the greatest portion of his fortune to the establishment of a mountaintop observatory, with the largest, most powerful telescope yet built.

In 1874, he placed $3,000,000 ($65,200,000 relative value in 2017) at the disposal of seven trustees, by whom the funds were to be applied to specific uses. He replaced the board in 1875 with Faxon Atherton, John Nightingale, Bernard D. Murphy and his son, John H. Lick.

The principal divisions of the funds were:

- $700,000 to the University of California for the construction of an observatory and the installation of a telescope more powerful than any other
- $150,000 for the building and maintenance of free public James Lick Baths in San Francisco
- $540,000 to found and endow an institution of San Francisco to be known as the California School of Mechanic Arts
- $100,000 for the erection of three appropriate groups of bronze statuary to represent three periods in Californian history and to be placed before the city hall of San Francisco
- $60,000 to erect in Golden Gate Park, San Francisco, a memorial to Francis Scott Key, author of "The Star-Spangled Banner"

Lick had had an interest in astronomy since at least 1860, when he and George Madeira, the founder of the first observatory in California, spent several nights observing. They had also met again in 1873 and Lick said that Madeira's telescopes were the only ones he had ever used. In 1875, Thomas Fraser recommended a site at the summit of Mount Hamilton, near San Jose. Lick approved, on the condition that Santa Clara County build a "first-class" road to the site. The county agreed and the road was completed by the fall of 1876.

On October 1, 1876, Lick died in his room in Lick House, San Francisco. In 1887, his body was moved to its final resting place, under the future home of the Great Lick Refracting Telescope.

== Legacy ==
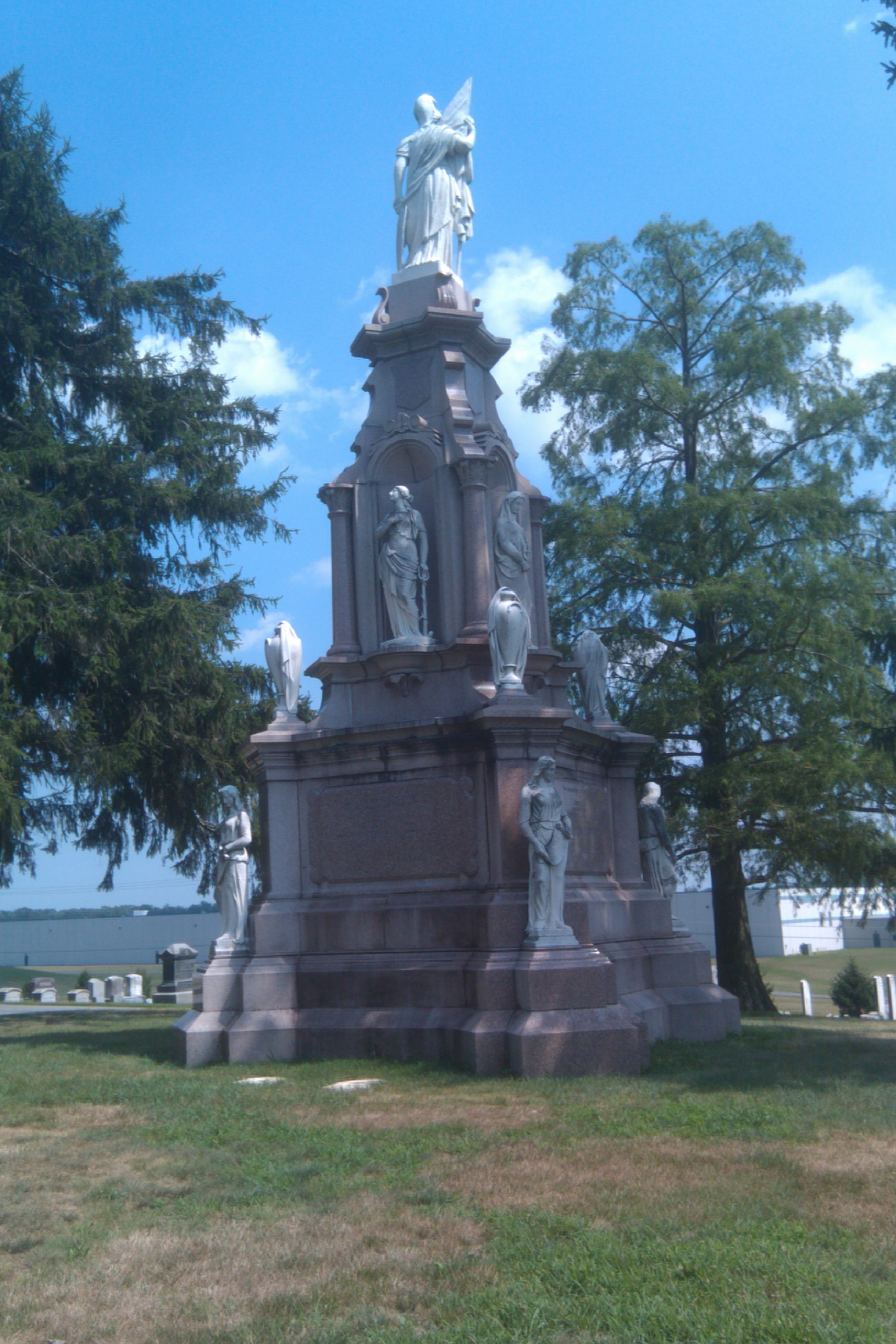
One of three monuments dedicated to the Lick family in Fredericksburg

- Lick's will stipulated that all of his fortune should be used for the public good, including $700,000 for the building of the observatory.
- In 1888, Lick Observatory was completed and given to the University of California as the Lick Astronomical Department. The Observatory was the first permanently staffed mountain top observatory in the world and housed the largest refracting telescope in the world at that time.
- In 1887 Lick's body was buried under the future site of the telescope, with a brass tablet bearing the inscription "Here lies the body of James Lick." His will stipulates that fresh flowers be on his grave – always.
- James Lick Mansion in Santa Clara is a nationally registered historical landmark, and is leased at very low rates to non-profit organizations. As of 2003 the mansion was occupied by the S.A.F.E. Place.
- In 1884, the Lick Old Ladies' Home, later renamed the University Mound Ladies Home, was established in San Francisco with a grant from the Lick estate.
- The Conservatory of Flowers and the statue of Francis Scott Key in Golden Gate Park were donated to San Francisco by Lick.
- The Pioneer Monument in front of San Francisco's City Hall was donated to the city by Lick.
- James Lick High School in San Jose and James Lick Middle School, Lick-Wilmerding High School, and the James Lick Freeway, all in San Francisco, are named in his honor.
- The Southern Pacific Railroad named a Control Point after Lick (CP Lick) on their Coast Line route in San Jose, California. At the same location there was also a Lick Station and Lick Branch rail line that went into San Jose's Almaden Valley, which were abandoned in the early 1980s.
- The crater Lick on the Moon and the asteroid 1951 Lick are named after him.
- Lickdale, Pennsylvania, a village approximately 3 miles west of Fredericksburg, Pennsylvania (formerly Stumpstown), was named for James Lick. Lickdale was a prominent 19th century canal port along a branch of the Union Canal and contained a large commercial ice house.
- A large monument to James Lick was erected by the local citizens in the community cemetery in Fredericksburg, Pennsylvania.
- Lick is commemorated in the scientific name of a species of lizard, Sceloporus licki, which is endemic to Baja California Sur.
- To this day, James Lick has family members living in Fredericksburg, Pennsylvania and Jonestown, Pennsylvania. A family reunion is held yearly to honor his family.
