= James Lick Baths =

San Francisco historic landmark

Coordinates: 37.7746°N 122.4148°W

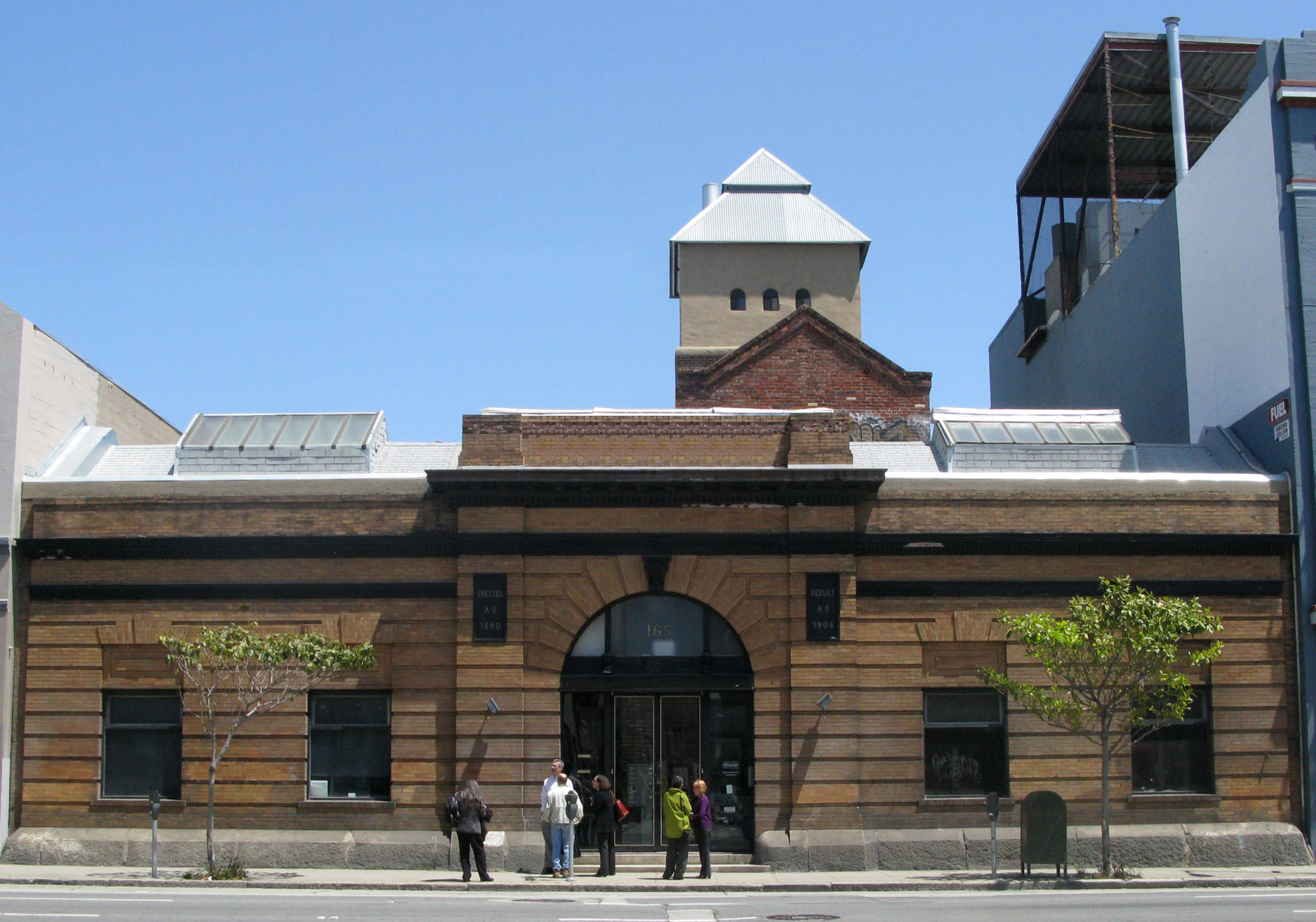
In 2008.

The James Lick Baths (also known as the People's Laundry Building and 165 Tenth Street) in the South of Market District of San Francisco, California, is a San Francisco Designated Landmark combining aspects of public bathing and self-service laundry.

== History ==
In 1890 working class residents of San Francisco did not have indoor plumbing. Built in 1890 by the James Lick estate as a free public bath house, it housed a men's bath with forty bathtubs in changing rooms in the large north wing, and a women's bath with twenty tubs in changing rooms in the smaller south wing. The James Lick Baths were originally lavish in conception and finish. Water was pumped from the facility's own wells, heated in boilers in the sunken boiler room, and hot and cold water was pumped into 10,000 US gal (38,000 L; 8,300 imp gal) tanks in the tower. Bathers could open the taps at each tub in the bathing halls for a customized mix of hot and cold water.

After extensive damage in the 1906 earthquake and fire, the building was repaired and continued as a bath until 1919.

From 1919 until 1973 it was The People's Laundry, an industrial laundry, followed by a variety of offices, workshops, and stores. The two main bath spaces were divided and circulation in the building became convoluted. A wall at the base of the tower was demolished, leaving one side unsupported.

The building became a San Francisco Designated Landmark in 2004. In 2008 Gelfand Partners Architects acquired the building and renovated the ground floor to be its office.
