= Fredericksburg, Lebanon County, Pennsylvania =

Unincorporated community in Pennsylvania, US

Fredericksburg, Pennsylvania
- Census-designated place
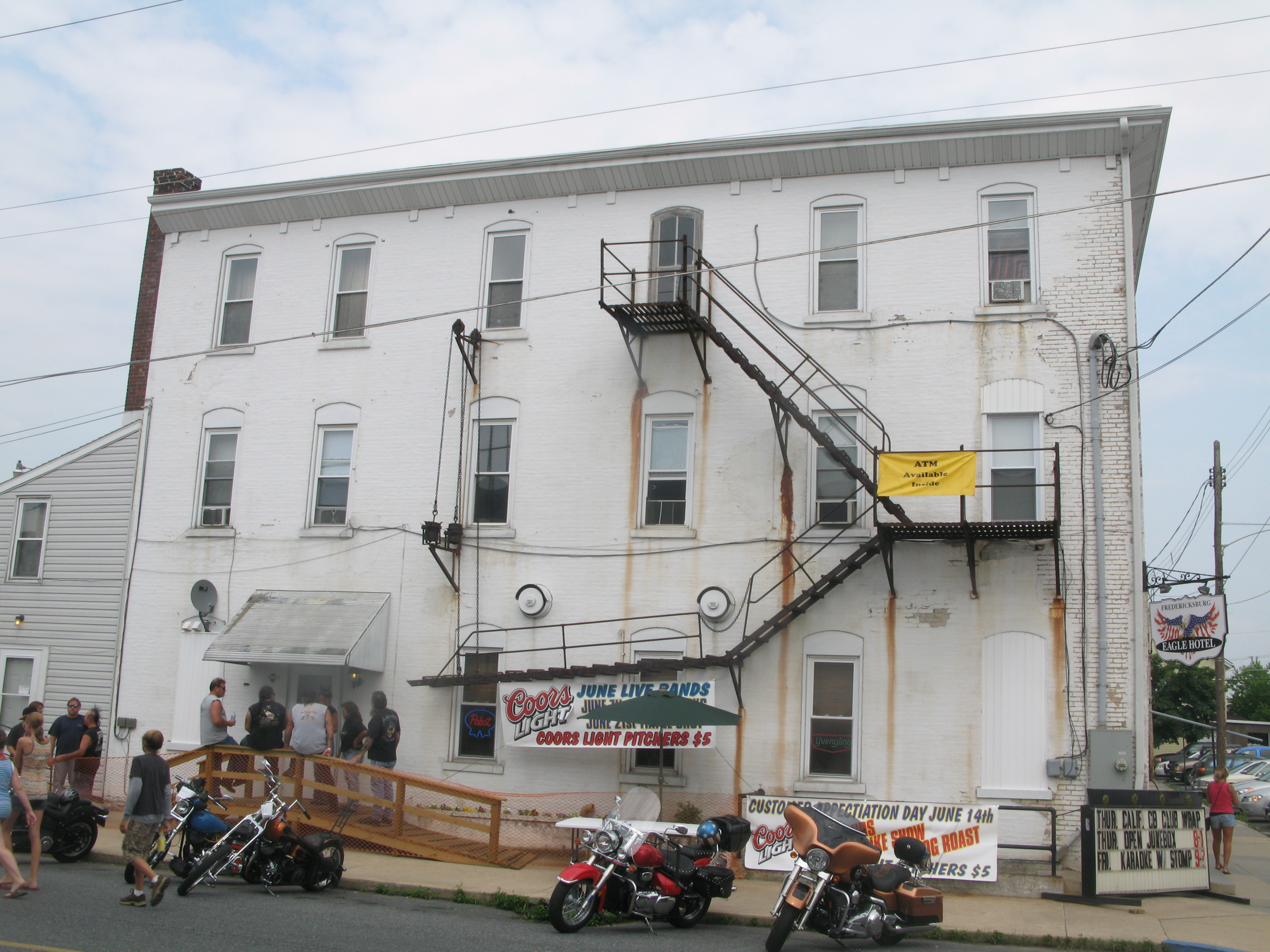
- Eagle Hotel in Fredericksburg, 2008

- Location in Pennsylvania Location in the United States
- Coordinates: 40°26′41″N 76°25′52″W
- Country: United States
- State: Pennsylvania
- County: Lebanon
- Township: Bethel

Area
  - Total: 1.92 sq mi (4.97 km^{2})
  - Land: 1.92 sq mi (4.97 km^{2})
  - Water: 0 sq mi (0.00 km^{2})
- Elevation: 478 ft (146 m)

Population (2020)
  - Total: 1,448
  - Density: 754.8/sq mi (291.43/km^{2})
- Time zone: UTC-5 (EST)
  - Summer (DST): UTC-4 (EDT)
- ZIP code: 17026
- Area code: 717
- FIPS code: 42-27656
- GNIS feature ID: 1175193

Fredericksburg is an unincorporated community and census-designated place (CDP) in Bethel Township, Lebanon County, Pennsylvania, United States. The population was 1,784 at the 2020 census, up from 1,357 at the 2010 census and 987 at the 2000 census.

== History ==
Fredericksburg was originally called "Stumptown" after a disreputable settler named Frederick Stump, who founded the town in 1755, and reportedly massacred an encampment of ten inebriated Indians one winter and sent their bodies down the Susquehanna.

Fredericksburg was the birthplace of James Lick, a pianomaker who moved to San Francisco and invested in real estate just before the Gold Rush. Lick had become the wealthiest man in California by the time of his death, leaving his large fortune to philanthropic causes.

Fredericksburg was the birthplace of Clayton Mark, the prominent steel magnate, in 1858. Mark was the founder of the planned worker community of Marktown, Indiana.

== Geography ==
Fredericksburg is located in northeastern Lebanon County, in the west-central part of Bethel Township. Interstate 78 forms the northern edge of the community, and U.S. Route 22 forms the southern edge. The two highways join just east of the community. I-78 leads east 52 miles (84 km) to Allentown and west 5 miles (8 km) to its terminus at Interstate 81, which continues southwest 22 miles (35 km) to Harrisburg, the state capital. US-22 westbound parallels I-78 and I-81 to Harrisburg, passing just north of Jonestown. Pennsylvania Route 343 leads south from Fredericksburg 8 miles (13 km) to Lebanon, the county seat.

According to the United States Census Bureau, the Fredericksburg CDP has a total area of 1.9 square miles (5.0 km^{2}), all land. The community is drained by Deep Run and Beach Run, which join south of the town to form Elizabeth Run, a tributary of Little Swatara Creek and part of the Susquehanna River watershed.

Farmers Pride Airport is a landing strip in Fredericksburg.

== Demographics ==
Historical population
Census	Pop.	Note	%±
2020	1,448		—
U.S. Decennial Census

As of the census of 2000, there were 987 people, 388 households, and 270 families residing in the CDP. The population density was 501.5 inhabitants per square mile (193.6/km^{2}). There were 407 housing units at an average density of 206.8 per square mile (79.8/km^{2}). The racial makeup of the CDP was 97.26% White, 0.20% African American, 1.72% from other races, and 0.81% from two or more races. Hispanic or Latino people of any race were 2.33% of the population.

There were 388 households, out of which 28.4% had children under the age of 18 living with them, 53.4% were married couples living together, 9.0% had a female householder with no husband present, and 30.4% were non-families. 24.5% of all households were made up of individuals, and 12.6% had someone living alone who was 65 years of age or older. The average household size was 2.54 and the average family size was 2.99.

In the CDP, the population was spread out, with 25.0% under the age of 18, 5.5% from 18 to 24, 31.2% from 25 to 44, 22.3% from 45 to 64, and 16.0% who were 65 years of age or older. The median age was 37 years. For every 100 females, there were 102.3 males. For every 100 females age 18 and over, there were 102.7 males.

The median income for a household in the CDP was $37,438, and the median income for a family was $44,971. Males had a median income of $31,490 versus $22,308 for females. The per capita income for the CDP was $16,321. About 5.6% of families and 9.0% of the population were below the poverty line, including 11.1% of those under age 18 and 20.2% of those age 65 or over.

== Transportation ==
Interstate 78 runs along the northern edge of Fredericksburg, and U.S. Route 22 runs along its southern edge. On February 13, 2016, a passing snow squall helped cause a 50 car accident on I-78, leading to three deaths.
