= Harper Tavern, Pennsylvania =

Unincorporated community in Pennsylvania, US

- Unincorporated community
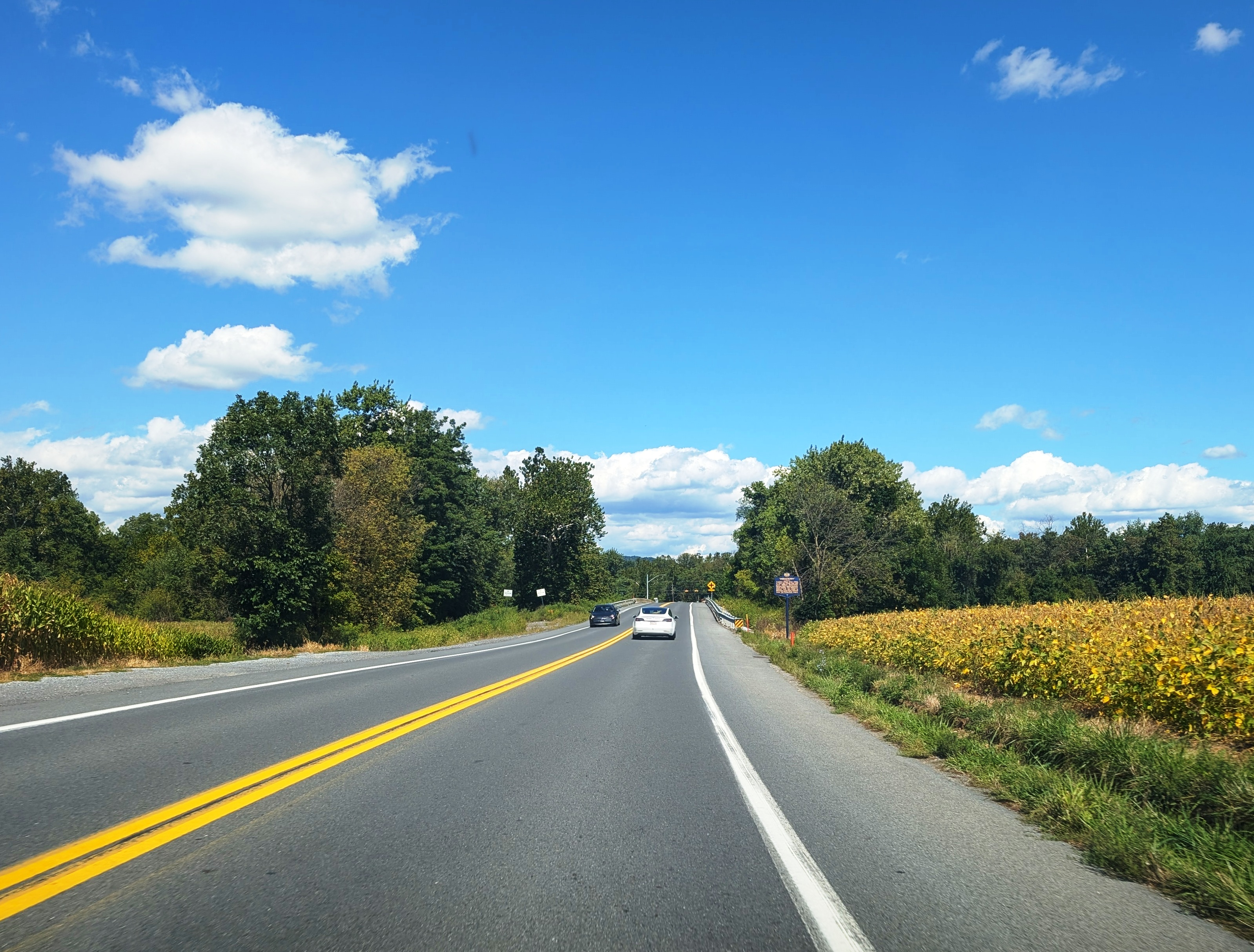
- PA 934 northbound approaching Swatara Creek

- Location within Pennsylvania Location within the United States
- Coordinates: 40°24′14″N 76°34′40″W
- Country: United States
- State: Pennsylvania
- County: Lebanon
- Township: East Hanover
- Incorporated: 1890
- Elevation: 381 ft (116 m)
- Time zone: UTC-5 (Eastern (EST))
  - Summer (DST): UTC-4 (EDT)
- Area code: 717
- GNIS feature ID: 1203753

Harper Tavern is an unincorporated community in East Hanover Township in Lebanon County, Pennsylvania, United States. Harper Tavern is located at the intersection of Pennsylvania Route 934 and Jonestown Road along Swatara Creek.

== Notable people ==
- Drew Massey, a puppeteer for the Jim Henson Company
- Lindley Murray, a Quaker grammarian
