= Lickdale, Pennsylvania =

Unincorporated community in Pennsylvania, U.S.

- Unincorporated community
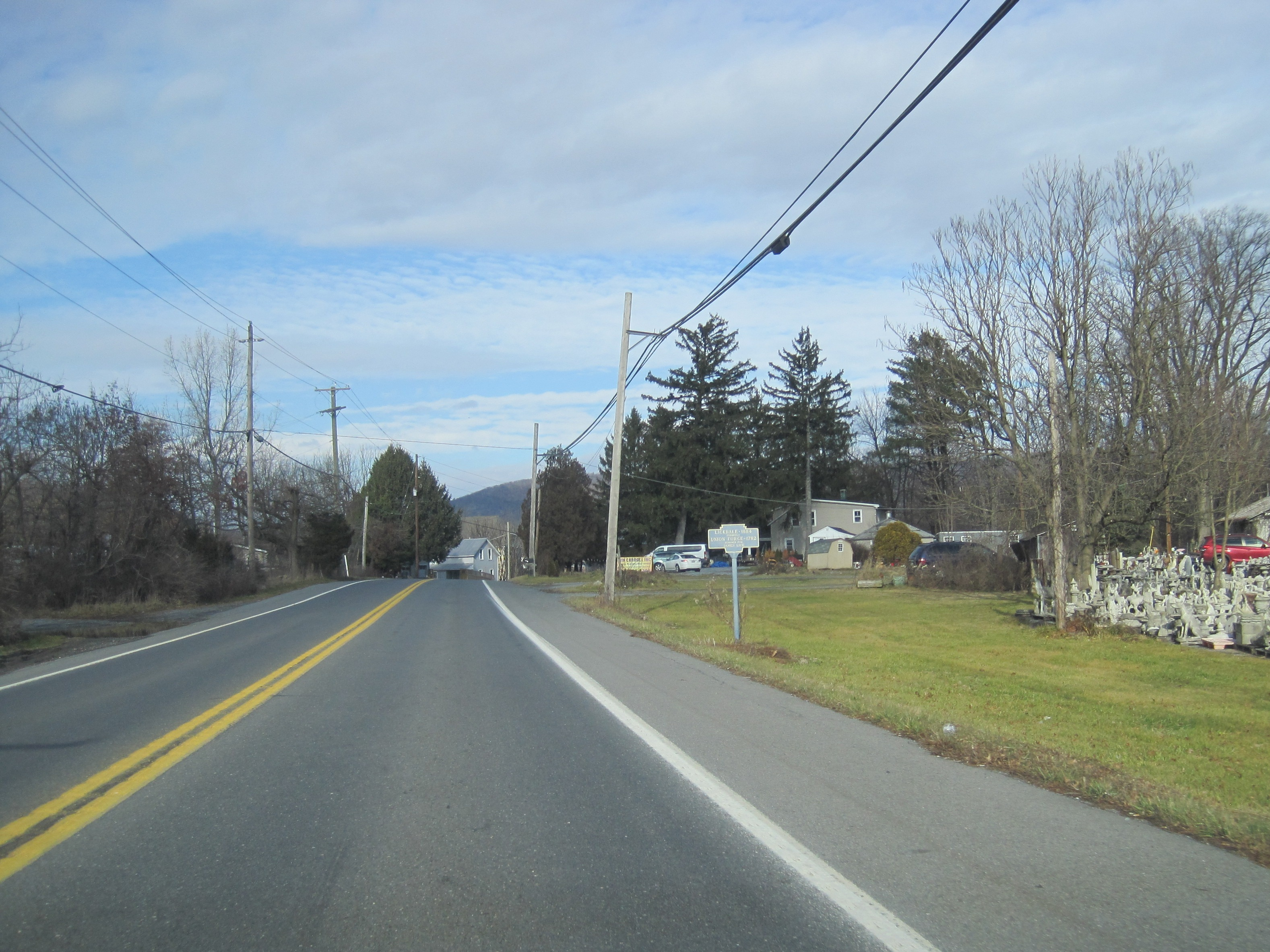
- Entering Lickdale on northbound PA 72

- Location within Pennsylvania Location within the United States
- Country: United States
- State: Pennsylvania
- County: Lebanon
- Townships: Union Township
- Elevation: 427 ft (130 m)
- Time zone: UTC-5 (Eastern (EST))
  - Summer (DST): UTC-4 (EDT)
- Area code: 717
- GNIS feature ID: 1179312

Lickdale, previously known as Union Forge, is an unincorporated community in northern Lebanon County, Pennsylvania, United States. It is a village approximately three miles (4.8 km) west of Fredericksburg, Pennsylvania (formerly Stumpstown), and was named for James Lick. Lickdale was a prominent 19th century canal port along a branch of the Union Canal and contained a large commercial ice house. It is on the Swatara Creek and serves as a southern gateway to Swatara State Park. It is located in Union Township and Route 72 has an interchange with Interstate 81 via Fisher Avenue. It is served by the Jonestown post office with the zip code of 17038.
