= Bethel Township, Lebanon County, Pennsylvania =

Township in Pennsylvania, US

Coordinates: 40°30′01″N 76°30′00″W

- Township
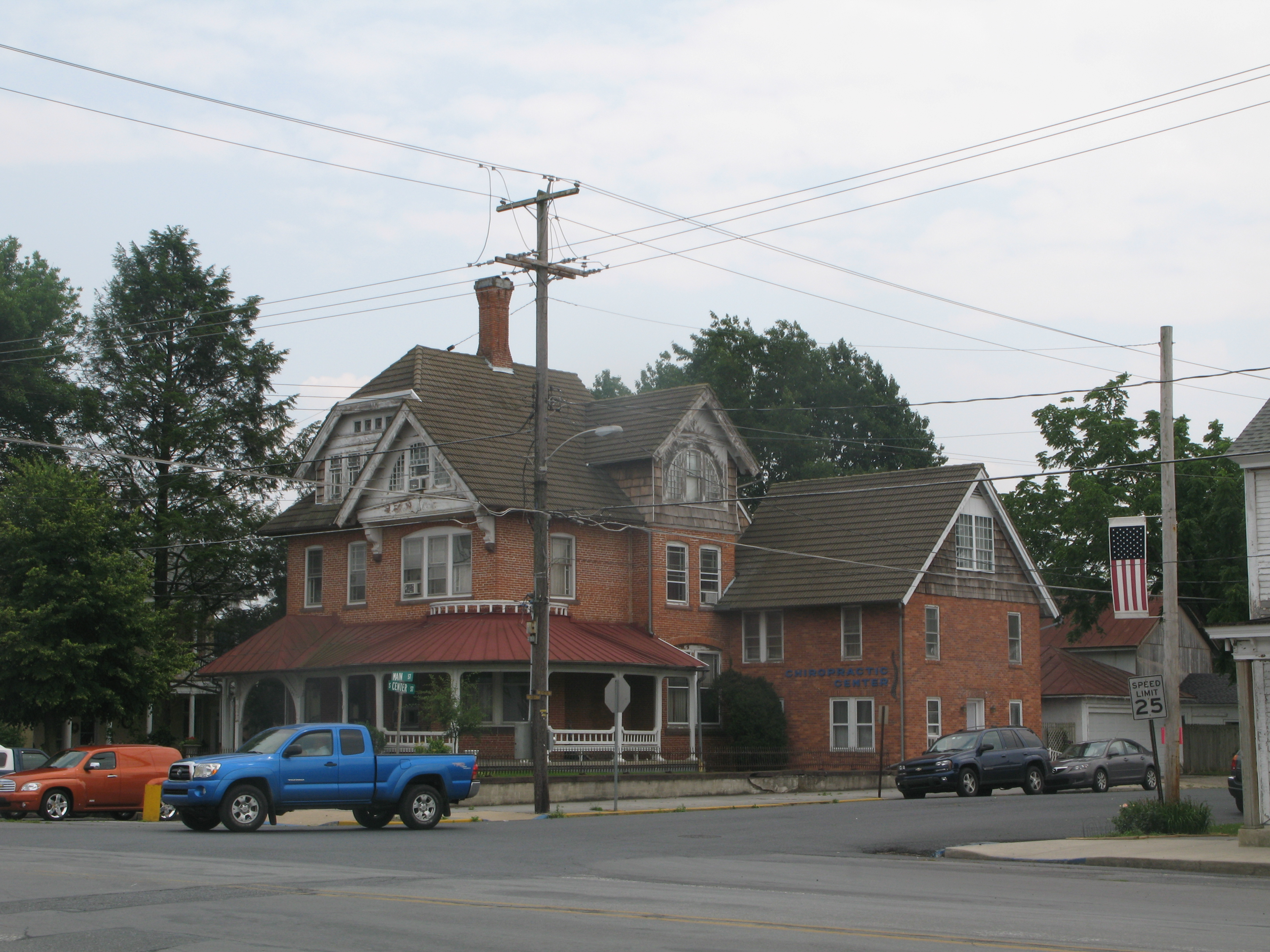
- Fredericksburg, the largest community in the township

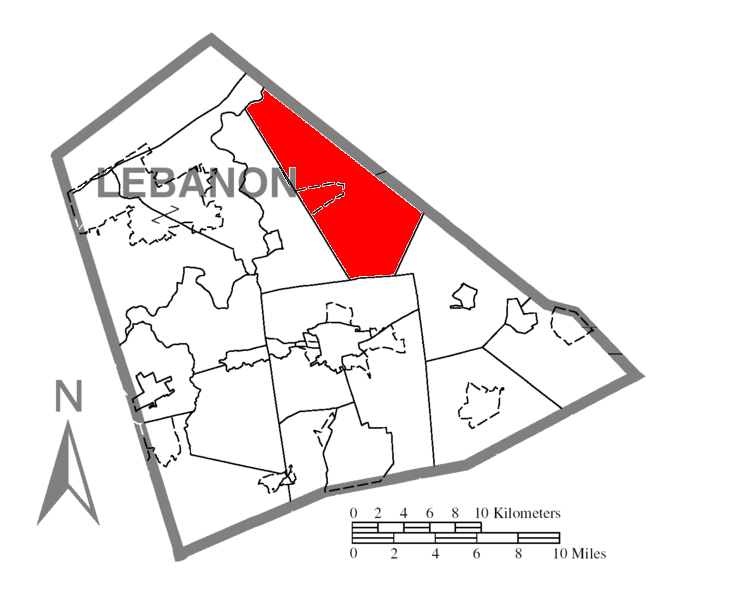
- Location in Lebanon County

- Location of Lebanon County in Pennsylvania
- Country: United States
- State: Pennsylvania
- County: Lebanon
- Settled: 1737
- Incorporated: 1793

Area
  - Total: 34.61 sq mi (89.64 km^{2})
  - Land: 34.59 sq mi (89.58 km^{2})
  - Water: 0.027 sq mi (0.07 km^{2})

Population (2020)
  - Total: 5,114 ▲
  - Estimate (2021): 5,225
  - Density: 150/sq mi (57.9/km^{2})
- Time zone: UTC-5 (Eastern (EST))
  - Summer (DST): UTC-4 (EDT)
- Area code: 717
- FIPS code: 42-075-06040
- Website: betheltwplebanon.gov

Historical population
Census	Pop.	Note	%±
2000	4,526		—
2010	5,007		10.6%
2020	5,114		2.1%
2021 (est.)	5,225		2.2%
U.S. Decennial Census

Bethel Township is a township in Lebanon County, Pennsylvania, United States. It is part of the Lebanon, Pennsylvania Metropolitan Statistical Area. The population was 5,007 at the 2010 census. Fredericksburg is a census-designated place within the township.

== History ==
The township was named after a meeting house near the Swatara that was named after the biblical place of Bethel. It was erected from a portion of old Lebanon Township in 1739. Bethel Township was originally part of Lancaster County until Dauphin County was formed in 1785, and then Lebanon County on its forming in 1813.

== Geography ==
According to the United States Census Bureau, the township has a total area of 34.8 square miles (90 km^{2}), of which 34.7 square miles (90 km^{2}) is land and 0.04 square miles (0.10 km^{2}) (0.09%) is water.

== Recreation ==
Portions of the Appalachian National Scenic Trail, Pennsylvania State Game Lands Number 80, and the Swatara State Park are located along the northern portion of the township.

== Demographics ==
As of the census of 2000, there were 4,526 people, 1,608 households, and 1,252 families residing in the township. The population density was 130.3 inhabitants per square mile (50.3/km^{2}). There were 1,710 housing units at an average density of 49.2 per square mile (19.0/km^{2}). The racial makeup of the township was 98.14% White, 0.27% African American, 0.11% Native American, 0.24% Asian, 0.77% from other races, and 0.46% from two or more races. 1.55% of the population were Hispanic or Latino of any race.

There were 1,608 households, out of which 35.0% had children under the age of 18 living with them, 66.2% were married couples living together, 7.3% had a female householder with no husband present, and 22.1% were non-families. 17.8% of all households were made up of individuals, and 7.1% had someone living alone who was 65 years of age or older. The average household size was 2.81 and the average family size was 3.19.

In the township the population was spread out, with 27.9% under the age of 18, 8.0% from 18 to 24, 29.3% from 25 to 44, 23.8% from 45 to 64, and 11.0% who were 65 years of age or older. The median age was 36 years. For every 100 females, there were 103.5 males. For every 100 females age 18 and over, there were 102.5 males.

The median income for a household in the township was $41,790, and the median income for a family was $47,415. Males had a median income of $31,278 versus $26,411 for females. The per capita income for the township was $17,093. 8.1% of the population and 6.1% of families were below the poverty line. Out of the total population, 12.9% of those under the age of 18 and 13.7% of those 65 and older were living below the poverty line.
