= Jonestown, Lebanon County, Pennsylvania =

Borough in Pennsylvania, US

Jonestown, Pennsylvania
- Borough
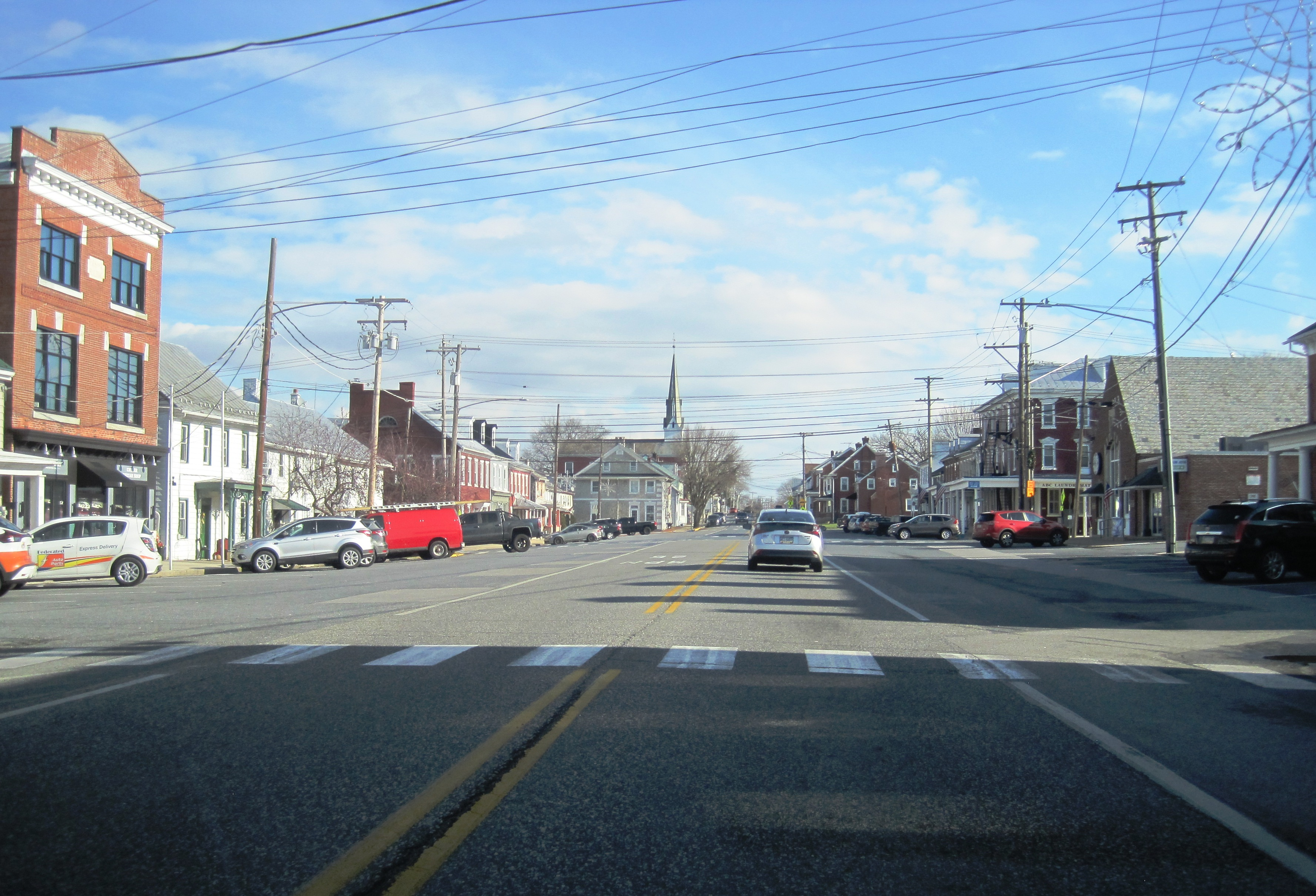
- Eastbound Market Street in downtown Jonestown

- Location of Jonestown in Lebanon County, Pennsylvania

- Location in Pennsylvania Location in the United States
- Coordinates: 40°24′50″N 76°28′45″W
- Country: United States
- State: Pennsylvania
- County: Lebanon
- Settled: 1761
- Incorporated: 1870

Government
  - Type: Borough Council
  - Mayor: Joe Quairoli
  - Council President: Dawn Sellers
  - Council Vice President: Robin Wolferd

Area
  - Total: 0.63 sq mi (1.64 km^{2})
  - Land: 0.63 sq mi (1.64 km^{2})
  - Water: 0 sq mi (0.00 km^{2})

Population (2020)
  - Total: 1,638
  - Density: 2,585.5/sq mi (998.28/km^{2})
- Time zone: UTC-5 (Eastern (EST))
  - Summer (DST): UTC-4 (EDT)
- ZIP Code: 17038
- Area code: 717
- FIPS code: 42-38400
- GNIS feature ID: 1215364
- Website: https://jonestownpa.org/

Jonestown, previously known as Williamsburg, is a borough in Lebanon County, Pennsylvania, United States. It is part of the Lebanon metropolitan statistical area. The population was 1,629 at the 2020 census.

== Geography ==
Jonestown is located at 40°24′50″N 76°28′45″W (40.414001, -76.479030). According to the U.S. Census Bureau, the borough has a total area of 0.6 square miles (1.6 km^{2}), all of which is land.

Jonestown is bordered to the north, east, and south by Swatara Township, and to the west by Union Township.

== Demographics ==
Historical population
| Census | Pop. | Note | %± |
|---|---|---|---|
| 1880 | 703 | | — |
| 1890 | 643 | | −8.5% |
| 1900 | 571 | | −11.2% |
| 1910 | 603 | | 5.6% |
| 1920 | 580 | | −3.8% |
| 1930 | 624 | | 7.6% |
| 1940 | 721 | | 15.5% |
| 1950 | 853 | | 18.3% |
| 1960 | 813 | | −4.7% |
| 1970 | 954 | | 17.3% |
| 1980 | 814 | | −14.7% |
| 1990 | 931 | | 14.4% |
| 2000 | 1,028 | | 10.4% |
| 2010 | 1,905 | | 85.3% |
| 2020 | 1,629 | | −14.5% |
| 2021 (est.) | 1,634 | | 0.3% |

As of the 2010 census, there were 1,905 people living in the borough. The racial makeup of the borough was 89.9% White, 1.8% Black, 1.0% Asian, 0.4% from some other race and 1.3% from two or more races. 5.6% were Hispanic or Latino of any race.

As of the 2000 census, there were 1,028 people, 402 households, and 272 families living in the borough. The population density was 1,597.0 inhabitants per square mile (616.6/km^{2}). There were 418 housing units at an average density of 649.4 per square mile (250.7/km^{2}). The racial makeup of the borough was 97.67% White, 1.26% African American, 0.19% Native American, 0.19% Asian, 0.58% from other races, and 0.10% from two or more races. Hispanic or Latino of any race were 1.85% of the population.

There were 402 households, out of which 34.1% had children under the age of 18 living with them, 52.5% were married couples living together, 12.2% had a female householder with no husband present, and 32.1% were non-families. 28.4% of all households were made up of individuals, and 7.2% had someone living alone who was 65 years of age or older. The average household size was 2.53 and the average family size was 3.12.

In the borough, the population was spread out, with 27.2% under the age of 18, 8.0% from 18 to 24, 31.9% from 25 to 44, 21.3% from 45 to 64, and 11.6% who were 65 years of age or older. The median age was 35 years. For every 100 females there were 107.3 males. For every 100 females age 18 and over, there were 98.9 males.

The median income for a household in the borough was $36,000, and the median income for a family was $45,208. Males had a median income of $30,700 versus $20,724 for females. The per capita income for the borough was $15,322. About 6.9% of families and 9.7% of the population were below the poverty line, including 14.8% of those under age 18 and 6.5% of those age 65 or over.
