= Swatara Township, Lebanon County, Pennsylvania =

Township in Pennsylvania, US

Coordinates: 40°30′16″N 76°30′59″W

- Township
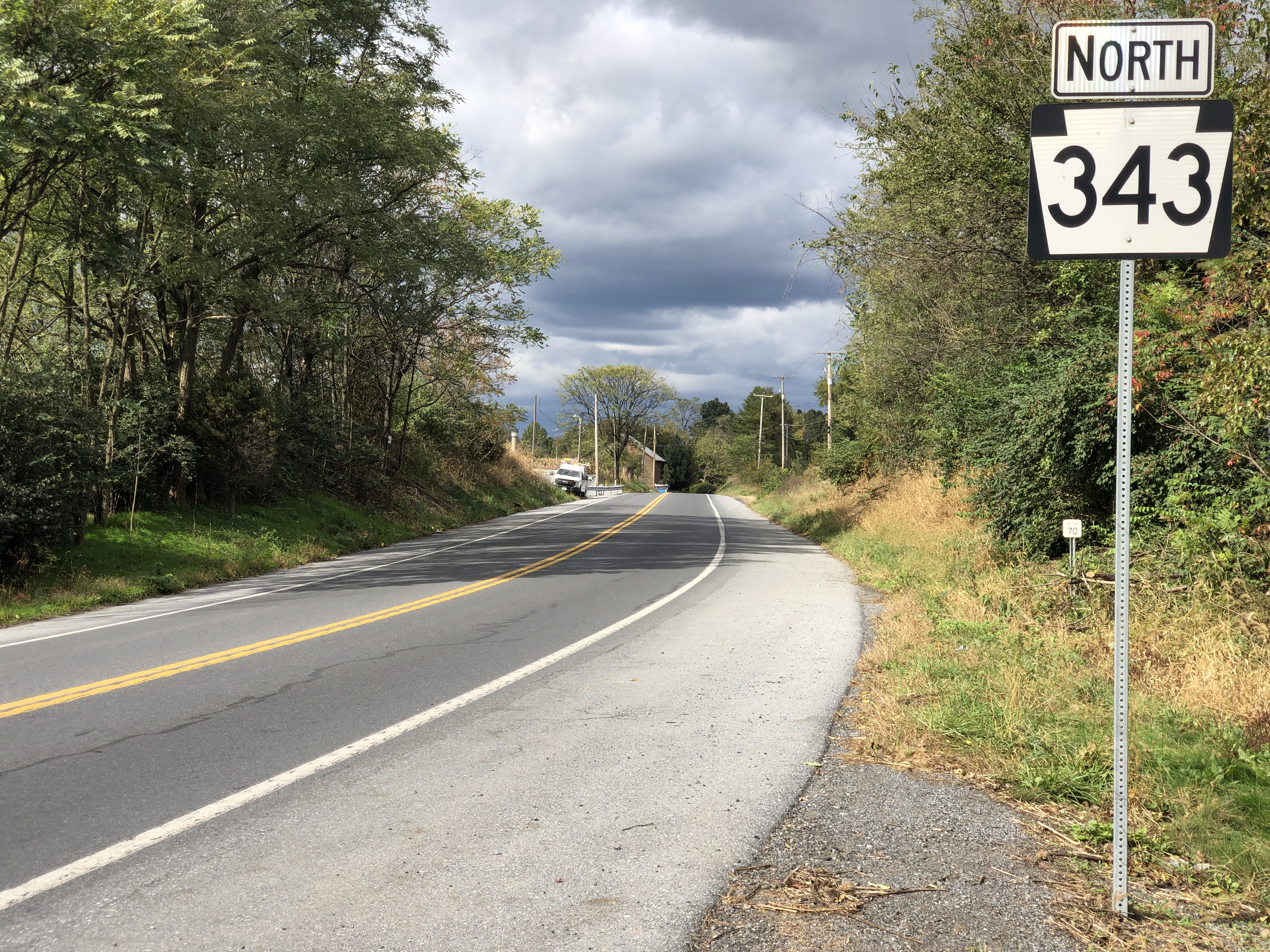
- PA 343 in Swatara Township

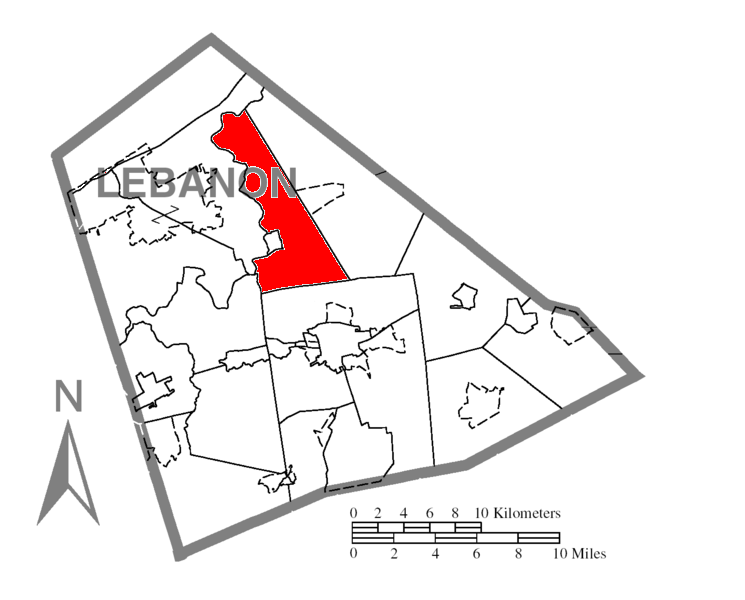
- Location in Lebanon County, Pennsylvania

- Map of Lebanon County, Pennsylvania
- Country: United States
- State: Pennsylvania
- County: Lebanon
- Settled: 1737
- Incorporated: 1813

Area
  - Total: 21.57 sq mi (55.87 km^{2})
  - Land: 21.57 sq mi (55.86 km^{2})
  - Water: 0.0077 sq mi (0.02 km^{2})

Population (2020)
  - Total: 5,045 ▲
  - Estimate (2021): 5,033
  - Density: 218.0/sq mi (84.18/km^{2})
- Time zone: UTC-5 (Eastern (EST))
  - Summer (DST): UTC-4 (EDT)
- Area code: 717
- FIPS code: 42-075-75680
- Website: www.swataratownshiplebanon.org

Historical population
Census	Pop.	Note	%±
2000	3,941		—
2010	4,555		15.6%
2020	5,045		10.8%
2021 (est.)	5,033		−0.2%
U.S. Decennial Census

Swatara Township is a township in Lebanon County, Pennsylvania, United States. It is part of the Lebanon, PA Metropolitan Statistical Area. The population was 5,045 at the 2020 census.

== Geography ==
According to the United States Census Bureau, the township has a total area of 21.2 square miles (54.9 km^{2}), of which 21.2 square miles (54.8 km^{2}) is land and 0.05% is water.

== Demographics ==
As of the census of 2000, there were 3,941 people, 1,432 households, and 1,125 families residing in the township. The population density was 186.1 inhabitants per square mile (71.9/km^{2}). There were 1,487 housing units at an average density of 70.2 per square mile (27.1/km^{2}). The racial makeup of the township was 97.31% White, 1.12% African American, 0.18% Native American, 0.58% Asian, 0.18% from other races, and 0.63% from two or more races. Hispanic or Latino of any race were 0.99% of the population.

There were 1,432 households, out of which 35.3% had children under the age of 18 living with them, 66.3% were married couples living together, 8.2% had a female householder with no husband present, and 21.4% were non-families. 17.1% of all households were made up of individuals, and 5.2% had someone living alone who was 65 years of age or older. The average household size was 2.74 and the average family size was 3.09.

In the township the population was spread out, with 25.7% under the age of 18, 7.8% from 18 to 24, 31.8% from 25 to 44, 25.1% from 45 to 64, and 9.7% who were 65 years of age or older. The median age was 36 years. For every 100 females, there were 103.1 males. For every 100 females age 18 and over, there were 101.6 males.

The median income for a household in the township was $43,109, and the median income for a family was $45,459. Males had a median income of $32,091 versus $21,968 for females. The per capita income for the township was $20,440. About 4.6% of families and 5.7% of the population were below the poverty line, including 10.1% of those under age 18 and 9.5% of those age 65 or over.
