= Hamilton Group =

Geological Group in North America

Coordinates: 40°44′05″N 77°46′42″W

Hamilton Group or Millboro Shale
- Stratigraphic range: Eifelian - Famennian
- Type: Group
- Sub-units: Western Pennsylvania and West Virginia: Mahantango Formation New York and Central Pennsylvania: Moscow Formation Ludlowville Formation Skaneatales Formation Marcellus Formation
- Underlies: Tully Limestone and Harrell Shale
- Overlies: Onondaga Limestone
- Thickness: up to 2,500 feet (800 m)

Lithology
- Primary: Shale
- Other: Limestone, Siltstone, Claystone

Location
- Region: Appalachian Basin of eastern North America
- Extent: Maryland, New York, Pennsylvania, Virginia, West Virginia and Ontario, Canada

Type section
- Named for: Hamilton, New York
- Named by: James Hall

The Hamilton Group is a Devonian-age geological group which is located in the Appalachian region of the United States. It is present in New York, Pennsylvania, Maryland, Ohio, West Virginia, northwestern Virginia and Ontario, Canada, and is mainly composed of marine shale with some sandstone.

There are two main formations encompassed by the group: the Mahantango Formation and the Marcellus Shale. In southwestern Virginia, where the two sub-units are not easily distinguishable, the Hamilton Group is broadly equivalent to the Millboro Shale or Millboro Formation.

The group is named for the village of Hamilton, New York. These rocks are the oldest strata of the Devonian gas shale sequence.

Generalized stratigraphic nomenclature for the Middle Devonian strata in the Appalachian Basin.

== Stratigraphic Setting ==
In western Pennsylvania, Ohio and West Virginia the Hamilton Group consists of the Mahantango Formation, a gray, dark gray, brown, and olive laminated shale; siltstone; and very fine-grained sandstone or claystone containing marine fossils. The uppermost The Mahantango Formation includes these members in descending order: Sherman Ridge, Montebello sandstone, Fisher Ridge, Dalmatia, and Turkey Ridge. In south-central Pennsylvania, it includes Clearville, Frame, Chaneysville, and Gander Run Members. Its thickness in Maryland ranges from 600 feet in the west, increasing to 1,200 feet in the east, and approximately 1000 feet thick in central Pennsylvania. Clay layers of the Mahantango Formation are particularly rich in fossils.

In New York, central and eastern Pennsylvania the upper sections contain several thick grey shale formations, occasionally marked with limestone stringer. In descending order they are the: Moscow Formation which contains the North Evans Limestone, Windom Shale, Kashong Shale and at the base Tichenor Limestone. Next is the Ludlowville Formation, this contains the Jaycox Shale, Owasco Shale, Spafford Shale, Wanakah Shale / Ivy Point Shale, Ledyard Shale / Otisco Shale and Centerfield Limestone. The Skaneateles formation contains the Levanna Member and the Stafford Limestone. The base of the Stafford Limestone marks the top of the Marcellus Shale, a fissile gray-black to black, thinly laminated, pyritic, carbonaceous thin shale with sparse marine fauna and siderite concretions. The Marcellus Formation contains a local limestones Purcell Member and Cherry Valley as well as Tioga Bentonites at the base in central and eastern Pennsylvania. Its thickness in Maryland ranges from 250 feet in east, increasing to 500 feet in the west.

In eastern New York the Hamilton contains Mannorkill Formation, Potter Hollow Formation, Portland Point Limestone (member), Plattekill Formation, Panther Mountain Formation, Cherry Valley Limestone, and Bakoven Shale.

The total thickness of the Hamilton Group in Pennsylvania runs about 970 feet. In New York State, it thickens from 250 feet near Lake Erie to over 2,500 feet in Ulster and Greene counties. Depths ranging from outcrops to 8,000 feet below the surface of Sullivan County, in the southeastern part of New York state.

In Ontario, Canada, the Hamilton Group formations are, in ascending order, Bell, Rockport Quarry, Arkona, Hungry Hollow, Widder, and Ipperwash; the Kettle Point Formation of the late Devonian lies unconformably above.

The Hamilton Group, Tioga Bentonites, and Needmore Shale were formerly called the Romney Formation.

- The Geneseo Shale is a dark grey to black shale that overlies the Tully Limestone; it includes the Filmore beds.
- The Tully Limestone is a shallow-water carbonaceous unit.
- The Moscow Formation (Middle Devonian / Givetian) comprises grey to black shales interbedded with limestones and calcareous mudstones and usually bioturbated.

== Age ==
Relative age dating of the Hamilton places it in the middle and lower Devonian period. In Maryland, it rests conformably atop the Tioga Metabentonite, a thin layer of laminated shale lying over the Needmore Shale. In other regions, the Needmore Shale is replaced by laterally equivalent units such as limestone and shale of the Onondaga Formation, or chert of the Huntersville Chert.

The Hamilton Group lies conformably below the Brallier Formation (formerly Woodmont Shale, dark laminated shale) at its southern extent. Further north, it is overlain by the Tully Limestone, though some consider the Tully Limestone a subunit of the Mahantango Formation. The Tully Limestone is succeeded by the dark laminated Harrell Shale. In 2012, Read and Erikson reported the group as dating from the Eifelian to Famennian in Virginia.

== Fossils ==
=== Brachiopoda ===
Tropidoleptus carinatus

Nucleospira concinna

Mucrospirifer

Athyris

=== Coral ===
Pleurodictyum americanum

=== Mollusca ===
==== Bivalvia ====
Orthonota undulate

=== Trilobita ===
Dipleura

== Economic Resources ==
The Hamilton is a good source of road material, riprap and building stone, that is used locally for shale aggregate and common fill.
