= Old Port Formation =

- Stratigraphic range: Early Devonian
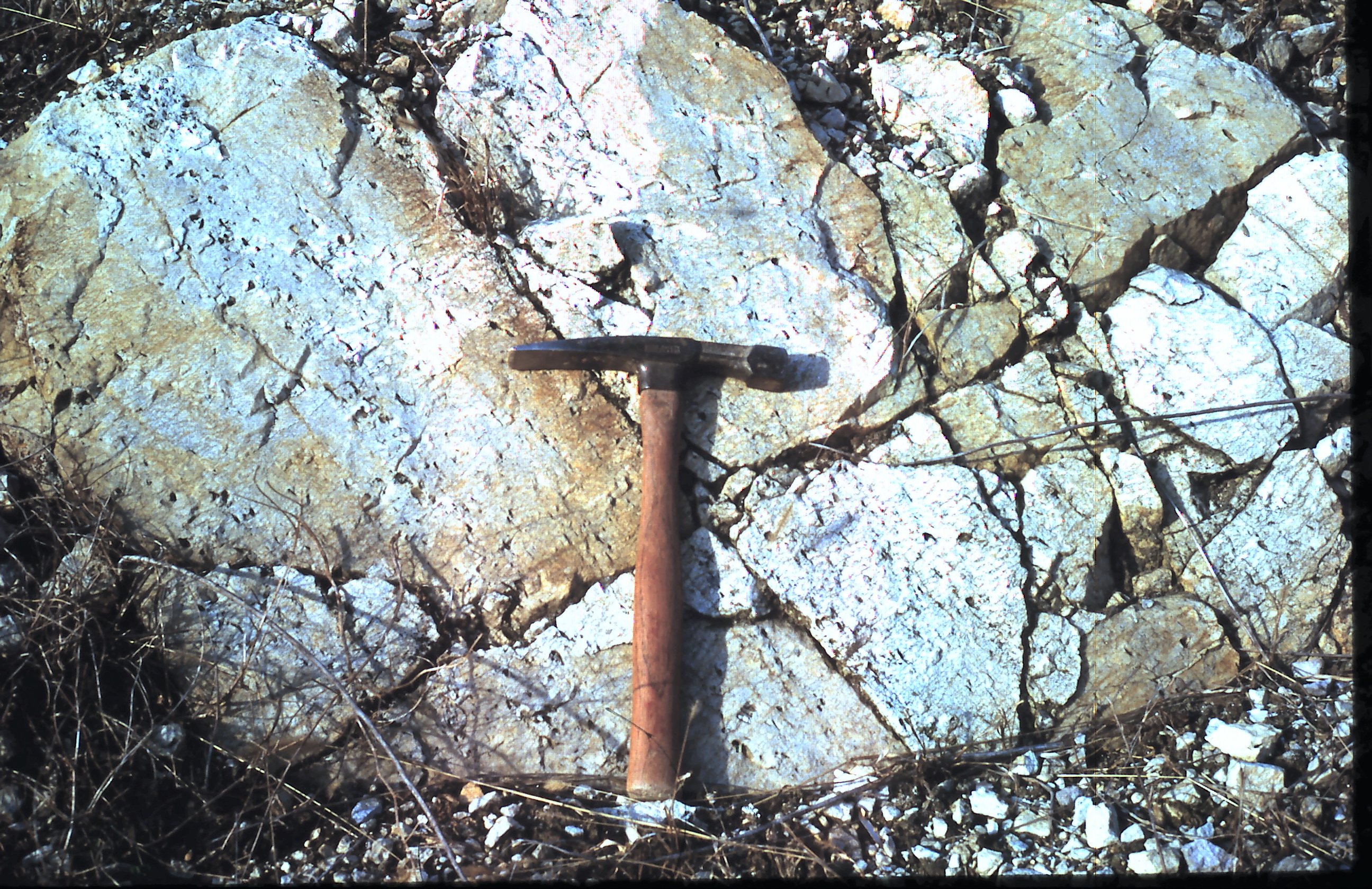
- Ridgeley Member of the Old Port Formation
- Type: sedimentary
- Unit of: Helderberg Group
- Sub-units: Ridgeley, Shriver, Mandata, Corriganville, and New Creek Members
- Underlies: Onondaga Formation
- Overlies: Keyser Formation
- Thickness: 150 to 190 ft (Mifflintown Quadrangle in PA)

Lithology
- Primary: limestone, sandstone
- Other: chert, shale

Location
- Region: Appalachian Mountains
- Extent: Pennsylvania, Maryland, Virginia, West Virginia

Type section
- Named by: Conlin and Hoskins, 1962

The Devonian Old Port Formation is a mapped bedrock unit in Pennsylvania, USA. Details of the type section and of stratigraphic nomenclature for this unit as used by the U.S. Geological Survey are available on-line at the National Geologic Map Database. Current nomenclature usage by U.S. Geological Survey restricts the name Old Port Formation to Pennsylvania, but correlative units are present in adjacent states.

== Description ==
The Old Port Formation consists of limestone, sandstone, shale, and chert.

== Stratigraphic Setting ==
The Old Port Formation is divided into several members with varying lithologies, which are (in ascending stratigraphic order): New Creek Member (limestone), Corriganville Member (limestone), Mandata Member (shale), Shriver Member (cherty limestone), and Ridgeley Member (sandstone). Where the Shriver Chert does not occur it may be replaced by the Licking Creek Limestone. It was originally combined from the Helderberg Group and Oriskany Group by Conlin and Hoskins in 1962 to form a single Formation with the above members.

=== Ridgeley Member ===
The Ridgeley Member was first described as a member of the Oriskany Formation by Swartz and others (1913), as a calcareous sandstone which passes into an arenaceous limestone. It is still mapped as part of the Oriskany Group in New Jersey.

The type locality is at the town of Ridgeley, Mineral County, West Virginia.

The sandstone of the Ridgeley Member has been extensively mined due to its very pure quartz suitable for glass. The glass derived from the sandstone was used for lenses on the Hubble Space Telescope.

A separate formation, the Oriskany Sandstone, is a lateral equivalent of the Ridgeley Member, but bounded above and below by unconformities.

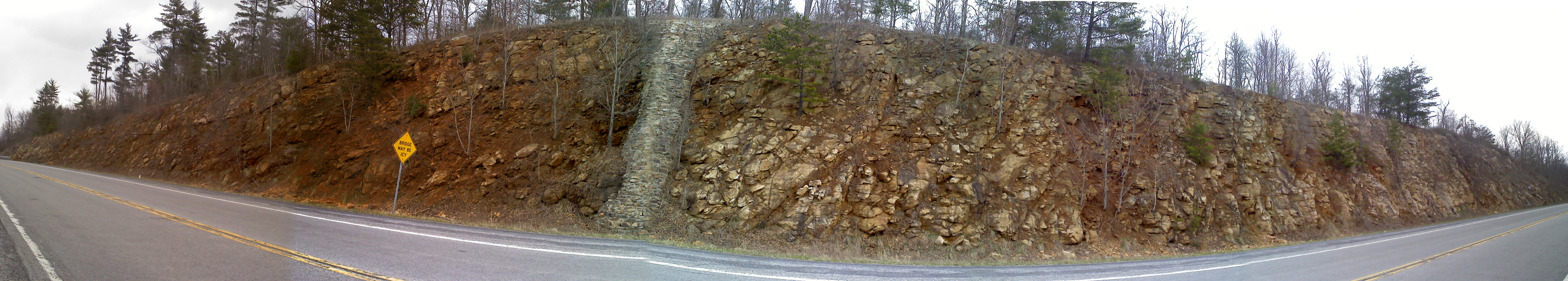
A panorama of a roadcut through the Ridgeley Member along U.S. Route 522 north of Shirleysburg, Huntingdon County, Pennsylvania, April 2011

=== Shriver Member ===
The Shriver Member, or Shriver Chert, was first described as a member of the Oriskany Formation by Swartz and others (1913), as dark siliceous shale with much black impure chert in nodules or layers of nodules. It is named after Shriver Ridge (the type locality), Allegany County, Maryland, and was originally mapped as the basal unit of the Oriskany Formation.

In Maryland and West Virginia, the Shriver is mapped as part of the Helderberg Group.

In central Pennsylvania it is mapped as part of the Old Port Formation.

In New Jersey it is mapped as the middle unit of the Oriskany Group.

=== Mandata Member ===
The Mandata Shale of the Helderberg Group was first introduced by F. M. Swartz in 1938, mainly with reference to the overlying Licking Creek Limestone. The type locality is about 0.25 miles south of Mandata, Pennsylvania, on Route 225.

=== Corriganville Member ===
The Corriganville Limestone was first described by J. W. Head in 1972 as part of the Helderberg Group in Allegany County, Maryland, as a gray limestone with chert. C. R. Wood first mapped it as part of the Old Port Formation in Pennsylvania.

The type locality is a railroad cut 0.3 mi southeast of Corriganville, Alleghany County, Maryland.

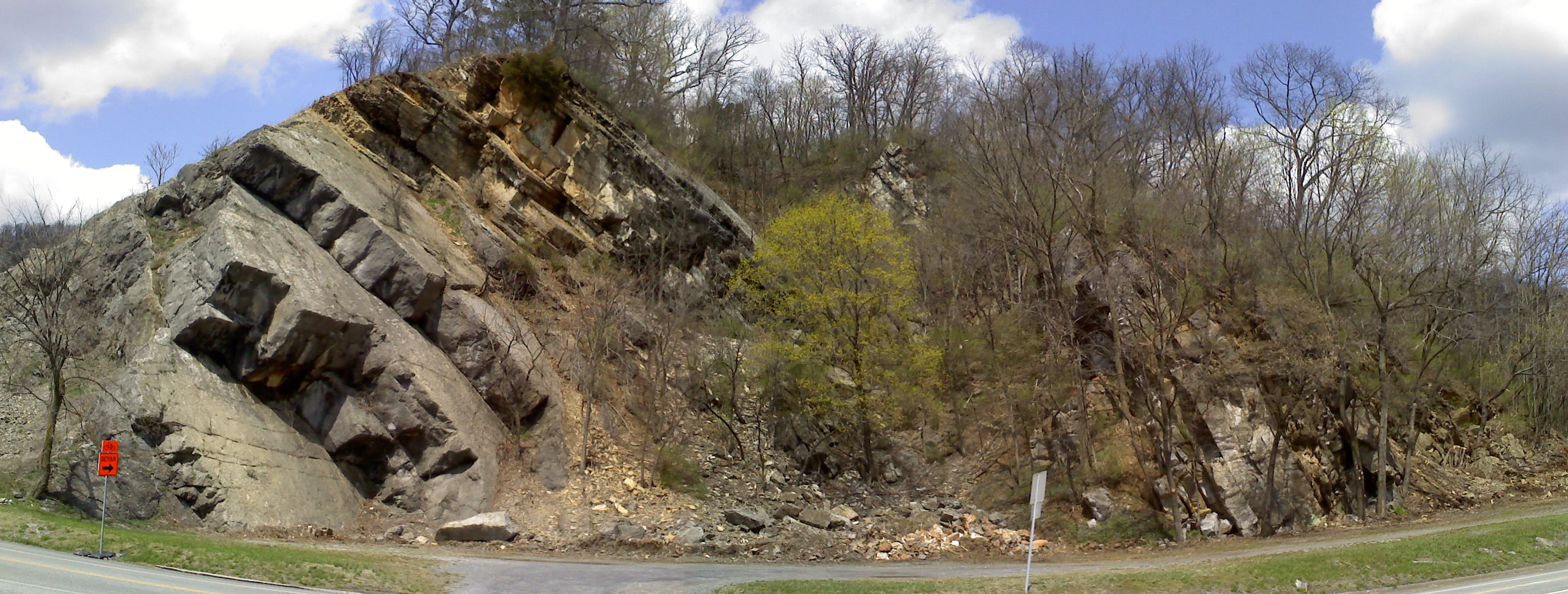
A panorama of outcrop of Keyser Formation (left) and Corriganville and New Creek Members in Everett, Pennsylvania along Business Route 30 (West Main Street), facing north, April 2011

=== New Creek Member ===
The New Creek Member was first described by Bowen only as a limestone that is replaced by the Elbow Ridge Sandstone near Hancock, Maryland. Bowen later described it as a massive limestone overlying the Keyser Formation. C. R. Wood first mapped it as part of the Old Port Formation in Pennsylvania.

=== Licking Creek Member ===
The Licking Creek Limestone of the Helderberg Group was first introduced by F. M. Swartz in 1938, and was described more fully in 1939. The unit consists of layers and nodules of black chert interbedded with light-gray crystalline limestone. The type locality is a bluff on the south side of Licking Creek, about one mile east of Warren Point, Franklin County, Pennsylvania.

== Notable Exposures ==
- Old quarry in Tyrone, Pennsylvania, west of Sink Run and along U.S. Route 22
- Two exposures in Everett, Pennsylvania:
  - U.S. Route 30 (Everett Bypass) roadcut through Warrior Ridge north of Everett
  - Another exposure along business Route 30 on the west side of Everett (pictured above)
- The Sinnett-Thorn Mountain Cave System is developed in the Keyser Formation and overlying New Creek and Corriganville Limestone Members

See also type localities listed in subsections above.

== Fossils ==
Brachiopods are occasionally abundant (as casts) in the Ridgeley Member.

The brachiopods Costispirifer arenosus, Beachia immatura, Leptocoelia flabellites, Metaplasia paucicostata, Plicoplasia tribuarius, and Chonetes hudsonicus are present in the Shriver Member around the type locality of Shriver Ridge. Ostracods are also present in the Shriver Member.

The Old Port Formation contains conodonts.

== Age ==
Relative age dating of the Old Port places it in the Lower Devonian period. It rests conformably atop the Keyser Formation and usually unconformably below the Needmore Formation or below the Onondaga Formation.

== Interpretation of Depositional Environments ==
Shallow marine.

== Economic Geology ==
The Ridgeley Member is mined extensively in Pennsylvania and Maryland.

== See also ==
- Geology of Pennsylvania
- List of types of limestone
