= Tioga Bentonites =

Ash bed layers in eastern and mid-western US

Tioga Ash Beds
- Stratigraphic range: Lochkovian-Eifelian; ~417.6–390.0 Ma
- Type: Geological formation
- Unit of: Helderberg Group, Onondaga Limestone and Marcellus Shale
- Sub-units: Bald Hill, Sprout Brook, Tioga Middle Course Zone, and Tioga A-G

Lithology
- Primary: Tuff

Location
- Region: Indiana, Illinois, Maryland, Michigan, New York, Ohio, Pennsylvania, Tennessee, Virginia and West Virginia
- Country: United States
- Extent: Appalachian Basin, Illinois Basin and Michigan Basin of eastern North America

Type section
- Named for: Tioga Gas Fields
- Named by: Ebright, Fettke, and Ingham

The Tioga Bentonites are a series of ash bed layers occurring in three Sedimentary basins in the eastern and midwestern United States. The primary basin they are found in is the Appalachian Basin, as well as the Illinois Basin and the Michigan Basin. Due to an unconformity these ash beds are not present in the southern Appalachians.

== Description ==
There are 7–15 layers of ash depending on the location covering ~30 million years. These numerous layers are broken down into 4 clusters. The Bald Hill K-bentonites are located in the Kalkberg Formation or New Scotland Formation were deposited 417.6 million years ago. The Sprout Brook K-bentonites are located in the Esopus Formation or Needmore Shale deposited 408.3 million years ago. One cluster called the Tioga Middle Coarse Zone (MCZ) is located in the Onondaga Group deposited 391.4 million years ago. Finally Tioga A-G K-bentonites are located in the Onodaga Group and the Union Springs Member of the Marcellus Formation deposited 390.0 million years ago.

The volcanic ash was deposited in sea water. After sedimentation covered these beds the ash was slowly converted to a meta-Bentonite called Illite. These layers are important because they allow very precise dating of the ash bed with K–Ar dating. Potassium 40 decays at a known rate into Argon 40. Argon is an inert gas. It is released from the rock once it is molten so once the rock or ash solidifies the clock is reset. So when the ratio between K40 and Ar40 is measured the more Ar40 trapped in the rock compared to K40 the older the rock is.
