= Becraft Formation =

- Stratigraphic range: Early Devonian
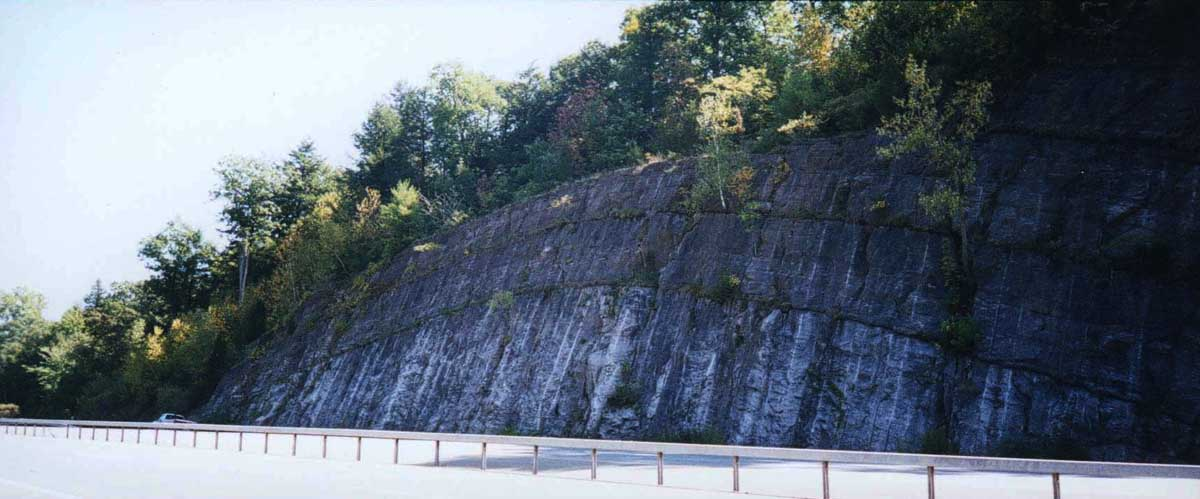
- A road cut of an anticline near Kingston, New York. The bottom layer is the Becraft Formation.
- Type: Geologic formation
- Unit of: Helderberg Group
- Underlies: Alsen Formation
- Overlies: New Scotland Formation
- Thickness: Variable, up to 27 m (89 ft)

Lithology
- Primary: Limestone
- Other: Shale

Location
- Region: Mid-Atlantic
- Country: United States

Type section
- Named for: Becraft Mountain, New York
- Named by: Hall (1893)

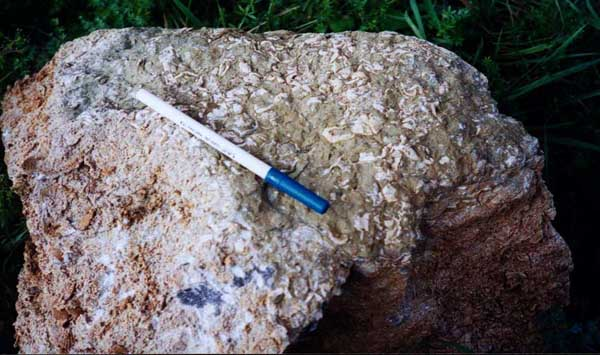
A piece of the Becraft Formation showing an abundance of crinoid and brachiopod fossils.

The Becraft Formation is a geologic formation of marine sedimentary rock found in New York State. The Becraft is a part of the lower Devonian Helderberg Group and conformably overlies the New Scotland Formation and is overlain by the Alsen Formation throughout the lower Hudson Valley of New York State. The formation is Gedinnian in age. Outcrops of the formation are found from the New York-New Jersey border to the Helderbergs of Albany County, New York and as far west as Schoharie County, New York. The thickness of the formation varies from around 3 meters in Canajoharie to 8 meters thick in Albany and swells to 27 meters near Kingston. The Becraft Formation is named for Becraft Mountain in western Columbia County, New York where it prominently crops out.

== Geology ==
=== Description ===
The Becraft Formation is a coarse limestone with occasional thin interbedded shale layers. Individual limestone beds within the formation range from 5 to 15 centimeters in thickness, while the shale horizons are up to 3 centimeters thick. Chert nodules are found near the top of the formation. The limestone which constitutes the bulk of the formation is pinkish grey in color and contains abundant invertebrate fossils including brachiopods and crinoids. The Becraft is a grainstone in Dunham classification. Recently the Helderberg Group, of which the Becraft Formation is a member, has been investigated as a possible geologic seal for subsurface carbon dioxide sequestration efforts.

=== Deposition ===
The Becraft Formation was likely deposited in a shallow, high-energy marine environment similar to the depositional environment of the Coeymans Formation which underlies the Becraft within the Helderberg Group. After the mountain building events of the Taconic Orogeny around 440 million years ago, the eastern edge of North America became a passive margin. During this period in the Early Devonian, much of the Appalachian Basin was flooded with seawater producing a shallow, tropical marine environment. The Becraft Formation was deposited as part of a carbonate platform which developed within this basin prior to the onset of the Acadian orogeny in the Middle Devonian.

== See also ==
- List of types of limestone
