= Warrenpoint (disambiguation) =

Warrenpoint is a town in County Down.

Warrenpoint or Warren Point may also refer to:

== Events ==
- Warrenpoint ambush, an IRA bomb attack against the British Army in the town of Warrenpoint

== Organisations ==
- Warrenpoint and Rostrevor Tramway, a former tramway in County Down
- Warrenpoint Town F.C., an Association Football club
- Warrenpoint GAA, a Gaelic Athletic Association club

== Geography ==
- Warrenpoint (Knauertown, Pennsylvania), a historic home
- Warren Point, New Jersey, a neighbourhood of Fair Lawn, New Jersey
- Warren Point, Wembury, a promontory in Devon on the South West Coast Path, southeast of Plymouth
- Warren Point County Wildlife Site, a wildlife site located on a promontory in Devon, northwest of Plymouth
- Warren Point (Washington), a cape
- Warren Point, Pennsylvania, a former town in Franklin County, Pennsylvania
