= Onondaga Limestone =

Hard limestones rock formation in North America

Coordinates: 43°N 79°W

- Stratigraphic range: Eifelian-Givetian; ~392–383 Ma
- Onondaga Limestone blocks with flint nodules in the walls of Old Fort Erie
- Type: Geological formation
- Sub-units: Seneca; Moorehouse; Nedrow; Edgecliff
- Underlies: Hamilton Group and Marcellus Formation
- Overlies: Helderberg Group, Huntersville Chert, Old Port Formation, Oriskany Sandstone, and Schoharie Formation

Lithology
- Primary: Limestone
- Other: Chert

Location
- Region: Maryland, New York, Ohio, Pennsylvania, West Virginia, Ontario
- Country: United States, Canada
- Extent: Appalachian Basin of eastern North America

Type section
- Named for: Onondaga, NY
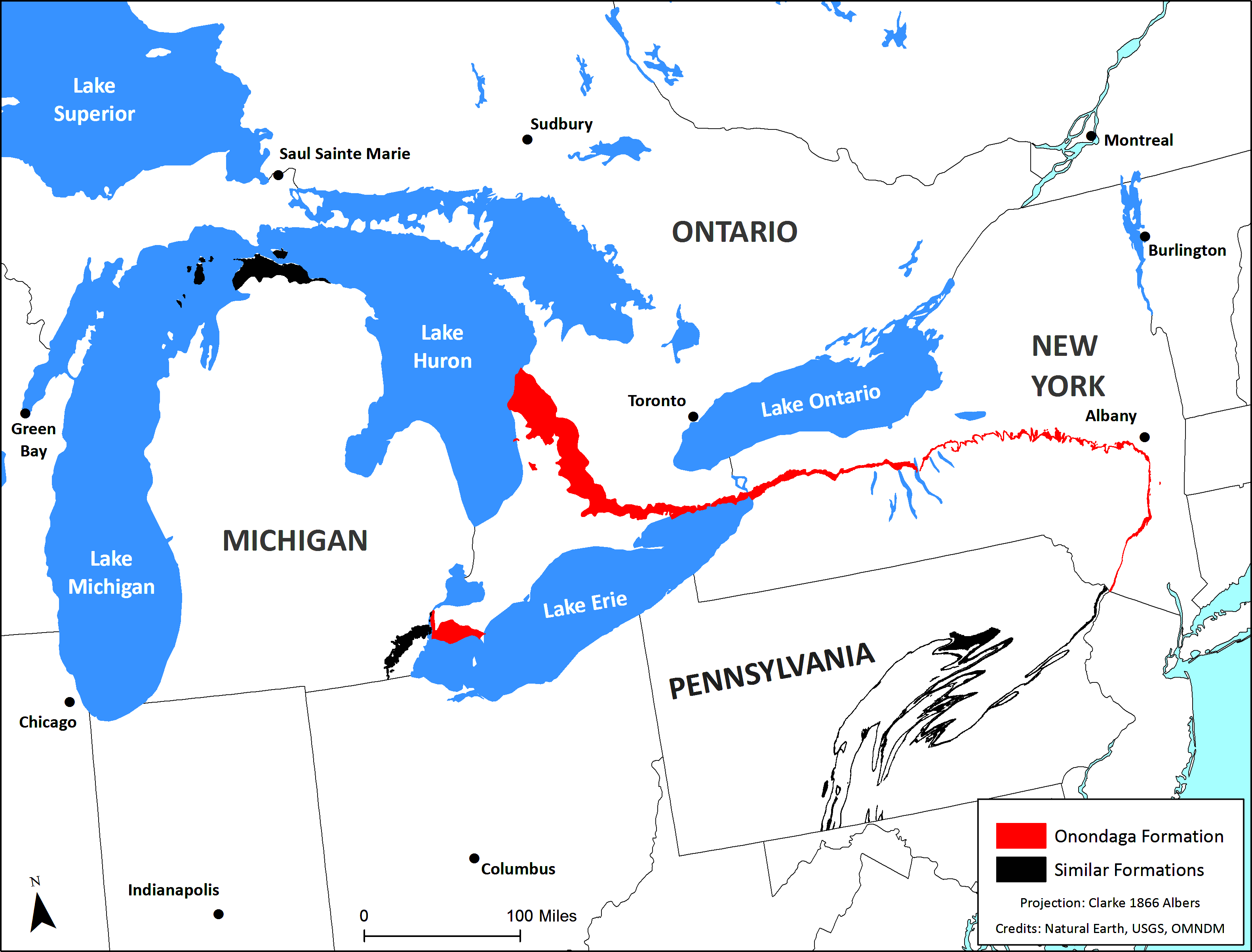
- Location of the Onondaga limestone outcrop in New York State, USA and Ontario, Canada

The Onondaga Limestone is a group of hard limestones and dolomites of Devonian age that forms geographic features in some areas in which it outcrops; in others, especially its Southern Ontario portion, the formation can be less prominent as a local surface feature.

In upstate New York and the Niagara peninsula of southern Ontario the sedimentary rocks tend to dip downward in a generally southern direction. The Onondaga outcrops in a line that usually forms an escarpment (the steep face of a cuesta), because of its resistance to erosion. The outcrop can be traced from the Hudson River valley westward along the southern rim of the Mohawk River valley, passing just south of Syracuse, and along the northern heads of the major Finger Lakes to Buffalo, New York. From Fort Erie, Ontario westward it runs along the north shore of Lake Erie for about 85 km and continues in a west-northwest direction inland for another ~90 km to about Ingersoll and Woodstock, Ontario (as shown in the map on the right). To the west and north these rocks are known as the Amherstburg Formation of the Detroit River Group. Northwest of Ingersoll and Woodstock, across the crest of the Algonquin Arch, the band of outcrop turns more northerly, and strikes north-northwest for about 140 km to the east shore of Lake Huron in the Kincardine area (as shown in the map on the right). These rocks continue northwestwards under Lake Huron, and reappear in the northern part of the southern peninsula of Michigan, north of Alpena (as shown in the map on the right). To the west, its equivalent, the Detroit River Group, outcrops near Detroit and Windsor just north of the Lake Erie shoreline (as shown in the map on the right). The Detroit River Group is not topographically distinct west of Windsor in Michigan, but is noticeable as a steep hill just northwest of Leamington.

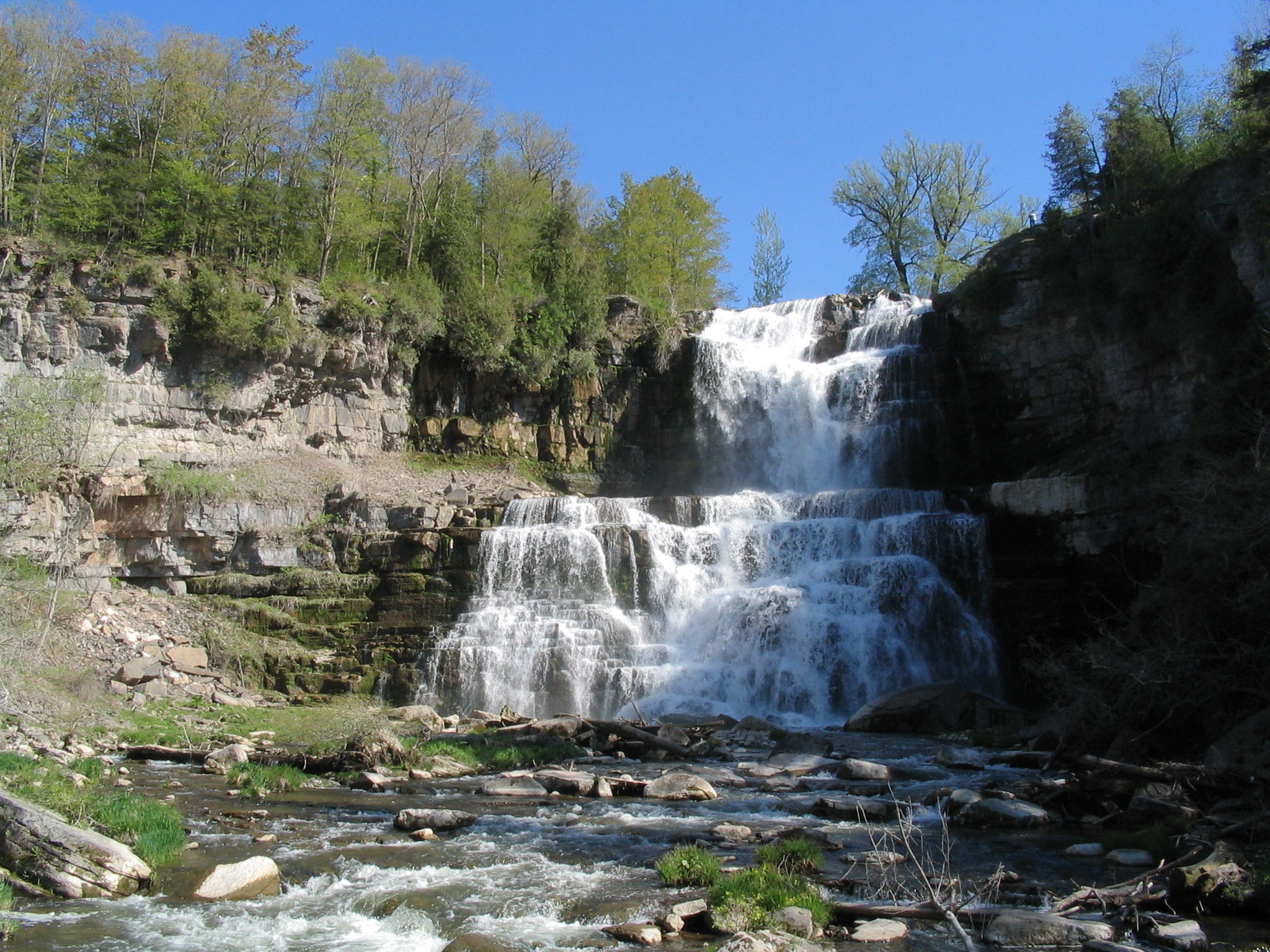
Chittenango Falls

In several spots it is breached by geologically young streams and spectacular waterfalls are formed, such as at Chittenango Falls just east of Syracuse, Buttermilk Falls at Le Roy, New York and Indian Falls west of Batavia.

A few other breaches occur in older valleys, which likely once had waterfalls, but erosion eventually obliterated them. Such breaches occur at the Tully valley, the Genesee River valley near Avon, New York, and at Port Colborne, Ontario, where the old valley forms a harbor on Lake Erie.

The formation is broken by the only major fault line in western New York, the Linden Fault just east of Batavia, where the eastern side of the fault has dropped down and the ledge moved southward relative to the western side. On the western side of the fault in Genesee County the escarpment achieves its greatest prominence. The New York State Thruway has a rock cut at Batavia which clearly shows the fault and is a popular point for geology class field trips. The fault, which runs from Attica, New York northward to Lake Ontario, is still active and periodically causes minor earthquakes in the area.

The Onondaga Limestone also can be found in other areas where rocks of the same age outcrop, such as in western Pennsylvania and Michigan but they do not form prominent geographic features.

A similar and more prominent outcrop known as the Niagara Escarpment runs parallel and about 25 miles (40 kilometers) to the north through upstate New York, and similarly curves northwestward in southern Ontario toward Lake Huron and eventually into Michigan's Upper Peninsula and Wisconsin's Door Peninsula.

Another smaller outcrop known as the Portage Escarpment lies about 35 miles (56 km) to the south, running along the southern ends of the Finger Lakes and forming Cascadilla, Ithaca and Buttermilk Falls in Ithaca.

Onondaga limestone used to build Old Fort Erie. Note the black flint nodules in the blocks

The Onondaga Escarpment contains significant outcrops of flint (a type of chert) which bears the escarpment's name. This variety of chert was of great importance to First Nations peoples throughout Southern Ontario, who used it to make stone tools (lithics) such as projectile points and hide scrapers. This variety of chert, which is of reasonably high quality and which was highly valued by First Nations peoples, is often a common variety of chert recovered archaeologically from sites relatively adjacent to outcrops; for example, Onondaga-variety chert comprises 95% of all of the flint material from some sites in Milton, Ontario. The material has also been found as well at some distance from its original source; Onondaga chert has been recovered at the late archaic Duck Lake archaeological site in northern Michigan, circa 400 kilometers from the nearest outcropping of the material. This wide distribution implies either a very large seasonal migration of ancient peoples or long-distance trade routes, with both likely being the case at different times throughout the prehistory of the Great Lakes region.

== Description ==
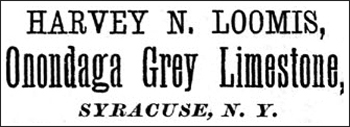
1884 label for Onondaga Limestone

The Onondaga Limestone is composed of four main subunits. In descending order:

- Seneca Member
- Moorehouse Member
- Nedrow Member
- Edgecliff Member

The Seneca and Moorehouse members are sharply divided by the Tioga-B Bentonite layer, which was formed in a very short time period as the result of a large volcanic eruption in what is now the state of Virginia.

Relative age dating of the Onondaga places its formation in the Eifelian to Givetian stage of the Middle Devonian period, or 391.9 to 383.7 Ma. Radiometric dating of a sample from the bentonite at the top of the Onondaga placed it at 390 ± 0.5 Ma. The formation is time equivalent with the Floresta Formation of the Altiplano Cundiboyacense, Colombia.

== Onondaga limestone dimension stone ==
Onondaga limestone was quarried as dimension stone for construction of limestone buildings.

The following buildings contain structural Onondaga limestone:

- Brooklyn Bridge (cable anchorages and towers below the water line) in Brooklyn, New York
- Genesee County Courthouse in Batavia, New York
- Gridley Building of Syracuse, New York
- Hall of Languages, Syracuse University, Syracuse, New York
- White Memorial Building, Syracuse, New York
