= Huntersville Chert =

Geologic formation in the United States

- Stratigraphic range: Emsian to Eifelian
- Type: Formation
- Sub-units: Bobs Ridge Sandstone Member
- Underlies: Marcellus Shale, Onondaga Limestone, Tioga Bentonites
- Overlies: Oriskany Formation

Lithology
- Primary: chert
- Other: siltstone, sandstone, limestone, dolomite

Location
- Region: Appalachia and Southeastern United States
- Country: United States
- Extent: Pennsylvania, Virginia, West Virginia

Type section
- Named for: Huntersville, West Virginia
- Named by: Price, 1929

The Huntersville Chert or Huntersville Formation is a Devonian geologic formation in the Appalachian region of the United States. It is primarily composed of mottled white, yellow, and dark grey chert, and is separated from the underlying Oriskany Sandstone by an unconformity. The Huntersville Chert is laterally equivalent to the Needmore Shale, which lies north of the New River. It is also laterally equivalent to a sandy limestone unit which is often equated with the Onondaga Limestone. to the west and the Needmore Shale to the east. These formations are placed in the Onesquethaw Stage of Appalachian chronostratigraphy, roughly equivalent to the Emsian and Eifelian stages of the broader Devonian system.

Most Huntersville Chert outcrops are located in southeastern West Virginia and southwestern Virginia, though well logs indicate that it was present deep underground in other states in the region. It represents a deep-water environment during a major transgression event. The chert has a mottled appearance due to a heterogenous structure of pure and discolored chert. The darker chert is heavily fractured and contains impurities such as glauconite pellets, silty and argillaceous grains, organic material, or dolomite and calcite crystals. The chert is at least partially biogenic, as some chert facies are primarily composed of hollow sponge spicules filled with hydrocarbons. Aeolian dust blowing in from hot, dry areas may also be responsible for some of the silica forming the chert. Compared to equivalent formations, the composition of the Huntersville Chert is at least 50% chert.

The uppermost layers of the Huntersville Chert are glauconitic sandstones rich in shells of spiriferid brachiopods. These layers have been named as the Bobs Ridge Sandstone member. They are directly overlain by a prominent ash bed, the Tioga Bentonite. The Bobs Ridge Sandstone and Tioga Bentonite indicate uplift and volcanic activity in the region, respectively. The Tioga Bentonite, sometimes called the Tioga Ash Bed or Metabentonite, lies at the base of the Marcellus Shale.
