= Marcellus Formation =

Middle Devonian age unit of sedimentary rock

- Stratigraphic range: Middle Devonian
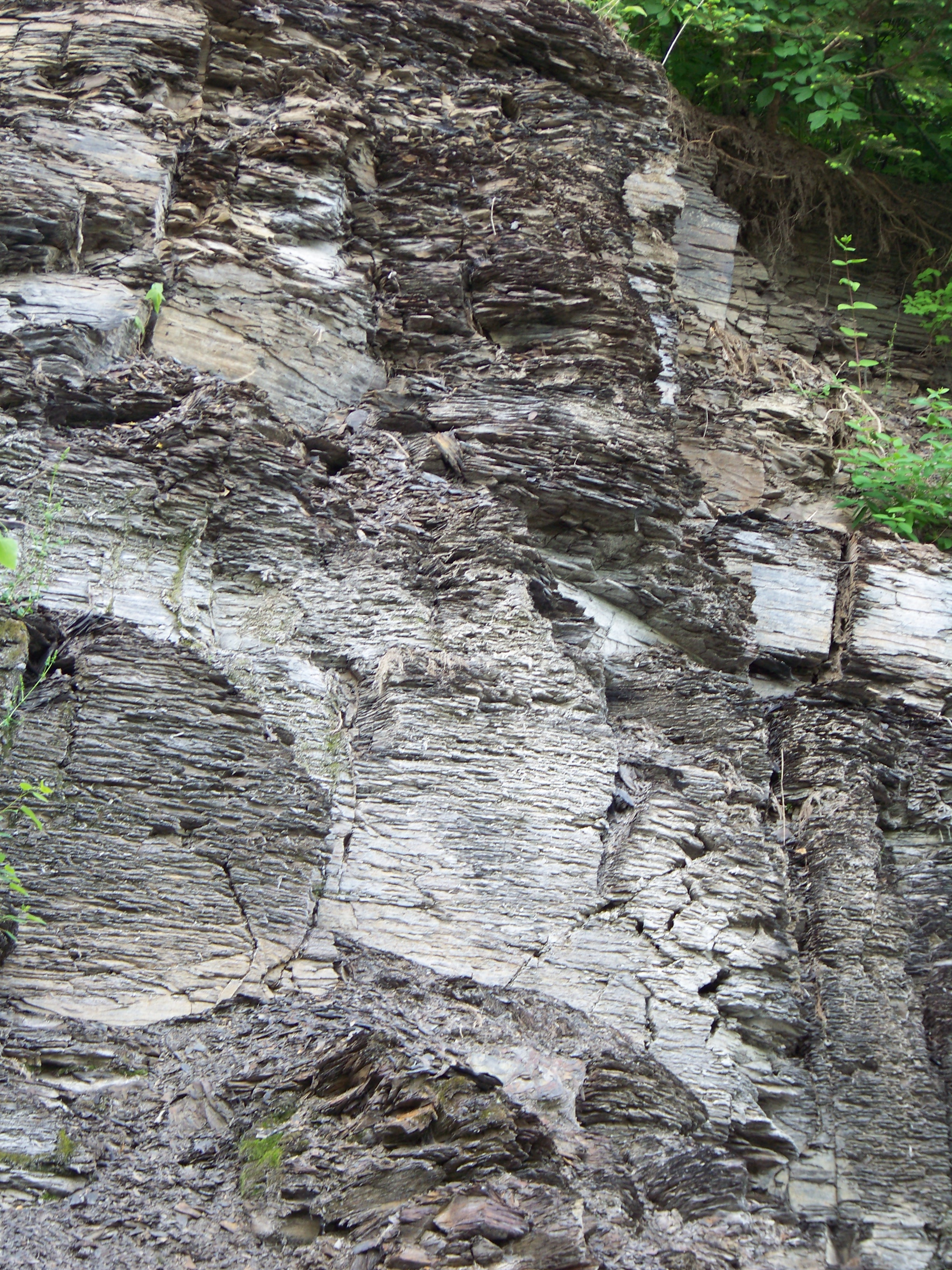
- Marcellus shale exposure above Marcellus, N.Y. The vertical joints create sheer cliff faces.
- Type: Geological formation
- Unit of: Hamilton Group
- Sub-units: See: Named members
- Underlies: Mahantango Formation and Skaneatales Formation/Stafford Lime Mbr
- Overlies: Huntersville Chert, Needmore Shale, and Onondaga Formation
- Thickness: up to 900 feet (270 m)

Lithology
- Primary: Shale
- Other: Slate, limestone, sandstone, tuff

Location
- Region: Appalachian Basin of eastern North America
- Extent: 600 miles (970 km)

Type section
- Named for: Marcellus, New York
- Named by: James Hall, 1839

The Marcellus Formation or the Marcellus Shale is a Middle Devonian age unit of sedimentary rock found in eastern North America. Named for a distinctive outcrop near the village of Marcellus, New York, it extends throughout much of the Appalachian Basin.

The unit name usage by the U.S. Geological Survey (USGS) includes Marcellus Shale and Marcellus Formation. The term "Marcellus Shale" is the preferred name throughout most of the Appalachian region, although the term "Marcellus Formation" is also acceptable within the State of Pennsylvania. The unit was first described and named as the "Marcellus shales" by J. Hall in 1839.

== Description ==
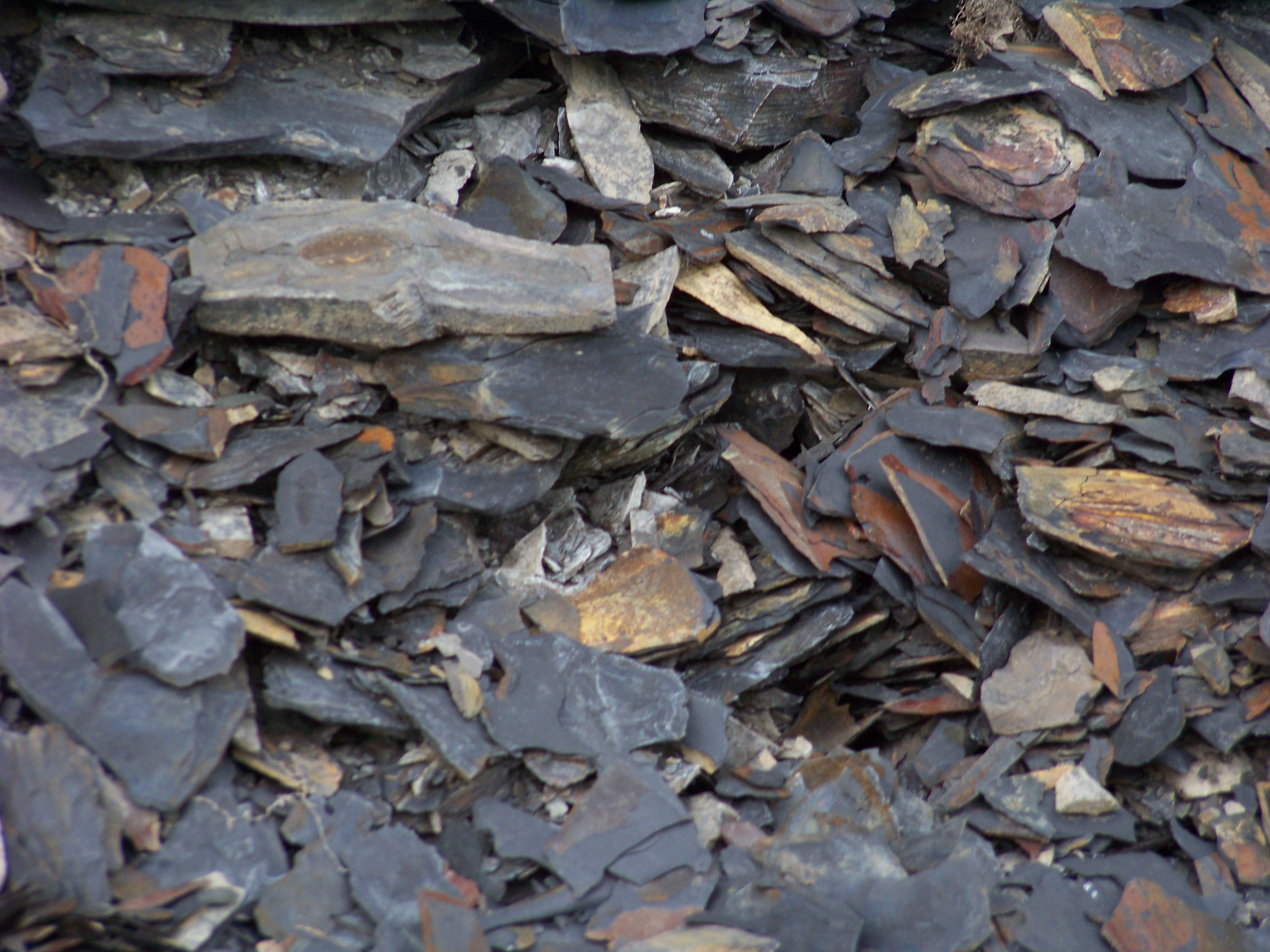
Fragments below exposure of fissile Marcellus black shale at Marcellus, N.Y.

The Marcellus consists predominantly of black shale and a few limestone beds and concentrations of iron pyrite (FeS_{2}) and siderite (FeCO_{3}). Like most shales, it tends to split easily along the bedding plane, a property known as fissility. Lighter colored shales in the upper portion of the formation tend to split into small thin-edged fragments after exposure. These fragments may have rust stains from exposure of pyrite to air, and tiny gypsum (CaSO_{4}·2H_{2}O) crystals from the reaction between pyrite and limestone particles. Fresh exposures of the pyriteiferous shale may develop the secondary mineralization of orange limonite (FeO(OH)·nH_{2}O), and the pale yellow efflorescence or bloom of sulfur, associated with acid rock drainage.

Pyrite is especially abundant near the base, and the upper contacts of limestones, but framboidal microcrystals and euhedral crystals of pyrite occur throughout the organic-rich deposits. The Marcellus also contains uranium, and the radioactive decay of the uranium-238 (^{238}U) makes it a source rock for radioactive radon gas (^{222}Rn).

Measured total organic content of the Marcellus ranges from less than 1% in eastern New York, to over 11% in the central part of the state, and the shale may contain enough carbon to support combustion. The more organic-rich black shales can be bituminous, but are too old to contain bituminous coal formed from land plants. In petroleum geology, these black shales are an important source rock that filled conventional petroleum reservoirs in overlying formations, are an unconventional shale gas reservoir, and are an impermeable seal that traps underlying conventional natural gas reservoirs. To the west the formation may produce liquid petroleum; further north heating during deeper burial more than 240 million years ago cracked this oil into gas.

== Geographic extent ==
The Marcellus is found throughout the Allegheny Plateau region of the northern Appalachian Basin of North America. In the United States, the Marcellus Shale runs across the Southern Tier and Finger Lakes regions of New York, in northern and western Pennsylvania, eastern Ohio, through western Maryland, and throughout most of West Virginia extending across the state line into extreme western Virginia. The Marcellus bedrock in eastern Pennsylvania extends across the Delaware River into extreme western New Jersey. It also exists in the subsurface of a small portion of Kentucky and Tennessee. Below Lake Erie, it can be found crossing the border into Canada, where it stretches between Port Stanley and Long Point to St. Thomas in southern Ontario.

=== Outcrops in New York ===
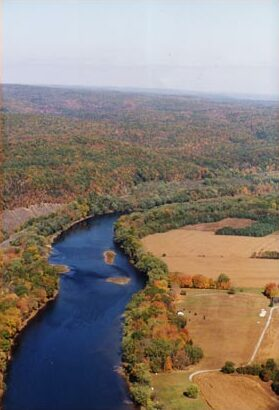
Delaware River above Walpack Bend, where it leaves the buried valley eroded from Marcellus Shale bedrock

The Marcellus appears in outcrops along the northern margin of the formation in central New York. There, the two joint planes in the Marcellus are nearly at right angles, each making cracks in the formation that run perpendicular to the bedding plane, which lies almost level. These joints form smooth nearly vertical cliffs, and the intersecting joint planes form projecting corners in the rock faces. Once exposed, the weathered faces lose most of their organic carbon, turning from black or dark gray to a lighter shade of gray.

Outcrops of the Marcellus can contain very small beds that resemble coal. The New York outcrops, and others further south in Pennsylvania and New Jersey, were extensively excavated in the early 19th century, sometimes at great expense, in the false hope of finding minable coal seams. In Perry County, Pennsylvania along the Juniata River the false coal beds become up to .3 m (1 ft) thick, but they did not produce a valuable fuel, despite the considerable effort expended to mine it from the surrounding hills. Seaweed and marine plants probably formed the false coal. True coal is formed from terrestrial plants, which only began to appear in Marcellus and later fossils.

Close proximity to the surface of Marcellus bedrock south of the New York outcrops makes an east–west band running through the city of Syracuse a high-risk area for radon as an indoor air pollutant. From the surface exposures along the northern and eastern margins, the formation descends to depths of over 2,700 m (8,900 ft) below the surface in southern Pennsylvania.

== Geomorphological expression ==
Upturned beds are exposed in sections of the folded Ridge-and-Valley Appalachians, including exposures on the flanks and axis of the Broad Top Synclinorium in south central Pennsylvania. Exposed beds are nearly horizontal on the Allegheny Plateau, but upturned to form slightly overturned beds found along the Allegheny Front. From Wind Gap, Pennsylvania heading south, the dip of the beds steepens, becoming vertical at Bowmanstown on the Lehigh River. Nearby, in the Lehigh Gap area of Pennsylvania, the Marcellus is extensively faulted, and the beds are steeply overturned, with a reverse dip angle of up to 40° south.

The Marcellus Shale and the fine-grained shales near the middle of the Mahantango Formation are classified by geologists as slope-formers. Marcellus and Mahantango shale beds dipping at 60° to 75° to the west form the west facing slopes of Tonoloway Ridge on the west flank of the Cacapon Mountain anticline in the Eastern Panhandle of West Virginia. On the eastern limb of this anticline, beds of these shales dipping to the east at a shallower angle also form the steep slopes on the east side of Warm Springs Ridge.

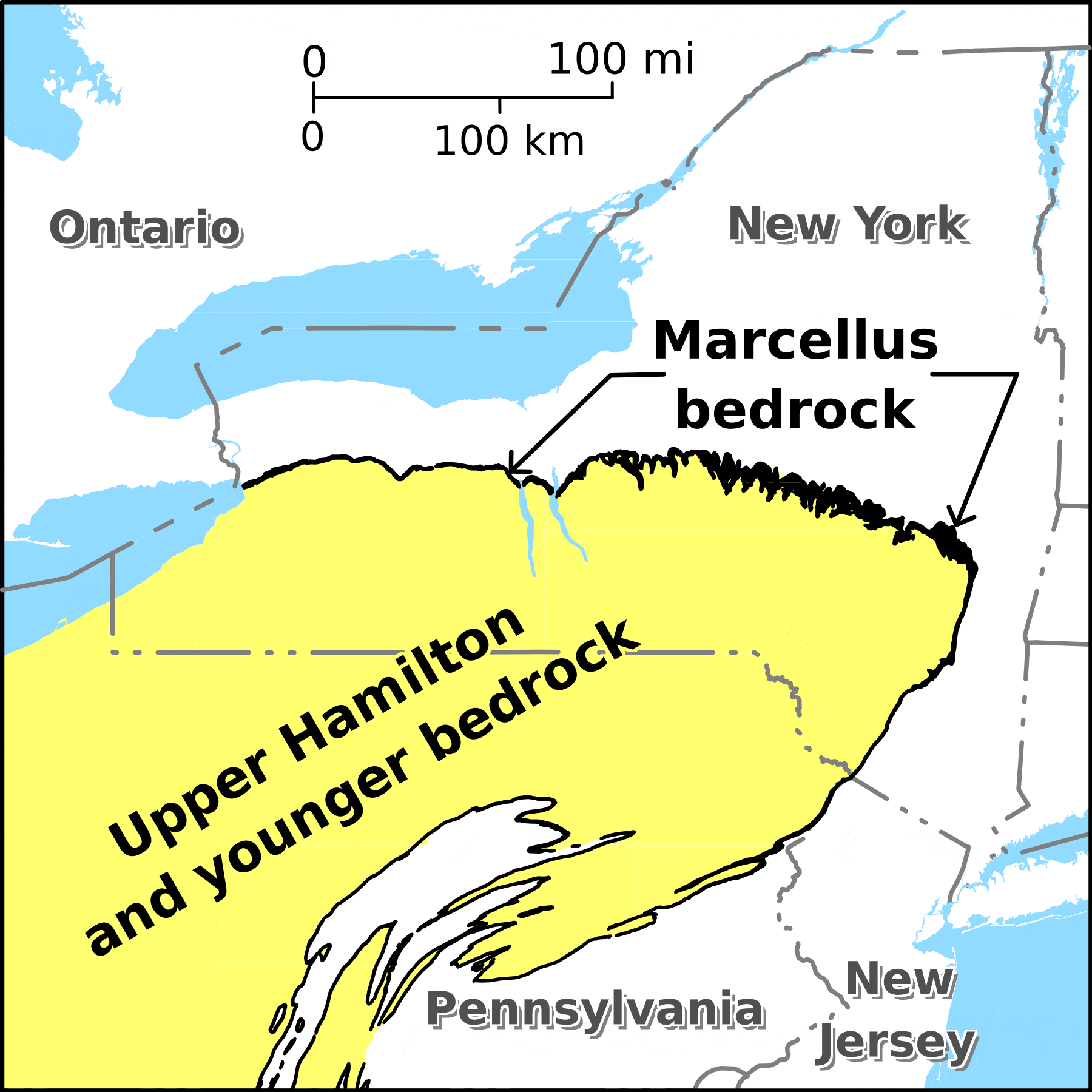
Bedrock geological map showing Marcellus bedrock in New York and Pennsylvania

The Marcellus is easily eroded, and is also found underlying low areas between some Appalachian ridges, forming linear valleys of moderate relief. These bedrock surfaces are typically covered with colluvium from erosion of stratigraphically higher and more erosion-resistant strata that form the surrounding higher ground. The soils formed from the Marcellus and the overlying Hamilton shales are deep, free of stones, and well suited for agriculture. Sampling of soil formed on the Marcellus bedrock showed the dominant mineralogy consisted of quartz, illite, montmorillonite, muscovite, and biotite, with phases of todorokite and trona appearing at depths closer to the bedrock.

Upturned beds of the soft shale also capture streams and rivers with relatively straight segments in strike valleys such as the Aquashicola Creek and McMichael Creek at the foot of The Poconos, and the long, straight section of the Lost River in West Virginia. Below Port Jervis, New York, the Walpack Ridge deflects the Delaware River into the Minisink Valley, where it follows the southwest strike of the eroded Marcellus beds along the Pennsylvania – New Jersey state line for 40 km (25 mi) to the end of the ridge at Walpack Bend in the Delaware Water Gap National Recreation Area. The Minisink is a buried valley where the Delaware flows in a bed of glacial till that buried the eroded Marcellus bedrock during the last glacial period. This buried valley continues along the strike of the Marcellus southwest from the bend through Stroudsburg, Pennsylvania, and northeast from Port Jervis toward the Hudson River, along the route of the Delaware and Hudson Canal.

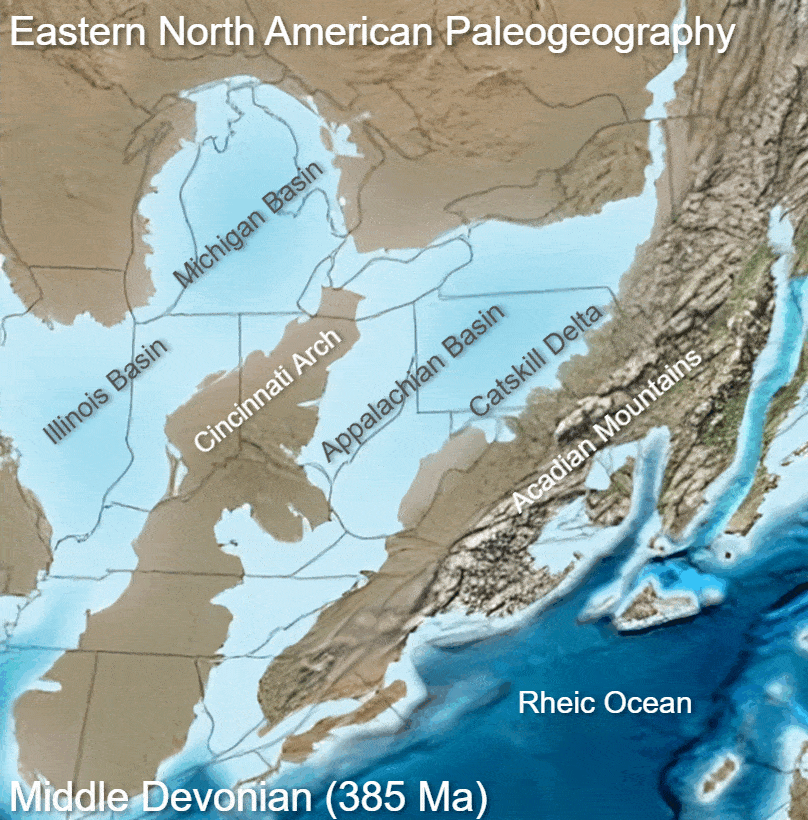
Paleogeographic reconstruction of the Appalachian Basin area during deposition of the Marcellus

== Stratigraphy ==
Stratigraphically, the Marcellus is the lowest unit of the Devonian age Hamilton Group, and is divided into several sub-units. In the first Pennsylvania Geological Survey, begun in 1836, Henry Darwin Rogers classified the Marcellus as the "Cadent Lower Black Slate" which he numbered "No. VIII b." In the first New York State Geological Survey, also begun that year, James Hall established the term "Marcellus Shale" in his 1839 report titled "Marcellus Shales in Seneca County." Professor Hall also argued in 1839 against formulating geological names based on observed characteristics that may vary from place to place or need revision in the future, and in favor of location-based nomenclature where "the rock or group will receive its name from the place where it is best developed." His arguments proved persuasive, and the location-based name for this, and many of the other group names he published based on exposures in New York, were adopted in the second Pennsylvania survey, and are now widely accepted.

=== Overlying units ===
In the first New York survey, the Marcellus Shale was placed below the Hamilton Group at the base of the Erie division of the New York system, but this taxonomy is obsolete.

In current practice, the Marcellus Shale (abbr. Dm or Dms) is classified as the basal unit of the Hamilton Group (Dh), lying beneath the Mahantango Formation (Dmh) member of this group in Pennsylvania and Maryland. In New York, the Mahantango, also of Middle Devonian age, is further divided. There the Marcellus is separated from the overlying Skaneateles Formation, a more clastic and fossiliferous dark shale, by the thin Stafford or Mottville Limestone bed.

In West Virginia, the Marcellus may be separated from the brown shales of the Mahantango by occasional sandstone beds and concretions, or it may lie directly below the younger Late Devonian Harrel Formation (or its lateral equivalents) because of a disconformity, which represents a gap in the geological record due to a period of erosion or non-deposition. In eastern Ohio the Hamilton Group also lies disconformably beneath the Rhinestreet Shale Member of the West Falls Formation, another transgressive black shale tongue with similar characteristics to the Marcellus.

=== Underlying units ===
The Marcellus Shale is typically found deposited on the limestone of the Onondaga Formation (Don), which extends down to the end of the Early Devonian period. The contact between them may be sharp, gradational, or erosional. In southwestern Ontario, Canada, north of Lake Erie, the Marcellus overlies the Dundee Formation, a lateral equivalent of the Onondaga. In Pennsylvania, the Marcellus forms a sharp conformable contact with the Onondaga's Selinsgrove Limestone member. A thin pyrite-carbonate bed is also found at the base of the Marcellus black shale in the exposures of south central Pennsylvania, above a thin calcerous green shale bed, which lies upon the Onondaga limestone.

In eastern New York, the contact between the Marcellus and Onondaga (where present) is gradational. In western New York, the Union Springs member of the Marcellus conformably overlies the Seneca member of the Onondaga Limestone, or the stratigraphically higher Cherry Valley Limestone member may rest directly and unconformably upon the Onondaga in the absence of the Union Springs shale. The local disappearance of units of the Onondaga suggests that its upper contact with the Marcellus can be erosional. In Erie County in western New York, both the upper and lower contact of the Marcellus are eroded away.

In eastern West Virginia the Marcellus overlies the Onesquethaw Group, consisting of the dark gray or green, calcitic, mostly nonfissil Needmore Shale, which grades westward into the Huntersville Chert. To the south and west, the Hamilton Group grades laterally into the Millboro Shale formation in southern West Virginia and Virginia, which grades into the lower part of the Chattanooga Shale of Tennessee.

The Milboro is gradational with the underlying Needmore Formation shale. South of the Mason–Dixon line, due to the difficulty in differentiating the Millboro and Needmore shales with the limited exposures available, and initial uncertainty in correlation with the New York survey, they were mapped as the Romney Formation, a unit containing all the Middle Devonian strata, named for an exposure at Romney, West Virginia. The correlations were established by 1916 through tracing the New York exposures across Pennsylvania and Maryland into West Virginia, so under the principle of scientific priority, the Romney classification is now obsolete; but its Marcellus and underlying Needmore shale members are still found grouped in an undifferentiated map unit (Dmn).

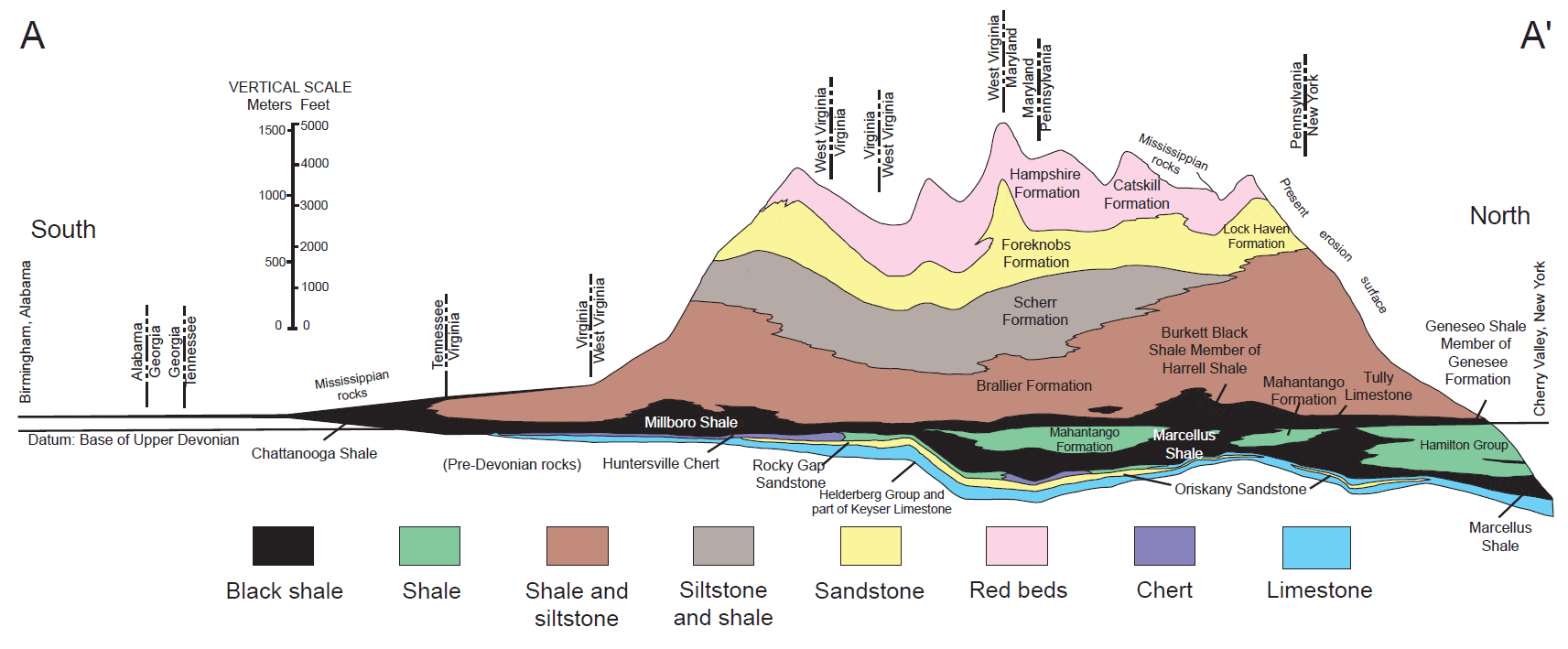
Geologic cross section of upper to middle Devonian strata from Cherry Valley, New York southwest across the Allegheny Plateau and then along the Ridge-and-Valley Appalachians to Tennessee. Note the Marcellus grades up to the Milboro and Chattanooga black shales.

==== Tioga ash beds ====
Tioga metabentonite or K-bentonite–stratigraphic unit about .6 m (2 ft) thick that consists of several discrete, relatively thin volcanic ash falls–is also included at the base of the Marcellus in eastern Pennsylvania. In 1843 it was described without being named by Hall, and more than 100 years passed before it was eventually named for the natural gas field in Tioga County, Pennsylvania, where it was encountered when drilling gas wells. It is a regional stratigraphic marker, used by geologists to identify the Marcellus, and correlate laterally equivalent strata. Difficulty in correctly identifying the more than 80 different ash falls during the Devonian period, collected in 15 or more beds, has also led to many miscorrelations.

From Virginia to New York the Tioga is widely distributed, running across the central and northern parts of the Appalachian basin, an areal extent exceeding 265,000 km^{2} (102,000 sq mi). Explosive eruptions associated with the Acadian orogeny originating near present-day central Virginia released the ash into the atmosphere. It was dispersed across the Appalachian, Michigan, and Illinois Basins by the southern trade winds, because this area was in the southern hemisphere during the Devonian period. The volcanic origin of the ash is evidenced by its distinctive mineralogy–the ash was deposited directly upon the water, so its angular quartz grains differ from the clastic sediments rounded through the erosion process that carries them to the sea. As the volcanic ash settled to the bottom, it was admixed with these terrigenous components, producing a distinctive lithology in the sedimentary rock.

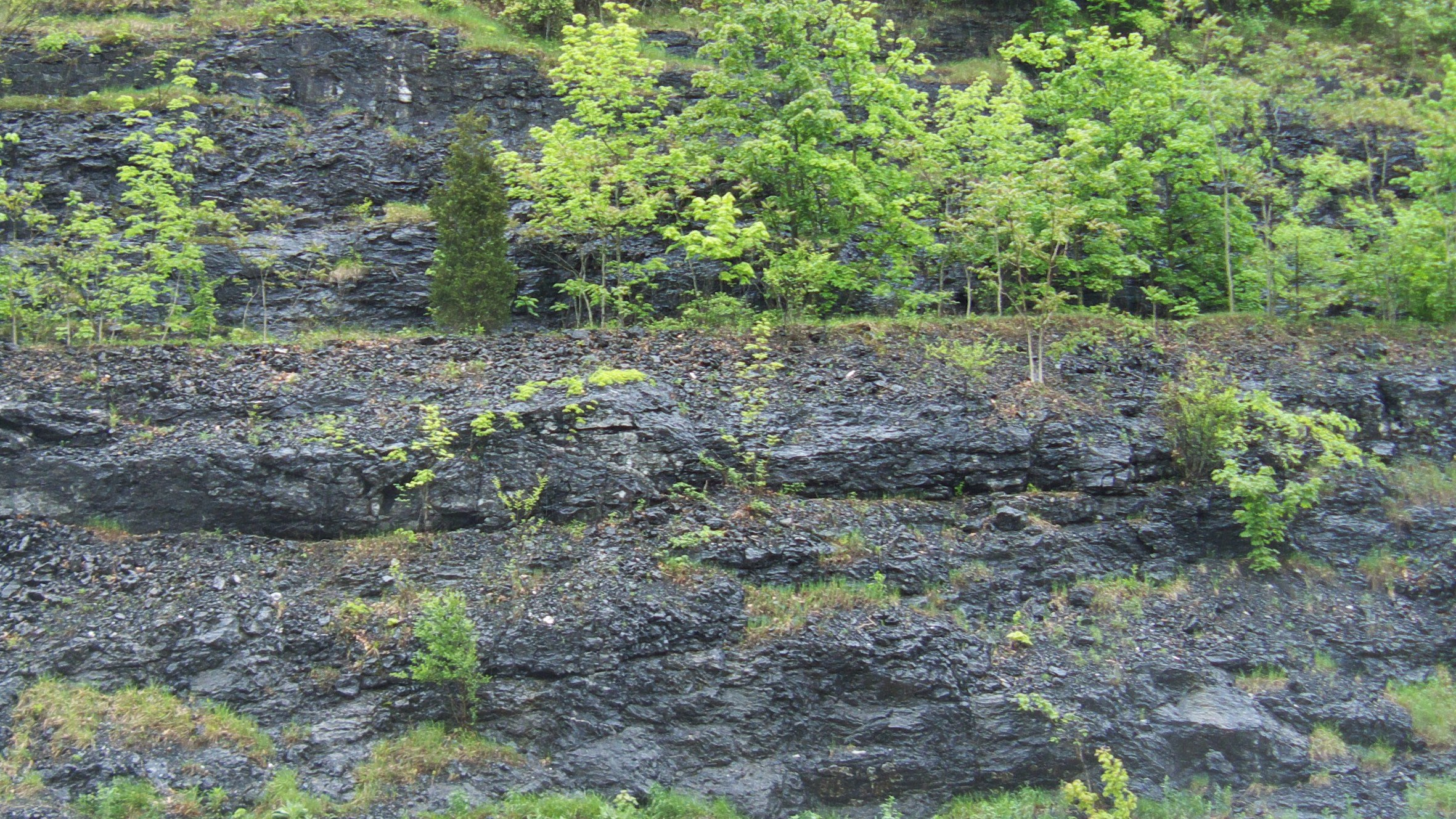
Marcellus exposure along Interstate 80 in eastern Pennsylvania where the formation is thickest.

The Tioga may appear in the formation as a gray, brown, black, or olive bed, or parting, consisting of coarse crystal tuff or tuffaceous shale, thinly laminated, with sand-sized mica flakes. The Tioga ash bed zone consists of eight ash beds labeled according to their stratigraphic order from A (oldest) to H (youngest), and another bed known as the Tioga middle coarse zone. Its basal beds are found within the uppermost beds of the Onondaga Limestone or Needmore Shale, and the uppermost ash bed within the lowermost part of the Marcellus or Millboro Shale. In western New York state, the Tioga Ash Bed B marks the boundary between the Moorehouse and Seneca Members of the Onondaga Formation, but in the central part of the state, and the southern part of the basin, the ash beds are actually in the Marcellus. This indicates that deposition of the Marcellus there began earlier, since the ash beds represent a single epoch in geologic time.

=== Thickness ===
Maximum thickness of the Marcellus ranges from 270 m (890 ft) in New Jersey, to 12 m (40 ft) in Canada. In West Virginia, the Marcellus Shale is as much as 60 m (200 ft) thick. In extreme eastern Pennsylvania, it is 240 m (790 ft) thick, thinning to the west, becoming only 15 m (49 ft) thick along the Ohio River, and only a few feet in Licking County, Ohio. The thinning, or stratigraphic convergence, from east to west is caused by decreasing grain size in the clastic deposits, which entered the basin from the east. The beds finally "pinch out" westward because deposition was limited by the Cincinnati Arch, the bulge that formed the west shore of the basin. Where the formation is relatively thick, it is divided into several members, and as the formation continues to thicken to the east, these members are further divided. Some workers chose to classify the Marcellus as a subgroup, and classify some of the members as separate formations.

Members of the Marcellus Formation from West to East in New York
Buffalo	Rochester	Syracuse	Utica	Albany
Oatka Creek shale		Cardiff dark gray shale	Pecksport shale	(Mt. Marion Fm.)
Oatka Creek shale		Cardiff dark gray shale	Solsville shale and sandstone	
Oatka Creek shale		Cardiff dark gray shale	Bridgewater shale	Otsego
Oatka Creek shale		Chittenango black shale		Berne
Cherry Valley limestone				Stony Hollow shale & limestone
(Seneca Mb.) (Onondaga Fm.)	Union Springs shale and limestone			Stony Hollow shale & limestone
(Seneca Mb.) (Onondaga Fm.)	(Onondaga Fm.)		Union Springs shale and limestone	

Table showing approximate correlation between Marcellus Formation
named members from west to east across central New York state.

=== Named members ===
A local Purcell limestone member, 15 to 30 m (49 to 98 ft) of inter-bedded calcitic shale and limestone, divides the Marcellus in eastern Pennsylvania. The Purcell is stratigraphically equivalent to the Cherry Valley Limestone member in New York, a bioclastic packstone, consisting of skeletal limestones, with shaly intervals between its lower massive limestone layer, thick nodular limestone/marlstone, and upper limestone layer. Other named members include the Bakoven Shale, Cardiff Shale, Chittenango shale, Solsville sandstone, Union Springs shale and limestone, and Stony Hollow shale and limestone. The Union Springs, Cherry Valley, and Oatka Creek merge beneath Lake Erie, into the Bell Shale, Rockport Quarry Limestone, and Arkona Shale of Ontario.

The Union Springs is an organic-rich, pyritiferous, thinly bedded, blackish gray to black shale with mudstone concretionary layers, and thin silt bands at the bottom. To the east, it becomes the Bakoven Member, a darker, less organic shale with fewer limestone layers. To the west the Union Springs beds thin, with its upper limestones merging with the overlying calcareous Cherry Valley Member. A regional unconformity appears in western New York, as the Union Springs lenses in and out, and then reappears in northwest Pennsylvania and northeast Ohio between the Onondaga and Cherry Valley.

In Western and central New York, the uppermost member is the dark grey to black organic-rich Oatka Creek shale. Unlike the other Devonian shales in this region, the gray shale at the top of the Oatka Creek thickens gradually to the west, as well as the east, where it divides into the Cardiff member lying above the Chittenango member in central New York. Organic-rich, fissile, sooty black shales make up the Chittenango Member. At the base of the Chittenango, above the Bierne Member shale, lies the Halihan Hill Bed, a highly bioturbated bioclastic limestone.

Further east, the homogeneous Cardiff divides into the Bridgewater, Solsville, and Pecksport shale members, from base to top. The Bridgewater is a fissile dark silty shale with relatively rare fossils. A thin concretionary zone lies above, then the Solsville grades from a gray calcareous shale, to sandy siltstones and fine sandstones at the top, with the gray shale of the Pecksport shale and siltstone overlying it.

In south central Pennsylvania, the Marcellus is mapped with three members, from top to base: The Mahanoy Member (Dmm), a dark gray to grayish black silty shale and siltstone; the Turkey Ridge Member (Dmt), an olive to dark-gray fine to medium grained sandstone; and the Shamokin Member (Dms), a dark gray to grayish black fissile carbonaceous shale that is calcareous in places near the base. The Turkey Ridge is commonly mapped in the Mahantango Formation, or included in the Montebello Formation (Dmot), and only the Shamokin correlates with the Marcellus on adjacent map sheets. In extreme eastern Pennsylvania, the Broadhead Creek member, a dark gray silty shale with dark gray shaly limestone concretions, appears above the Stony Hollow and Union Springs, in a layer up to 275 m (902 ft) thick.

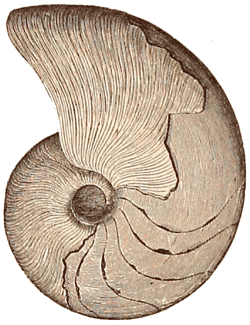
Illustration of a Cephalopod (Goniatites vanuxemi) fossil from the Marcellus Formation.

== Fossils ==
There are relatively sparse inclusions of fossilized marine fauna found in the Marcellus, but these fossils are still important to paleontology. For example, the Marcellus contains the oldest known diverse collection of thin-shelled mollusks still having well preserved shell microstructure. It is also where goniatites, an extinct shelled swimmer similar to a squid, make their first appearance in the fossil record. Life on land also enters the fossil record in the Marcellus, with the trunks of branchless conifer trees that floated out to sea to be preserved in the black shale.

Marcellus fossils include specimens of the large clam-like brachiopod Spinocyrtia. External molds of crinoids, plant-like animals related to starfish also known as "sea lilies," are found in the formation, with the molds partially filled with limonite; brachiopod and bivalve (clam) molds have also been found in the shale. Small conical tentaculitids are commonly found in the Chittenango Member. The Halihan Hill bed contains styliolinids and macrofauna including brachiopods, coral-like bryozoans, small bivalves and gastropods (snails), incorporated after the faunal turnover when Emsian and Eifelian Schoharie/Onondaga fauna were replaced by the Givetian Hamilton fauna.

The Solsville member contains well preserved bivalves, gastropods, and brachiopods. These shellfish lived in the benthic zone at the bottom of marginal marine to open marine environments that existed west of the ancient Catskill Delta. The fossil record in this member shows the base was dominated by deposit feeders, while the upper layers were dominated by filter feeders. This can be correlated to the lithology: the finer sediments of the shales at the base of this member would contain abundant adherent organic matter for deposit feeders, but would tend to foul the gills of filter feeders when suspended; the coarser sediments of the sandstones at the top would have contained less organic matter to support deposit feeders. Below the Solsville, at the base of the Otsego in eastern New York, a coral bed is found; another coral bed can be seen at the top of the Marcellus near Berne, New York.

A diverse, eel-like conodont fauna occurs in the limestone of the Cherry Valley Member, which is also known for its rich nautiloid and goniatite cephalopod fauna. Originally named the Goniatite Limestone, it produces their fossilized remains with shells that can be larger than .3 m (1 ft) across. It also contains the "Cephalopod Graveyard" in the Schoharie Valley of eastern New York, an unusual accumulation of abundant coiled and straight shells of several types of large adult cephalopods. This bed lacks juvenile fossils, indicating that if their behavior was similar to modern squid, this may have been an area where these Devonian cephalopods reproduced and died. This stratigraphic interval also provides an excellent example of incursion epiboles, which are sudden appearances and disappearances of fossil taxa in relatively thin sections of the rock unit. In the Cherry Valley, the taxa do not reoccur; instead each thin concretionary limestone bed contains different species of goniatites. The Cherry Valley and Union Springs also contain well-preserved Anarcestida.

== Age ==
On the geological timescale, the Marcellus occurs in the Middle Devonian epoch, of the Devonian period, in the Paleozoic era, of the Phanerozoic eon. Radiometric dating of a Marcellus sample from Pennsylvania placed its age at 384 million years old, and a sample from the bentonite at the top of the Onondaga at 390 ± 0.5 million years old.

Relative age dating of the Marcellus places its formation in the Cazenovia subdivision of the Givetian faunal stage, or 391.9 to 383.7 million years ago (Ma). The Union Springs member, at the base of the Marcellus in New York, has been dated to the end of the Eifelian, the stage which immediately preceded the Givetian. Anoxic dark shales in the formation mark the Kačák Event, a late-Eifelian-stage marine anoxic event also associated with an extinction event. In 2012, Read and Erikson also depicted the formation as Eifelian.

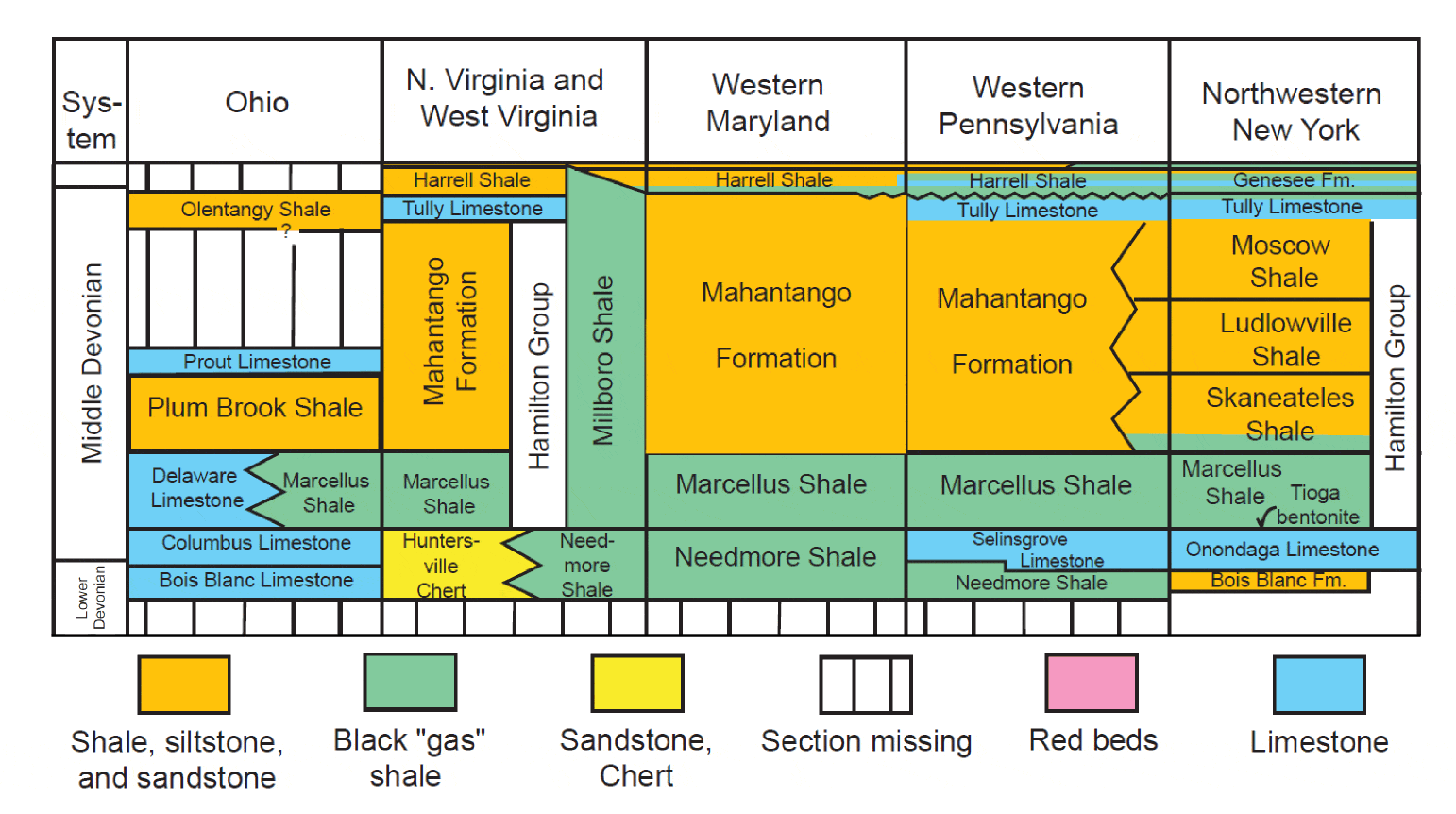
Generalized stratigraphic nomenclature for the Middle Devonian strata in the Appalachian Basin.

== Interpretation of depositional environment ==
Although black shale is the dominant lithology, it also contains lighter shales and interbedded limestone layers due to sea level variation during its deposition almost 400 million years ago. The black shale was deposited in relatively deep water devoid of oxygen, and is only sparsely fossiliferous. Most fossils are contained in the limestone members, and the fossil record in these layers provides important paleontological insights on faunal turnovers.

Early in the Acadian orogeny, as the Acadian Mountains were rising up, the black and gray shales of the Hamilton Group began accumulating as erosion of the mountains deposited terrigenous sediments from the land into the sea. The Marcellus Shale was formed from the very first deposits in a relatively deep, sediment- and oxygen-starved (anoxic), trough that formed parallel to the mountain chain. These clastic fragments of rock were carried in braided streams to the ancient Catskill Delta, a river delta probably similar to the present day Niger Delta of Africa.

Smaller particles remained suspended longer in this epeiric sea, flowing offshore as turbidites in a slow but persistent underwater avalanche. They finally came to rest at the bottom of the Acadian foredeep in the Appalachian Basin, hundreds of meters from shore, at depths that may have been 150 m (490 ft) or more beneath the surface. Alternatively, the basin may have been as shallow as 50 m (160 ft) or less, if the warm water was sufficiently stratified so that oxygen rich surface water did not mix with the anoxic bottom water. The Marcellus deposition produced a transgressive black shale, because it was deposited in deepening conditions when the basin floor dropped as the mountains rose up.

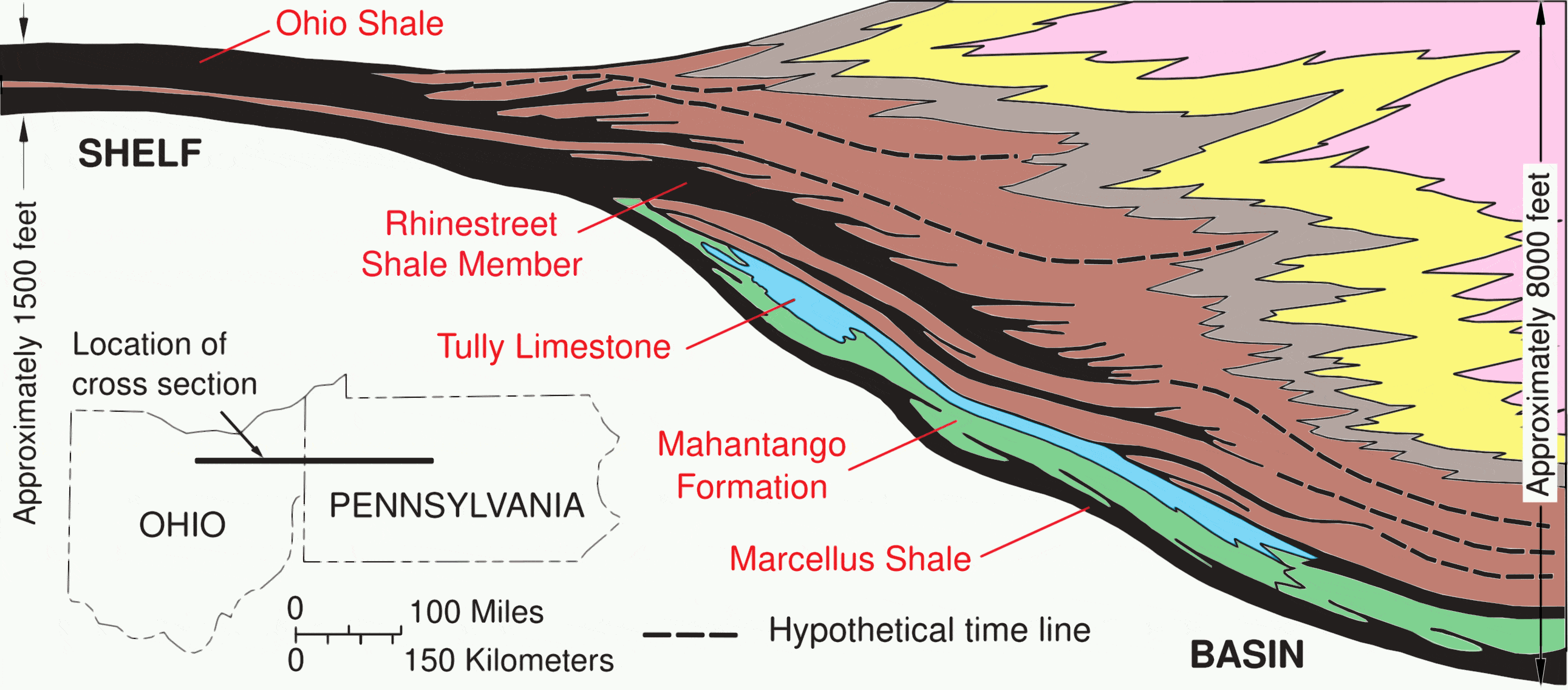
Generalized geologic cross section of Catskill Delta magnafacies across western Pennsylvania and eastern Ohio. Clastic deposits entered the Appalachian Basin from the east, where the resulting sedimentary rock is thickest.

The dark shale facies of the Marcellus were formed from flysch, a fine mud deposited in deep water; the deepening sea that deposited the Marcellus cut off the supply of carbonates that form limestone and the fine-grained flysch sediments buried the Onondaga limestone beds. Organic matter, probably dominated by plankton, also settled to the bottom, but the normal aerobic decay process was inhibited in the anaerobic environment thereby preserving the organic carbon. Uranium was also incorporated in these organic muds syndepositionally, meaning it was deposited at the same time, rather than being introduced to the formation later. The organic matter scavenged trace elements from the seawater, including the redox-sensitive elements uranium, rhenium, molybdenum, osmium, chromium, and selenium.

The Marcellus was deposited during the development of land plants, when atmospheric oxygen was increasing, resulting in a reduction of carbon dioxide in the atmosphere, and the seawater where it was deposited. Named members of the Marcellus reflect two composite depositional sequences, with a general coarsening upward cycle that continues into the base of the overlying Mahantango Formation. The interbedding of lighter shale and limestone members is attributed to relatively short-term oscillations in basin depth. Later deep water depositional sequences formed the overlying Brallier Formation and Harrell Formation.

== Economic resources ==
=== Natural gas ===
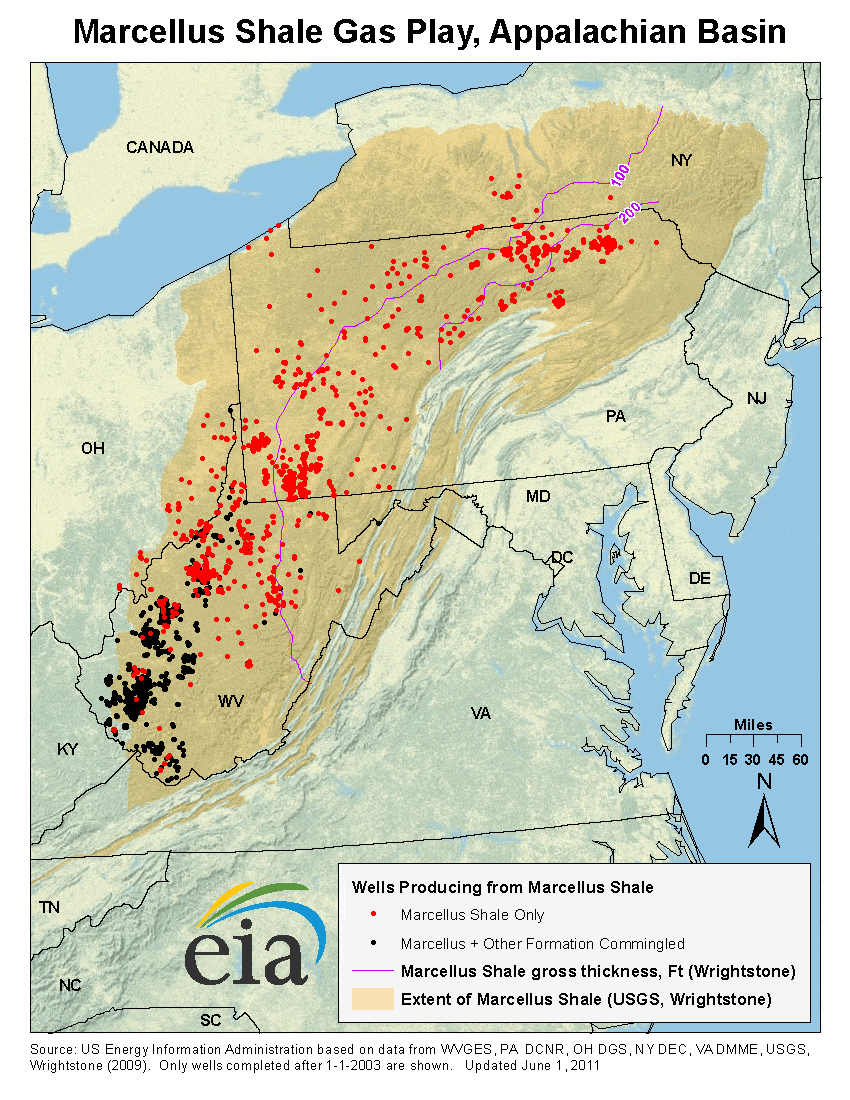
Producing gas wells in the Marcellus Shale gas play

The shale contains largely untapped natural gas reserves, and its proximity to the high-demand markets along the East Coast of the United States makes it an attractive target for energy development and export.

The Marcellus natural gas trend, which encompasses 104,000 square miles and stretches across Pennsylvania and West Virginia, and into southeast Ohio and upstate New York, is the largest source of natural gas in the United States, and production was still growing rapidly in 2013. The Marcellus is an example of shale gas, natural gas trapped in low-permeability shale, and requires the well completion method of hydraulic fracturing to allow the gas to flow to the well bore. The surge in drilling activity in the Marcellus Shale since 2008 has generated both economic benefits and environmental concerns—and thus, considerable controversy.

=== Iron ===
The black shales also contain iron ore that was used in the early economic development of the region, and uranium and pyrite which are environmental hazards. At the base of the Marcellus, in the pyrite-carbonate bed between the carbonaceous black shale and a green calcareous shale bed, pyrite, carbonate, and groundwater reacted to form gossan iron oxide and gypsum. As far as the ground water necessary for the conversion could penetrate, the pyrite-carbonate was converted to a usable brown hematite iron ore along the outcrops and near the bedrock surface. The Marcellus iron ore was actively mined in south Central Pennsylvania from its discovery in the late 18th century, until it was supplanted by the rich ore beds of the Iron Range of Minnesota in the early 20th century. The ore was easily located and worked from shallow pits and shafts, but once the usable upper deposits were removed, or if a mine shaft entered the bed too far below the surface, only unusable unconverted pyritic deposits were found.

Hematite ore was converted to pig iron in charcoal-fired stone blast furnaces that were constructed throughout the Juniata River region near the workable ore deposits from the Marcellus and other formations. Iron products from this area, known as "Juniata Iron," were produced during the period between the American Revolution and the American Civil War. These blast furnaces were important to the economy of the region at the time, but the cold blast stone furnaces typically employed were inefficient, and consumed significant amounts of timber from the nearby hardwood forests, which ultimately led to their demise. A typical furnace used 2,400 kg (5,300 lb) of hematite ore and 7.3 m^{3} (200 imp bu) of charcoal to produce 910 kg (2,010 lb) of pig iron, and could produce several thousand pounds per day, which required logging more than 4,000 m^{2} (1 acre) of forest daily.

The ore from the Marcellus varied in thickness, becoming unworkably thin, and even disappearing altogether in places between the workable beds. The quality of the ore also varied, and it was not always profitable to smelt, as several furnaces built near iron ore mines in the Marcellus were abandoned before the ore and timber resources used to fuel them became scarce.

Ore found interbedded in the black slaty shale contained a relatively high proportion of carbon which was burned in the furnace, and sulfur, which produced a usable but "red-short" iron. Red-short iron has the undesirable properties of oxidizing more easily, and a tendency to crack, especially when heated to a red-hot state. In some locations in Pennsylvania the quality of the ore was quite good, with relatively deep veins containing 45% iron, and very low sulfur. In Virginia, the Marcellus ore occasionally contained zinc, which produced a characteristic green flame in the furnace as it was consumed, but deposited a hard mass of impure zinc oxide known as cadmia, which built up over time near the top of the flue, and had to be removed periodically to keep it unobstructed.

==== Iron pigments ====
Drainage that reacted with the pyrite inclusions also deposited a form of bog iron near several outcrops of the Marcellus. In the 19th century, iron ore from these deposits was used as a mineral paint pigment. After being heated in a kiln and finely ground, it was mixed with linseed oil, and used to paint exterior wood on barns, covered bridges, and railroad cars. In addition to the bog iron, at several sloped locations in eastern Pennsylvania brown hematite was found lying on the Marcellus bedrock buried beneath the soil. These deposits were also excavated and used for mineral paint during that time. A bed of hematite paint ore is also found almost directly below the Marcellus, but it is actually part of the underlying Oriskany Formation.

==== Chalybeate ====
Iron rich "ferruginous waters" emanating from chalybeate springs near the base of the Marcellus in Bedford, Pennsylvania were believed to have healing powers by Native Americans. The Bedford Springs Hotel was a mineral spa built in 1802 around a series of mineral springs, including one of these, its "iron spring". The Chalybeate Springs Hotel, built nearby in 1851 around three other mineral springs including another chalybeate spring, became a "resort for invalids". The iron-rich waters were prescribed for anemia and related complications. Both of these mineral springs contain iron in the form of dissolved iron carbonate, which gives these waters a "slightly inky taste".

=== Other uses ===
The Marcellus has also been used locally for shale aggregate and common fill, although the pyritic shales are not suitable for this purpose because of acid rock drainage and volumetric expansion. In the 19th century, this shale was used for walkways and roadways, and was considered superior "road metal" because the fine grained fragments packed together tightly, yet drained well after a rain.

The dark slaty shales may have the necessary cleavage and hardness to be worked, and were quarried for low grade roofing slate in eastern Pennsylvania during the 19th century. The slates from the Marcellus were inferior to the Martinsburg Formation slate quarried further south, and most quarries were abandoned, with the last significant operation in Lancaster County. The Marcellus black slate was also quarried in Monroe County, Pennsylvania, for school slates used by students in 19th-century rural schools.

Carbonaceous shales, such as the Marcellus, are a possible target for carbon capture and storage for mitigation of global warming. Because carbon adsorbs carbon dioxide (CO_{2}) at a greater rate than methane (CH_{4}), carbon dioxide injected into the formation for geological sequestration could also be used to recover additional natural gas in a process analogous to enhanced coal bed methane recovery, but the practical value of this theoretical technique is not yet known. Scientists believe that adsorption would allow sequestration at shallower depths than absorption in deep saline formations, which must be at least 800 m (2,600 ft) below the surface to maintain liquid CO_{2} in a supercritical state.

== Engineering issues ==
The fissile shales are also easily eroded, presenting additional civil and environmental engineering challenges.

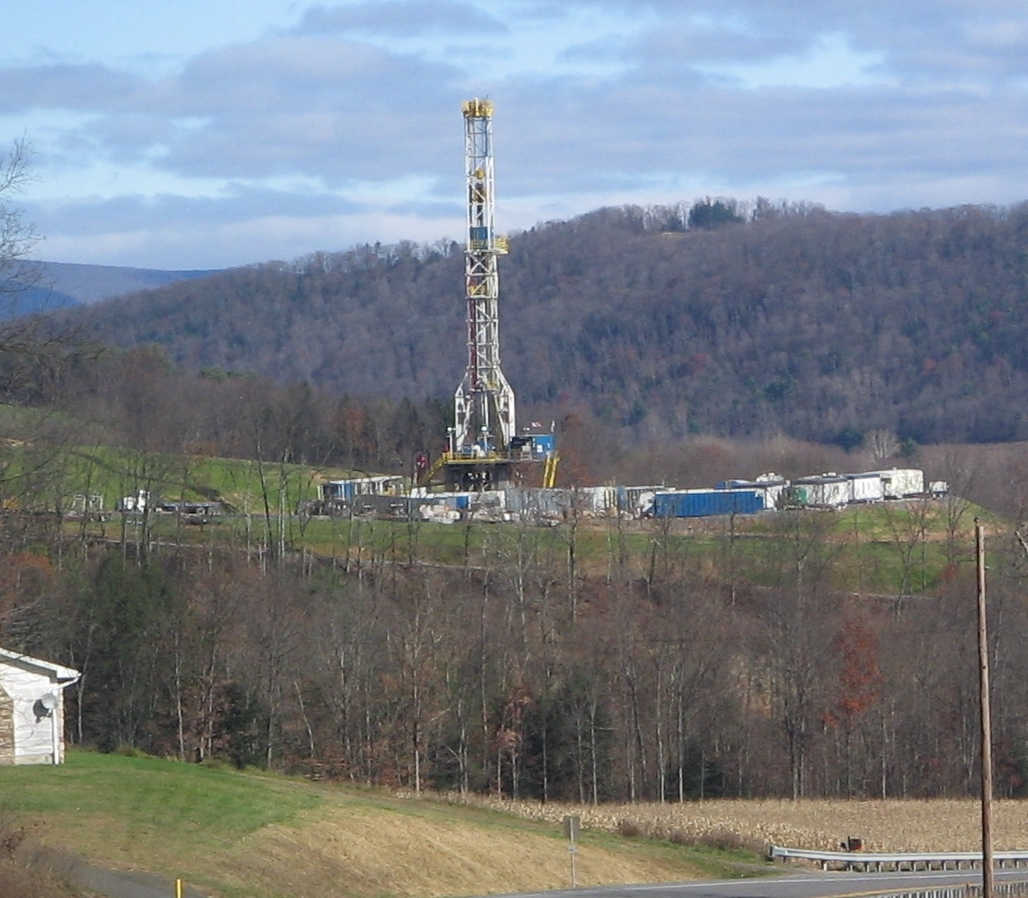
A horizontal drilling rig for natural gas in the Marcellus formation in eastern Lycoming County, Pennsylvania.

Exposures from cut and fill road construction in Virginia and Pennsylvania have resulted in localized acid rock drainage due to oxidation of the pyrite inclusions. The newly exposed shale on the cut face weathers rapidly, allowing air and water into the unexcavated rock, resulting in acidic surface runoff after precipitation events. Acidic runoff disrupts aquatic ecosystems, and highly acidic soil contaminated by this runoff will not support vegetation, which is unsightly, and can lead to problems with soil erosion.

Natural decomposition of the shale into smaller fragments can affect slope stability, necessitating shallower slopes that require more material be disturbed in cut and fill work, exacerbating the acid rock drainage problem. The cut material cannot be used as fill beneath roads and structures due to volumetric expansion, compounding the problem. The Tioga ash beds contain bentonite clay which presents a landslide hazard in the unexcavated rock as well.

Damage to structures constructed on fill consisting of pyritic Marcellus shale has been caused by expansion from sulfuric acid (H_{2}SO_{4}) runoff reacting with the calcite (CaCO_{3}) in the shale to produce gypsum (CaSO_{4}), which has double the molar volume. Other sulfate minerals that can be produced by reactions with pyrite include anhydrite, melanterite, rozenite, jarosite, and alunite. The reactions have generated a heave pressure on the order of 500 kPa (10,000 pounds per square foot), but may be able to generate four times this pressure enough to heave foundations in a 5-story building. Limestone, which is used to neutralize the acid drainage, can actually exacerbate the expansion problem by promoting sulfate–sulfate reactions that form the minerals thaumasite and ettringite, which have even higher molar volumes.

Drilling boreholes through the Hamilton Group shales in the subsurface can be problematic. The Marcellus has a relatively low density, and these shales may not be chemically compatible with some drilling fluids. The shale is relatively fragile, and may fracture under pressure, causing a problem in circulating the drilling fluid back up through the borehole known as lost circulation. The formation may also be under-pressurized, further complicating the drilling process.

== See also ==
- Geology of New Jersey
- Geology of Pennsylvania
  - List of mapped rock formations in Pennsylvania
- Geology of West Virginia
- Interactive timeline of gas production from the Marcellus Formation
- Pittsburgh Association of Petroleum Geologists
- Shale gas
- Shale gas in the United States
