= Warren Point County Wildlife Site =

Wildlife park in Plymouth, England

Coordinates: 50.424°N 4.191°W

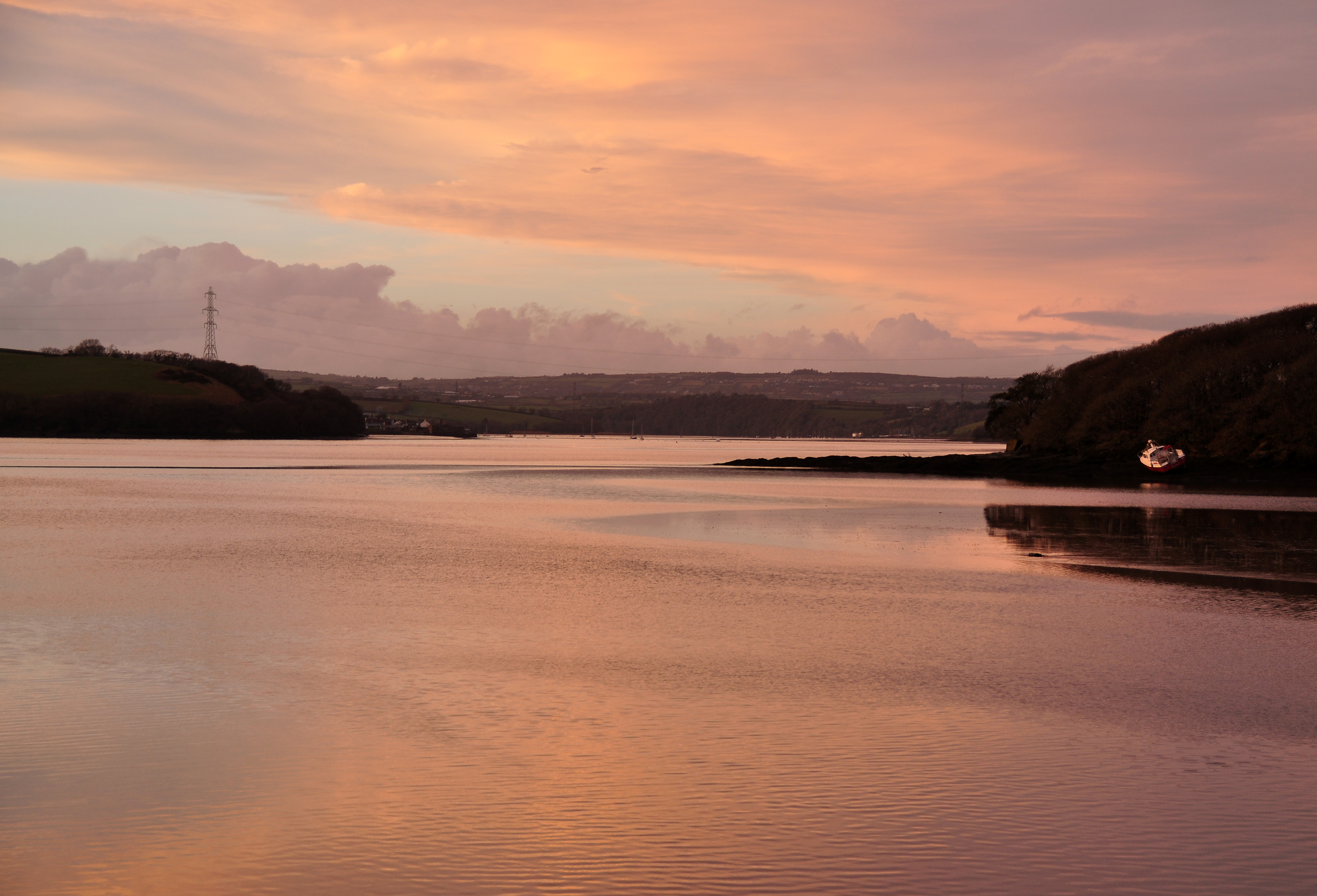
The River Tamar as seen from Warren Point

Warren Point County Wildlife Site is a wildlife park owned and managed by the city of Plymouth, Devon, England. Located in an industrial area, northwest of the centre of Plymouth, in the Ernesettle neighbourhood of the city, the 4.4-hectare (11-acre) site features, woodland, grassland, salt marsh and views of the River Tamar.

== See also ==
- Warrenpoint (disambiguation)
