= Oriskany Formation =

Geological formation in the United States

Oriskany Sandstone
- Stratigraphic range: Eifelian
- Type: Formation
- Underlies: Bois Blanc Formation, Huntersville Chert, Needmore Shale, and Onondaga Formation
- Overlies: Helderberg Group and Shriver Chert

Lithology
- Primary: Sandstone

Location
- Region: Appalachian Basin of eastern North America
- Country: United States

Type section
- Named for: Oriskany Falls, New York

The Oriskany Sandstone is a Middle Devonian age unit of sedimentary rock found in eastern North America. The type locality of the unit is located at Oriskany Falls in New York. The Oriskany Sandstone extends throughout much of the Appalachian Basin.

The unit name usage by the U.S. Geological Survey (USGS) is the Oriskany Sandstone. Butts (1940) stated that the Oriskany Sandstone "corresponds exactly with the Ridgely Sandstone" and that the rules of stratigraphic nomenclature dictate that the name Oriskany Sandstone should be applied to these strata.

== Geographic extent ==
Appalachian Basin: New York, Pennsylvania, Ohio, West Virginia, Maryland, Virginia, Kentucky

== Fossils ==
- List of fossiliferous stratigraphic units in West Virginia

== Interpretation of depositional environment ==
shallow marine

== Economic resources ==
Oil, gas, glass sand
