= Warren Point, Pennsylvania =

Coordinates: 39°43′42″N 78°04′48″W

Warren Point is a former town in the southwest corner of Warren Township, Franklin County, Pennsylvania. It was located on the north side of Licking Creek, and at the southwest end of Keefer Mountain, and approximately two miles west of Yeakle Mill.

It is present on old topographic maps (for example, Hancock Quadrangle of 1899), but is no longer labeled on later maps (for example, Cherry Run of 1951).

The Licking Creek Member of the Old Port Formation was first described a mile east of Warren Point.
