= Fissility (geology) =

Tendency of a rock to split along flat planes of weakness

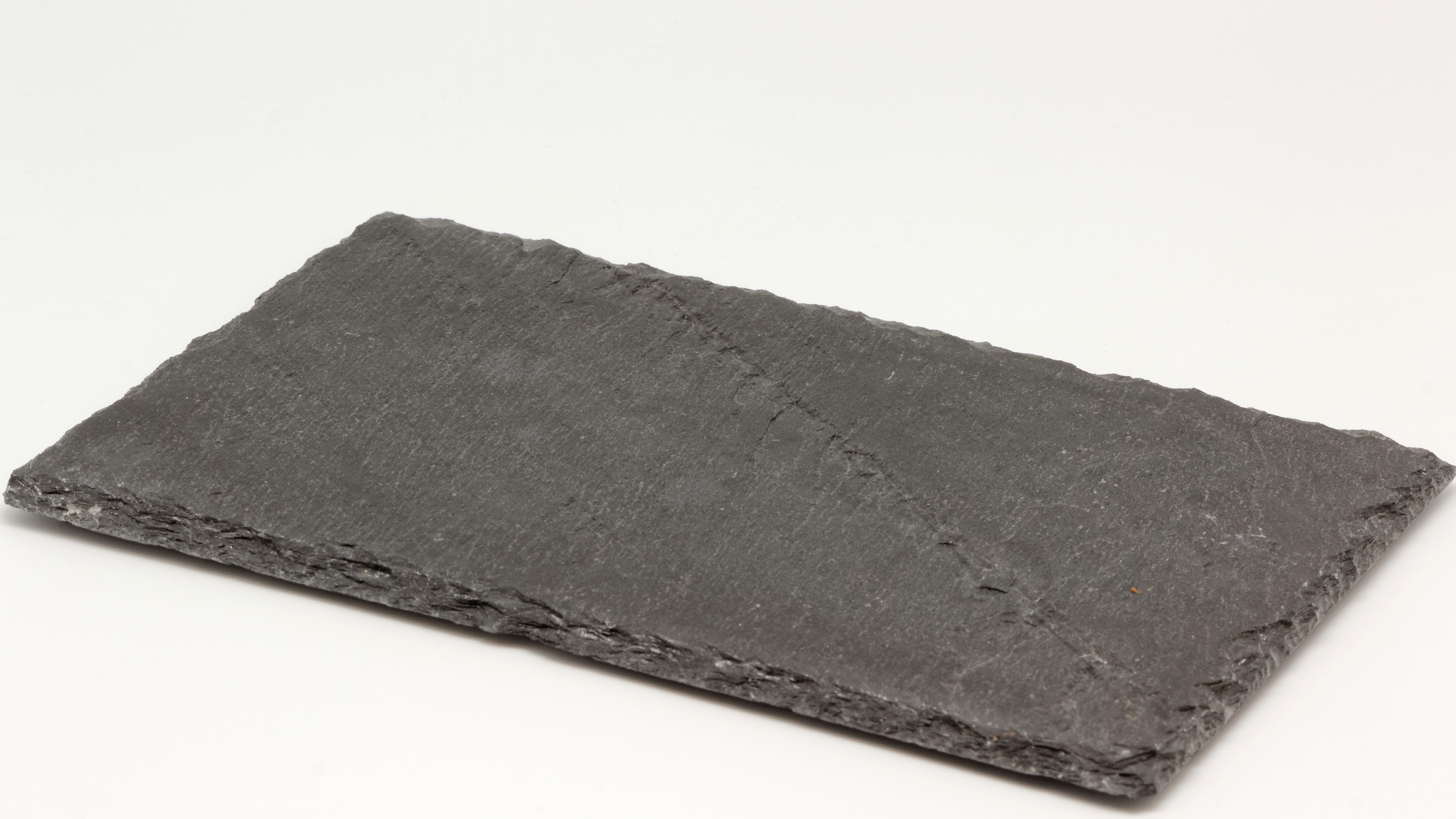
Slate displaying fissility

In geology, fissility is the ability or tendency of a rock to split along flat planes of weakness (“parting surfaces”). These planes of weakness are oriented parallel to stratification in sedimentary rocks. Fissility is differentiated from scaly fabric in hand sample by the parting surfaces’ continuously parallel orientations to each other and to stratification. Fissility is distinguished from scaly fabric in thin section by the well-developed orientation of platy minerals such as mica. Fissility is the result of sedimentary or metamorphic processes.

Planes of weakness are developed in sedimentary rocks such as shale or mudstone by clay particles aligning during compaction. Planes of weakness are developed in metamorphic rocks by the recrystallization and growth of micaceous minerals. A rock's fissility can be degraded in numerous ways during the geologic process, including clay particles flocculating into a random fabric before compaction, bioturbation during compaction, and weathering during and after uplift. The effect of bioturbation has been documented well in shale cores sampled: past variable critical depths where burrowing organisms can no longer survive, shale fissility will become more pervasive and better defined.

Fissility is used by some geologists as the defining characteristic which separates mudstone (no fissility) from shale (fissile). However, some professions, like drilling engineers, continue to use the terms shale and mudstone interchangeably.

== See also ==
- Fabric (geology)
- Fissure
- Fracture (geology)
