= Needmore Shale =

Needmore Formation
- Stratigraphic range: Emsian
- Type: sedimentary
- Underlies: Marcellus Shale and Millboro Shale
- Overlies: Oriskany Formation

Lithology
- Primary: shale

Location
- Region: Appalachian Mountains
- Country: United States
- Extent: Maryland, Pennsylvania, Virginia, and West Virginia

Type section
- Named for: Needmore, Pennsylvania
- Named by: Willard and Cleaves, 1939

The Devonian Needmore Formation or Needmore Shale is a mapped bedrock unit in Pennsylvania, Maryland, Virginia, and West Virginia.

== Description ==
The Needmore Formation was originally described by Willard and Cleaves in 1939 as a dark- to medium-gray limy shale, based on exposures in southern Fulton County, Pennsylvania. They considered it part of the Onondaga Group.

DeWitt and Colton (1964) described the Needmore as "soft calcareous medium dark-brownish-gray and greenish-gray shale and mudrock...and soft, slightly calcareous very fissile brownish-black shale" that is not resistant to weathering. They estimated its thickness in their study area (southern Bedford County, Pennsylvania, and most of Allegany County, Maryland) as approximately 150 feet.

=== Fossils ===
DeWitt and Colton (1964) identified brachiopods (Coelospira acutiplicata, Eodevonaria arcuata), trilobites (Viaphacops cristata), and ostracods (Favulella favulosa) in the Needmore.

=== Notable Exposures ===
Type locality is between Needmore and Warfordsburg in southern Fulton County, Pennsylvania.

== Age ==
Relative age dating places the Needmore in the middle Devonian.
