= Helderberg Group (geology) =

Geologic Group found in the Appalachian Basin

- Stratigraphic range: Lochkovian-Emsian; ~419–393 Ma
- Type: Group
- Sub-units: Port Ewen Shale Minisink Limestone New Scotland Formation Maskenozha Member Flatbrookville Member Coeymans Formation Kalkberg / Stormsville Members Shawnee / Revanna Members Depue Limestone Member Peters Valley Member Manlius Limestone Thacher Member
- Underlies: Onondaga Limestone Oriskany Formation
- Overlies: Salina Group; Tonoloway

Lithology
- Primary: Limestone
- Other: Dolomite, Chert

Location
- Region: New York, Pennsylvania, West Virginia, Maryland, Ohio
- Country: United States

Type section
- Named for: Helderberg Escarpment
- Named by: Conrad, T.A. 1839

The Helderberg Group is a geologic group that outcrops in the States of New York, Pennsylvania, Maryland, New Jersey, and West Virginia. It also is present subsurface in Ohio and the Canadian provinces of Ontario and Nova Scotia. It preserves fossils dating back to the Early Devonian and Late Silurian period. The name was coined by T.A. Conrad (1839) in the New York State Geological Survey Annual Report, named for the Helderberg Escarpment or Helderberg Mountains.

The upper portion of the Helderberg, or the Kalkberg Formation is host to the Bald Hill ash bed, dated to 417.6 million years ago.

The Helderberg is composed chiefly of limestone and dolomite.

In Maryland and southern Pennsylvania, the Helderberg is divided into three formations. These are the New Creek Limestone, the Corriganville Limestone, and the Mandata Shale. The total thickness is about 60 feet (18 m). The formations weather easily and are poorly exposed except in cuts and quarries.

== Stratigraphy ==
=== Manlius Limestone ===
The Manlius Limestone was first noted by Vanuxem (1840, p. 372) as a "waterlime" (hydraulic limestone) near Manlius, New York. The Manlius is composed of limestone, grainstone, calcareous mudstone and bindstone. The Manlius is 419 - 411 Ma.

The Thacher Member of the Manlius extends along eastern New York and down into parts of northern New Jersey. It is characterised as a "ribbon rock", meaning it contains very thin layers of alternating limestone and argillaceous rock. The color of the Thacher is dark blueish-black. The limestone is fine- to medium-grained. It averages 51 feet (16 m) thick. It makes up the upper part of the Manlius in New York State and makes up the entirety of the Manlius in northeastern New Jersey. Moving southwest, it become more argillaceous and arenaceous as it grades into Depue Limestone.

The Thacher contains fossils of stromatoporoids, crinoids, rugose corals, tabulate corals, tranchiopods, tentaculitids, and ostracodes.
