= Geology of the Appalachians =

Geologic description of the Appalachian Mountains

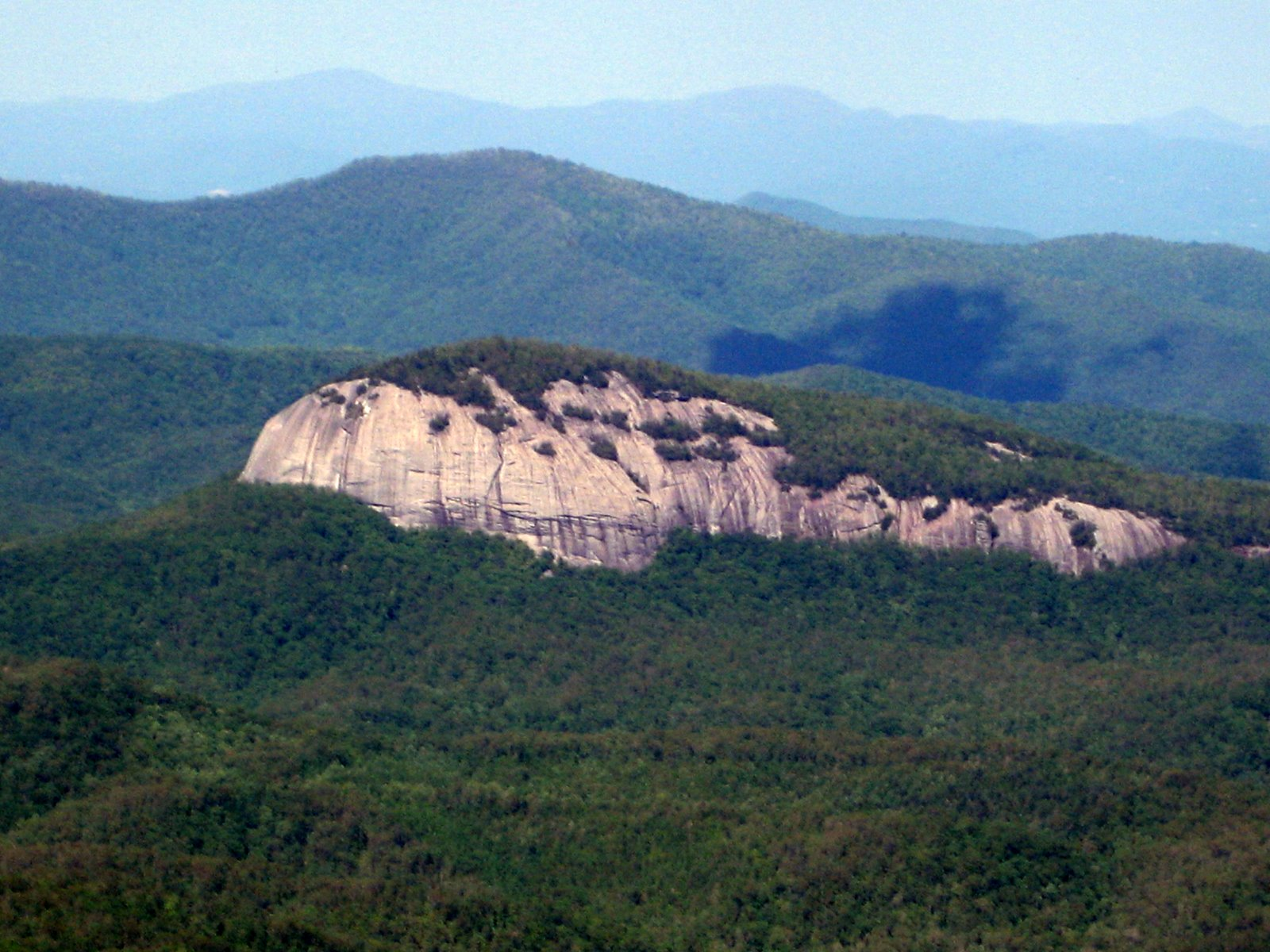
Looking Glass Rock from the Art Loeb Trail

The geology of the Appalachians dates back more than 1.2 billion years to the Mesoproterozoic era when two continental cratons collided to form the supercontinent Rodinia. The rocks exposed in today's Appalachian Mountains reveal elongate belts of folded and thrust faulted marine sedimentary rocks, volcanic rocks, and slivers of ancient ocean floor. The creation of the Appalachian ranges marks the first of several mountain building plate collisions that culminated in the construction of Pangea with the Appalachians and neighboring Anti-Atlas mountains (now in Morocco) near the center of the supercontinent. These mountain ranges likely once reached elevations similar to those of the Alps and the Rocky Mountains before they were eroded.

== Geological history ==
=== Overview ===
The Appalachian Mountains formed through a series of mountain-building events over the last 1.2 billion years:

- The Grenville orogeny began 1250 million years ago (Ma) and lasted for 270 million years.
- The Taconic orogeny began 450 Ma and lasted for 10 million years.
- The Acadian orogeny began 375 Ma and lasted 50 million years.
- The Alleghanian orogeny began 325 Ma and lasted 65 million years.

=== Proterozoic era ===
==== Grenville orogeny ====
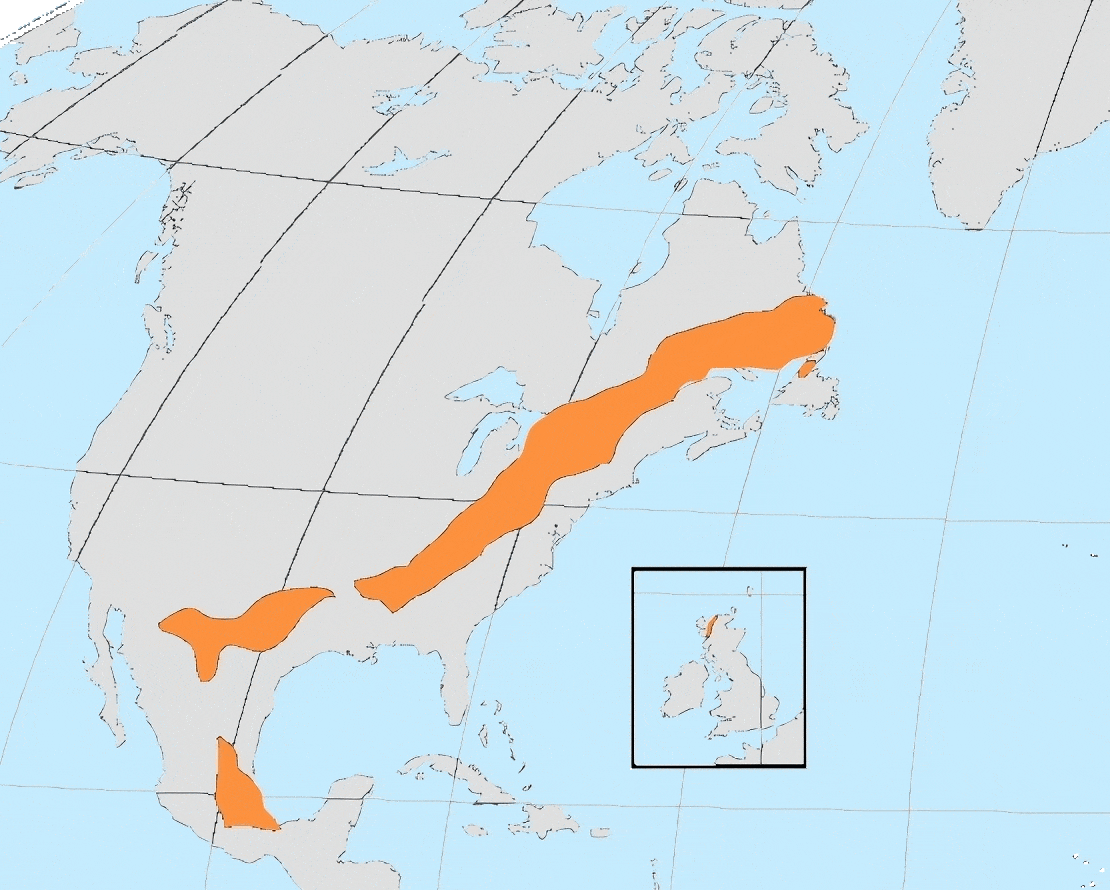
Land added to Laurentia during the Grenville orogeny

The first mountain-building tectonic plate collision that initiated the construction of what are today the Appalachian Mountains occurred during the Mesoproterozoic era at least one billion years ago when the pre-North-American craton called Laurentia collided with other continental segments, notably Amazonia. All the other cratons of the Earth also collided at about this time to form the supercontinent Rodinia, which was surrounded by one single ocean. The Grenville orogeny occurred between the colliding cratons. The present Appalachian Mountains have at least two areas which are made from rock that was formed during this orogeny: the Blue Ridge Mountains and the Adirondacks.

==== Breakup of Rodinia ====
After the Grenville orogeny, Rodinia began to break up. The mountains formed during the Grenvillian era underwent erosion from weathering, glaciation, and other natural processes, resulting in the leveling of the landscape. The eroded sediments from these mountains contributed to the formation of sedimentary basins and valleys.

For example, in what is now the southern Applachian Mountain, the Ocoee basin was formed. Seawater filled the basin. Rivers from the surrounding countryside carried clay, silt, sand, and gravel to the basin, much as rivers today carry sediment from the midcontinent region to the Gulf of Mexico. The sediment spread out in layers on the basin floor. The basin continued to subside, and over a long period of time, probably millions of years, a great thickness of sediment accumulated.

Eventually, the tectonic forces pulling the two continents apart became so strong that the Iapetus Ocean formed off the eastern coast of the Laurentian margin. The rocks of the Valley and Ridge province formed in this ocean over millions of years. Shells and other hard parts of ancient marine plants and animals accumulated to form limey deposits that later became limestone, similar to modern oceans. The weathering of limestone exposed at the land surface produces the lime-rich soils that are so prevalent in the fertile farmland of the Valley and Ridge province.

During the break-up of Rodinia, around 600 million to 560 million years ago, volcanic activity was present along the tectonic margins. Mount Rogers, Whitetop Mountain, and Pine Mountain in the Blue Ridge Mountains are all the result of volcanic activity that occurred around this time. Evidence of subsurface activity (dikes and sills intruding into the overlying rock) is present in the Blue Ridge as well. For instance, mafic rocks have been found along the Fries Fault in the central Blue Ridge area of Montgomery County, Virginia.

=== Paleozoic era ===
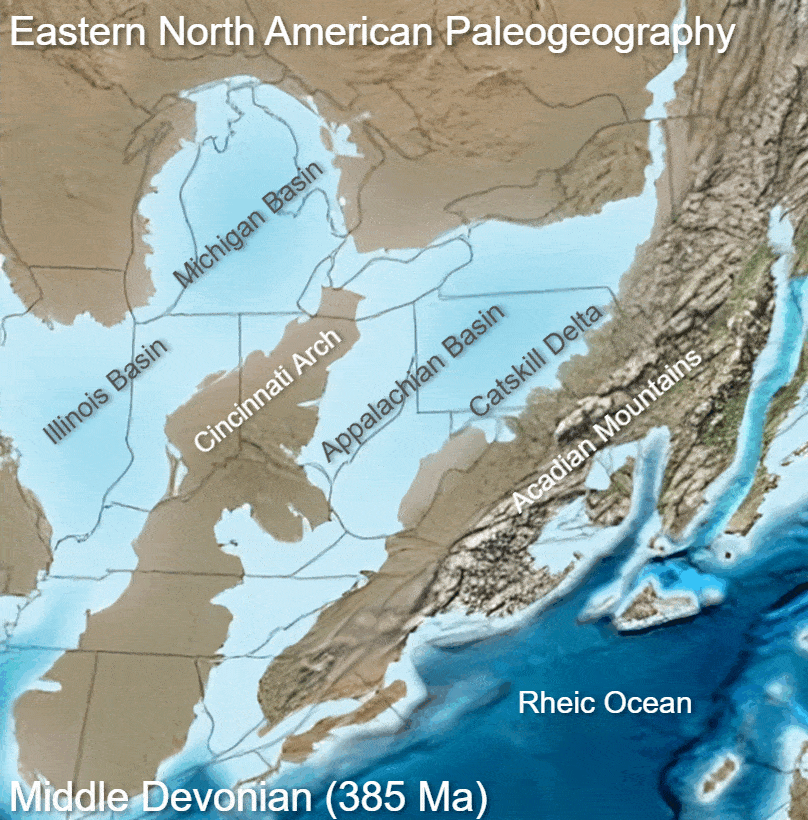
Paleogeographic reconstruction showing the Appalachian Basin area during the Middle Devonian epoch

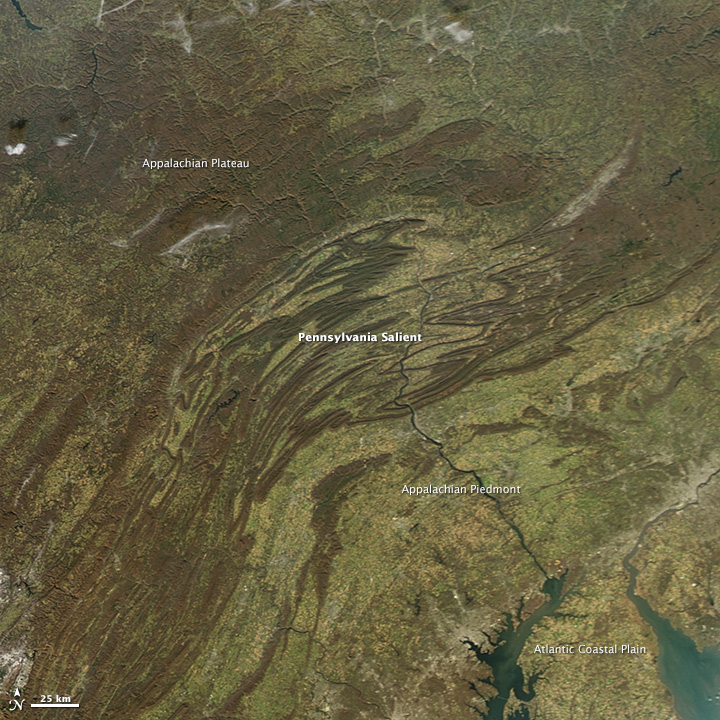
The "Pennsylvania Salient" in the Appalachians appears to have been formed by a large, dense block of mafic volcanic rocks that became a barrier and forced the mountains to push up around it. 2012 image from NASA's Aqua satellite.

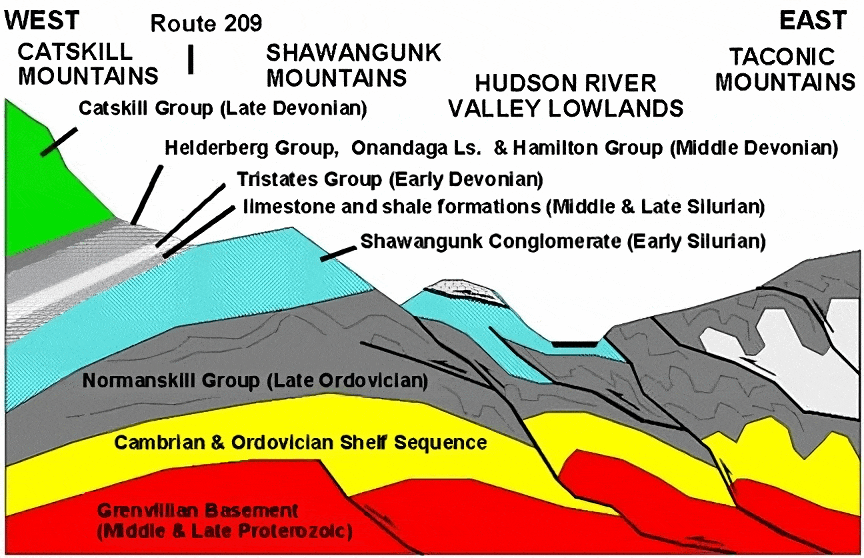
Generalized east-to-west cross section through the central Hudson Valley region. USGS image.

During the earliest part of the Paleozoic, the continent that would later become North America straddled the equator. The Appalachian region was a passive plate margin, not unlike today's Atlantic Coastal Plain province. During this interval, the region was periodically submerged beneath shallow seas. Thick layers of sediment and carbonate rock were deposited on the shallow sea bottom when the region was submerged. When seas receded, terrestrial sedimentary deposits and erosion dominated.

During the middle Ordovician (about 458-470 million years ago), a change in plate motions set the stage for the first Paleozoic mountain building event (Taconic orogeny) in North America. The once quiet Appalachian passive margin changed to a very active plate boundary when a neighboring oceanic crust, the Iapetus, collided with and began sinking beneath the North American craton. With the creation of this new subduction zone, the early Appalachians were born.

Volcanoes grew along the continental margin, coincident with the initiation of subduction. Thrust faulting uplifted and warped older sedimentary rock laid down on the passive margin. As mountains rose, erosion began to wear them down. Streams carried rock debris downslope to be deposited in nearby lowlands.

Mountain building continued periodically throughout the next 250 million years, comprising the Caledonian, Acadian, Ouachita, Hercynian, and Alleghanian orogenies. Continent after continent was thrust and sutured onto the North American craton as Pangea began to take shape. Microplates, smaller bits of crust too small to be called continents, were swept in one by one to be welded to the growing mass.

By about 300 million years ago in the Pennsylvanian period, Africa/Gondwana was approaching the North American craton. The collisional belt spread into the Ozark-Ouachita region and through the Marathon Mountains area of Texas. Continental collisions raised the Appalachian-Ouachita chain to a lofty mountain range on the scale of the present-day Himalayas. The massive bulk of Pangea was completed during the Permian period when Gondwana plowed into the continental agglomeration, with the Appalachian-Ouachita mountains near the middle of the super-continent.

=== Mesozoic era and later ===
Pangea began to break up about 220 million years ago, in the late Triassic period. As Pangea rifted apart, a new passive tectonic margin was born, and the forces that created the Appalachian, Ouachita, and Marathon Mountains were stilled. Weathering and erosion prevailed, and the mountains began to wear away.

By the end of the Mesozoic, the Appalachian Mountains had been eroded to an almost-flat plain. It was not until the region was uplifted during the Cenozoic era that the distinctive topography of the present formed. Uplift rejuvenated the streams, which rapidly responded by cutting downward into the ancient bedrock. Some streams flowed along weak layers that define the folds and faults created many millions of years earlier. Other streams downcut so rapidly that they cut right across the resistant folded rocks of the mountain core, carving canyons across rock layers and geologic structures. The ridges of the Appalachian Mountain core represent erosion-resistant rock that remained after the rock above and beside it was eroded away.

== Physiographic provinces ==
The geographic boundaries of the Appalachian Mountains follow a definition that accounts for all the land mass in the United States and Canada used by the US Geological Survey and the Geologic Survey of Canada using physiography. The US uses the term Appalachian Highlands, and Canada uses the term Appalachian Uplands, to define contiguous regions that have similar geology, topography, history, and native plant and animal communities. The Appalachian Mountains are not synonymous with the Appalachian Plateau, which is one of the provinces of the Appalachian Highlands.

=== Appalachian Basin ===
The Appalachian Basin is a foreland basin containing Paleozoic sedimentary rocks of early Cambrian through early Permian age. From north to south, the Appalachian Basin province crosses New York, Pennsylvania, eastern Ohio, West Virginia, western Maryland, eastern Kentucky, western Virginia, eastern Tennessee, northwestern Georgia, and northeastern Alabama. The northern end of the Appalachian Basin extends offshore into Lakes Erie and Ontario as far as the United States–Canada border. The province covers an area of about 185,500 square miles (480,000 km^{2}) and is 1,075 miles (1,730 km) long from northeast to southwest and between 20 and 310 miles (30 and 500 km) wide from northwest to southeast.

The northwestern flank of the basin is a broad homocline that dips gently southeastward off the Cincinnati Arch. A complexly thrust faulted and folded terrane (Appalachian Fold and Thrust Belt or Eastern Overthrust Belt), formed at the end of the Paleozoic by the Alleghanian orogeny, characterizes the eastern flank of the basin. Metamorphic and igneous rocks of the Blue Ridge Thrust Belt that bounds the eastern part of the Appalachian Basin Province were thrust westward more than 150 miles (240 km) over lower Paleozoic sedimentary rocks.

==== Coal, oil, and gas production ====
The Appalachian Basin is one of the most important coal producing regions in the U.S. and one of the largest in the world. Bituminous coal has been mined throughout the last three centuries. Currently, the coal primarily is used within the eastern U.S. or exported for electrical power generation, but some of it is suitable for metallurgical uses. Economically important coal beds were deposited primarily during Pennsylvanian time in a southeastward-thickening foreland basin. Coal and associated rocks form a clastic wedge that thickens from north to south, from Pennsylvania into southeast West Virginia and southwestern Virginia.

Discovery of oil in 1859 in the Drake Well, Venango County, Pennsylvania, marked the beginning of the oil and gas industry in the Appalachian Basin. The discovery well opened a prolific trend of oil and gas fields, producing from upper Devonian, Mississippian, and Pennsylvanian sandstone reservoirs that extend from southern New York, across western Pennsylvania, central West Virginia, and eastern Ohio, to eastern Kentucky.

A second major trend of oil and gas production in the Appalachian Basin began with the discovery in 1885 of oil and gas in lower Silurian Clinton sandstone reservoirs in Knox County, Ohio. By the late 1880s and early 1900s, the trend extended both north and south across east-central Ohio and included several counties in western New York where gas was discovered in lower Silurian Medina Group sandstones. About 1900, large oil reserves were discovered in Silurian and Devonian carbonate reservoirs in east-central Kentucky. Important gas discoveries from the lower Devonian Oriskany Sandstone in Guernsey County, Ohio, in 1924; Schuyler County, New York, in 1930; and Kanawha County, West Virginia, in 1936 opened a major gas-producing trend across parts of New York, Pennsylvania, Maryland, Ohio, West Virginia, Kentucky, and Virginia. Another drilling boom occurred in the 1960s in Morrow County, Ohio, where oil was discovered in the Upper Cambrian part of the Knox Dolomite.

=== Crystalline Appalachians ===
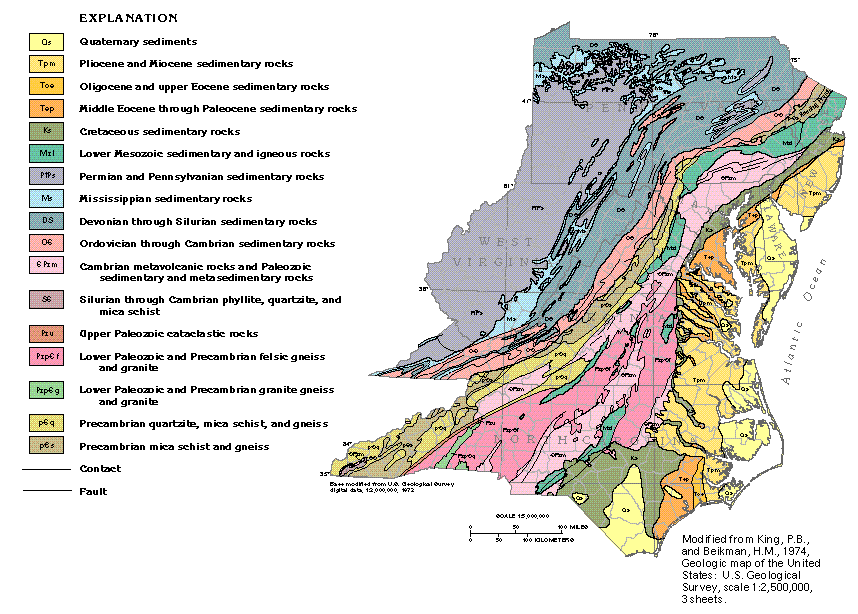
Geological map of the southern Crystalline Appalachians

The Blue Ridge, Piedmont, Adirondack, and New England Provinces are collectively known as the Crystalline Appalachians because they consist of Precambrian and Cambrian igneous and metamorphic rocks.

The Blue Ridge Thrust Belt Province underlies parts of eight states from central Alabama to southern Pennsylvania. Along its western margin, the Blue Ridge is thrust over the folded and faulted margin of the Appalachian basin, so that a broad segment of Paleozoic strata extends eastward for tens of miles, buried beneath these subhorizontal crystalline thrust sheets. At the surface, the Blue Ridge consists of a mountainous to hilly region, the main component of which are the Blue Ridge Mountains that extend from Georgia to Pennsylvania. Surface rocks consist mainly of a core of moderate-to high-rank crystalline metamorphic or igneous rocks which, because of their superior resistance to weathering and erosion, commonly rise above the adjacent areas of low-grade metamorphic and sedimentary rock. The province is bounded on the north and west by the Paleozoic strata of the Appalachian Basin and on the south by Cretaceous and younger sedimentary rocks of the Gulf Coastal Plain. It is bounded on the east by metamorphic and sedimentary rocks of the Piedmont Province.

The Adirondack and New England Provinces include sedimentary, meta-sedimentary, and plutonic igneous rocks, mainly of Cambrian and Ordovician age, similar lithologically to rocks in the Blue Ridge and Piedmont Provinces to the south. The uplifted, nearly-circular Adirondack Mountains consist of a core of ancient Precambrian rocks that are surrounded by upturned Cambrian and Ordovician sedimentary rocks.

== Notes and references ==
- Goodge, J. W.; Vervoort, J. D.; Fanning, C. M.; Brecke, D. M.; Farmer, G. L.; Williams, I. S.; Myrow, P. M.; DePaolo, D. J. (2008). "A positive test of East Antarctica–Laurentia juxtaposition within the Rodinia supercontinent" (PDF). Science. 321 (5886): 235–240. Bibcode:2008Sci...321..235G. doi:10.1126/science.1159189. ISSN 0036-8075. PMID 18621666. S2CID 11799613.
- Loewy, S. L.; Dalziel, I. W. D.; Pisarevsky, S.; Connelly, J. N.; Tait, J.; Hanson, R. E.; Bullen, D. (2011). "Coats Land crustal block, East Antarctica: A tectonic tracer for Laurentia?". Geology. 39 (9): 859–862. Bibcode:2011Geo....39..859L. doi:10.1130/G32029.1.
