= Geology of Bedford County, Pennsylvania =

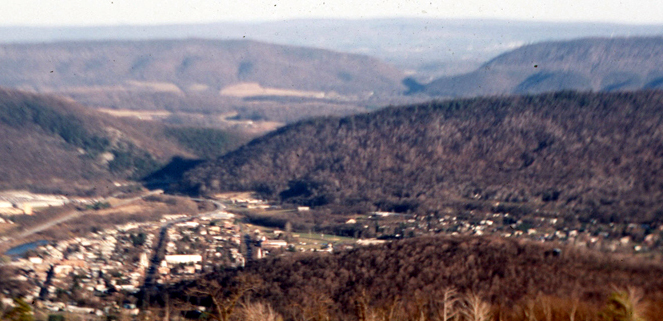
View of water gaps cut by the Raystown Branch of the Juniata River through Evitts Mountain and Tussey Mountain, facing west from the summit of Kinton Knob, Wills Mountain, in Bedford County, Pennsylvania, with the town of Bedford in the foreground.

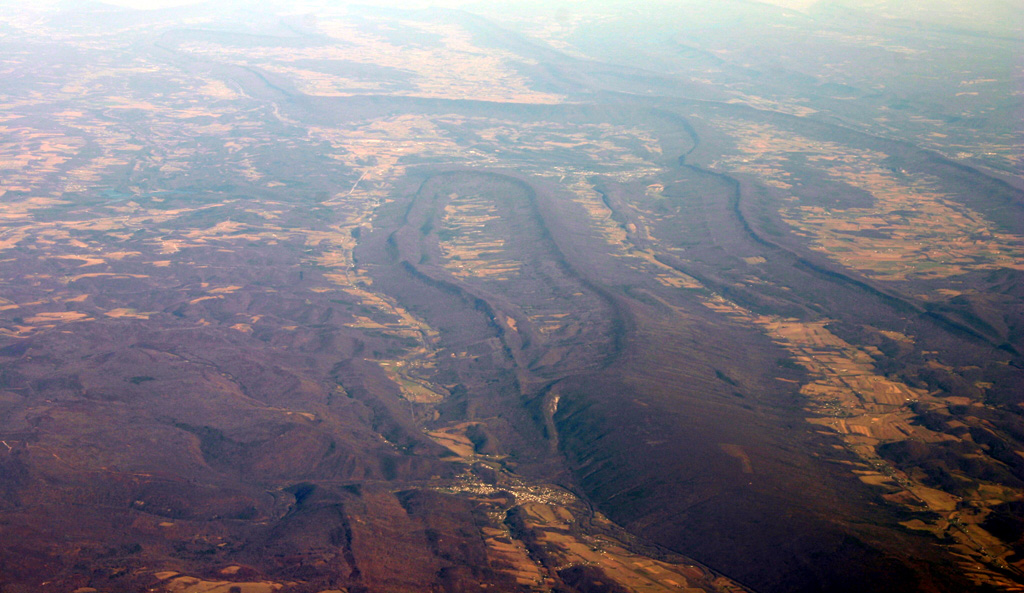
Oblique air photo facing north of central Bedford County, Pennsylvania, in December 2006, showing Wills, Evitts, and Tussey Mountains from center to right.

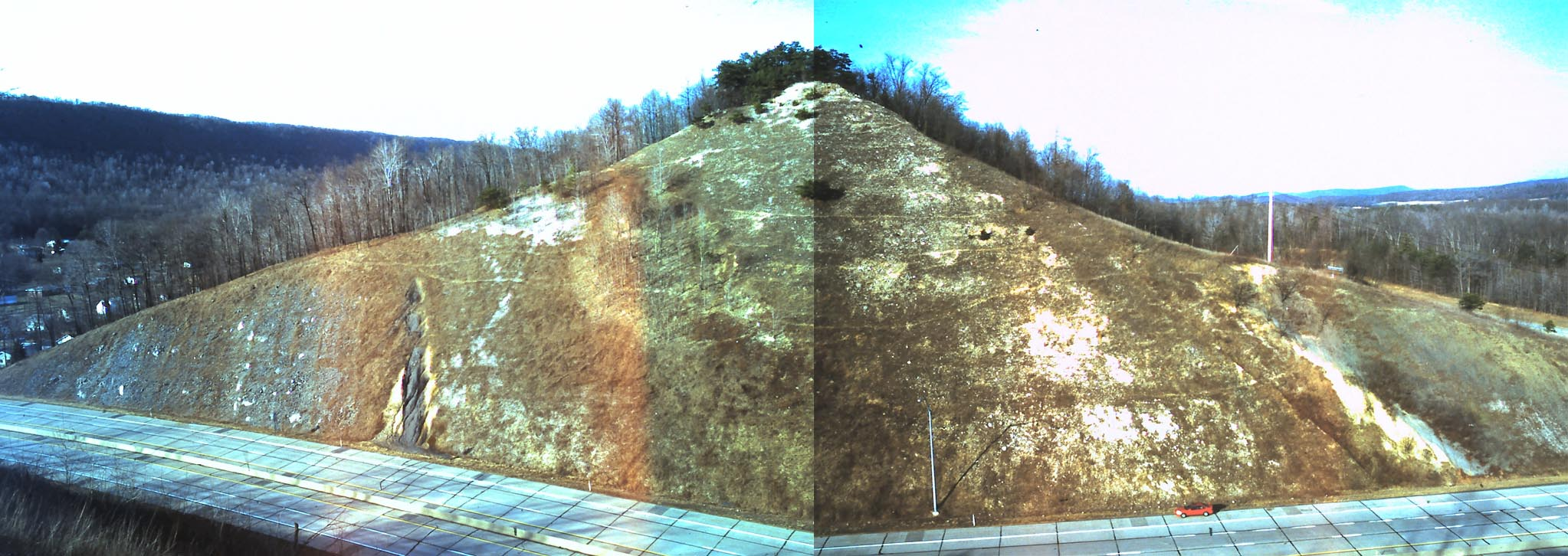
Roadcut along Rt. 30 (Everett bypass) through Warrior Ridge, showing the lower Devonian sequence from the Corriganville Limestone at left to the Ridgeley Sandstone to the Needmore Shale at right, and Tussey Mountain in background at left.

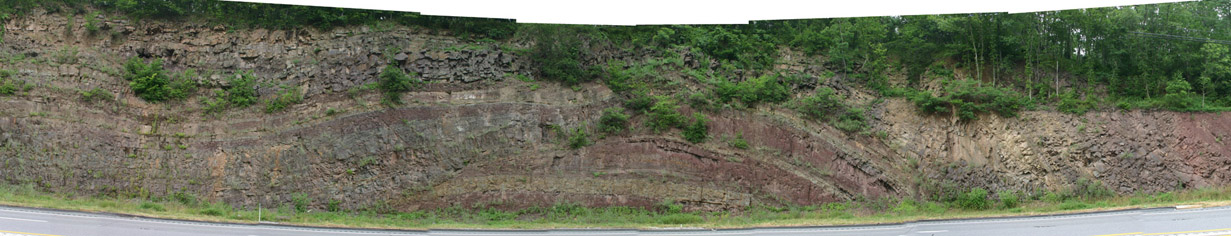
Outcrop of the Devonian Catskill Formation with a well-displayed thrust fault, located about 3 miles west of the village of Juniata Crossing on the north side of Route 30, Bedford County, Pennsylvania.

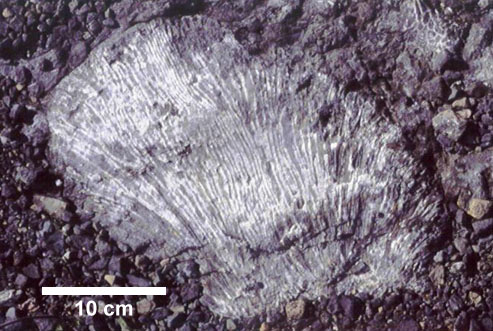
Fossil coral of the Devonian Keyser Formation in the New Enterprise New Paris Quarry, Chestnut Ridge Bedford County, Pennsylvania.

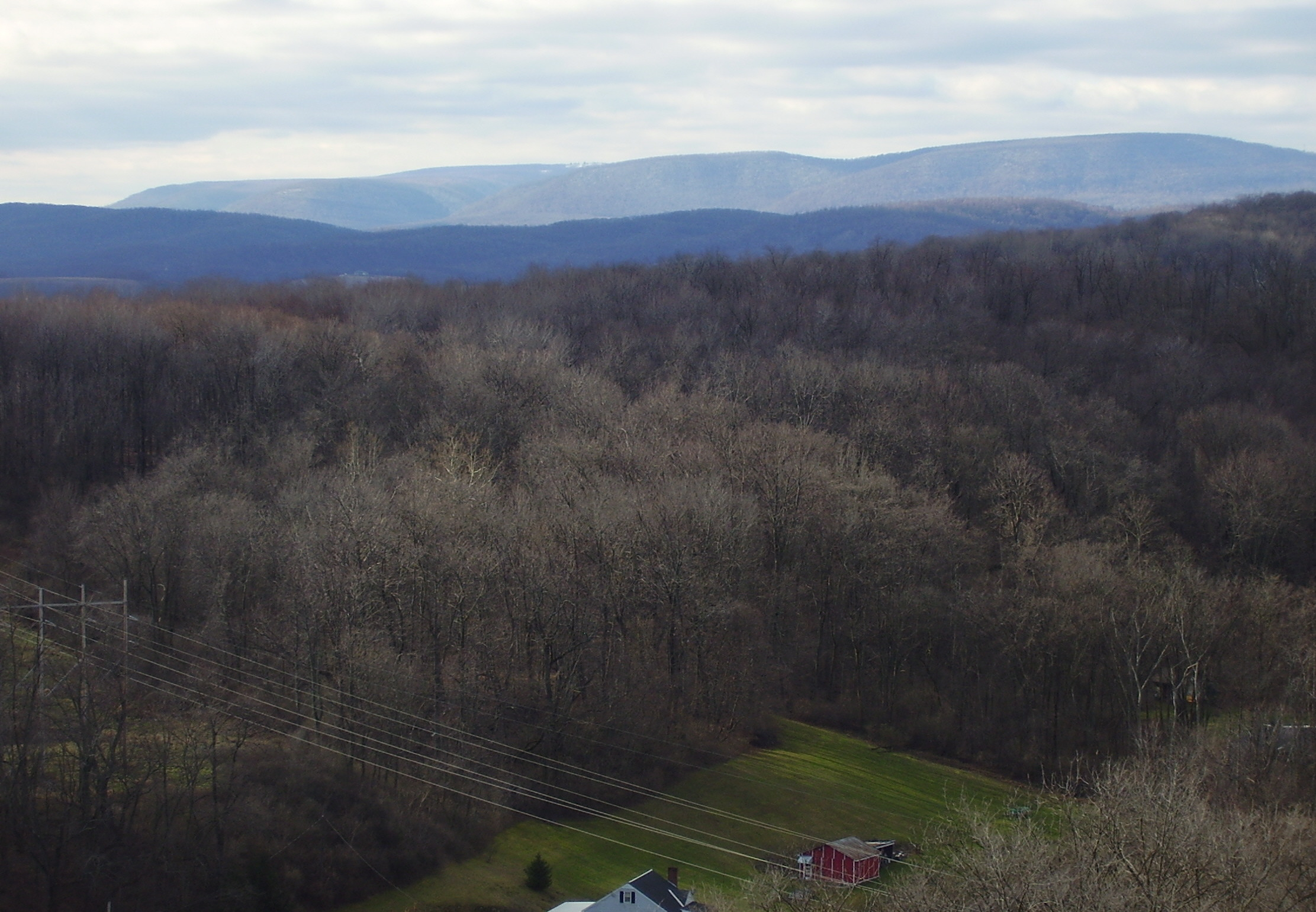
The Blue Knob massif (the summit is the snow field in the middle of the range).

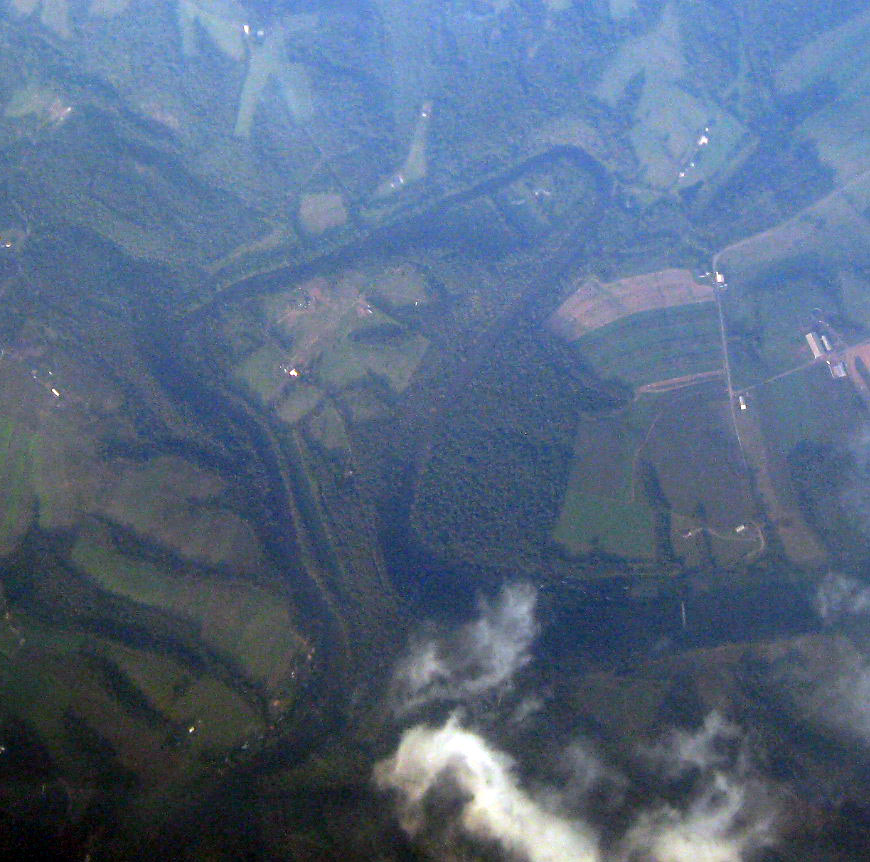
Prominent meander in the Raystown Branch near Breezewood

Bedford County, Pennsylvania is situated along the western border of the Ridge and Valley physiographic province, which is characterized by folded and faulted sedimentary rocks of early to middle Paleozoic age. The northwestern border of the county is approximately at the Allegheny Front, a geological boundary between the Ridge and Valley Province and the Allegheny Plateau (characterized by relatively flat-lying sedimentary rocks of late Paleozoic age). (PA Geological Survey Map 13)

The stratigraphic record of sedimentary rocks within the county spans from the Cambrian Warrior Formation to the Pennsylvanian Conemaugh Group (in the Broad Top area). No igneous or metamorphic rocks of any kind exist within the county.

The primary mountains within the county (From west to east: Wills, Evitts, Dunning, and Tussey mountains) extend from the southern border with Maryland to the northeast into Blair County, and are held up by the Silurian Tuscarora Formation, made of quartz sandstone and conglomerate. Chestnut Ridge is a broad anticline held up by the Devonian Ridgeley Member of the Old Port Formation, also made of sandstone and conglomerate. Broad Top, located north of Breezewood, is a plateau of relatively flat-lying rocks that are stratigraphically higher, and thus younger (Mississippian and Pennsylvanian), than most of the other rocks within the county (Cambrian through Devonian). Broad Top extends into Huntingdon County to the north and Fulton County to the east.

The Raystown Branch of the Juniata River is the main drainage in the northern two-thirds of the county. The river flows to the east through the mountains within the county through several water gaps caused by a group of faults trending east–west through the central part of the county. The river then turns north and flows into Raystown Lake in Huntingdon County. The southern third of the county is drained by several tributaries of the Potomac River. Both the Potomac and Juniata rivers are part of the Chesapeake Bay Watershed.

All of Bedford County lies far to the south of the terminal moraine, and thus it was never glaciated (PA Geological Survey Map 59). However, during the Pleistocene epoch, or "Ice Age," periglacial (meaning "around glacier" or simply "cold") processes dominated. Most of the county was most likely a tundra at that time. The many boulder fields obvious as rocky and often treeless areas on mountainsides within the county formed as a result of seasonal freeze-thaw cycles during the Pleistocene.

Several limestone quarries exist in Bedford County, most of which are owned and operated by New Enterprise Stone & Lime Company. Quarry locations include Ashcom, New Paris (inactive), Kilcoin (closed), and Sproul (inactive).

Two coal fields exist within Bedford County. One is the Broad Top Field in the northeastern corner of the county, and the other is the Georges Creek Field along the southwestern border (PA Geological Survey Map 11). Both fields contain bituminous coal. There are abandoned mines in both areas and acid mine drainage is an environmental problem in the Broad Top area, where several fishless streams exist as a result of the discharge from the abandoned mines.

Natural gas fields and storage areas exist in southeastern Bedford County, primarily within folded Devonian rocks south of Breezewood. Another deep gas field exists in the vicinity of Blue Knob on the border with Blair County to the north. (PA Geological Survey Map 10)

== Notable features ==
Interesting geologic features within Bedford County include some of the following:

- New Enterprise New Paris quarry, where fossil corals and bryozoans may be found within the Devonian Keyser Formation.
- Coral Caverns in Manns Choice.
- The roadcut through Warrior Ridge on Rt. 30 (Everett Bypass), where an exposure of Silurian and Devonian rocks from limestone to shale to conglomerate can be seen.
- The roadcut on the north side of the Pennsylvania Turnpike at the Narrows water gap (where the Raystown Branch cuts through Evitts Mountain) exposes a continuous section of the Reedsville Formation, Bald Eagle Formation, Juniata Formation, and the Tuscarora Formation. The beds of the Bald Eagle are overturned, folded, and faulted. The Tuscarora and Juniata are also exposed on the south side of the gap along Rt. 30.
- Sweet Root Natural Area, within Buchanan State Forest and located near Chaneysville, where periglacial processes have created a bouldery landscape by eroding the Tuscarora Formation of Tussey Mountain.
- Blue Knob, a notable ski resort and recreational area, is also the state's second highest point at 3146 feet/959 m (after Mount Davis in Somerset County to the west).
- A transpression structure is located on the northern border of the county (shared with Blair County), about three miles east of the town of Woodbury. This structure is an up-thrust block of Cambrian and Ordovician rocks bounded on all sides by north-trending faults. The southern tip of the structure is approximately at Pulpit Hill.
- An outcrop on the north side of Rt. 30 about three miles west of the village of Juniata Crossing shows an excellent example of a thrust fault within the Devonian Catskill Formation.
- The Raystown Branch of the Juniata River between Breezewood and Raystown Lake to the north is an example of a river with incised (or entrenched) meanders.

== See also ==
- Bedford County
- Geology of Pennsylvania
