= Loysburg, Pennsylvania =

Unincorporated community in Pennsylvania, US

- Unincorporated community
- Location within the U.S. state of Pennsylvania Loysburg (the United States)
- Coordinates: 40°9′39″N 78°22′30″W
- Country: United States
- State: Pennsylvania
- County: Bedford
- Township: South Woodbury
- Time zone: UTC-5 (Eastern (EST))
  - Summer (DST): UTC-4 (EDT)
- ZIP codes: 16659
- Area code: 814
- GNIS feature ID: 1180053

Loysburg is an unincorporated community in the Morrisons Cove area of South Woodbury Township, Bedford County, Pennsylvania, United States. It lies along Pennsylvania Route 36 and the Yellow Creek near the Loysburg Gap in Tussey Mountain. Once named "Pattonville" in 1844 but was renamed back to Loysburg in 1864. Northern Bedford County Middle/High School is located in the area.

== General information ==
- ZIP Code: 16659
- Area Code: 814
- Local Phone Exchanges: 423, 575, 766
- School District: Northern Bedford County School District
