= Chestnut Ridge, Bedford County =

Hill in Pennsylvania, United States

Coordinates: 40.1014°N 78.6260°W

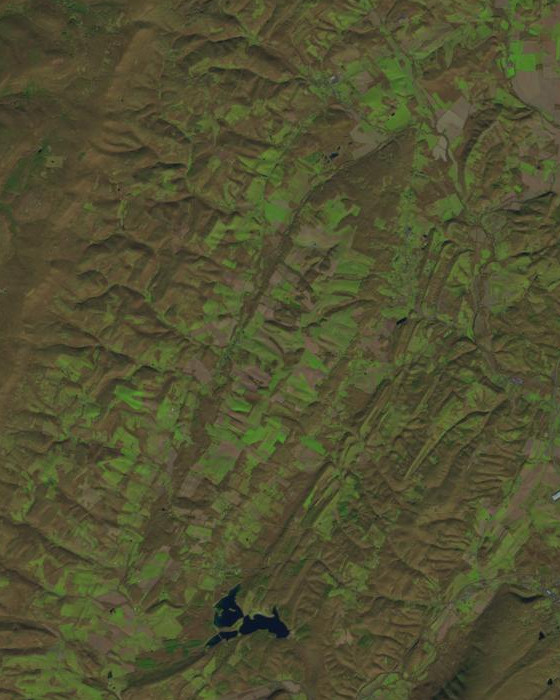
2016 Landsat image of Chestnut Ridge

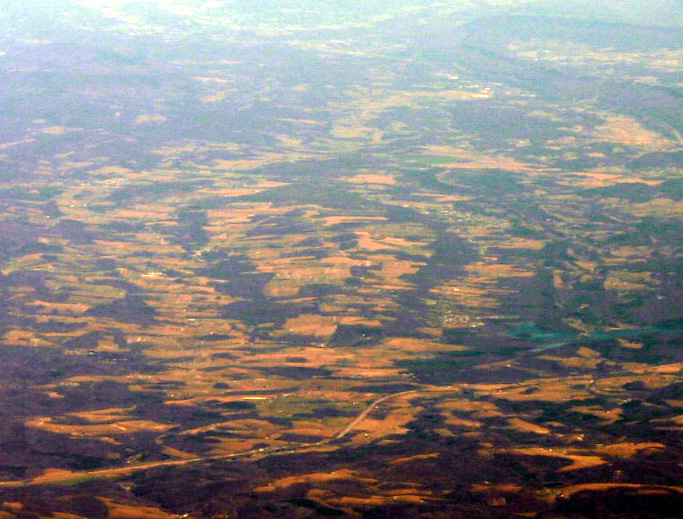
Oblique air photo of Chestnut Ridge, facing northeast

Chestnut Ridge is an elongate hill trending northeast-southwest in west-central Bedford County, Pennsylvania. It is partially forested with rural homes, farms, and notably apple orchards. Four small towns surround it: Schellsburg, New Paris, Fishertown, and Pleasantville. Shawnee State Park and Shawnee Lake lie immediately to the south of the ridge.

Chestnut Ridge School District is named after the ridge.

== Geology ==
Geologically, Chestnut Ridge is a doubly plunging anticline. The bedrock along the axis is the Devonian Onondaga Formation and Old Port Formation, consisting primarily of sandstone. The crest of the hill is at approximately 1,700 feet (520 m) elevation.

The New Enterprise Stone & Lime Co., Inc. New Paris Quarry (inactive) is located on the northwest flank of the ridge. Early Devonian Limestone of the fossiliferous Keyser Formation is quarried there.

See also Geology of Bedford County, Pennsylvania.
