= Northern Bedford County Middle/High School =

Coordinates: 40.17781°N 78.38046°W

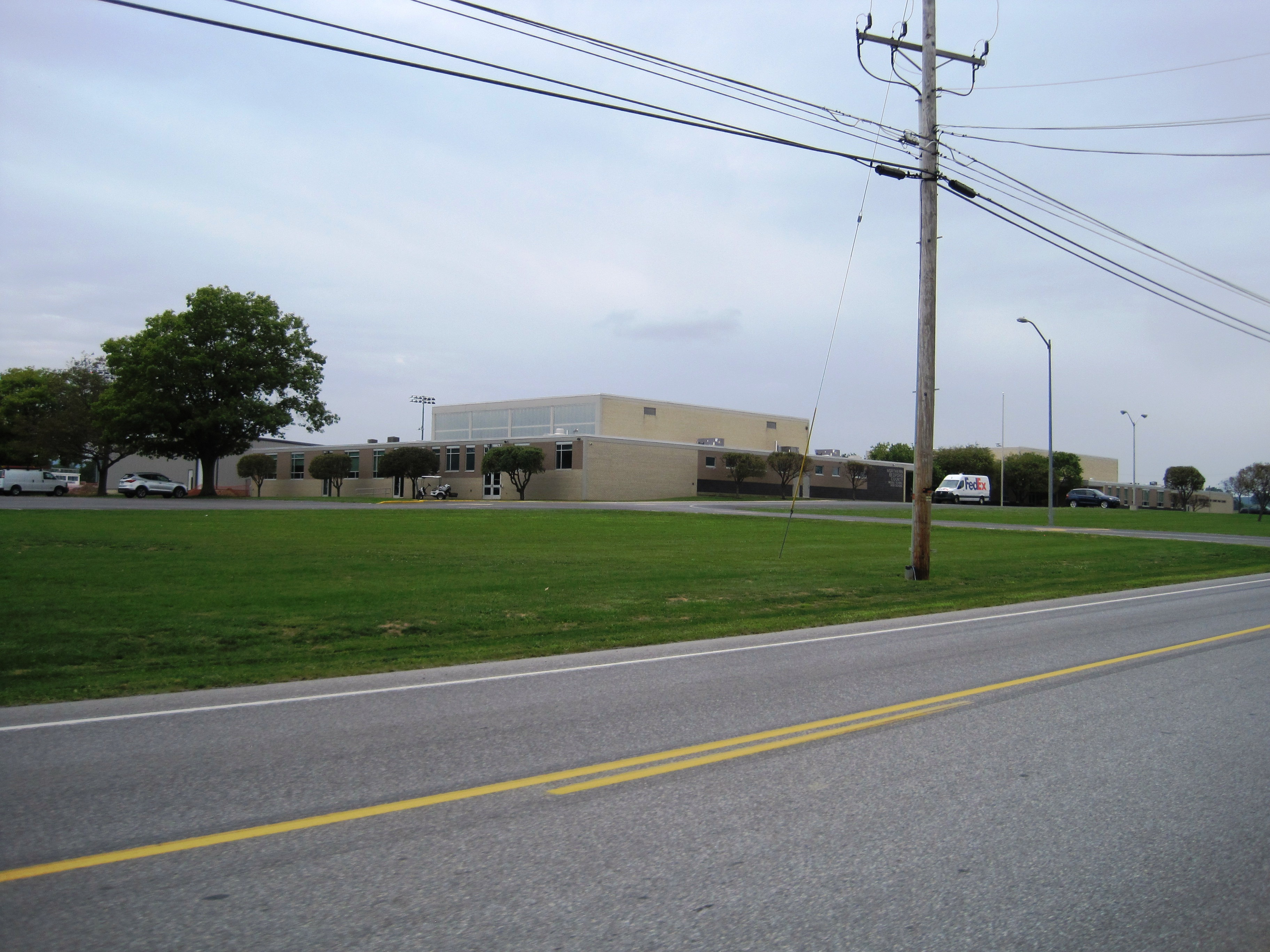

Location
- 152 NBC Drive; Loysburg, Pennsylvania 16659; United States

Information
- School type: Public high school
- Director: Todd Beatty
- Principal: Kendra Pritchett and Michael Mele
- Faculty: 43.1
- Grades: 6-12
- Enrollment: 642 (as of 2007-08)
- Student to teacher ratio: 15:1
- Colors: black and white
- Mascot: Panther
- Communities served: Hopewell, Woodbury
- Information: (814) 766-2221
- Website: https://hs.nbcsd.org/ campus type = Rural

Northern Bedford County Middle/High School (commonly NBC) is a coeducational combination public middle school and public secondary school in Loysburg, Pennsylvania, United States, serving students in grades 6–12. A private company operates the school under contract with the county, Northern Bedford County School District, Inc.

== History ==
NBC became a reality in 1957 with the jointure of three high schools into one. Classes were held in the three high schools until construction of the current High School was completed on May 8, 1963, for a cost of $1.25 Million Dollars. An addition of six classrooms, service areas, and a Vocational Building/Greenhouse was completed in 1976-77.

== Graduation Requirements ==
Students at Northern Bedford must complete 28.5 Credits of coursework, and complete a Cultamating Project as well as score "proficient" or above on the PSA's:

=== Coursework Breakdown ===
- English - 4.0 Credits
- Math - 3 or 4 Credits, depending on the student plans to attend a four-year school after not
- Science - 3 or 4 Credits, depending on the student plans to attend a four-year school afterward or not
- Social Studies - 3 or 4 Credits, depending or not if the student plans to attend a four-year school after or not
- Arts/Humanities - 2 Credits
- Electives - 6 Credits (Including CTE Courses, which are held on-site)
- Physical Education - 2 Credits
- Health - 0.5 Credit
- Family/Consumer Science - 0.5 Credit (Grade 12)
- Graduation Project - 0.5

== Career-Technology Education ==
The school has a Vocational Building on-site in which students can participate in a trade:

- Agriculture
- Automotive Technology
- Building Construction
- Horticulture

== Clubs ==
The following clubs are available at Northern Bedford:

- After 3
- Band
- Band Front
- Chess
- Chorus
- Future Business Leaders of America (FBLA)
- Fellowship of Christian Athletes (FCA)
- Future Classroom and Community Leaders of America (FCCLA)
- Future Farmers of America (FFA)
- Horticulture Club
- National Honor Society
- Press Club
- Prom Junior Class Advisors
- SADD
- Scholastic Scrimmage
- Senior Trip Class Advisors
- Ski Club
- SkillsUSA (For Automotive and Building Construction Classes)
- Sport Shooting
- Student Council
- Varsity Club
- Technology Student Association
- Yearbook
- Classic Tractor Enthusiasts

== Athletics ==
Northern Bedford is a member of the Pennsylvania Interscholastic Athletic Association (PIAA), NBC is in District V.

- Baseball
- Basketball
- Football
- Golf
- Soccer
- Softball
- Track and Field
- Volleyball
- Wrestling
- Fencing
