= Northern Bedford County School District =

School district in Pennsylvania

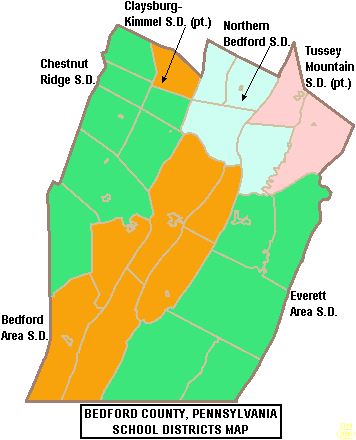

Address
- NBC Drive Loysburg, Pennsylvania, 16659; United States

District information
- Type: Public
- Established: 1957

Students and staff
- Colors: Black and White

Other information
- Website: http://nbcsd.org/

The Northern Bedford County School District is a public school district serving parts of Bedford County, Pennsylvania. The boroughs of Hopewell and Woodbury and the townships of Bloomfield, Hopewell, Woodbury, and South Woodbury are located within district boundaries. It encompasses approximately 112 square miles. According to 2000 federal census data, it serves a resident population of 6,556.

== Schools ==
- Northern Bedford County Elementary School (Grades PreK-5)
  - 217 NBC Dr.
    Loysburg, Pennsylvania 16659
- Northern Bedford County Middle School (Grades 6–8)
  - 152 NBC Dr.
    Loysburg, Pennsylvania 16659
- Northern Bedford County High School (Grades 9–12)
  - 152 NBC Dr.
    Loysburg, Pennsylvania 16659

== District history ==
The school district was established in 1957 with its first graduating class in 1958. The present facility opened in 1963 as Northern Bedford County High School as the merger effort of Replogle, Smith, and Woodbury High Schools. A Vocational Building with a greenhouse was added in 1976, with a classroom addition added the next year. The current elementary school was constructed and first used for the 1988–1989 school year, which eliminated the use of the three former elementary school buildings.

== Extracurriculars ==
The district offers a variety of clubs, activities and sports.

=== Athletics ===
- Baseball – Class A
- Softball
- Basketball – Class A
- Football – Class A
- Golf – Class AAAA
- Soccer – Class A/AA
- Softball – Class A
- Track and Field – Class AA
- Volleyball – Class A
- Wrestling – Class AA
- Cross Country
- Cheer
