= Loysburg Gap, Pennsylvania =

Water gap in Pennsylvania, US

Coordinates: 40°09′35″N 78°21′57″W

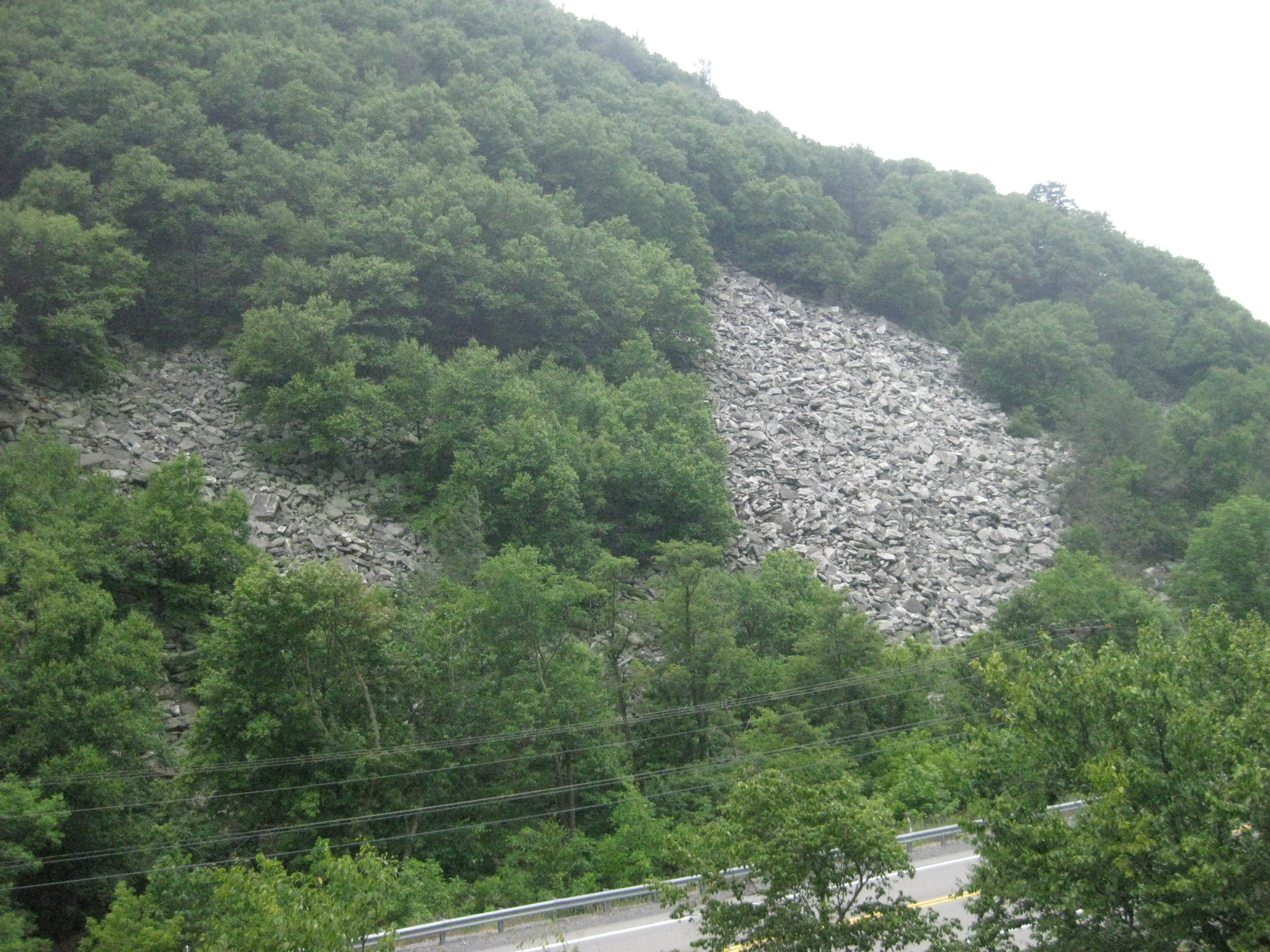
A view of the south side of the gap from the north side.

Loysburg Gap is a water gap where Pennsylvania Route 36 and the Yellow Creek pass through Tussey Mountain near Loysburg in Bedford County, Pennsylvania, United States.

Yellow Creek flows eastward through the gap towards its junction with the Raystown Branch of the Juniata River. Periglacial boulder fields are present on both sides of the water gap, and the boulders are formed of the Silurian Tuscarora Formation.
