= Cumberland Bone Cave =

Fossil-filled cave on the outskirts of Cumberland, Maryland, US

Coordinates: 39°41′29″N 78°47′18.5″W

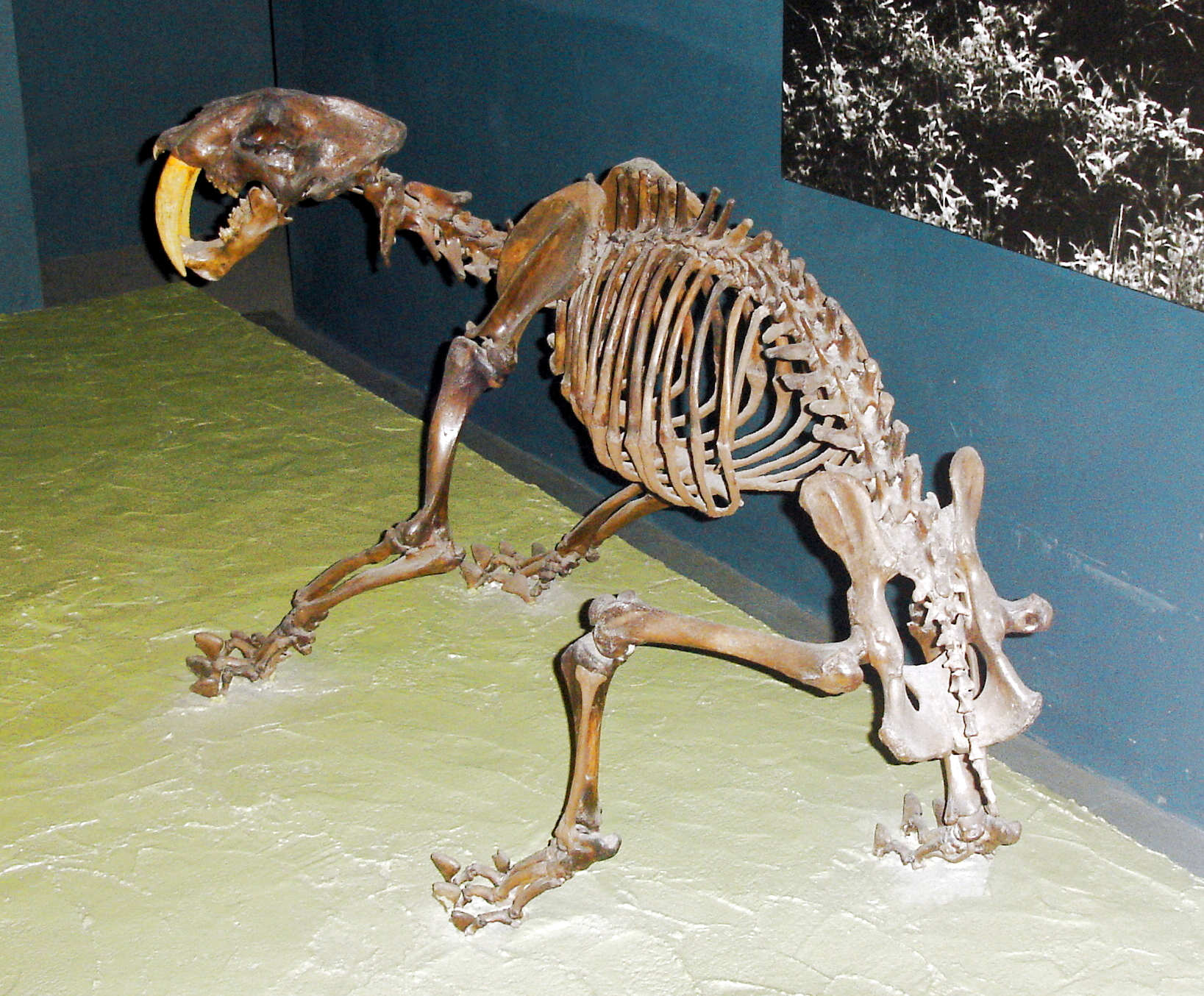
fossilized skeleton of a Smilodon californicus on display at the Smithsonian Museum of Natural History.

The Cumberland Bone Cave is a fossil-filled cave along the western slope of Wills Mountain on the outskirts of Cumberland, Maryland near Corriganville in Allegany County, Maryland.

== History and paleontology ==
In 1912 workers excavating a cut for the Western Maryland Railway along Andy's Ridge broke into the partly filled cave. A local naturalist, Raymond Armbruster, observed fossil bones among the rocks that had been blasted loose and were being removed from the cut. Armbruster notified paleontologists at the Smithsonian Institution, and James W. Gidley began excavating that same year. The cave later became known as the "Cumberland Bone Cave".

Between 1912 and 1916, Gidley excavated the Cumberland Bone Cave, where 41 genera of mammals were found, about 16 per cent of which are extinct. Numerous excellent skulls and enough bones to reconstruct skeletons for a number of the species were present. Skeletons of the short-faced bears and an extinct saber-toothed cat from the Bone Cave are on permanent exhibit in the Ice Age Mammal exhibit at the National Museum of Natural History, Smithsonian Institution in Washington, DC. Many of the fossilized bones date from 200,000 years ago. The Cumberland Bone cave represents one of the finest Pleistocene-era faunas known from eastern North America.

Today very little of this cave is still in existence, though some excavations are still being performed by the Maryland DNR. The remains can be seen on the south wall of the cut, at the same level of the neighboring railbed, and at the top of the north wall. The connecting chambers and passages have been removed. The Cumberland Bone Cave is developed in the vertical planes of the Keyser Limestone at an elevation of 840 feet (260 m).
