= Martin Hill (Pennsylvania) =

Mountain ridge in Bedford County, Pennsylvania, United States

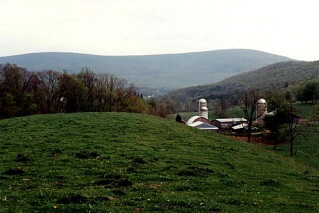
- Martin Hill

Highest point
- Elevation: 2,775 ft (846 m) NGVD 29
- Coordinates: 39°50′52″N 78°33′33″W

Geography
- Location within Pennsylvania
- Location: Bedford County, Pennsylvania, U.S.
- Parent range: Appalachian Mountains
- Topo map: USGS Beans Cove (PA) Quadrangle

Climbing
- Easiest route: Road

Martin Hill is a mountain ridge which connects Tussey Mountain to its east and Evitts Mountain to its west. Martin Hill is located in the Martin Hill Wild Area, which is a part of the Buchanan State Forest, in Bedford County, Pennsylvania, United States. The summit of Martin Hill is one of the few in the Commonwealth which is void of any towers or transmitters; such equipment is located instead on a lesser nearby summit in the same mountain complex. Martin Hill is the second highest in Pennsylvania's Ridge and Valley Appalachians, the highest being Wills Mountain to its west at 2,780 ft (850 m).

== Flora and fauna ==
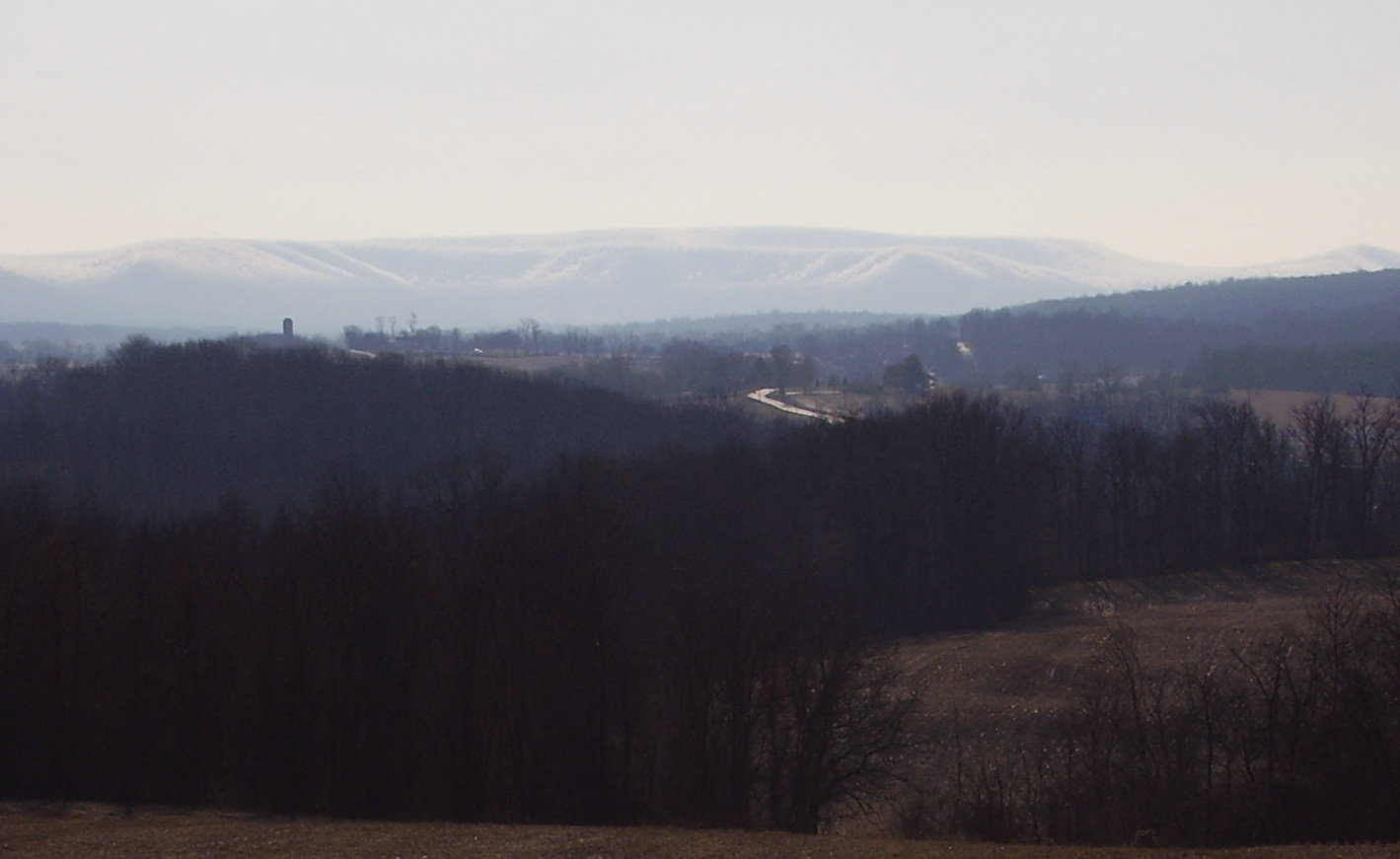
Martin Hill as viewed from the farms around Rainsburg

Martin Hill is a rugged mountain, with trails that run along the summit ridge and down its slopes. Wildlife on the mountain include bobcat, black bear, ruffed grouse, wild turkey, and the white-tailed deer.

Forests dominated by oaks and hickories characterize the mountain; other trees and shrubs include mountain laurel (Kalmia latifolia), white pine (Pinus strobus), and hemlock (Tsuga canadensis). Sassafras (Sassafras albidum), fire cherry (Prunus pensylvanica), and striped maple (Acer pensylvanicum) are found on the upper slopes of the mountain.

== Other information ==
The adjacent Sweet Root Natural Area provides 13,000-acre (53 km^{2}) acres of wildland, considered one of the most remote and serene in the Commonwealth.

The old forest fire lookout tower was removed in 2003. The views from that tower were beautiful: To the north one could see the ridges of both Evitts and Tussey Mountain fading into the distance. Blue Knob could be seen 30 miles (48 km) in the distance, rising behind Kinton Knob, the north end of Wills Mountain. To the east Sideling Hill was visible, including its deep road cut on I-68 in Maryland. To the south Dans Mountain in Maryland was visible, and to the west, the Wills Mountain highpoint and the Allegheny Front. Although this panoramic view is no longer available, rock screes and other overlooks in the Wild Area offer other sweeping vistas.

The former fire tower site on Martin Hill (829 m) is the highest point on Pennsylvania's longest footpath, Mid State Trail.
