= Yellow Creek (Juniata River tributary) =

River in Blair and Bedford counties in Pennsylvania, United States

Coordinates: 40°08′16″N 78°16′12″W

Yellow Creek is a 20.9-mile-long (33.6 km) tributary of the Raystown Branch Juniata River in Bedford County, Pennsylvania, in the United States.

Yellow Creek flows from Morrisons Cove through Loysburg Gap, a water gap in Tussey Mountain, before joining the Raystown Branch at Hopewell.

== Bridges ==
- The Halls Mill Covered Bridge crosses Yellow Creek in Hopewell.

== See also ==
- List of rivers of Pennsylvania
