= Halls Mill Covered Bridge =

- U.S. National Register of Historic Places
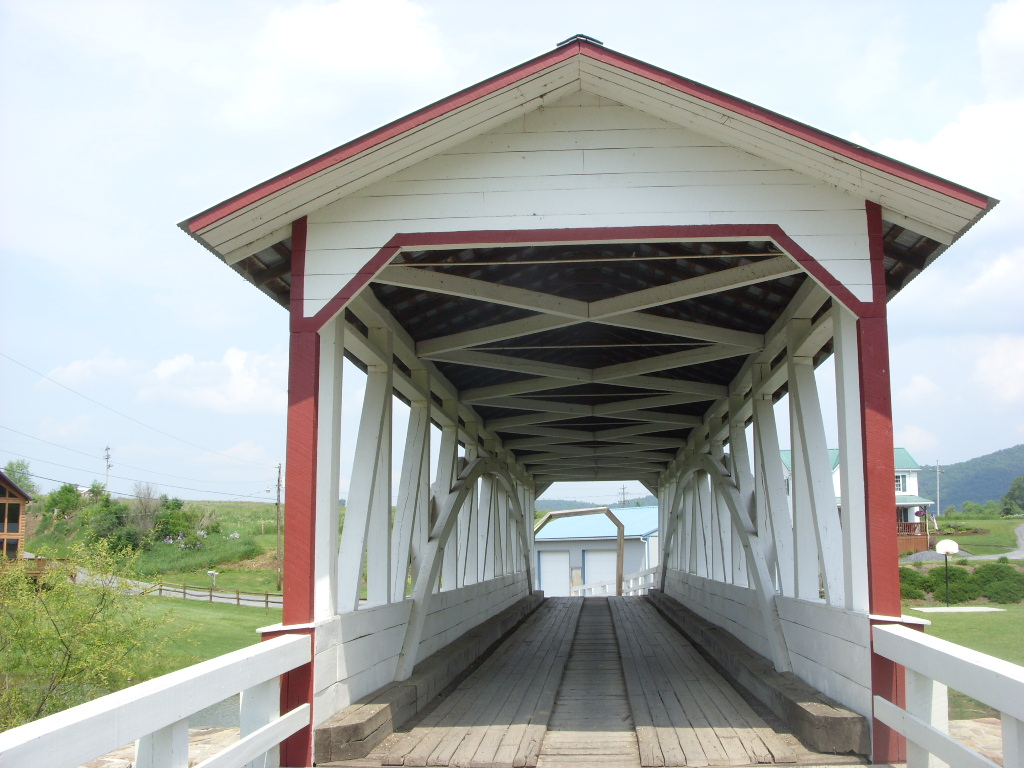
- Halls Mill Covered Bridge, May 2009

- Location within Pennsylvania Location within the United States
- Location: North of Everett on Township 528, Hopewell Township, Pennsylvania
- Coordinates: 40°7′27″N 78°19′2″W
- Area: less than one acre
- MPS: Bedford County Covered Bridges TR
- NRHP reference No.: 80003418
- Added to NRHP: April 10, 1980

The Halls Mill Covered Bridge is an historic, wooden covered bridge which is located in Hopewell Township in Bedford County, Pennsylvania.

It was listed on the National Register of Historic Places in 1980.

== History and architectural features ==
This structure is a 91-foot-long (28 m), Burr Truss bridge with a medium pitched gable roof, and was built in 1872. It crosses Yellow Creek, and is one of fifteen historic covered bridges in Bedford County.
