= Woodbury, Pennsylvania =

Borough in Pennsylvania, US

- Borough
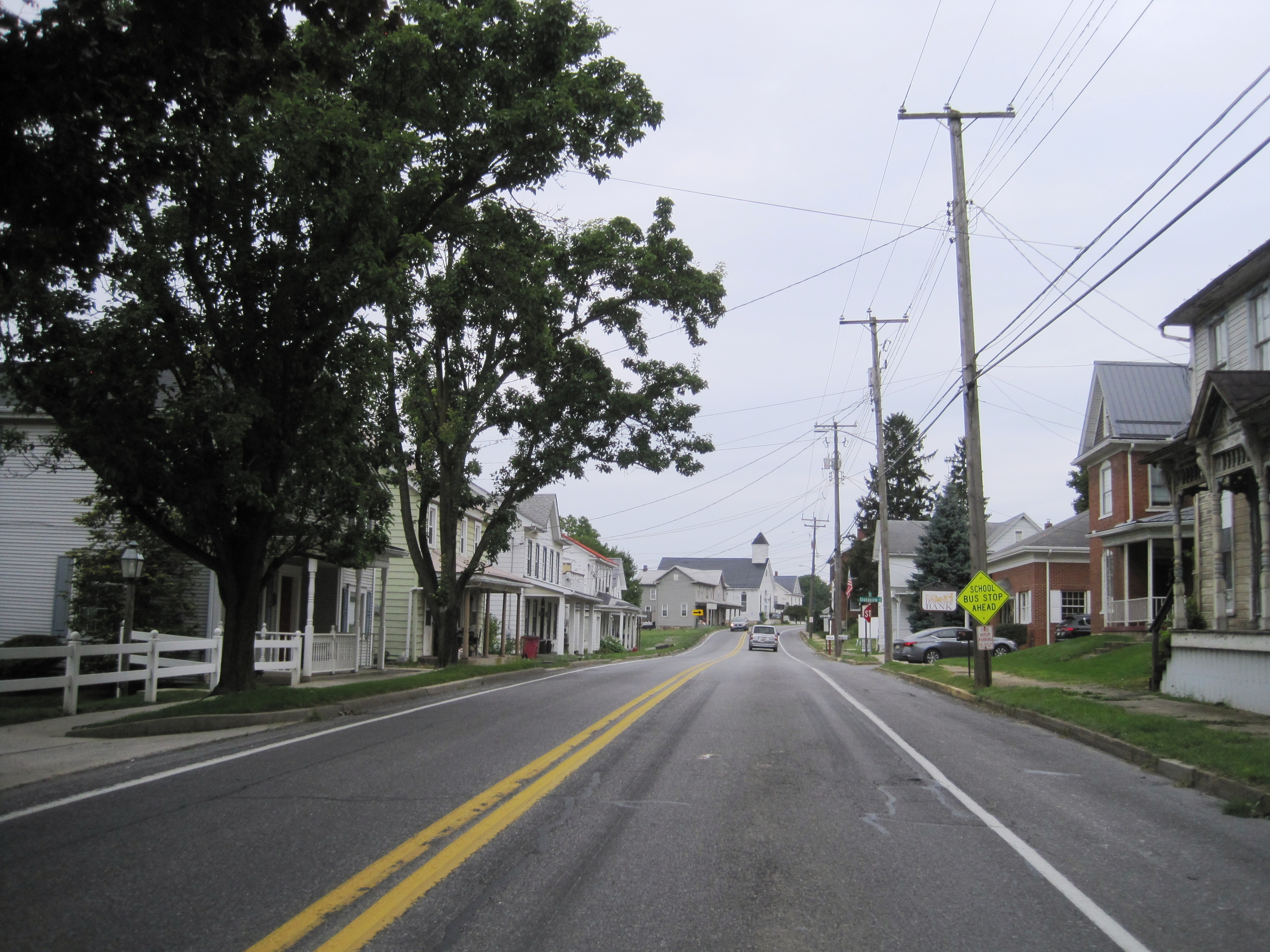
- Northbound along PA 36 (Main Street)

- Location of Woodbury in Bedford County, Pennsylvania.

- Location within Pennsylvania
- Coordinates: 40°13′31″N 78°21′57″W
- Country: United States
- State: Pennsylvania
- County: Bedford
- Settled: 1800
- Incorporated: 1868

Government
  - Type: Borough Council

Area
  - Total: 0.14 sq mi (0.35 km^{2})
  - Land: 0.13 sq mi (0.33 km^{2})
  - Water: 0.0077 sq mi (0.02 km^{2})
- Elevation: 1,161 ft (354 m)

Population (2020)
  - Total: 286
  - Density: 2,239.3/sq mi (864.58/km^{2})
- Time zone: UTC-5 (Eastern (EST))
  - Summer (DST): UTC-4 (EDT)
- Zip code: 16695
- Area code: 814
- FIPS code: 42-86128

Woodbury is a borough in Bedford County, Pennsylvania, United States. The population was 286 at the 2020 census.

== Geography ==
Woodbury is located in northern Bedford County at 40°13′31″N 78°21′57″W (40.225396, -78.365744). It lies in Morrison Cove, a broad valley between Tussey Mountain to the east and Dunning Mountain to the west. Pennsylvania Route 36 passes through the community, leading north 8 miles (13 km) to Roaring Spring and south 5 miles (8 km) to Loysburg.

According to the United States Census Bureau, Woodbury has a total area of 0.14 square miles (0.35 km^{2}), of which 0.008 square miles (0.02 km^{2}), or 4.61%, is water.

== Demographics ==
Historical population
Census	Pop.	Note	%±
1870	294		—
1880	281		−4.4%
1890	260		−7.5%
1900	226		−13.1%
1910	255		12.8%
1920	246		−3.5%
1930	186		−24.4%
1940	271		45.7%
1950	254		−6.3%
1960	280		10.2%
1970	298		6.4%
1980	267		−10.4%
1990	239		−10.5%
2000	269		12.6%
2010	284		5.6%
2020	286		0.7%
2021 (est.)	285	▼	−0.3%
U.S. Decennial Census

As of the census of 2000, there were 269 people, 104 households, and 82 families residing in the borough. The population density was 2,518.5 inhabitants per square mile (972.4/km^{2}). There were 114 housing units at an average density of 1,067.3 per square mile (412.1/km^{2}). The racial makeup of the borough was 98.88% White, 0.37% Native American, and 0.74% from two or more races.

There were 104 households, out of which 36.5% had children under the age of 18 living with them, 62.5% were married couples living together, 14.4% had a female householder with no husband present, and 20.2% were non-families. 20.2% of all households were made up of individuals, and 14.4% had someone living alone who was 65 years of age or older. The average household size was 2.59 and the average family size was 2.96.

In the borough the population was spread out, with 26.0% under the age of 18, 4.5% from 18 to 24, 27.5% from 25 to 44, 19.7% from 45 to 64, and 22.3% who were 65 years of age or older. The median age was 40 years. For every 100 females there were 78.1 males. For every 100 females age 18 and over, there were 73.0 males.

The median income for a household in the borough was $35,938, and the median income for a family was $41,250. Males had a median income of $25,000 versus $25,625 for females. The per capita income for the borough was $19,965. None of the families and 2.8% of the population were living below the poverty line, including no under eighteens and 6.9% of those over 64.
