= Evitts Mountain =

Mountain in Maryland, United States

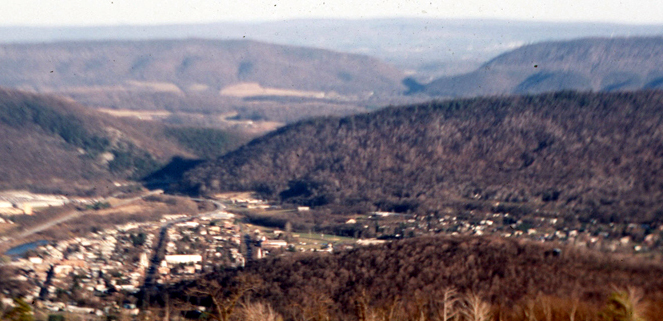
- Water gaps cut by the Raystown Branch of the Juniata River through Evitts Mountain and Tussey Mountain (background), looking east from Kinton Knob.

Highest point
- Elevation: 2,560 ft (780 m)
- Prominence: 1,280 ft (390 m)
- Coordinates: 40°9′N 78°29′W

Geography
- Location: Bedford County, Pennsylvania / Allegany County, Maryland, U.S.
- Parent range: Ridge-and-Valley Appalachians
- Topo map: USGS Bedford

Climbing
- Easiest route: Hike

Evitts Mountain is a stratigraphic ridge in the Ridge and Valley region of the Appalachian Mountains, located in Bedford County, Pennsylvania, and Allegany County, Maryland.

== Geography ==
The ridge line runs north from Rocky Gap State Park in Maryland, across the Mason–Dixon line into Pennsylvania and then to the west Martin Hill, passing very near Tussey Mountain in Snake Spring Valley. The ridge then turns west, wrapping around north of Bedford, Pennsylvania to its intersection with Dunning Mountain, dividing Dunning Cove from Morrison Cove. The Raystown Branch Juniata River passes through "The Narrows", a prominent water gap along with the Pennsylvania Turnpike and the now dismantled Bedford and Bridgeport Railroad near Bedford, Pennsylvania. Evitts Creek runs through the base of the Mountain in Rocky Gap State Park.

== Etymology ==
The mountain is named in honor of an early pioneer in Allegany County, Maryland, and Bedford County, Pennsylvania, thought by some to have gone by the last name of "Evart" (Evett, Evert, and Evit have also been proposed). In the 1780s, Mr. Evart decided to contemplate his bachelorhood from the isolated mountain top of what is today Evitts Mountain, at 39°43′13″N 78°39′35″W, now in Rocky Gap State Park, far from the comforts of society. At the top of the 2,000-foot (610 m) mountain lies what is allegedly Mr. Evart's old homestead, from which he would return by the same route every day hiking a steep 3.5-mile (5.6 km) trail, now called Evitts Trail. (At least one reference has Evitt dying before 1749.)

== Geology ==
See: Geology of Bedford County, Pennsylvania
