= Kinton Knob =

Mountain in Pennsylvania, United States

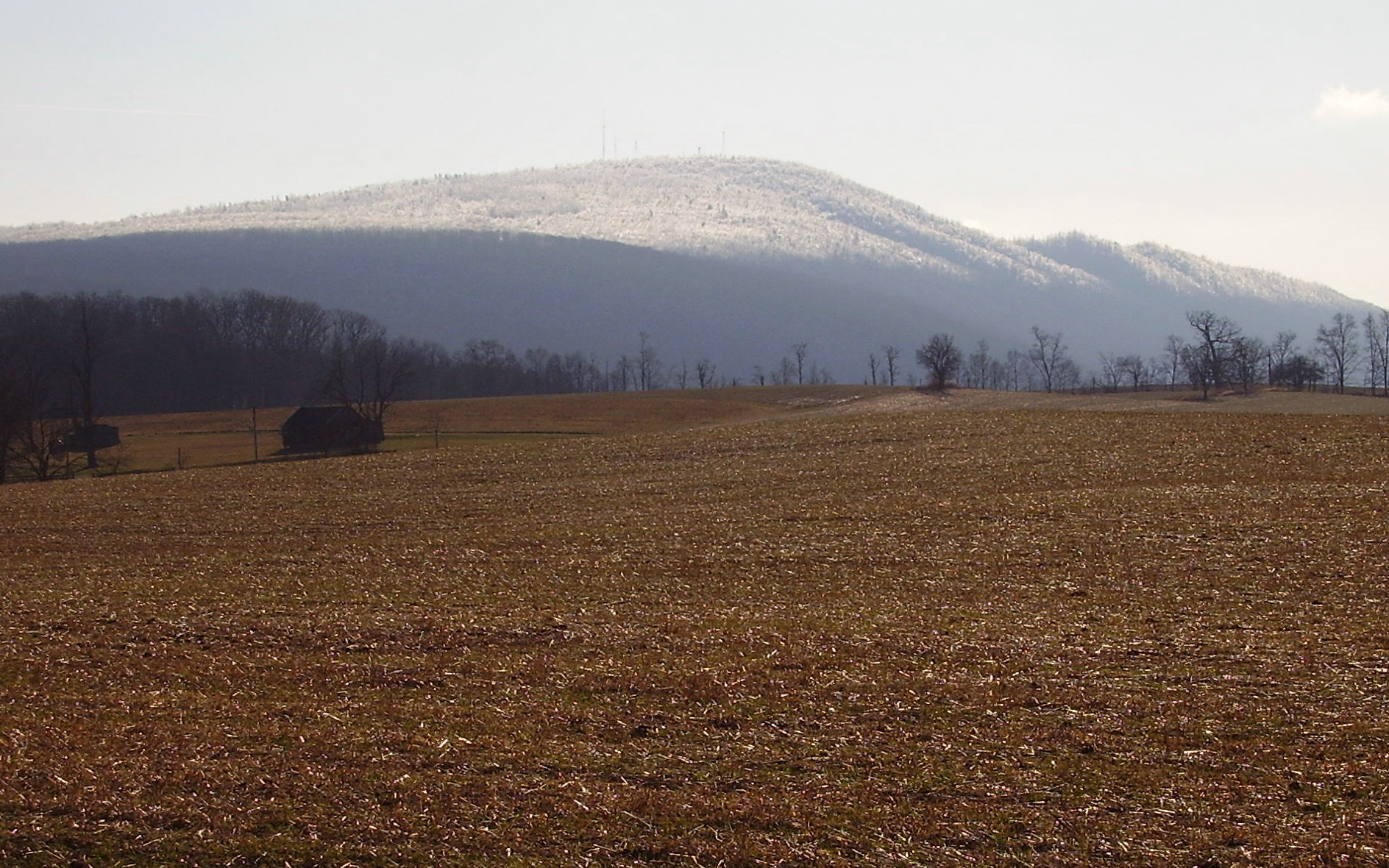
- Kinton Knob

Highest point
- Elevation: 2,540 ft (770 m)
- Coordinates: 40.01300°N 78.55426°W

Geography
- Location: Bedford County, Pennsylvania, U.S.
- Parent range: Appalachian Mountains
- Topo map: USGS Bedford (PA) Quadrangle

Kinton Knob is a peak that is located in Bedford County, Pennsylvania.

== Geography ==
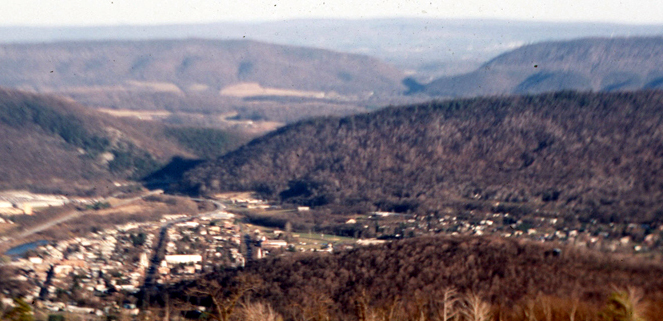
View from Kinton Knob summit of Bedford and water gaps through Evitts Mountain and Tussey Mountain

Kinton Knob marks the north end of Wills Mountain where it abruptly ends just southwest of the town of Bedford.

The mountain has an array of communication towers on its summit. Limited views are available from the top, especially in the winter season, of Blue Knob to the north and the Allegheny Front to the west.
