= Hopewell Township, Bedford County, Pennsylvania =

Township in Pennsylvania, US

Coordinates: 40°03′36″N 78°18′09″W

- Township
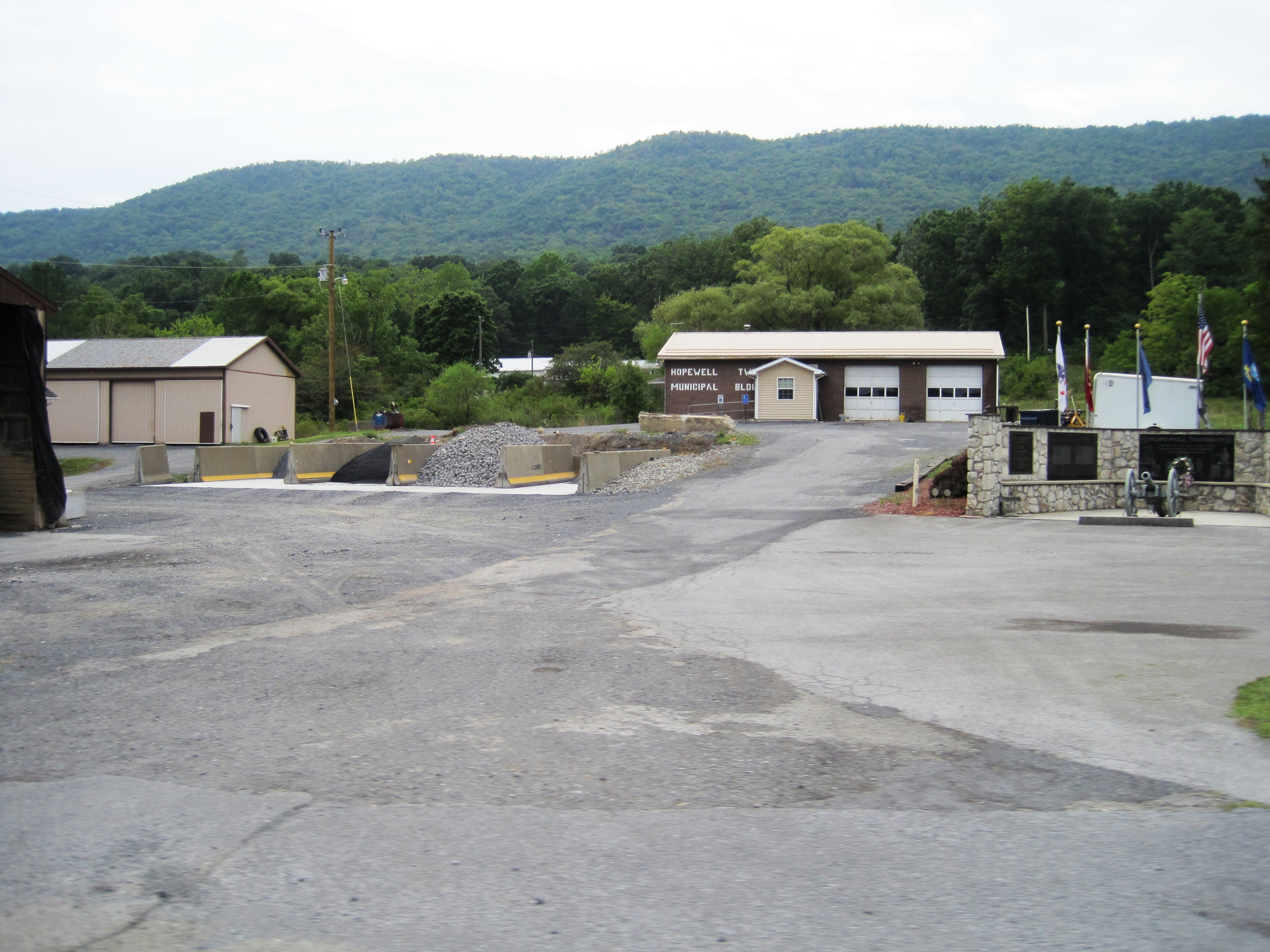
- Town hall

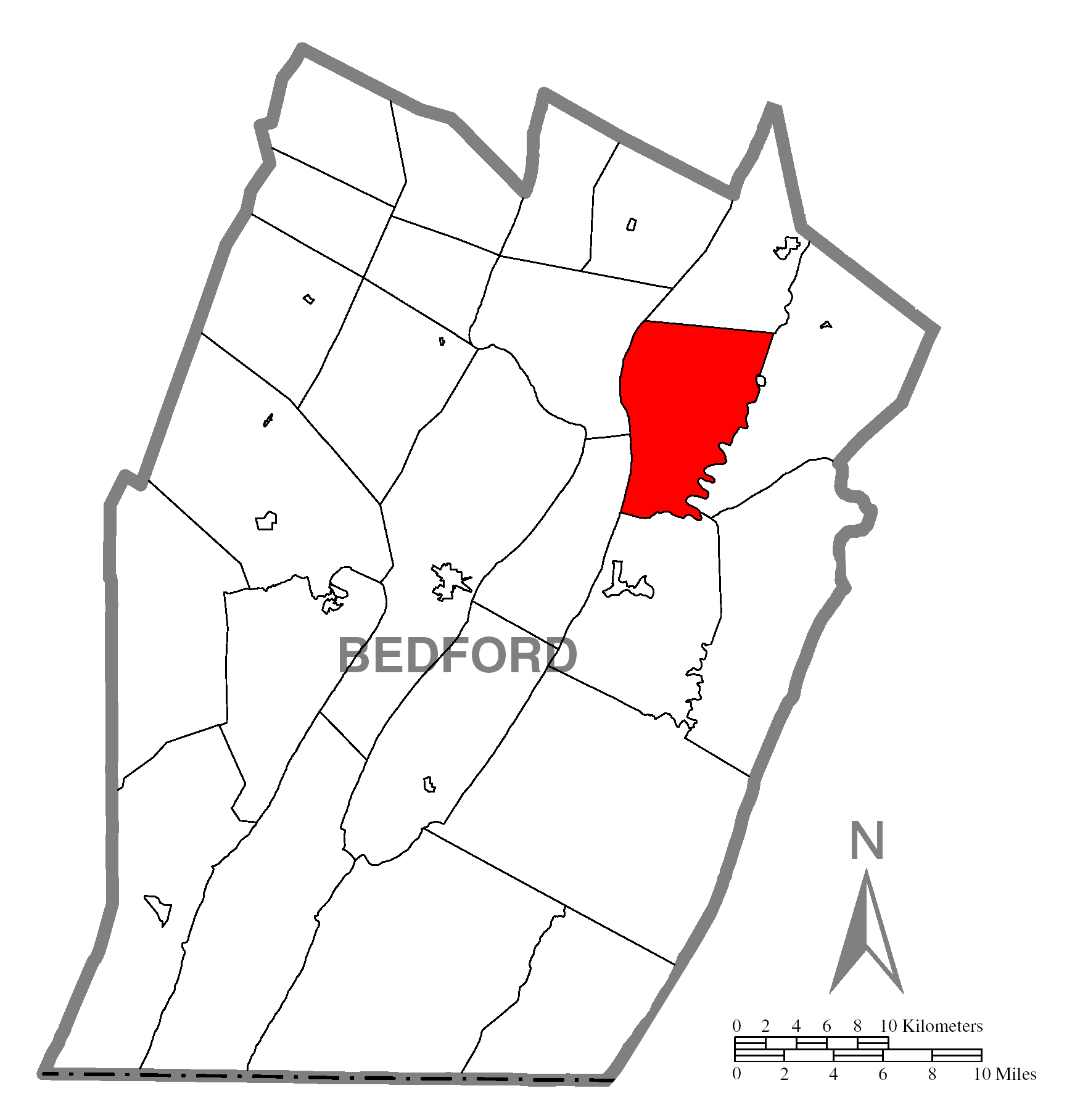
- Map of Bedford County, Pennsylvania highlighting Hopewell Township

- Map of Bedford County, Pennsylvania
- Country: United States
- State: Pennsylvania
- County: Bedford
- Settled: 1771
- Incorporated: 1773

Area
  - Total: 34.47 sq mi (89.27 km^{2})
  - Land: 34.20 sq mi (88.58 km^{2})
  - Water: 0.27 sq mi (0.69 km^{2})

Population (2020)
  - Total: 1,890 ▼
  - Estimate (2023): 1,868
  - Density: 57.5/sq mi (22.21/km^{2})
- Time zone: UTC-5 (Eastern (EST))
  - Summer (DST): UTC-4 (EDT)
- Area code: 814
- FIPS code: 42-009-35656

Hopewell Township is a township in Bedford County, Pennsylvania, United States. The population was 1,890 at the 2020 census.

== General information ==
- ZIP code: 16650
- Area code: 814
- Local telephone exchange: 928

== History ==
The Halls Mill Covered Bridge was listed on the National Register of Historic Places in 1980.

== Geography ==
Hopewell Township is located in northeastern Bedford County. It is bordered to the north by Liberty Township, to the east by Broad Top Township, to the south by West Providence Township, to the southwest by Snake Spring Township, and to the northwest by South Woodbury Township. The borough of Hopewell touches the eastern border of the township.

The western border of the township follows the crest of Tussey Mountain, and the eastern border follows the Raystown Branch of the Juniata River.

According to the United States Census Bureau, Hopewell Township has a total area of 34.5 square miles (89.3 km^{2}), of which 34.2 square miles (88.6 km^{2}) is land and 0.27 square miles (0.7 km^{2}), or 0.77%, is water.

== Recreation ==
Portions of the Pennsylvania State Game Lands Number 73 and 108 are located in the township.

== Demographics ==
Historical population
Census	Pop.	Note	%±
2010	2,010		—
2020	1,890		−6.0%
2023 (est.)	1,868		−1.2%
U.S. Decennial Census

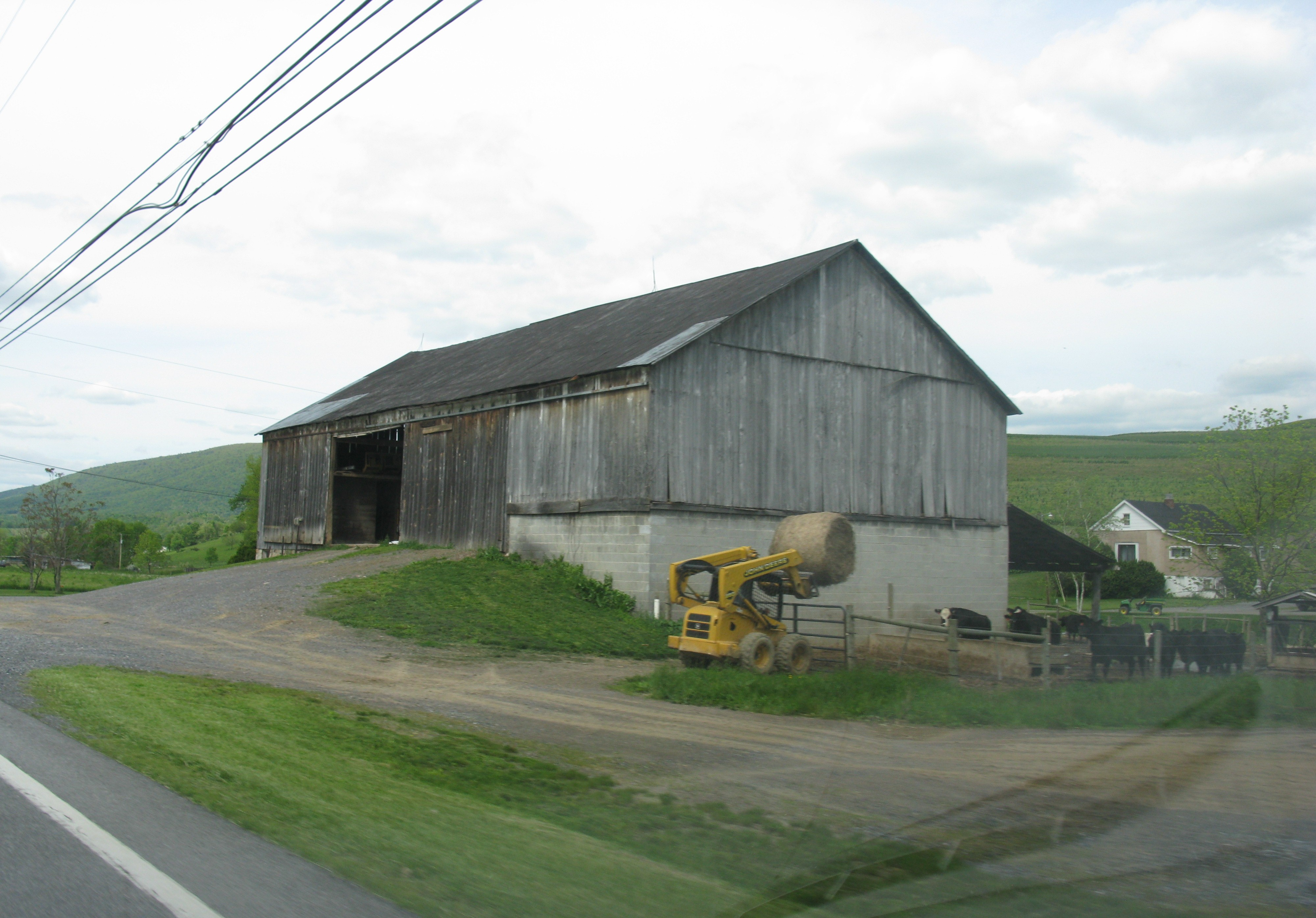
A farm in Hopewell Township

As of the census of 2000, there were 1,894 people, 746 households, and 555 families residing in the township. The population density was 55.4 inhabitants per square mile (21.4/km^{2}). There were 866 housing units at an average density of 25.3 per square mile (9.8/km^{2}). The racial makeup of the township was 99.21% White, 0.11% African American, 0.05% Native American, and 0.63% from two or more races. Hispanic or Latino of any race were 0.58% of the population.

There were 746 households, out of which 31.4% had children under the age of 18 living with them, 62.7% were married couples living together, 8.7% had a female householder with no husband present, and 25.5% were non-families. 22.5% of all households were made up of individuals, and 11.0% had someone living alone who was 65 years of age or older. The average household size was 2.54 and the average family size was 2.97.

In the township the population was spread out, with 23.6% under the age of 18, 6.9% from 18 to 24, 30.3% from 25 to 44, 25.2% from 45 to 64, and 14.0% who were 65 years of age or older. The median age was 39 years. For every 100 females, there were 96.3 males. For every 100 females age 18 and over, there were 91.4 males.

The median income for a household in the township was $34,620, and the median income for a family was $39,939. Males had a median income of $28,967 versus $21,250 for females. The per capita income for the township was $16,245. About 9.0% of families and 9.3% of the population were below the poverty line, including 8.8% of those under age 18 and 15.7% of those age 65 or over.
