= Fishertown, Pennsylvania =

Unincorporated community in Pennsylvania, US

- Unincorporated community
- Location within Pennsylvania
- Coordinates: 40°07′18″N 78°35′08″W
- Country: United States
- State: Pennsylvania
- County: Bedford
- Elevation: 1,161 ft (354 m)
- Time zone: UTC-5 (Eastern (EST))
  - Summer (DST): UTC-4 (EDT)
- ZIP code: 15539
- Area code: 814
- GNIS feature ID: 1174832

Fishertown is an unincorporated community in Bedford County, Pennsylvania, United States. The community is located along Pennsylvania Route 56, 8.3 miles (13.4 km) northwest of Bedford. Fishertown has a post office, with ZIP code 15539.
