= Dunning Mountain =

Mountain in Pennsylvania, United States

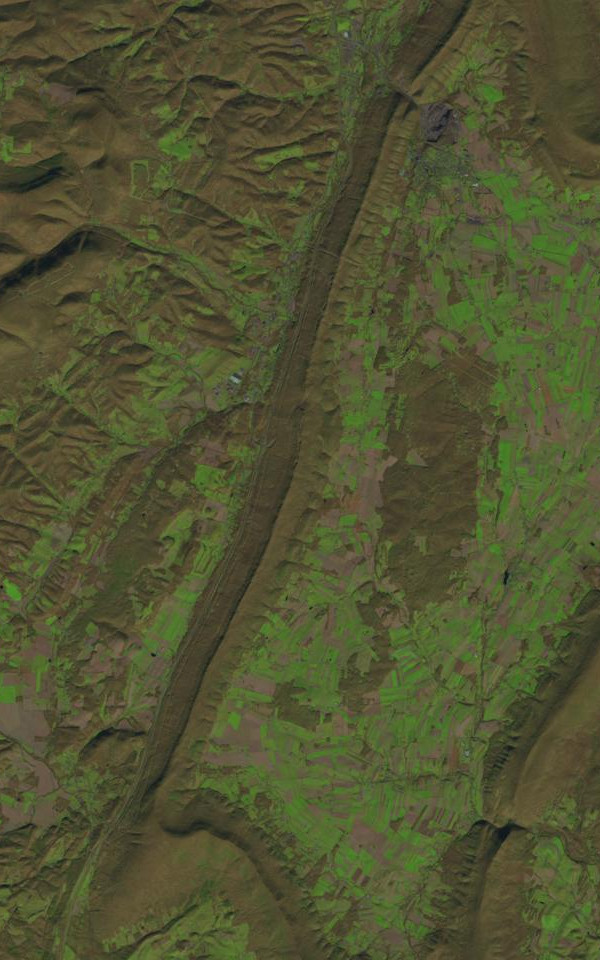
- 2016 Landsat image of Dunning Mountain

Highest point
- Elevation: 2,146 ft (654 m)
- Coordinates: 40°14′44″N 78°26′46″W

Geography
- Location: Pennsylvania, U.S.
- Parent range: Appalachian Mountains
- Topo map(s): USGS New Enterprise (PA) Quadrangle and Roaring Spring (PA) Quadrangle

Dunning Mountain is a stratigraphic ridge in central Pennsylvania, United States. The mountain's north end is at McKee Gap, which separates it from Short Mountain, and where Halter Creek flows westward towards the Frankstown Branch of the Juniata River. The south end of the mountain is contiguous with Evitts Mountain, but is marked by a sharp bend to the east. The valley formed by the bend is known as "The Kettle," and the broad valley to the east of Dunning Mountain is called Morrisons Cove. The town of Roaring Spring is located at the north end of the mountain on the east side.

Route 869 crosses southern Dunning Mountain from Imler to Brumbaugh, and Route 1042 (Sproul Mountain Road) crosses it east of Sproul. Pennsylvania State Game Lands Number 147 is located on Dunning Mountain in several parcels from the Juniata River south to the slopes adjacent to Roaring Spring

== Geology ==
Dunning Mountain is in the Ridge and Valley province of the Appalachian Mountains. It forms the west limb of a broad anticline, and Tussey Mountain forms the east limb. The erosion-resistant Silurian Tuscarora Formation, a quartzite, outcrops along the crest of the ridge.

== See also ==
- Geology of Bedford County, Pennsylvania
