= Keyser Formation =

Limestone bedrock unit in the Eastern United States

- Stratigraphic range: Pridoli-Lochkovian
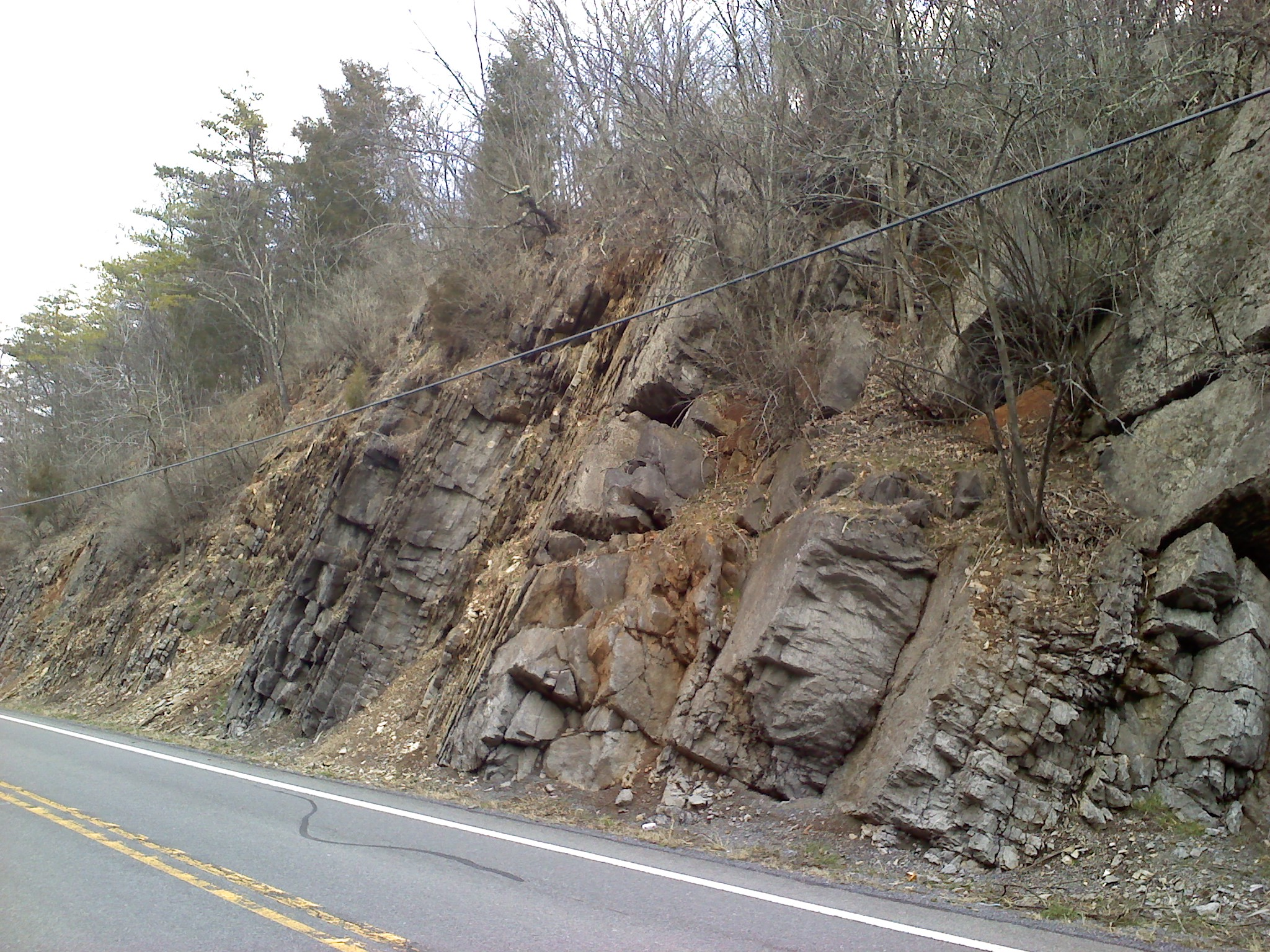
- Outcrop of the Keyser Formation on U.S. Route 522 in Fulton County, Pennsylvania, north of Warfordsburg
- Type: Sedimentary
- Unit of: Helderberg Group
- Sub-units: Byers Island, Jersey Shore & La Vale Members
- Underlies: New Creek Limestone and Old Port Formation
- Overlies: Tonoloway Formation
- Thickness: 33 m (108 ft) at Allegheny Furnace

Lithology
- Primary: Limestone

Location
- Coordinates: 38.3°N 79.6°W
- Approximate paleocoordinates: 36.3°S 41.5°W
- Region: Pennsylvania, Maryland, Virginia, West Virginia
- Country: United States
- Extent: Appalachian Mountains

Type section
- Named for: Keyser, West Virginia
- Named by: E. O. Ulrich
- Year defined: 1911
- Keyser Formation (the United States) Keyser Formation (Virginia)

The Late Silurian to Early Devonian Keyser Formation is a mapped limestone bedrock unit in Pennsylvania, Maryland, Virginia, and West Virginia.

== Description ==
The Keyser is a nodular limestone overlain by thick- and thin-bedded limestone and laminated limestone at its type locality in Keyser, West Virginia.

In central Pennsylvania, the basal "calico" limestone is a fossiliferous, medium-light- to medium-gray very thick bedded calcilutite containing numerous small irregular patches of clear calcite. The abundantly fossiliferous, nodular limestone at the base overlies the "calico". Overlying this is 5 to 6 m of fragmental calcarenite containing abundant crinoid columnals. Above the calcarenite is 6 m of fossiliferous, banded calcisiltite. The uppermost 15 m is a sequence alternating between laminated, stromatolitic calcisiltite, and calcilutite and calcisiltite that are argillaceous and fossiliferous.

=== Depositional environment ===
The depositional environment of the Keyser is interpreted as shallow marine and tidal flats, occurring in cycles.

=== Stratigraphy ===
Contact with Tonoloway Formation is probably conformable, but sharp enough to suggest an unconformity. Upper contact with the Old Port Formation is conformable.

The Keyser was divided into three members by J. W. Head in 1972. These are, from lowest to highest, the Byers Island Member, Jersey Shore Member, and La Vale Member. The type locality of the Byers Island Member is at Selinsgrove, Pennsylvania, where it is 93 feet thick. The type locality of the Jersey Shore Member is at Jersey Shore, Lycoming County, Pennsylvania. The type locality of the La Vale Member is at the Corriganville quarry, Allegany County, Maryland, and is named for the nearby town of La Vale. This nomenclature is accepted by the USGS.

In Virginia and West Virginia the Keyser is divided into Upper and Lower Members by the Big Mountain Shale Member.

=== Fossil content ===
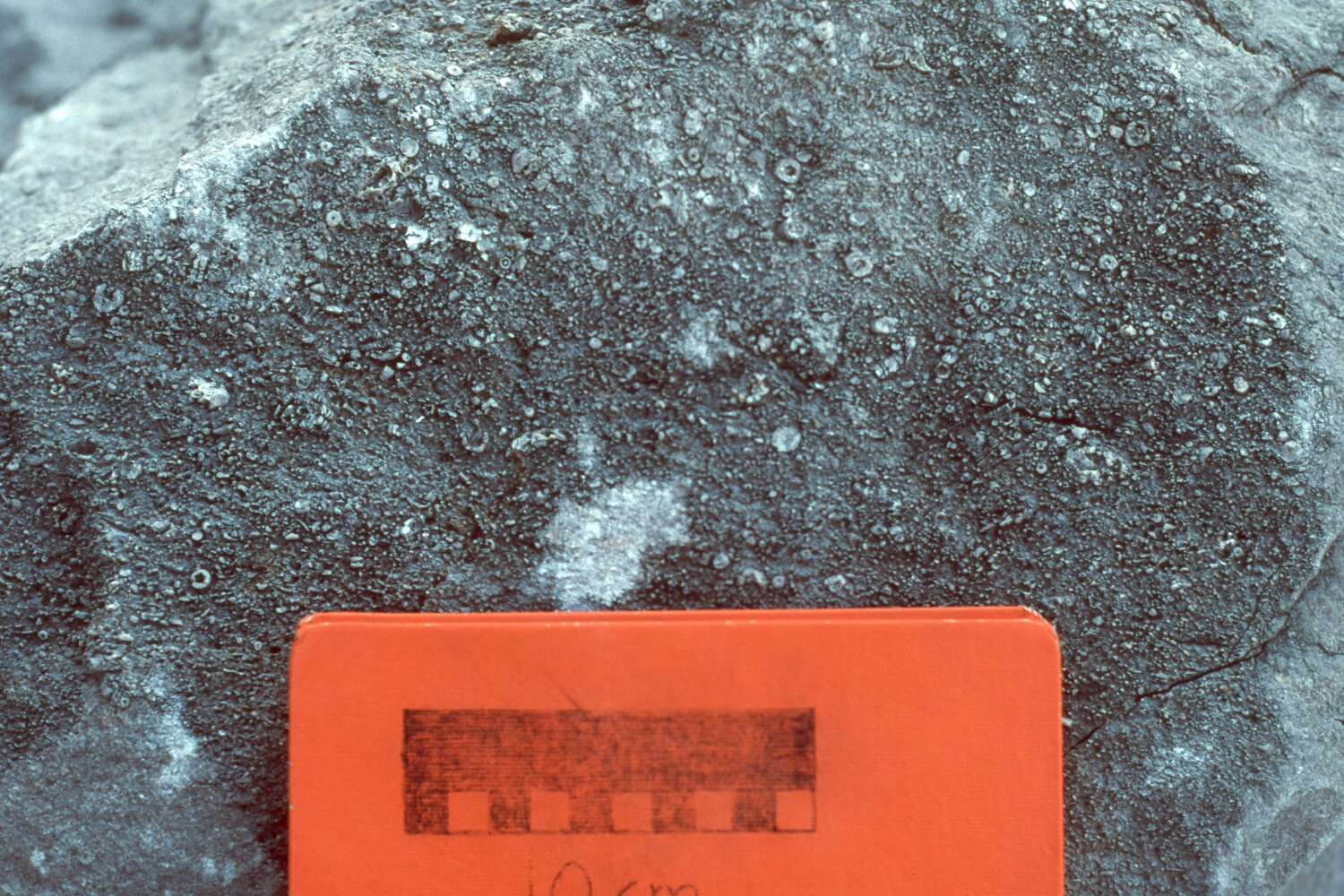
Crinoid fragments at the Old Eldorado Quarry outcrop along I-99, Blair County, PA

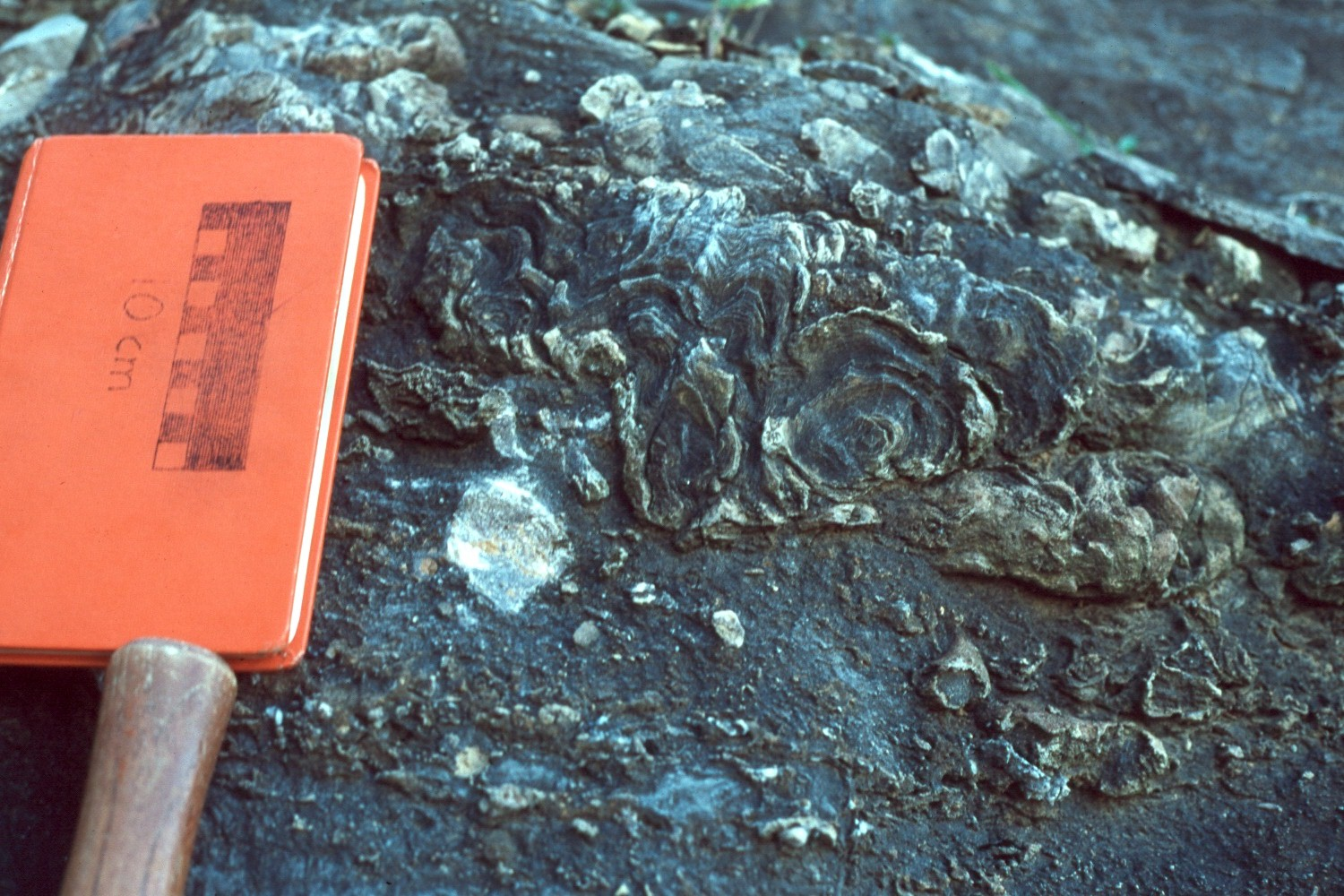
Stromatoporoids at the Old Eldorado Quarry outcrop along I-99, Blair County, PA

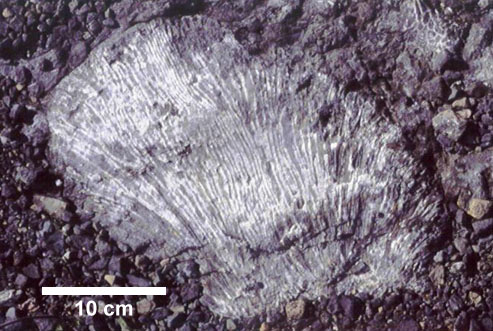
Tabulate coral in the New Enterprise New Paris Quarry on Chestnut Ridge in Bedford County, PA. Probably Halysites.

- crinoid columnals
- stromatoporoids
- Brachiopods
- Tabulate corals
- Conodonts: Icriodus woschmidti, Oulodus elegans, O. cristagalli

=== Notable outcrops ===
- Keyser, West Virginia (type section), quarry and roadcut east of the town, on West Virginia.
- Old Eldorado Quarry, at Mile Marker 30 along I-99/U.S. Route 220 in Blair County, Pennsylvania
- Alleghany Furnace Quarry, Altoona, Pennsylvania
- St. Clairsville/Osterburg Exit of I-99 in Bedford County, Pennsylvania (nearly vertical orientation)
- Abandoned quarry in Tyrone, Pennsylvania
- Quarry at Canoe Creek, Pennsylvania
- New Enterprise New Paris Quarry, Chestnut Ridge, Bedford County, Pennsylvania
- Roadcut along U.S. Route 30 (Everett bypass) through Warrior Ridge, Bedford County, Pennsylvania
- Strait Creek section on County Road 629, 1.5 miles south of U.S. Route 220, Strait Creek, Highland County, Virginia
- Smoke Hole section on West Virginia Route 2, 1.5 miles west of U.S. Route 220, Pendleton County, West Virginia

== Age ==
Relative age dating places the Keyser in the late Silurian to early Devonian, with the transition occurring near the top of the formation. Denkler and Harris used conodont biostratigraphy to confirm this.

== See also ==
- List of types of limestone
- Cumberland Bone Cave
