= Tussey Mountain =

Stratigraphic ridge in central Pennsylvania

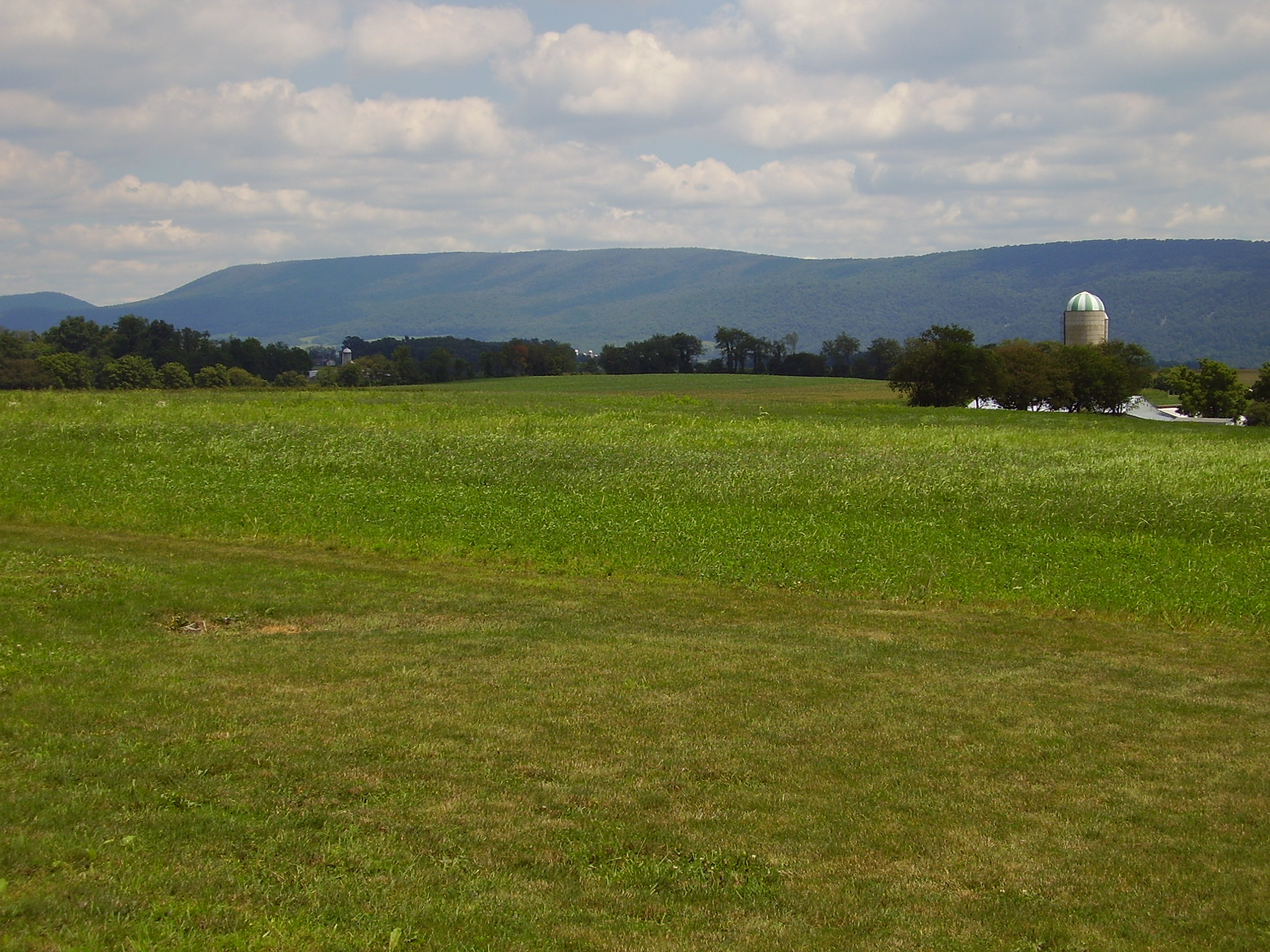
- Tussey Mountain Ridge seen from New Enterprise, Pennsylvania

Highest point
- Elevation: 2,740 ft (840 m)(at Martin Hill)
- Coordinates: 40°12′36″N 78°19′56″W

Geography
- Location: Pennsylvania, U.S.
- Parent range: Appalachian Mountains
- Topo map: USGS Hopewell (PA) Quadrangle

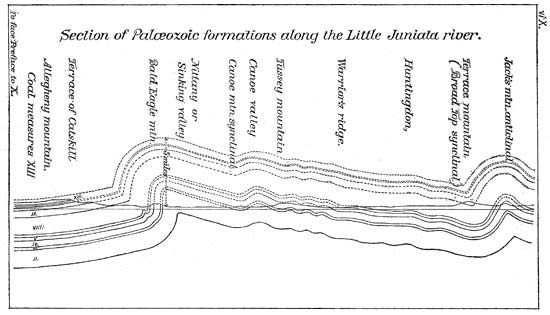
Geologic cross section along the Little Juniata River

Tussey Mountain is a stratigraphic ridge in central Pennsylvania, United States, trending east of the Bald Eagle, Brush, Dunning and Evitts Mountain ridges. Its southern foot just crosses the Mason–Dixon line near Flintstone, Maryland, running north 130 km (80 mi) to the Seven Mountains of central Pennsylvania, near Tusseyville, making it one of the longest named ridges in this section of the Ridge-and-valley Appalachians.

The ridge line separates Morrison Cove from the Woodcock Valley and Friends Cove from the Black Valley. Tussey Mountain lies in, and the ridge line forms parts of the borders of, Centre, Blair, Bedford and Huntingdon counties.

The Flintstone Creek runs around the southern end of the mountain in Maryland. North of there, small streams run through deep gorges, the Sweet Root and Rainsburg Gaps, near Martin Hill. At Everett the Pennsylvania Turnpike, U.S. Route 30, and the abandoned Huntingdon and Broad Top Mountain Railroad follow the Raystown Branch Juniata River through a deep water gap known as The Narrows. The Yellow Creek runs through Loysburg Gap at Loysburg, Pennsylvania. Maple Run Road passes through a wind gap near Pulpit Hill and Coot Hill, heading west to Woodbury. Pennsylvania Route 164 runs east out of Martinsburg, and climbs the west slope with a switchback before crossing the crest.

The Frankstown Branch Juniata River runs north along the west foot of the ridge before turning east along U.S. Route 22 at Water Street, the river, road, and rail (the abandoned Petersburg Branch) crossing the ridge line through a water gap. The Little Juniata River passes through a nearby water gap at Spruce Creek along with the former Pennsylvania Railroad Main Line, which tunnels through a spur of the mountain to cut across a loop in the river. Galbraith Run passes through Galbraith Gap near the north end of the ridge, adjacent to the Tussey Mountain Ski Area in Boalsburg.

The Tussey Mountain Ridge is popular with soaring birds and glider pilots ridge soaring along its slopes. This ridge is part of a chain of ridges that stretch south to Tennessee. Tussey Mountain has been designated a Pennsylvania Important Bird Area (IBA), based primarily on its importance as a spring raptor migration site, but also as a long corridor of intact forest habitat, over 50% of which is publicly owned . It is one of the best sites in the eastern United States for viewing the migration of the golden eagle. Pennsylvania's longest footpath, Mid State Trail, is atop or closely parallels Tussey Mountain for nearly its entire length.

In Blair County, Tussey Mountain is sometimes called Huntingdon Mountain, as one reaches Huntingdon by crossing it going east. Conversely, in some parts of Huntingdon County it is called Williamsburg Mountain as one reaches Williamsburg by crossing it going west.

Pennsylvania State Game Lands Number 118 is located along Tussey Mountain in Blair and Huntingdon Counties.

== Geology ==
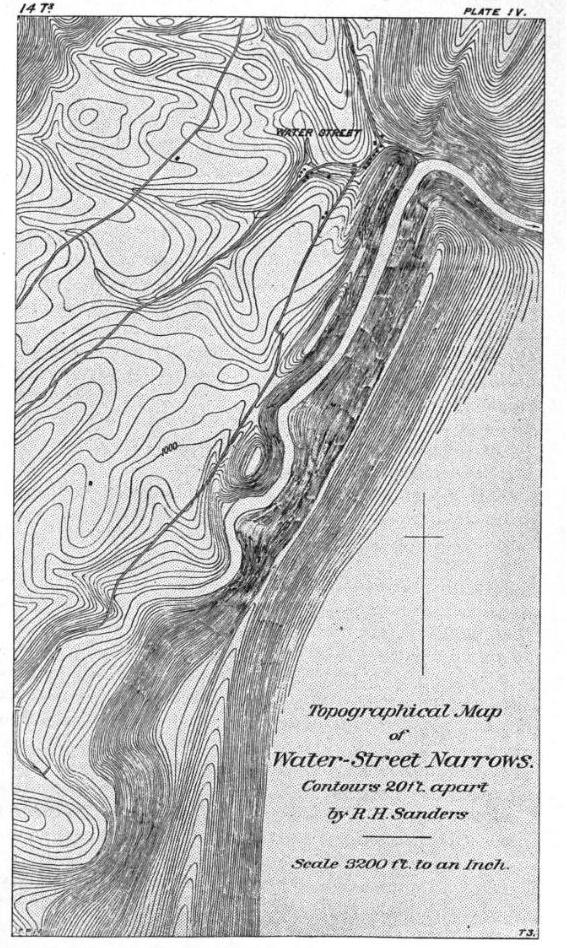
An 1885 topographical map of the Water Street Narrows

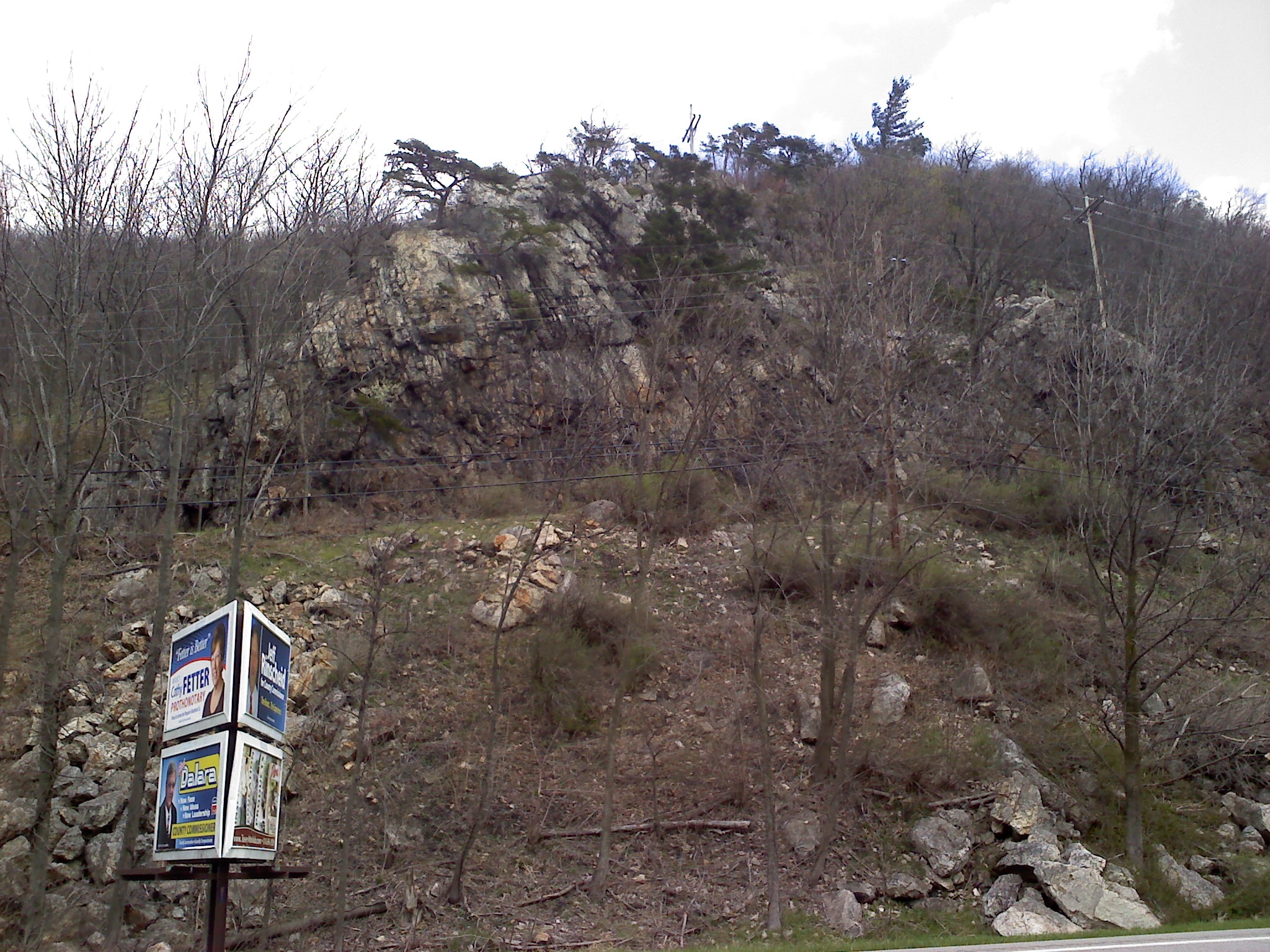
The Tuscarora Formation exposed on Tussey Mountain, where the Raystown Branch of the Juniata River and U.S. Route 30 pass through west of Everett

Tussey Mountain is in the Ridge and Valley province of the Appalachian Mountains. Brush Mountain, Mount Nittany and Bald Eagle Mountain ridges, are part of the same Paleozoic anticline rock formation consisting of older Ordovician Bald Eagle Formation Sandstone and Juniata Formation Shale, and younger Silurian Tuscarora Formation Quartzite. During the Appalachian orogeny, these layers folded up with the underlying and overlying layers into the Nittany Arch. The arch was a Himalayan scale mountain that towered above what is now Nittany Valley, where the oldest rock layers from deep within the eroded mountain are now exposed.

The Tuscarora Quartzite is more resistant to erosion than Bald Eagle Sandstone, and both are more durable than the Juniata Shale sandwiched in-between. Softer rock layers on either side of these eroded, leaving the double crested Tussey Mountain ridge, with a depression between the higher eastern and lower western ridge lines found on the northern section of the ridge. Since the rock layers on these ridges slope down to the east, the Tuscarora Formation underlies the higher crest, where it protected the east slope from erosion. Drainage from the upper slope has cut a series of small ravines in the lower ridge line, leaving a terraced lower slope in the Bald Eagle Formation. On the neighboring Bald Eagle, Brush, and Dunning Mountain ridges to the west that formed the opposite side of the ancient mountain, the same three rock layers are exposed in reverse order, with the oldest rocks in-between, near the hinge of the fold.

== See also ==
- Geology of Bedford County, Pennsylvania
