= Water gap =

Geological feature formed through a mountain

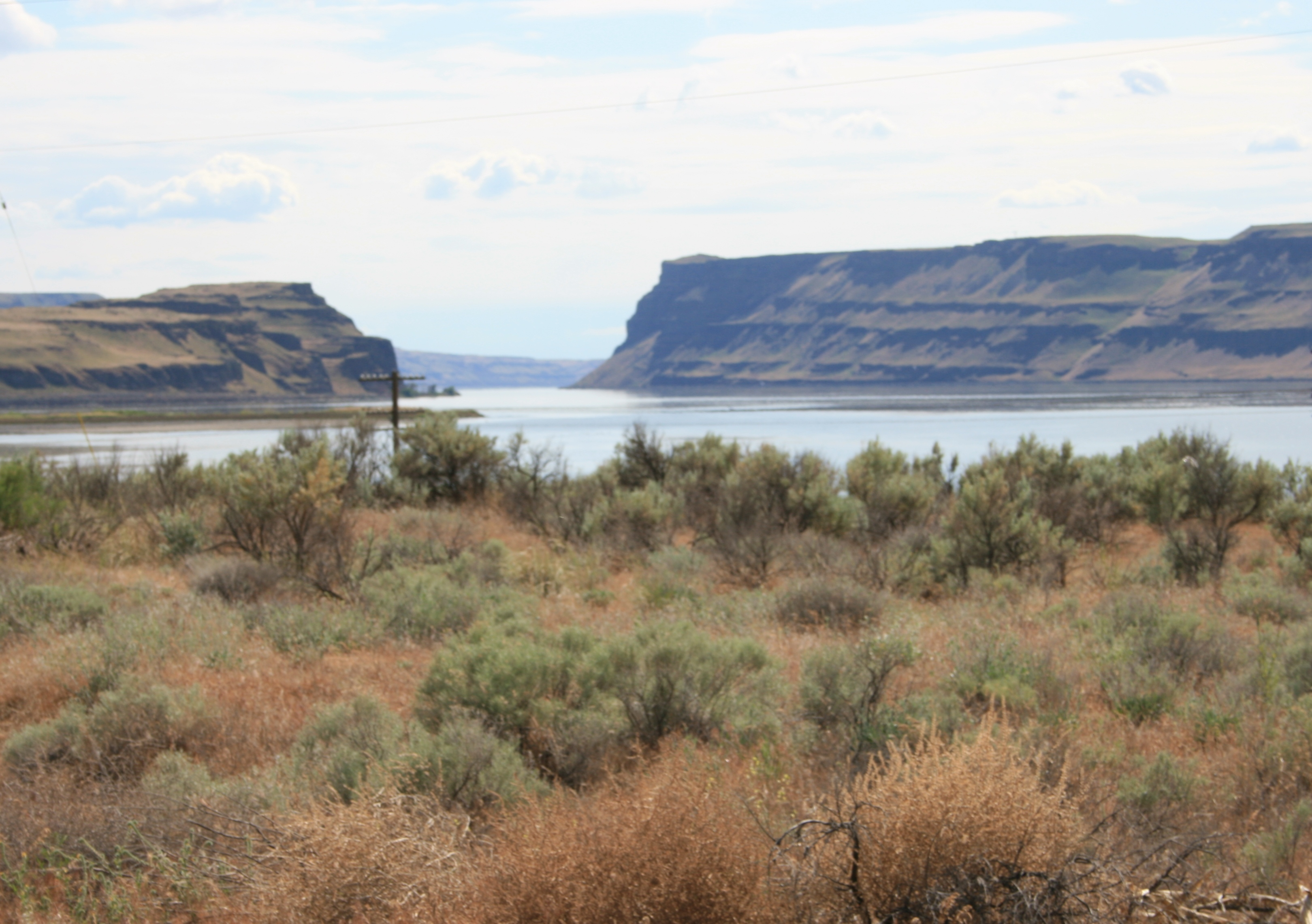
The Columbia River cut the Wallula Gap, seen from Main Street in Wallula, Washington

A water gap is a gap that flowing water has carved through a mountain range or mountain ridge and that still carries water today. Such gaps that no longer carry water currents are called wind gaps. Water gaps and wind gaps often offer a practical route for road and rail transport to cross the mountain barrier.

== Geology ==
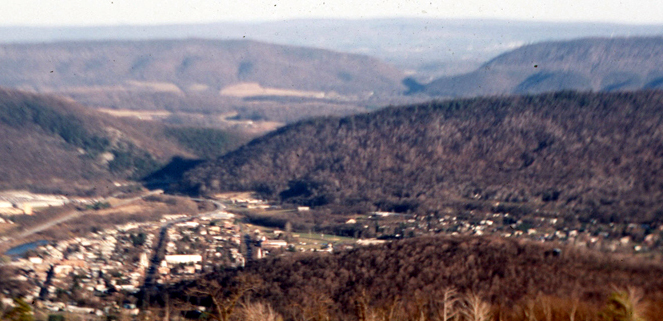
View of water gaps cut by the Raystown Branch of the Juniata River through Evitts Mountain and Tussey Mountain, facing west from the summit of Kinton Knob, Wills Mountain, in Bedford County, Pennsylvania, with the town of Bedford in the foreground

A water gap is usually an indication of a river that is older than the current topography. The likely occurrence is that a river established its course when the landform was at a low elevation, or by a rift in a portion of the crust of the earth having a very low stream gradient and a thick layer of unconsolidated sediment.

In a hypothetical example, a river would have established its channel without regard for the deeper layers of rock. A later period of uplift would cause increased erosion along the riverbed, exposing the underlying rock layers. As the uplift continued, the river, being large enough, would continue to erode the rising land, cutting through ridges as they formed.

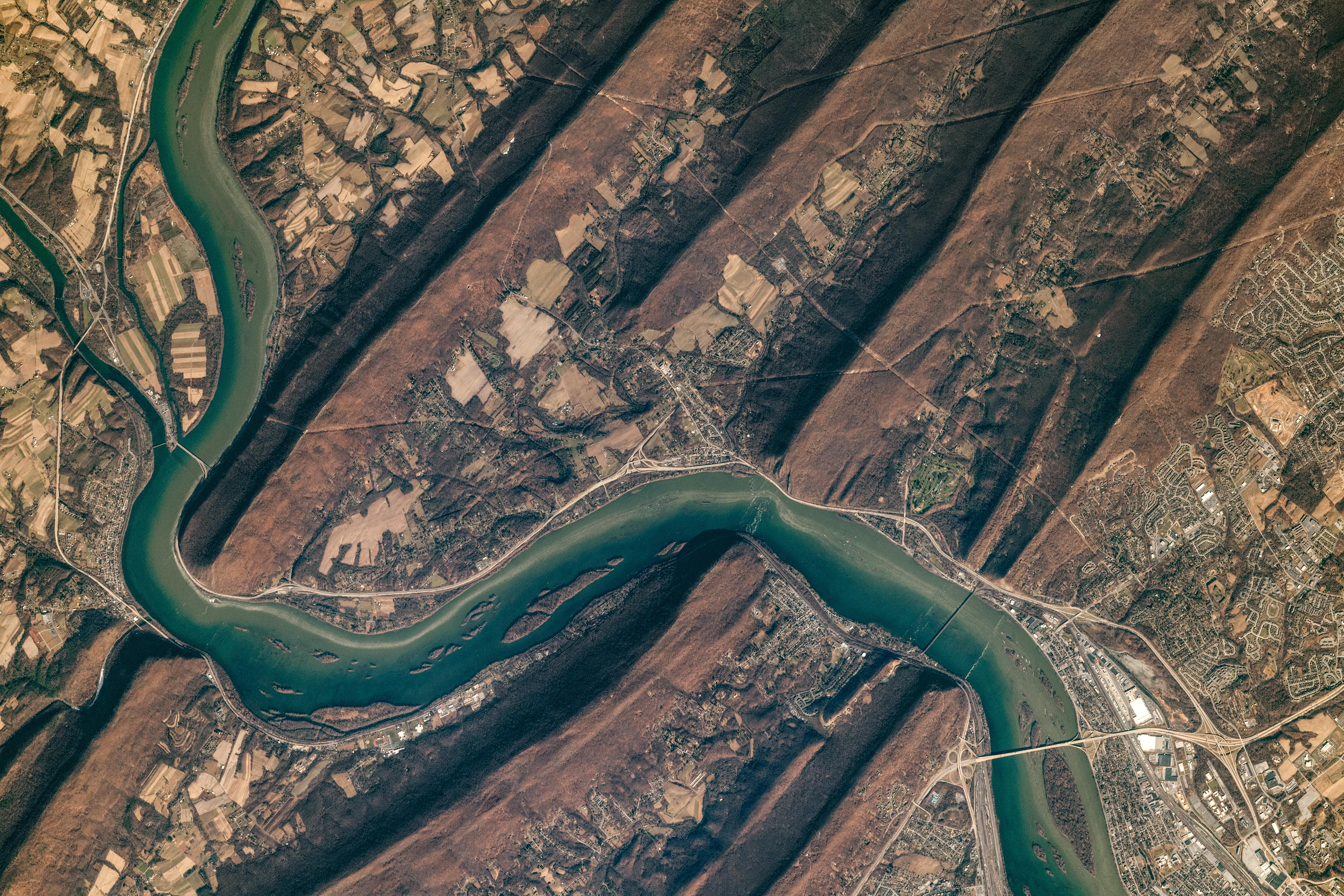
The Susquehanna River cuts through the folds of the Valley-and-Ridge province of the Appalachian Mountains. North is top left. Harrisburg, PA is visible in the bottom right corner.

Water gaps are common in the Ridge-and-Valley Appalachians of eastern North America.

Alternatively, a water gap may be formed through headward erosion of two streams on opposite sides of a ridge, ultimately resulting in the capture of one stream by the other.

== Notable examples ==
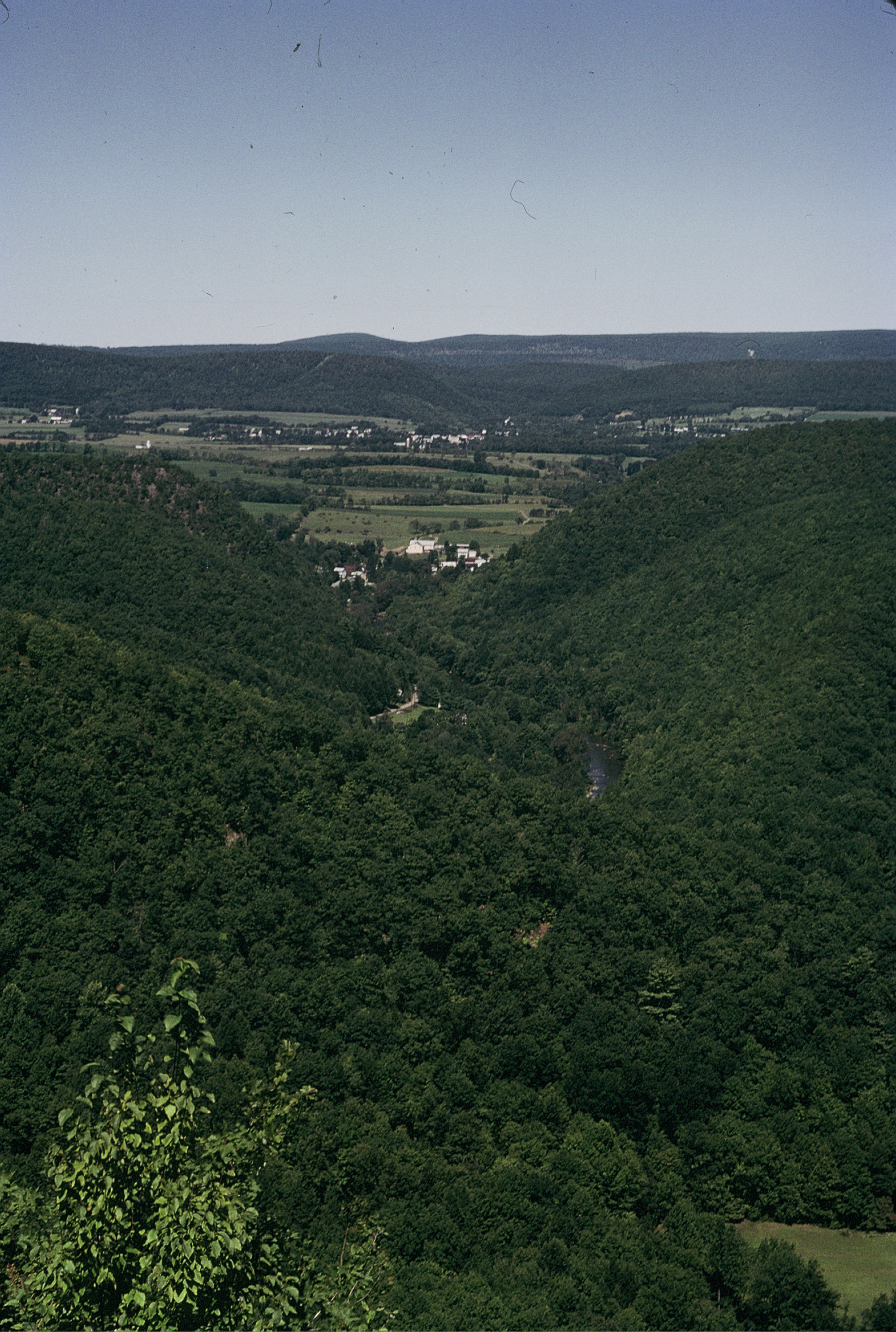
Two water gaps opened by the same river in central Pennsylvania, foreground and background, separated by settlements in flat lands

- Chicago Portage, Illinois - Saddle Point runs through the city itself.
- Columbia River Gorge, Oregon and Washington, and Wallula Gap, Washington, United States
- Cumberland Narrows, Maryland, United States
- Delaware Water Gap, New Jersey and Pennsylvania, United States
- Digby Gut, Nova Scotia, through which the Annapolis River flows into the Bay of Fundy
- Heavitree Gap, Alice Springs, Australia
- Iron Gates on the Danube River, forming the border between Serbia and Romania
- Kali Gandaki Gorge - cuts through the world's tallest mountain range, the Himalayas in Nepal
- Manawatū Gorge, New Zealand
- Middle Rhine in Germany
- Pongo de Mainique, Peru - on the Urubamba River
- Pongo de Manseriche, Peru - on the Marañón River
- Potomac Water Gap, United States
- Weltenburg Narrows on the Danube River in Bavaria
- Wawa Gorge, Rodriguez, Rizal, Philippines

== See also ==
- Antecedent drainage stream
- Defile (geography)
- Narrows
- Peneplain
