= Wills Mountain =

Mountain ridge in Maryland and Pennsylvania, United States

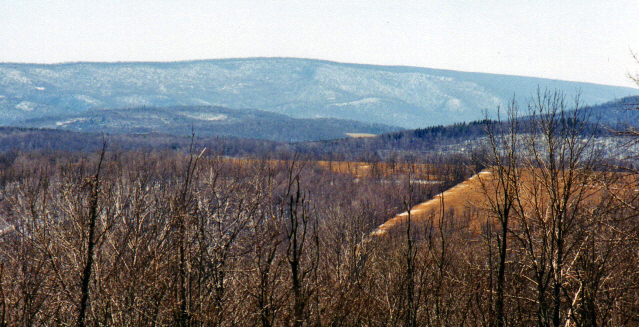
- Wills Mountain in Pennsylvania

Highest point
- Elevation: 2,790 feet (850 m)
- Prominence: 1,440 feet (440 m)
- Coordinates: 39°50.757′N 78°40.925′W

Geography
- Location: Bedford County, Pennsylvania / Allegany County, Maryland, U.S.
- Parent range: Allegheny Mountains, part of the Ridge-and-Valley Appalachians
- Topo map: USGS Hyndman (PA) Quadrangle

Climbing
- Easiest route: Jeep trail

Wills Mountain is a quartzite-capped ridge in the Ridge and Valley physiographic province of the Appalachian Mountains in Pennsylvania and Maryland, extending from near Bedford, Pennsylvania, to near Cumberland, Maryland. It is the northernmost of several mountain ridges included within the Wills Mountain Anticline.

== Geography ==
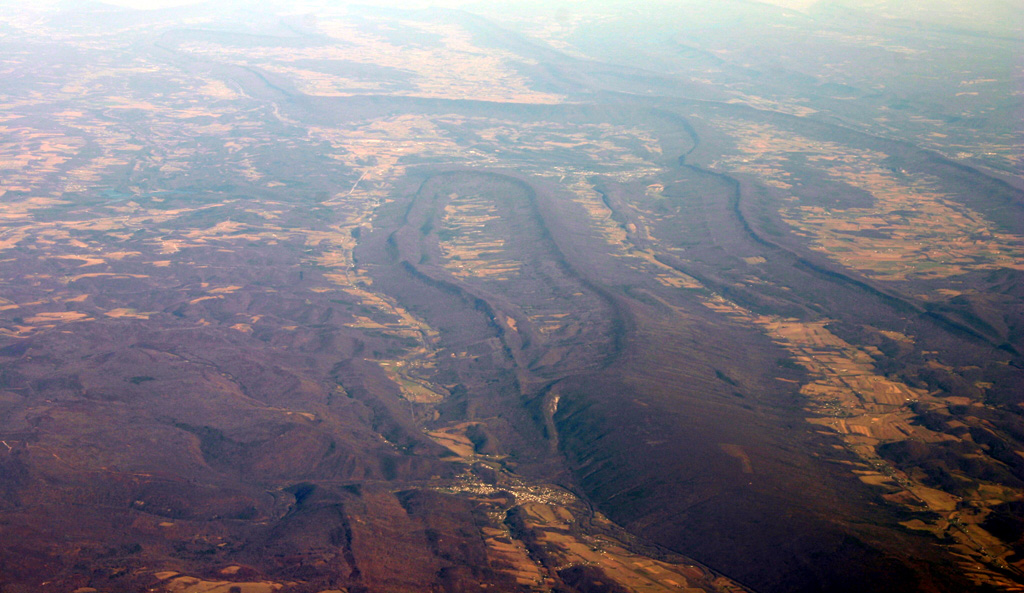
An aerial view of Wills Mountain (center) in Bedford County, Pennsylvania

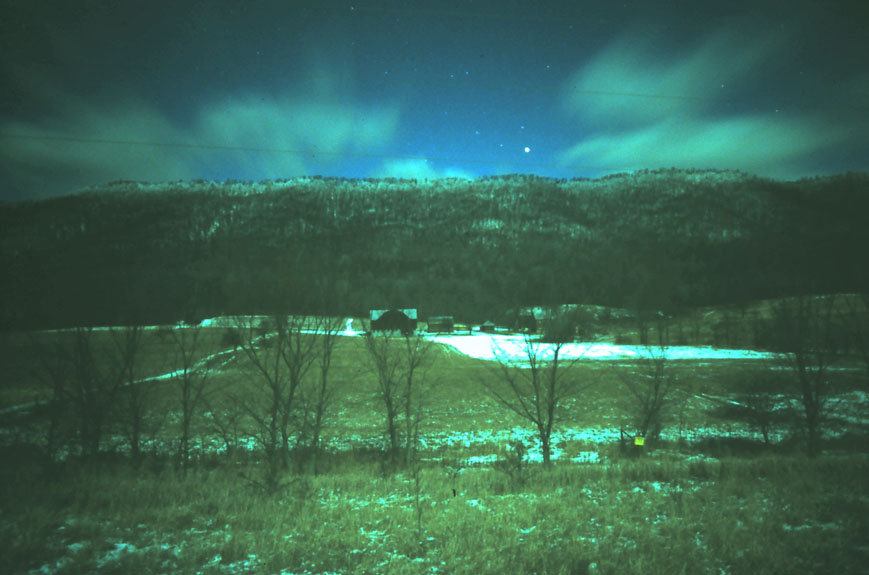
Wills Mountain at night, viewed facing west from US Route 220 south of Bedford, Pennsylvania

=== Pennsylvania ===
The Pennsylvania part of Wills Mountain is in Bedford County, reaching an elevation of 2,782 feet (848 m). Although there are mountains in Pennsylvania's Appalachian Plateau that are higher, Wills Mountain is the highest in its Ridge and Valley physiographic province. Wills Mountain may have the highest prominence in Pennsylvania. The mountain ridge begins abruptly near the Juniata River just north of 2,560-foot (780 m) Kinton Knob, west of Bedford, and just south of the Pennsylvania Turnpike. The valley to the south of Kinton Knob is known as Milligans Cove, an excellent geological example of a breached anticline.

Portions of Wills Mountain, including the summit, are located in Pennsylvania State Game Lands No. 48, where access to the mountain is limited, with only jeep trails and a gravel road on the ridge. The summit, like Martin Hill to the east, has no towers or transmitters. However, access to the summit is difficult, requiring a hike of more than 1,800 ft (550 m).

=== Maryland ===
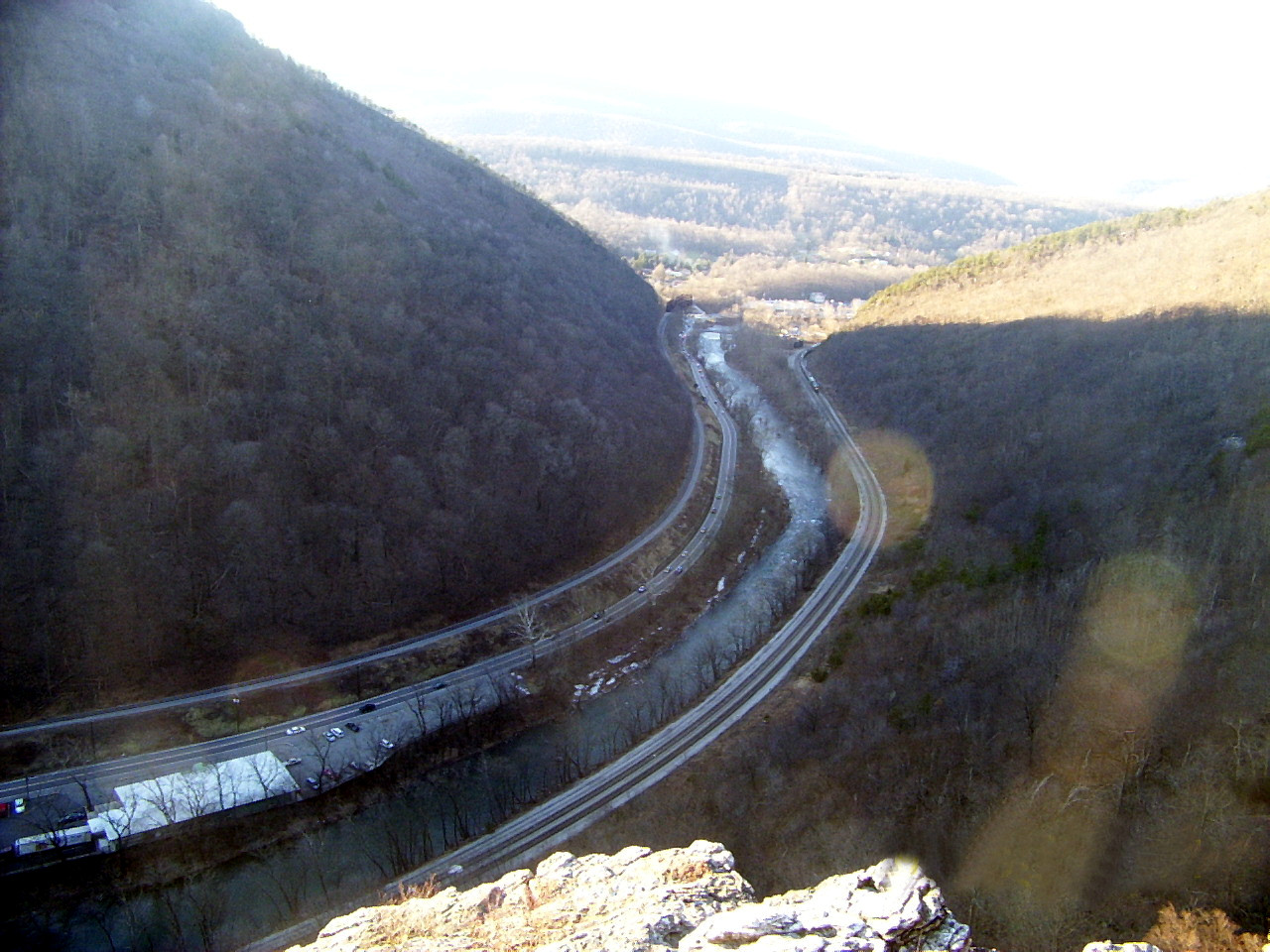
Cumberland Narrows west of Cumberland, Maryland, the water gap along Wills Creek through which the National Road crosses between Haystack Mountain (left) and Wills Mountain (right). This is the passage through the rugged Wills Mountain Anticline now used by the Western Maryland Scenic Railroad (left), Alternate U.S. Route 40 (center, left of the creek), and the CSX Railroad (right).

The Maryland part of Wills Mountain is located in Allegany County, where the mountain rises steeply from the Cumberland Narrows, a water gap west of Cumberland, half a mile (0.8 km) west of the mouth of Warrior Run. From there, the mountain extends northeasterly into Pennsylvania; the mountain's highest elevation in Maryland is 1,877 feet (572 m).

Haystack Mountain is on the south side of the Narrows. Geologically, the two mountains are equivalent, both being central ridges of the Wills Mountain Anticline. The Cumberland Narrows was carved into these quartzite-capped mountain ridges by Wills Creek, a Potomac River tributary, over millions of years.

The Cumberland Narrows serves as a western gateway from Cumberland to the Appalachian Plateau and the Ohio River Valley beyond. The Old National Road, now Alternate U.S. 40, passes through the Narrows, along with the former Baltimore and Ohio Railroad's main line between Baltimore/Washington and Pittsburgh, now part of the CSX system, and a former line of the Western Maryland Railroad, now used by the steam- and diesel-powered excursion trains of the Western Maryland Scenic Railroad and the Great Allegheny Passage bike trail.

A prominent rocky outcropping at the south end of Wills Mountain in the Cumberland Narrows is known as Lover's Leap.

== Geology ==
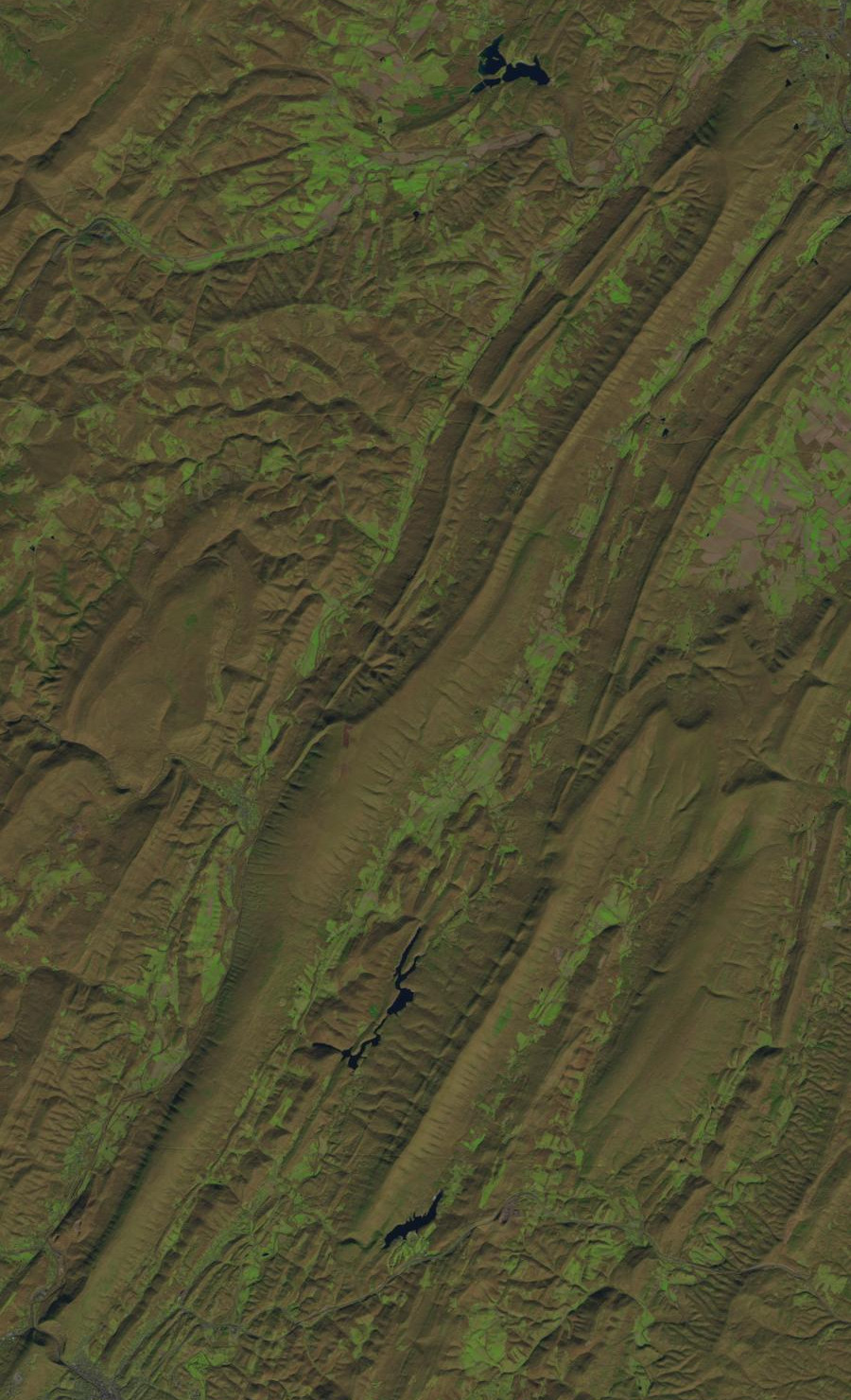
Landsat image of Wills Mountain in 2016

Wills Mountain is capped by the erosion-resistant Silurian Tuscarora quartzite. The mountain stands in the center of the Wills Mountain Anticline, a geological structure that extends from southern Pennsylvania through Maryland and West Virginia into Virginia. In this anticline, the Tuscarora and various other rock strata are bent upward, with the erosion-resistant Tuscarora capping the mountain's ridgetop, and more easily eroded Silurian limestones and shales on the mountain's slopes.

== See also ==
- Wills Mountain State Park
