= Taghanic event =

Extinction event in the Middle Devonian

Taghanic event 386 million years ago in Middle Devonian period
- 387.7 ± 0.8 – 382.7 ± 1.6 Ma

Chronology
- Preceded by: Kačák event
- Followed by: Late Devonian mass extinction

The Taghanic event (Taghanic unconformity, Taghanic crisis or Taghanic onlap) was an extinction event that occurred about 386 million years ago during the Givetian faunal stage of the Middle Devonian geologic period in the Paleozoic era. It was caused by hypoxia from an anoxic event. The event had a period in which dissolved oxygen in the Earth's oceans was depleted. The Taghanic event caused a very high death rate of corals. The loss of the coral reefs caused a high loss of animals that lived in and around the reefs. The extinction rate has been estimated between 28.5% and 36%, making it the eighth largest extinction event recorded. The reduced oxygen levels resulted from a period of global warming caused by Milankovitch cycles. In the Taghanic event, sea levels were higher. After the Taghanic event, sea life recovered in the Frasnian faunal stage starting 382.7 million years ago. The Taghanic event was followed by the Kellwasser event (372 ma) and the Hangenberg event (359 ma).

== Extinctions ==
The Taghanic event at the Givetian/Frasnian boundary caused many extinctions, including the disappearance of about 50% of coral genera. About 47% of stromatoporoid sea sponge genera disappeared. Many Bryozoa were also lost. The diversity of ammonoids, trilobites, as well as tabulate and rugose corals were reduced. Thamnopora boloniensis, a tabulate coral, became extinct.

== Sediments ==
Old Red Sandstone continent sediments have been studied to evaluate the Taghanic extinction event. The Taghanic event was discovered by studying sudden sedimentary layer changes, faunal changes, and palaeobiogeographic events. The Taghanic event is found in the Tully Formation and Marcellus Formation in New York and Pennsylvania, including the Windom shale there. The Mahantango Formation in Pennsylvania, West Virginia, and Maryland also record the Taghanic event. The Taghanic event has been found in Tafilalt, Morocco in the eastern Anti-Atlas mountain range. The Orcadian Basin in Scotland has exposed rocks from the Taghanic event.

== Taghanic onlap ==
The period of global warming that caused the Taghanic event melted ice caps, causing sea levels to rise. This caused the Taghanic onlap, the submergence of land by the advancing sea. The advancing sea laid down strata deposits on the seafloor. The flooding of what is now the southwestern United States created a shallow marine environment.

== Gallery ==

The Taghanic event was just before the Late Devonian (Late D) event. The chart gives a comparison of the extinction event to other mass extinction events in Earth's history. Plotted is the extinction intensity, calculated from marine genera.
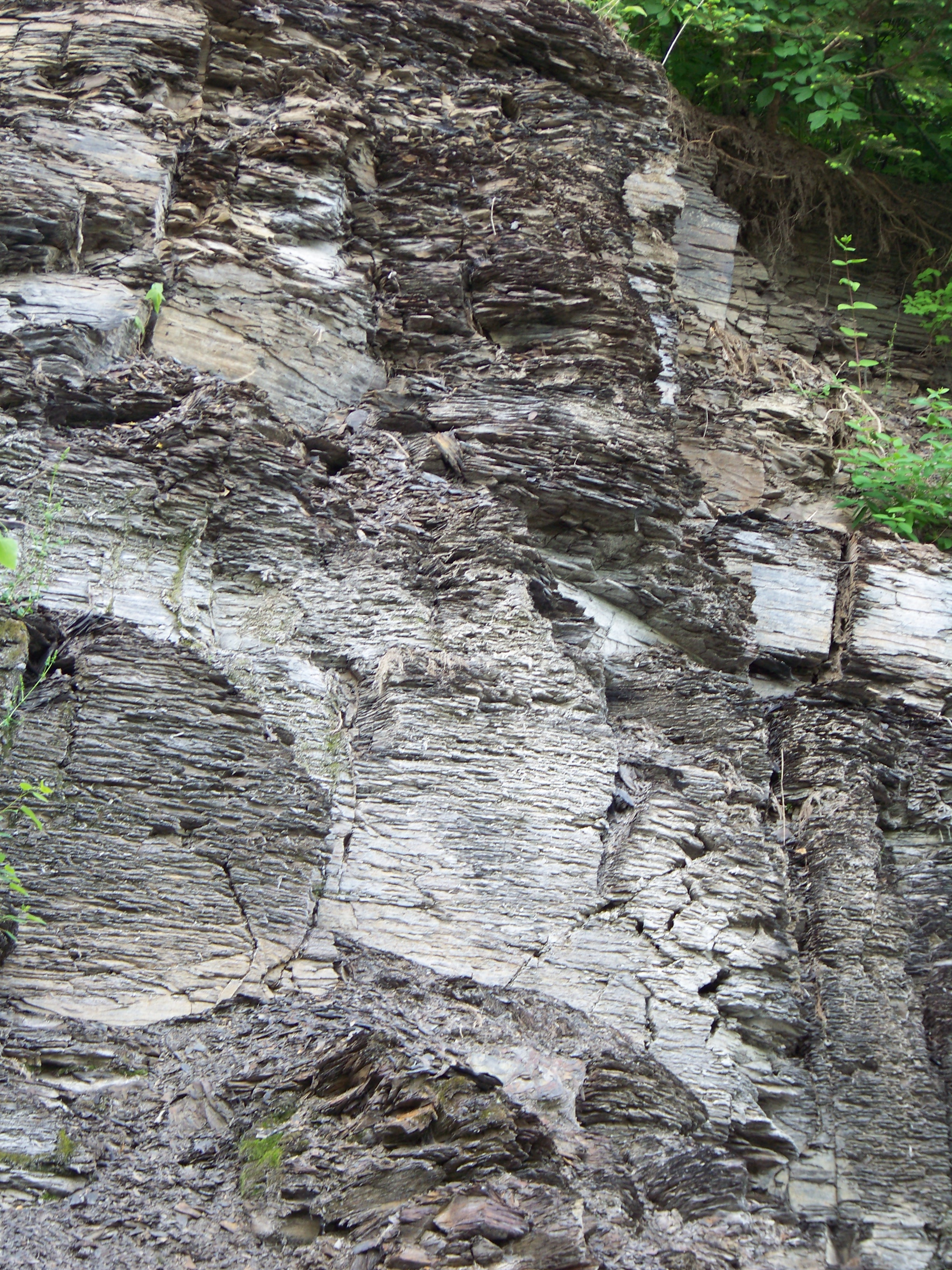
Marcellus Formation Shale from Middle Devonian sedimentary rock, location of the Taghanic event rocks

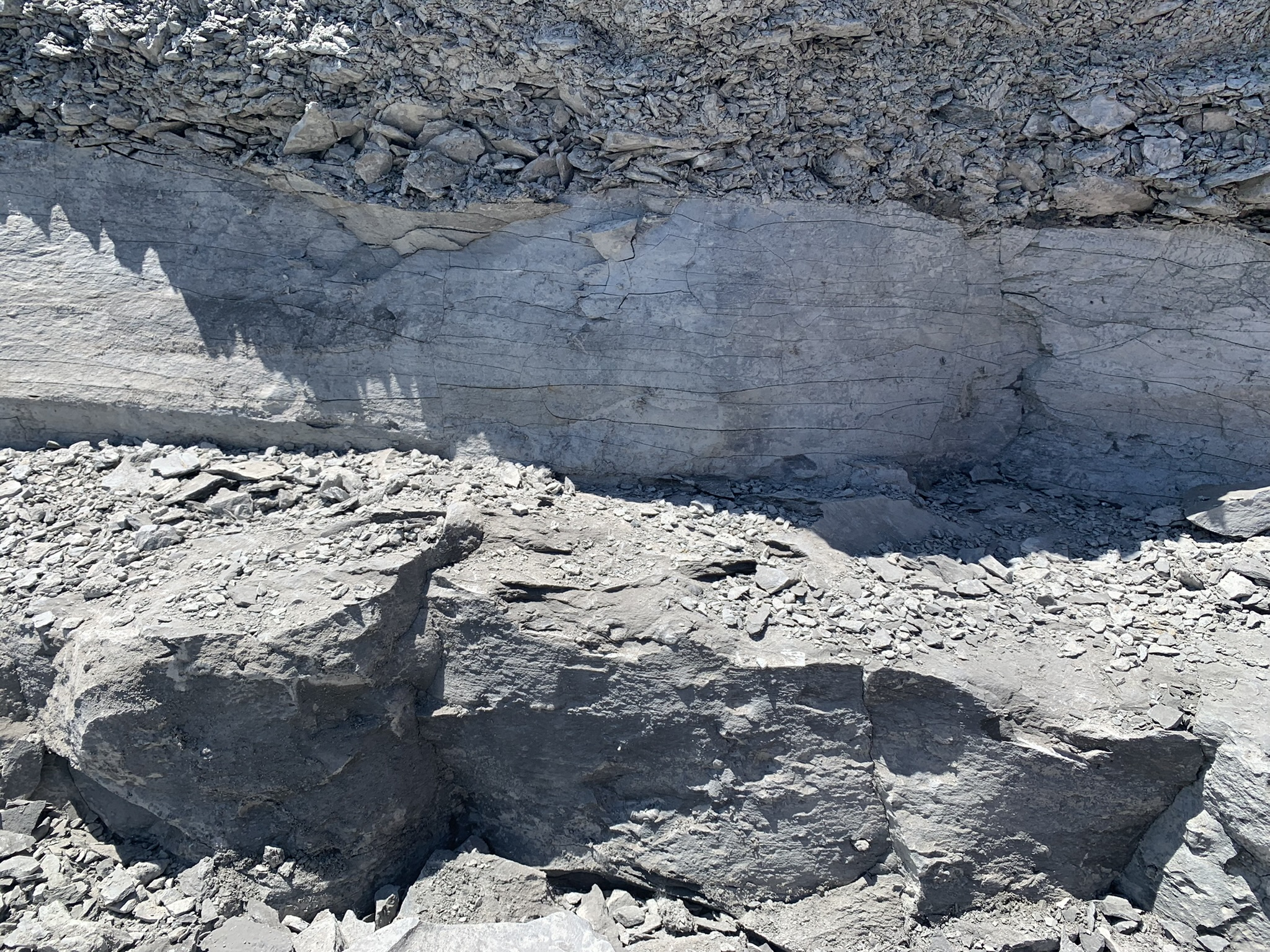
Windom shale, location of Taghanic event rocks

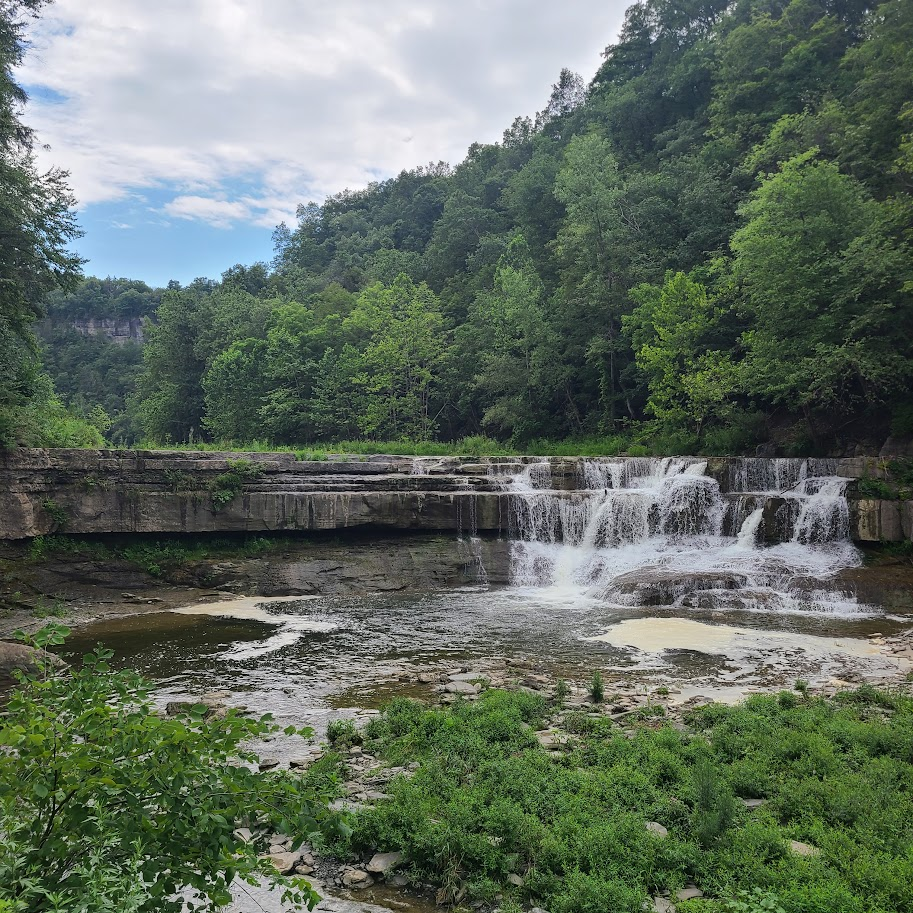
Tully Formation at Taughannock Falls State Park, location of the Taghanic event rocks

== See also ==
- Late Devonian mass extinction
- Kačák event
- Emsian
