= Suedberg, Pennsylvania =

Unincorporated community in Pennsylvania, US

Coordinates: 40°31′37″N 76°28′10″W

Suedberg is an unincorporated community in Schuylkill County, Pennsylvania, United States.

== Geography ==
Suedberg is located in Pine Grove Township, just above Swatara State Park along Pennsylvania Route 443, also known as Suedberg Road. The Suedberg Fossil Site is located here.

Mill Creek enters the Swatara Creek at Suedberg. Mill Creek, along with its branches, is impounded by the Siegrist Dam to create the Lebanon Reservoir. The Lebanon Reservoir serves as the primary water supply of Lebanon.

== History ==
Suedberg was settled as Mifflin. A post office called Mifflin was established in 1871 and closed in 1882. In 1894, it opened and renamed to Suedberg and remained in operation until 1934. Its name means "south mountain" in German.

The Suedberg Church of God was established in 1870 or 1871, under the pastorate of Elder Israel Hay, of Fredericksburg, Pennsylvania.

The old railroad bed of the Lebanon & Tremont Branch of the Reading Railroad ran through Suedberg, connecting the West End coalfields of Schuylkill County with the town of Lebanon and paralleling the Union Canal below Pine Grove. The railroad was operant until the 1960s when Interstate 81 was completed. The branch was abandoned east of Suedberg in 1965, and the remainder between 1978 and 1981. Conrail abandoned the line, with the former roadbed being transferred to the state.

== See also ==
- Swatara Furnace
