= Tower City, Pennsylvania =

Borough in Pennsylvania, US

- Borough
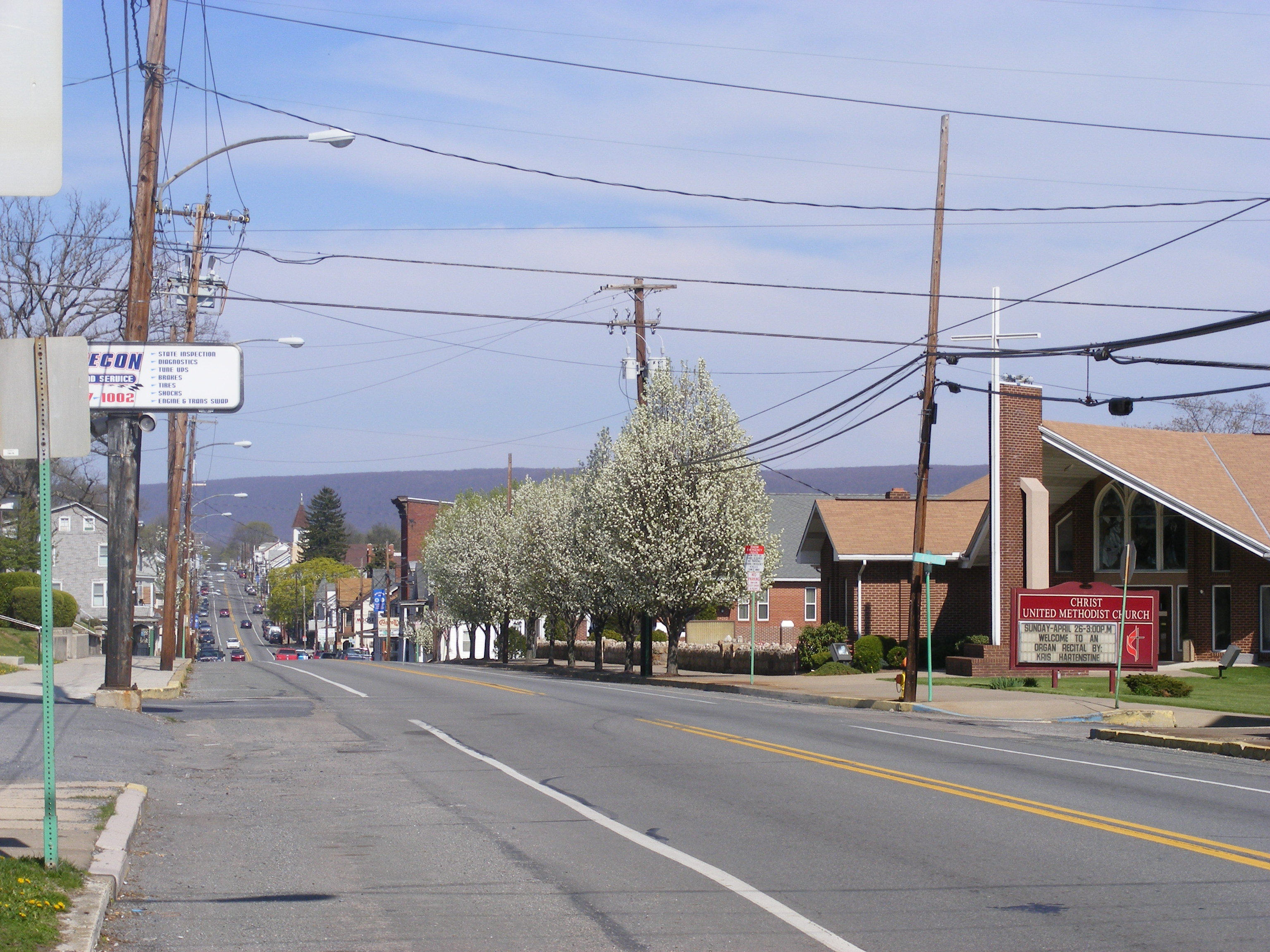
- East Grand Avenue (Rt. 209), facing northeast

- Location of Tower City in Schuylkill County, Pennsylvania.

- Location in Pennsylvania Tower City (the United States)
- Coordinates: 40°35′20″N 76°33′12″W
- Country: United States
- State: Pennsylvania
- County: Schuylkill
- Settled: 1868
- Incorporated: 1892

Government
  - Type: Borough Council
  - Mayor: John Forsythe

Area
  - Total: 0.31 sq mi (0.81 km^{2})
  - Land: 0.31 sq mi (0.81 km^{2})
  - Water: 0 sq mi (0.00 km^{2})

Population (2020)
  - Total: 1,419
  - Density: 4,511.4/sq mi (1,741.88/km^{2})
- Time zone: UTC-5 (Eastern (EST))
  - Summer (DST): UTC-4 (EDT)
- Zip code: 17980
- Area code: 717
- FIPS code: 42-77184

Tower City is a borough in Schuylkill County, Pennsylvania, United States. As of the 2020 census, Tower City had a population of 1,419.

== Geography ==
Tower City is located at 40°35′20″N 76°33′12″W (40.588869, −76.553282). According to the U.S. Census Bureau, the borough has a total area of 0.3 square mile (0.8 km^{2}), all of which is land.

== Demographics ==
Historical population
Census	Pop.	Note	%±
1890	2,053		—
1900	2,167		5.6%
1910	2,325		7.3%
1920	2,324		0.0%
1930	2,482		6.8%
1940	2,221		−10.5%
1950	2,054		−7.5%
1960	1,968		−4.2%
1970	1,774		−9.9%
1980	1,667		−6.0%
1990	1,518		−8.9%
2000	1,396		−8.0%
2010	1,346		−3.6%
2020	1,419		5.4%
2021 (est.)	1,427	▲	0.6%
U.S. Decennial Census

As of the census of 2000, there were 1,396 people, 608 households, and 383 families residing in the borough. The population density was 4,546.8 inhabitants per square mile (1,755.5/km^{2}). There were 684 housing units at an average density of 2,227.8 per square mile (860.2/km^{2}). The racial makeup of the borough was 98.85% White, 0.21% African American, 0.50% from other races, and 0.43% from two or more races. Hispanic or Latino of any race were 0.86% of the population.

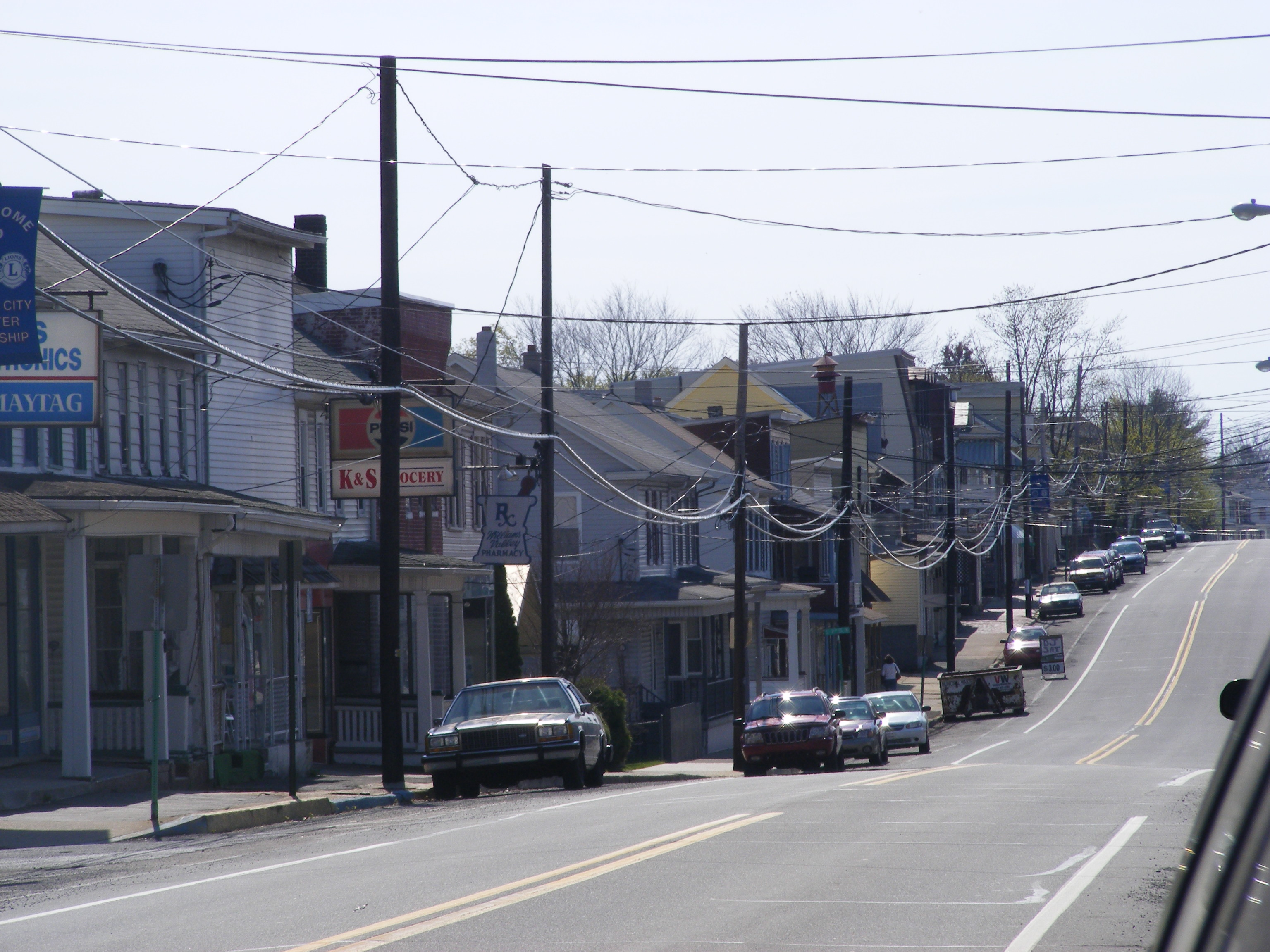
East Grand Avenue (Rt. 209) facing southwest.

There were 608 households, out of which 28.5% had children under the age of 18 living with them, 47.2% were married couples living together, 11.2% had a female householder with no husband present, and 37.0% were non-families. 32.9% of all households were made up of individuals, and 19.9% had someone living alone who was 65 years of age or older. The average household size was 2.30 and the average family size was 2.92.

In the borough the population was spread out, with 23.7% under the age of 18, 6.6% from 18 to 24, 28.8% from 25 to 44, 20.7% from 45 to 64, and 20.2% who were 65 years of age or older. The median age was 39 years. For every 100 females there were 85.6 males. For every 100 females age 18 and over, there were 84.3 males.

The median income for a household in the borough was $30,037, and the median income for a family was $39,219. Males had a median income of $29,286 versus $25,089 for females. The per capita income for the borough was $15,678. About 7.3% of families and 9.5% of the population were below the poverty line, including 8.8% of those under age 18 and 17.9% of those age 65 or over.

== Schools ==
Tower City is part of the Williams Valley School District, which services communities in both western Schuylkill County and eastern Dauphin County, Pennsylvania.

== History ==
=== Founding ===
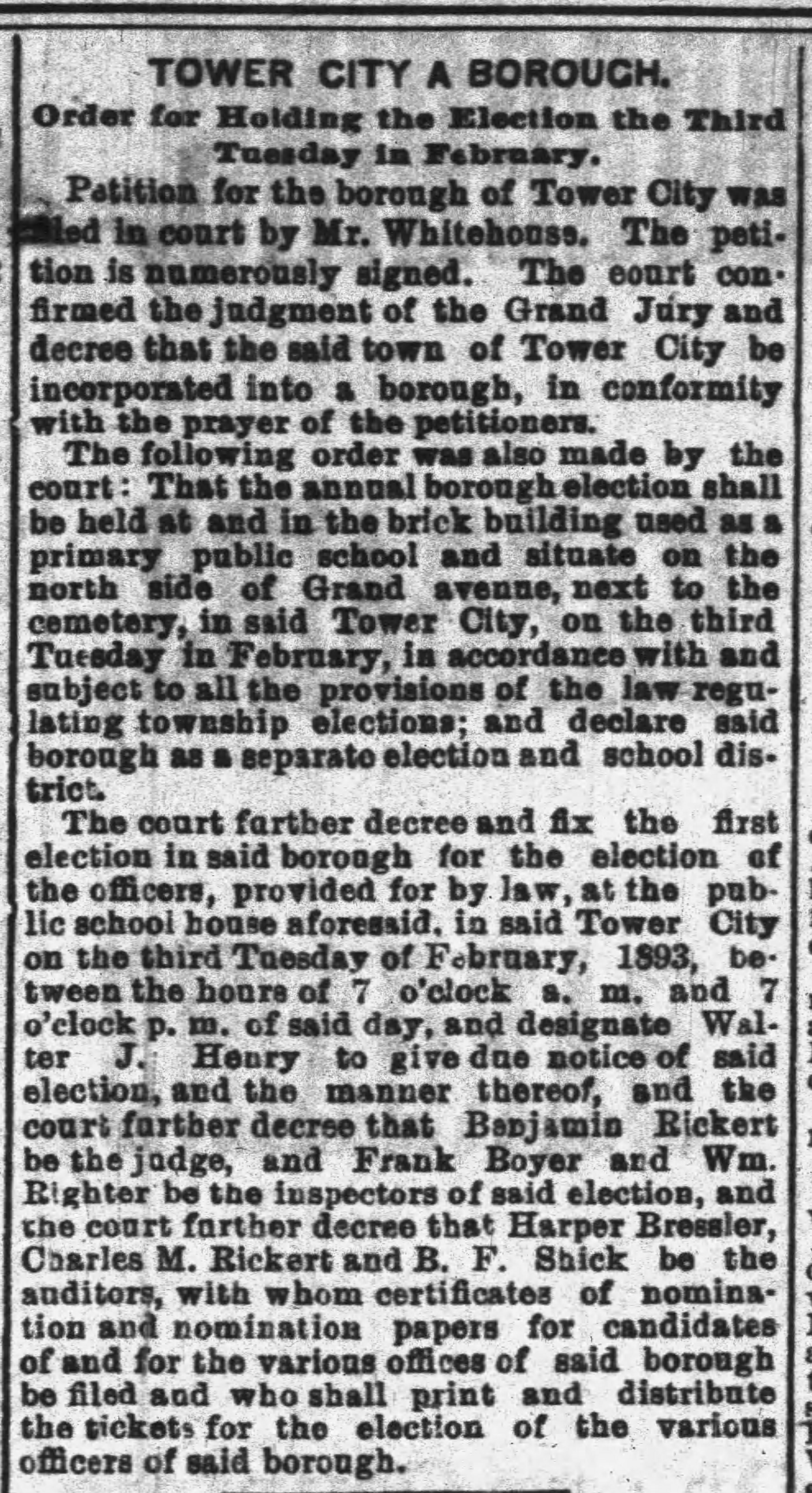
Article from the December 19, 1892 edition of the Pottsville Daily Republican announcing the incorporation of Tower City

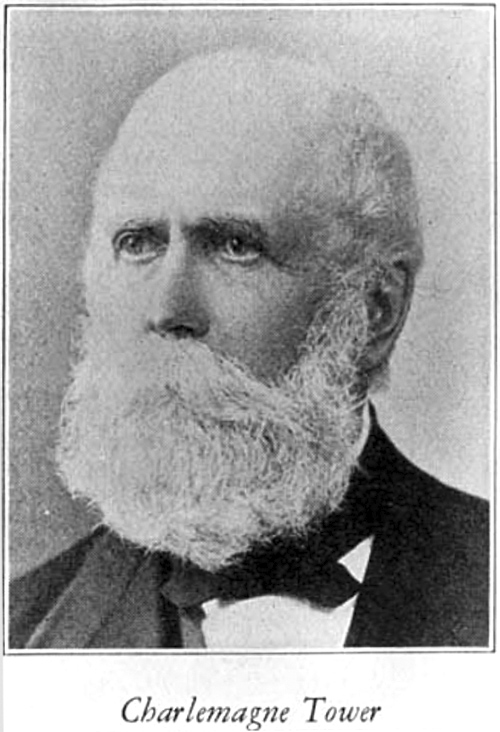
Charlemagne Tower, founder of Tower City

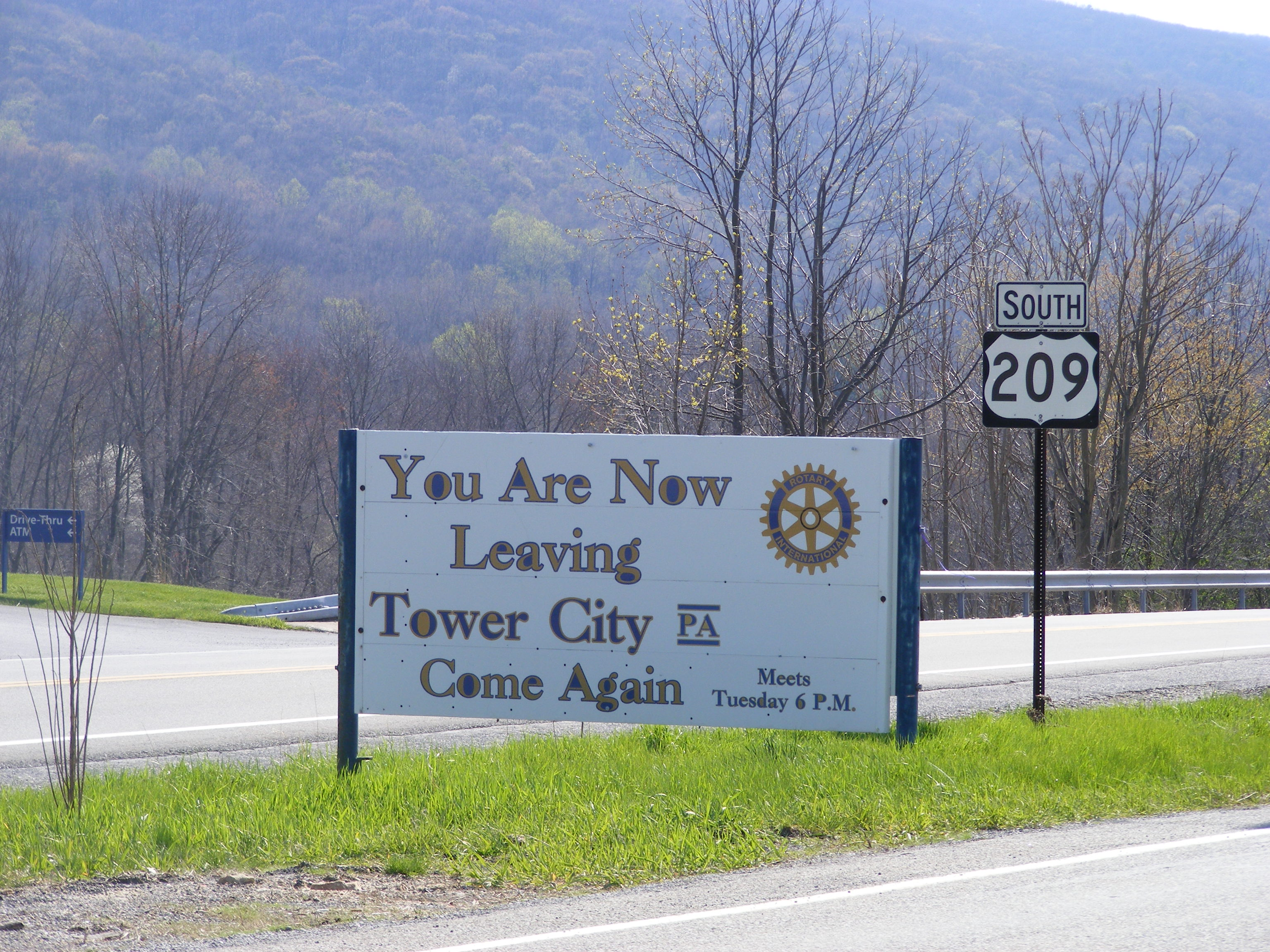
A sign constructed by the Rotary Club on US Route 209 South outside Tower City

Tower City was founded by and named for Charlemagne Tower, a New York–born lawyer who had come to Schuylkill County, Pennsylvania in 1846 to work with the legal issues regarding land claims to large coal and mineral deposits in that area. His first Pennsylvania practice was located in Orwigsburg, and then relocated to Pottsville in 1850 when it was made the Schyulkill County seat.

Not long after Tower came to Pottsville, he began furiously purchasing and clearing liens to lands containing large anthracite deposits in and around Schuylkill County. This was part of an elaborate land grab scheme devised by Tower and his partner, Alfred Munson of Utica, NY.

The plan called for Tower to use his legal acumen to clear all the liens and opposing claims to the 8,000-acre (32 km^{2}) Munson-Williams claim, and to all the land around it. In short, the partners hoped to create a single landed estate, which would have measured 65 miles by 4½ miles (105 km by 7 km) at its widest point in southwest Schuylkill County. In return, Tower was to receive ownership and title to one half of all the land acquired once all the cost to Munson had been settled, or until Tower paid him half the value of the total land purchase.

At the time, the Schuylkill Valley was a hotly contested property, with constant conflicts over titles and rights. Had any of their competitors become aware of what Tower and Munson were up to, they well may have bought up the land the pair were after, and charged exorbitant prices for it. Or worse, refuse to sell it at all. Thus, they chose to operate in secret. Tower would make the purchases, and convey the titles to legal dummies to hide the actual ownership of the land.

By 1858, Tower and Munson were owners of eleven thousand acres (45 km^{2}). By now, Munson and Tower's plan was well out of the bag, and anyone who had even a partial claim to any of the lands began to litigate. Only Tower's considerable skill as a lawyer kept the whole enterprise from falling apart.

In 1867, Tower decided to start selling the lands, wanting to realize his interest in them. Unfortunately, he could not find a buyer at the time due to the title issues. Deciding instead to establish collieries on the land, in March 1868 he leased 1,503 acres (608 ha) (6 km^{2}) to two independent coal companies. It was a 15-year term, with a rental of $.30 for each ton of coal mined. The companies placed two collieries on the land, the Tower (Later known as East Brookside) and the Brookside. Near the collieries, Tower began to develop a small town, which was named Tower City when first surveyed. Tower laid out the town, and rented lots to settlers. The town was up and running by mid-1872, and immediately suffered a housing shortage. After these initial growing pains, the town grew steadily due to the collieries, and was officially incorporated on December 19, 1892 as a borough of Porter Township, Schuylkill County.

The Brookside was established in 1868, and administered by Williams, Jones, Savage, and W.B. Kaufman. This group held the colliery until 1872, and then sold it to Repplier & Company, which held it until 1873.

During the early 1870s, Franklin Gowen, President of the Reading Railroad, had begun purchasing coal lands along the Railroad's right-of-way for the express purpose of building an anthracite coal monopoly. By 1875, Gowen had accumulated 70,000 acres (28,328 ha) (283 km^{2}), and Tower accepted his offer of purchase for his lands. Tower asked for and received $3 million from Gowen, for which Tower realized a profit of $1.5 million as per the original contract with the Munson family. Munson died in May 1854. Later that year, the Philadelphia & Reading Coal & Iron Company, a company set up by the Philadelphia & Reading Railroad to administer their anthracite properties, came into possession of the Brookside through its purchase of the Munson and Williams lands. When closed in 1938, the colliery had produced a total of 19,011,169 tons of coal over its lifetime.

The original owners of the Tower colliery were E.D. and James Savage, Evans, and Althouse. They operated the colliery from 1868 to 1873, when it was purchased by Repplier, Gordon & Company. The colliery was in service until 1874, then abandoned. The total production of the Tower colliery to 1874 was 101,550 tons of coal. The Philadelphia & Reading Coal & Iron Company reopened the colliery in 1892 and renamed it the East Brookside. It was jointly operated with the Brookside, now known as the West Brookside.

Tower City's emerging coal industry was initially serviced by the Good Spring Railroad, which built an extension from Donaldson to the Brookside in 1867. The Good Spring was initially controlled by the Reading Railroad, but transferred to the property of the Swatara Railroad in 1863. The Good Spring was then consolidated along with several other area railroads to form the Lebanon and Tremont Railroad in March 1871, and was reacquired by and merged into the Reading about a month later. In this new arrangement, the former Good Spring line was retitled as the Brookside Branch, and ran from the Brookside Colliery to Tremont, where it met the Lebanon and Tremont Branch. The Williams Valley Railroad began operations in 1892, which extended further from the Brookside branch into the Williams Valley west of Tower City. It came under Reading control itself within a few years. The Brookside branch was cut back to Keffer's Station in 1971, ending Tower City's connection with the then-Reading Company.

==== Notable mine disasters ====
===== Brookside explosion =====
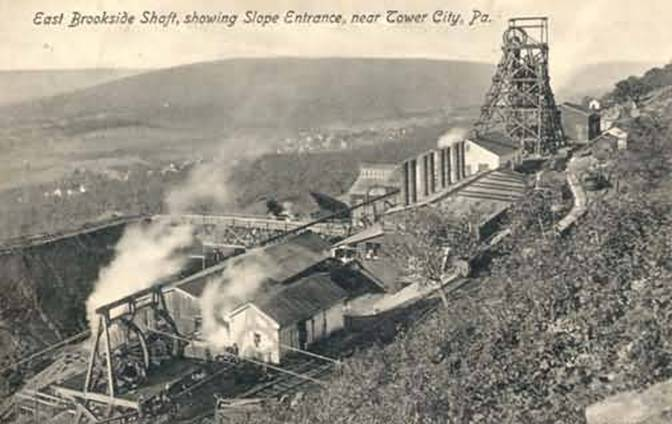
East Brookside Colliery in Tower City

On August 2, 1913, a double explosion occurred at the East Brookside Colliery, claiming the lives of eighteen men and seriously injuring two more.

After the colliery had ceased production on Thursday night, Charles Portland, a contractor for the Reading, kept some of the men at work. The work force consisted of "Muckers", who are to clean out debris from blasting (work always done in the evening), a mucker boss, a blacksmith, and his assistant. The next day, Mine Boss John Farrell and Superintendent John Lorenz entered the mine to inspect some new work. At about noon, men on the surface reported a rumbling sound, which was followed by clouds of dust from the main entrance and fan-house. A rescue party of six men was mustered and lowered into the slope. The second explosion occurred shortly thereafter, roughly 20 minutes after the first.

The work crew carried 175 pounds (79 kg) of dynamite into the mine the night before the explosion. It has been speculated that, during the course of work, one of the mucker's shovels may have struck the dynamite, detonating it. The second explosion is felt to have been caused by mine gases released by the first explosion.

===== Porter Tunnel inundation =====
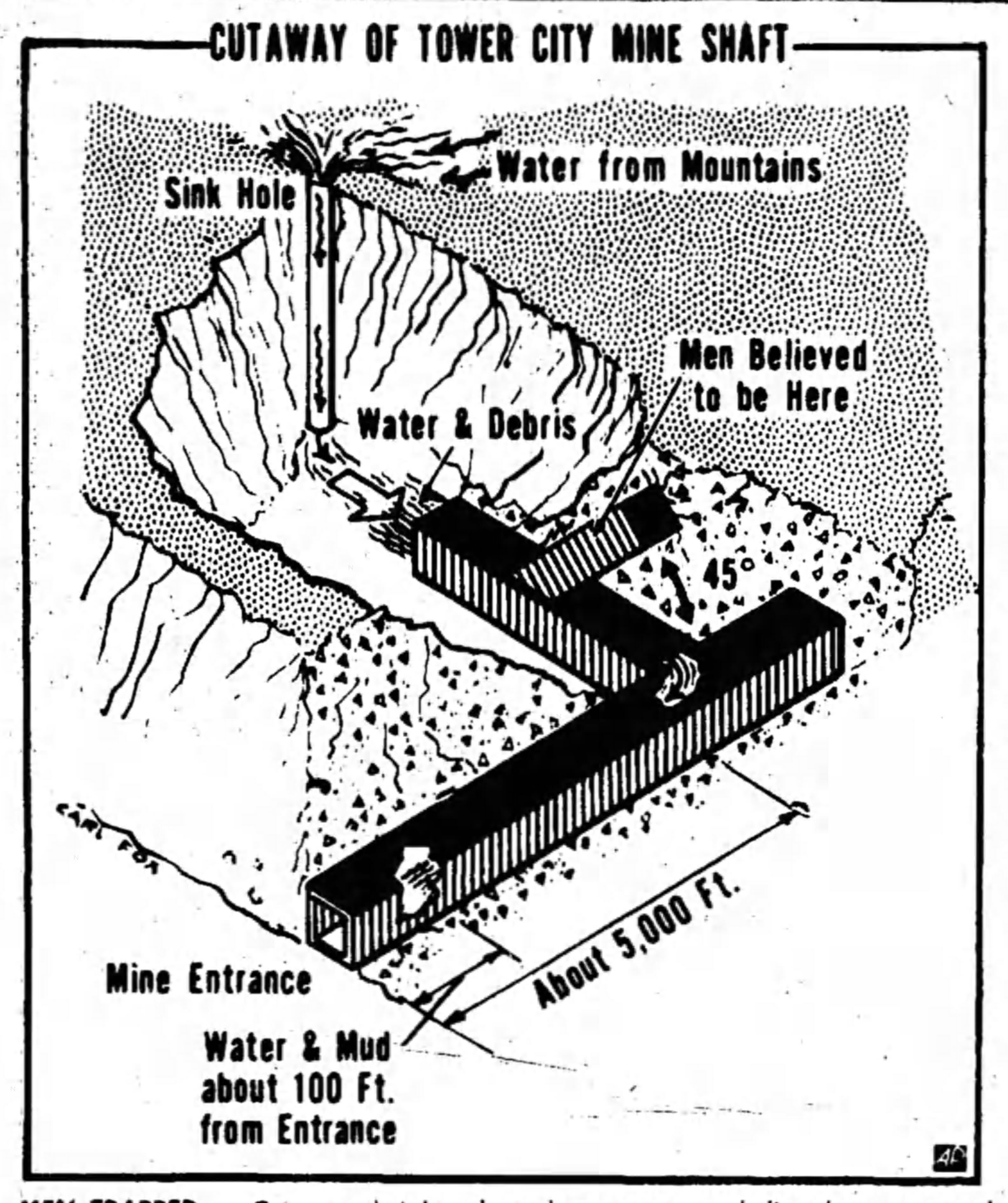
Kocher Tunnel

On Tuesday, March 1, 1977, workers in the Porter Tunnel mine, while working in a new area, broke into a flooded area of the abandoned Bush Old Bootleg Slope Mine, causing the Porter Tunnel to flood. Nine miners were killed, three were injured, and one was trapped, but eventually rescued.

Subsequent investigation determined that the map of the area used by management of the Porter Tunnel was inaccurate. It did not show the locations of all known bootleg mine works in the area, including most significantly, the Bush Old Bootleg. Management had suspected that the tunnel was nearby, and had instituted a program of drilling 26-foot-long (7.9 m) test holes in the work areas to probe for water. Workers had testified that this program was discontinued prior to the flood.

== See also ==
- Tallman East Airport
