= Moscow Formation =

Geologic formation in New York, United States

- Stratigraphic range: Givetian (Middle Devonian)
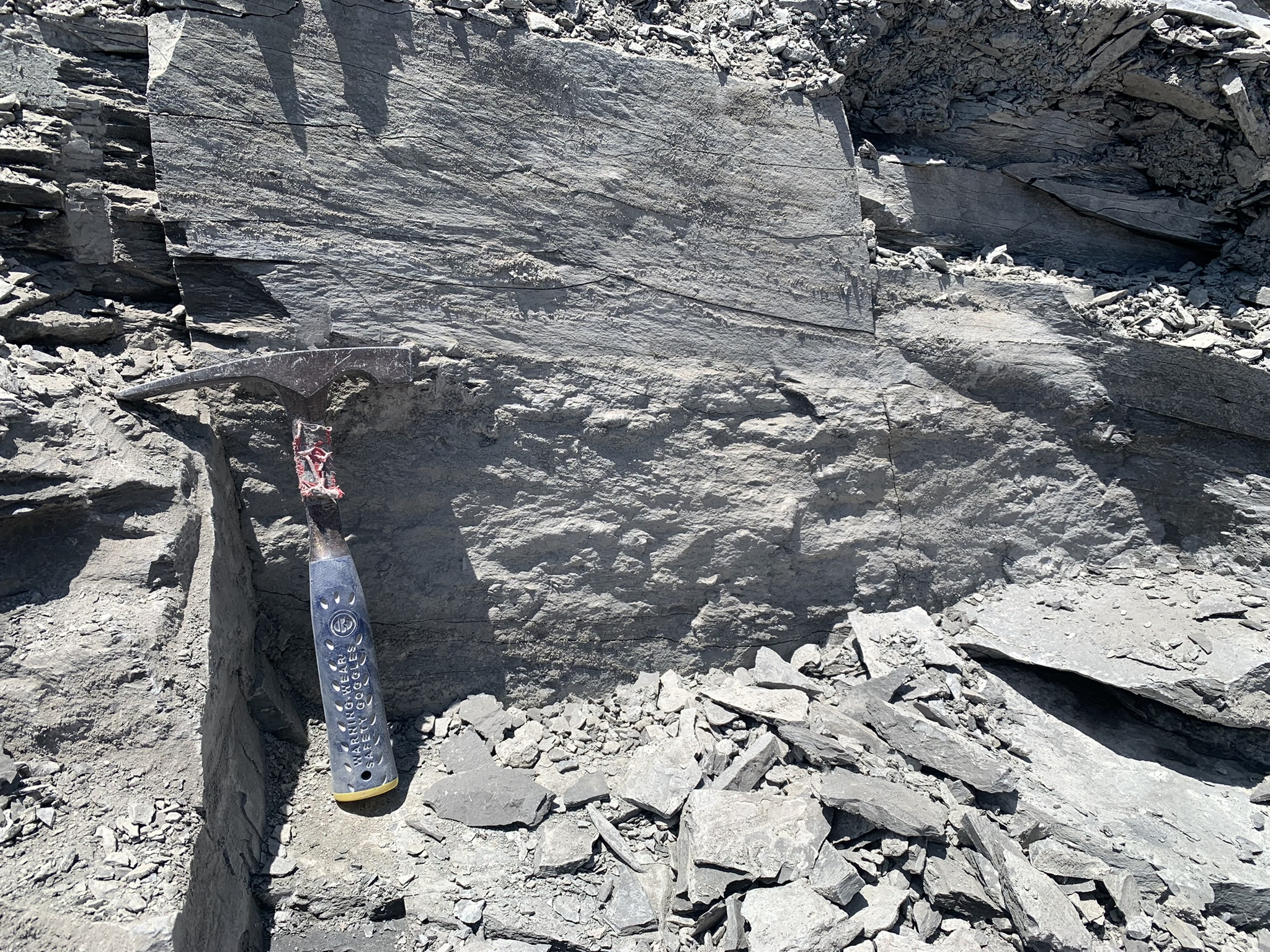
- Windom shale member of the Moscow formation
- Type: Formation
- Unit of: Hamilton group
- Sub-units: Windom shale member, Tichenor member, Deep Run member, Menteth member, Kashong member
- Overlies: Ludlowville Formation
- Thickness: 151 m

Lithology
- Primary: Sandstone, shale

Location
- Region: New York
- Country: United States

The Moscow Formation is a geologic formation in New York. It preserves fossils dating back to the Givetian stage. It represents around 1.5–2 million years of constant deposition.

== See also ==
- List of fossiliferous stratigraphic units in New York
