= Suedberg Fossil Site =

Pennsylvania Devonian fossil site

- Interactive map of Suedberg Fossil Site
- Type: Middle- Devonian (~375 Mya)
- Location: (N 40° 31.325 W 076° 28.731) Swatara State Park, Pennsylvania
- Part of: Mahantango Formation

The Suedberg Fossil Site is a Mid-Devonian (~375 mya) fossil pit that belongs to the upper Mahantango Formation. It is located in a small clearing in Swatara State Park.

The site contains various different species of marine organisms that lived in this region approximately 375 million years ago, during the Mid-Devonian period, when this site region would have been a largely a shallow, sunlit seafloor, that was home to small, marine species. Fossils found here include those of Eurypterid, various different species of Mollusks, and Trilobites.

The geology of the site consists mainly of olive-gray siltstones and claystones, like most of the upper Mahantango Formation.
