= Lorberry Creek Railroad =

Overview
- Locale: Schuylkill County, Pennsylvania, U.S.
- Successor: Lebanon and Tremont Railroad

Technical
- Track gauge: 4 ft 8 1/2 in (1,435 mm) standard gauge

The Lorberry Creek Railroad was an early railroad in Schuylkill County, Pennsylvania, United States intended to feed coal shipments to the Union Canal (Pennsylvania).

On March 30, 1831, Jacob Culp and Thomas Adams from Philadelphia, Daniel D.B. Keim and Dr. George N. Eckert from Berks County, and Henry W. Conrad and William Hoch from Pine Grove, Pennsylvania were authorized to build "a single or double railroad, from the northern end of the Union canal company's railroad, up Lorberry Creek, on lands of Ley and Hawk, to points most suitable in the heart of the coal region, in the county of Schuylkill."

The line, as constructed, ran west along the south side of Lorberry Creek from the junction, made a horseshoe curve to cross the creek and valley and turn east, and followed Lower Rausch Creek through its gap in Sharp Mountain. A switchback was located near Lower Rausch Creek Colliery. Beyond the switchback, the line climbed into Lorberry, Pennsylvania, at the headwaters of Lorberry Creek.

The railroad was originally laid with wooden strap rail and operated by horses. This was replaced by T-rail in the 1840s. The Philadelphia and Reading Railroad obtained most of the company's stock in August 1862 and took over its operation.

Under Reading control, the line became the Lorberry Branch, and an extension known as the Kalmia Branch would bring the rails west from Lorberry and down a switchback to Kalmia Colliery, on the north face of Broad Mountain. In addition, a switchback at Lorberry would lift the line to its terminus at the Lincoln Colliery (opened 1869).

On March 25, 1871, it was consolidated into the Lebanon and Tremont Railroad, which was soon after merged into the Reading. The line beyond the Lincoln Colliery was abandoned in 1940, and the rest of the branch in 1966.
