= Ludlowville Formation =

Geologic formation in the United States

- Stratigraphic range: Devonian
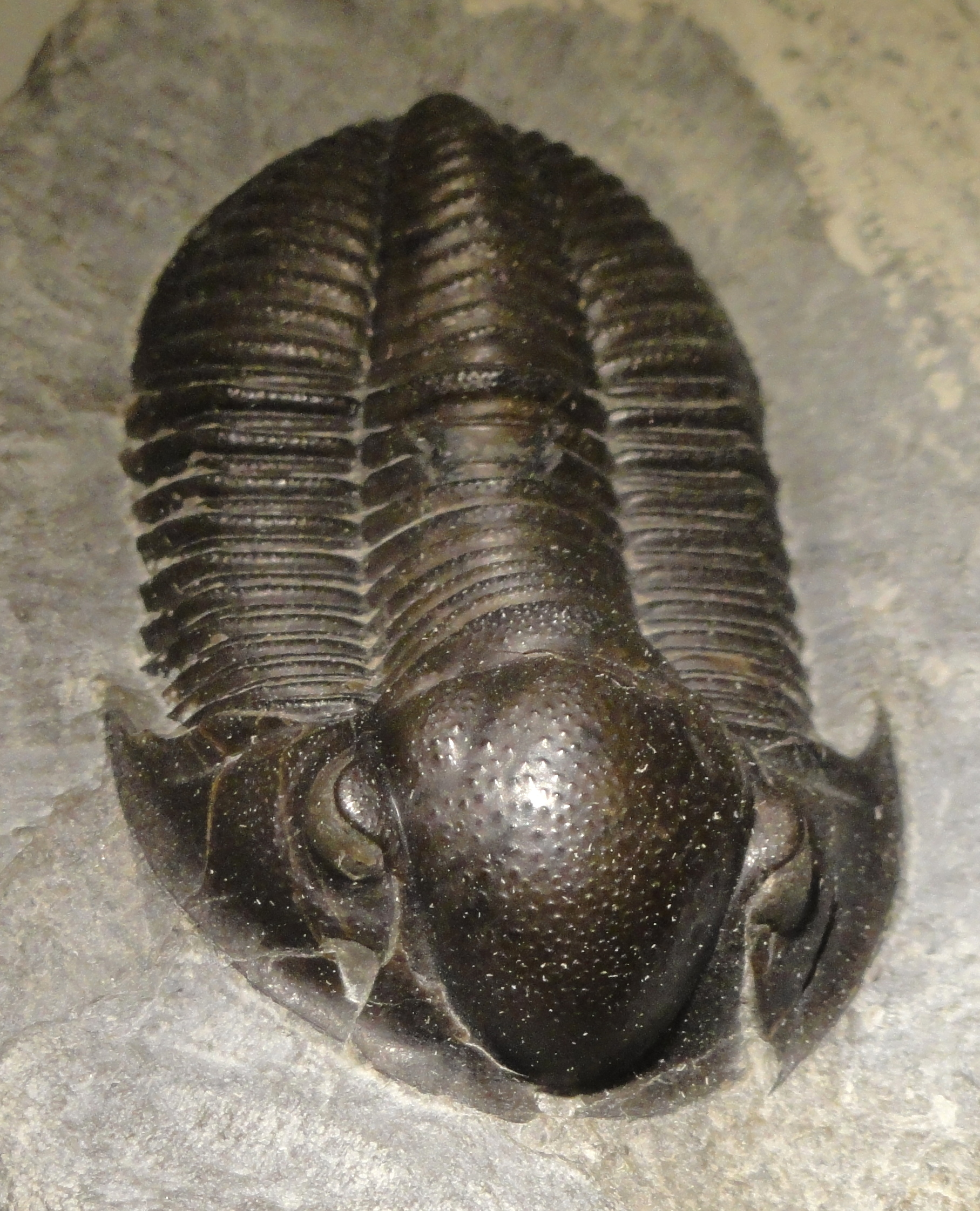
- Monodechenella macrocephala, Houston Museum of Natural Science
- Type: Formation
- Unit of: Hamilton Group
- Sub-units: Owasco Shale; Jaycox Formation; Spafford Shale; Wanakah Shale; Ledyard Shale; Otisco Shale; Centerfield Member
- Underlies: Moscow Formation
- Overlies: Skaneateles Formation

Lithology
- Primary: Shale
- Other: Limestone, Mudstone, Claystone

Location
- Region: Maryland; New York; Ohio; Pennsylvania; West Virginia
- Country: United States

Type section
- Named for: Named from exposures at Ludlowville, Tompkins Co.
- Named by: James Hall, 1839
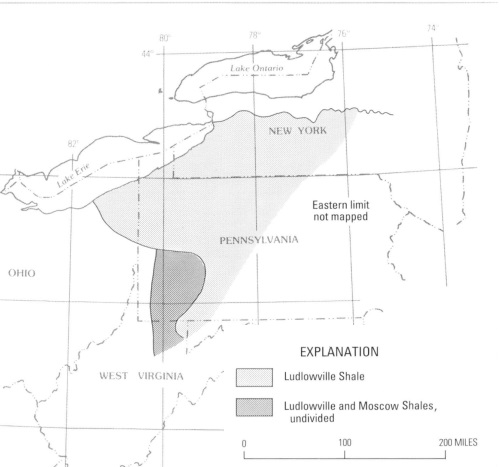
- Geographic extent of the Ludlowville Formation

The Ludlowville Formation is a geologic formation in New York, Ohio and Pennsylvania. It is the Middle Formation of the Hamilton Group. It dates to the Devonian period. The Ludlowville is bound by an upper and lower limestone. At its base and its lowest member is the Centerfield. Just above the Ludlowville and is the lowest member of the Moscow Formation is the Tichenor Limestone. This formation is noted for its abundance of shallow marine fossils.

== Subunits ==
=== Owasco ===
The Owasco is a thin distinct silty unit. It has sharp distinct boundaries at its top and base. It is flaggy, locally fossiliferous and is displays cross bedding in some locations. The upper contact maybe a diastem, rather than an erosional disconformity. This unit is fairly thin only 1-2' thick in outcrops. It thickens westward in New York state.

==== Fossils ====
The brachiopod AIlanella tullius is one of the fossils the Owasco is noted for.

=== Jaycox Member ===
The Jaycox Member is one of the upper members of the Ludlowville. This unit is primarily made of shale, with some siltstone. It's thickness ranges from about 1.5' to 52', generally thickening eastward.

The Jaycox can be subdivided into smaller sections including several fossil beds.

The uppermost section contains an unnamed barren mudstone, that is siliciclastic in nature.

Below that is the Cottage City Coral beds. These beds are the most fossil dense of the Jaycox. They contain large rugose and tabulate corals. There is an distinct upper and lower coral bed, with the middle contains a calcareous mudstone with numerous fossils of brachiopods, bryozoans, and pelmatozoa. This bed is generally 3 to 6 feet thick.

This is followed by another barren interval of mudstone.

Below that is the Demosponge-Megastrophia bed. This bed contains high concentrations of demosponges and brachiopod megastrophia concava, one of the larges brachiopds known. This interval is made of a calcareous mudstone.

The Green's Landing Coral Bed, is a siliciclastic to calcareous bed with a large amount of fossil material. These include demosponges, brachiopods, bryozoans, and crinoids. Named by Meyer, 1989 for an exposure above Green's Landing at Canandaigua Lake.

The Tropidoleptus-Longispina Interval. Contains abundant brachiopod fossils of Tropidoleptus carinatus (Conrad, 1839) and Longispina mucronata (Hall 1843)

There is an unnamed mudstone above the Hills Gulch bed.

The basial Jaycox contains the Hills Gulch bed, a fossiliferous bed with corals and shells, as well as megaburrows at its basial contact. The Hills Gulch is a calcareous siltstone.

=== Spafford Member ===
The Spafford Member is about 25 feet thick and is composed of shale, silty mudstone and siltstone. Near its base is the Bloomer Creek Shell Bed. This is rich in bivalves while the upper section is relativity barren. The Spafford is the eastern rough equitant of the Jaycox Member

=== Wanakah Shale ===
At Lake Erie the Wanakah is a medium gray shale. Moving eastward he unit grades eastward into dark gray to black shales in the western Finger Lakes region. Further east, equivalent rocks belong to the silty Ivy Point (Kloc, 1983). The Wanakah member maybe further divided into 4 submembers.

The basial unit is the Darien Center Submember. This unit maybe traced from New York's western edge to the Finger Lakes region. This highly fossiliferous unit was defined by Miller (1991), and is approximately 16 feet thick.

Above is the Idlewood Cliffs Submember. This is composed of about 28 feet of dark gray to grayish black shale. Unlike many other units this one is nearly devoid of fossils. There are thin limestone bands with in this unit. This submember was name for the Idlewood Cliffs near the town of Hamburg, New York, (Batt 1996).

The Highland-On-The-Lake Submember overlies the Idlewood Cliffs. This unit is a dark gray shale that is about 16 feet thick.

Resting atop the other submembers is the Buffalo Creek Member, named for Buffalo Creek near the town of Elma, New York. The submember is over 10 feet thick. (Batt 1996)

Grabau (1917) named the Wanakah Shale for roughly 65 foot exposure at Wanakah Cliff on Lake Erie near the hamlet of Wanakah, New York.

=== Centerfield Member ===
The Centerfield Member is a geologic formation in New York, and Pennsylvania. It dates back to the Givetian stage in the Devonian period. It is the lowest member of the Ludlowville Formation and it overlies the Skaneateles Formation. The Centerfield, tends to be medium gray to dark gray. When exposed to weathering it will fade to a medium brown color. A phosphate bed with nodules up to half an inch occupies a thin layer at the top of the Centerfield. These beds are associated with staghorn coral. The Peppermill Gulf bed is at the base of the Centerfield Member. The Peppermill Gulf bed is bioturbated, silty mudstone that contains brachiopods, bivalves, rugose corals. The Centerfield Limestone was named by Smith (1930)

==== Fossils ====
This Centerfield Member contains fossils of crinoids, rugosa, bivalvia, trilobites and brachiopods. This unit also contains several corals including; Eridophyllum and Heliophyllum hali.
