= Tallman East Airport =

- IATA: none; ICAO: none; FAA LID: 58PA

Summary
- Airport type: Private
- Owner: Tallman Brothers
- Operator: John Tallman
- Serves: Tower City, Pennsylvania
- Elevation AMSL: 842 ft (257 m)
- Coordinates: 40°35′30″N 076°30′51″W
- Interactive map of Tallman East Airport

Runways
Direction	Length		Surface
Direction	ft	m	Surface
8/26	2,200	671	Turf

Tallman East Airport (FAA LID: 58PA) is a private airport in Tower City, Pennsylvania. It is used for private aviation. The airport is owned by the Tallman Brothers.
