= Swatara Furnace =

Historic furnace in Pennsylvania, US

- U.S. National Register of Historic Places
- U.S. Historic district
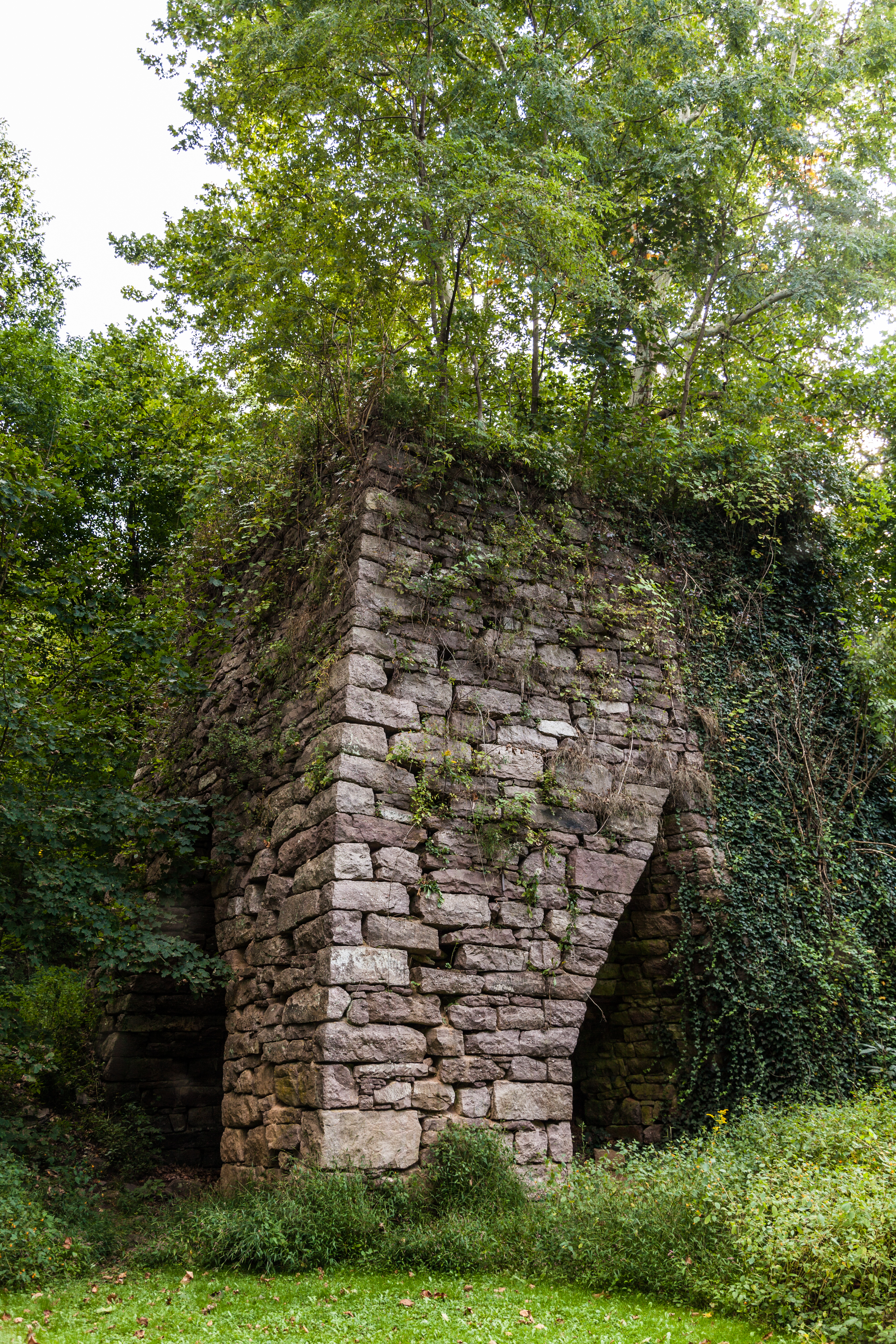

- Location within Pennsylvania Location within the United States
- Nearest city: Old Forge Road east of Lebanon Reservoir, north of Suedberg, Pine Grove Township, Pennsylvania
- Coordinates: 40°32′35″N 76°29′27″W
- Area: 20 acres (8.1 ha)
- Built: 1830
- Architectural style: Iron furnace
- MPS: Iron and Steel Resources of Pennsylvania MPS
- NRHP reference No.: 91001140
- Added to NRHP: September 6, 1991

The Swatara Furnace is a historic iron furnace and 200-acre national historic district located along Mill Creek, a tributary of the Swatara Creek in Pine Grove Township, Schuylkill County, Pennsylvania.

The first charcoal furnace to be erected in Schuylkill County, Pennsylvania, the Swatara Furnace and its related buildings were added to the National Register of Historic Places in 1991.

== History ==
The Swatara Furnace and ironmaster's mansion, the first two of the structures to be erected along Mill Creek and which now make up part of the Swatara Furnace Historic District, were built circa 1830, creating an "iron plantation," which was typical of the furnace-ironmaster home complexes erected across eastern and central Pennsylvania during the early to mid-nineteenth century. The furnace, which was established sometime around 1830 by Dr. George N. Eckert, a Whig member of the U.S. House of Representatives, and Simeon Guilford, was "a significant regional furnace from 1830 until its demise c. 1860," according to a 1991 report by Diane B. Reed, a historic preservation specialist with the Pennsylvania Historical and Museum Commission (PHMC). A short time later, it was "converted to a forge and foundry where once famous Swatara stoves were cast and finished." According to J. H. Beers' Biographical Annals of Lebanon County, "Simeon Guilford … was for many years prominently identified with the iron business of Pennsylvania, and won public approval as a skilled and reliable civil engineer." Employed in that capacity prior to 1823 during the construction of the Erie Canal, he subsequently secured work as the principal assistant to the Union Canal's chief engineer, Canvas White. Shortly thereafter, Guilford was employed by the Commonwealth of Pennsylvania, charged with surveying the route of the canal which ran from Clark's Ferry on the Susquehanna River to Northumberland. It was also during this period (between 1825 and 1832) that Guilford "discovered the celebrated Chestnut Hill iron ore, on the Greider farm, near Columbia, Pa., which he owned for some years," according to Beers' Annals, as well as "three other fine deposits of hematite ore, in Lebanon County." Partnering with Eckert from 1830 to 1831, Guilford then "erected in the Swatara Valley, in Schuylkill County, the 'Swatara Furnace' for the manufacture of iron by charcoal, and here pig iron and such castings as stoves, water pipes, etc., were produced in large quantities, this establishment remaining in operation for twenty years."

Per Richard C. Taylor, president of the board of directors of the Dauphin and Susquehanna Coal Company in his 1840 reports "on the Coal Lands, Mines and Improvements" of that company, "the Swatara furnace, of Messrs. Guilford & Eckert" was "used with the hot blast" and produced "about twelve hundred tons of iron annually." The ore was "partly brown haematite from Chestnut Hill near Columbia, brought seventy miles, and partly from near Lebanon, about thirty-two miles."

Production at the furnace ceased in 1853, ending both the partnership between Guilford and Eckert and roughly two decades of furnace operation.

=== Listing on the National Register of Historic Places ===
PHMC historic preservation specialist Diane Reed was the individual who prepared the National Register of Historic Places Registration Form for this district; she submitted it to the National Park Service of the United States Department of the Interior on March 21, 1991. The Swatara Furnace Historic District was then officially added to the National Register of Historic Places in July 1992. At the time the register listing was announced, newspapers also reported that members of the Pine Grove Historical Society and Pennsylvania Game Commission were working together "to reopen the park and maintain the furnace" as part of regional preservation efforts to preserve the historic structures located along Mill Creek.

== Notable structures ==
The four contributing buildings of the Swatara Furnace Historic District are located along both sides of Mill Creek, and include: the furnace (1830), stone dam breast (c. 1850), ironmaster's mansion (c. 1830, c. 1860, c. 1881, and c. 1969), barn (c. 1860), stone foreman's house (c. 1830), and stone worker's double house (c. 1830). The furnace, which was built in 1830 roughly 150 feet south of Mill Creek, was constructed of limestone, and measures 29 feet, 7 inches, wide, 29 feet, 8 inches, deep, and 22 feet high.

The original section of the ironmaster's mansion, which was built circa 1830 (around the same time as the furnace), was a 2-1/2 story stone structure which was "two bays wide … with six over six windows." The home's 3-1/2 story eastern section, which was subsequently added circa 1860, was "three bays wide, and four bays deep, forming an ell … with six over six windows and with shutters." A frame construction which added 2-1/2 stories to the home's north side was likely built at roughly the same time (c. 1860), according to PHMC historic preservation specialist Diane Reed.

The stone dam breast, which was described on the district planning committee's application for National Register placement as "one of the most unusual features of the historic district," is a "stone battered-wall dam breast" which was built "to replace an earlier earthen dam which was apparently washed out during one of the periodic floods on the creek." Mostly destroyed by a flood which occurred sometime around 1860, "a substantial portion of the dam breast still remains on the northwest bank of the creek."

The two non-contributing buildings in this district are a single pen, one-story log cabin, which was built circa 1933, and the water control house, a brick structure which was erected in 1960 and was still in use by the City of Lebanon's water department at the time of the district's 1991 placement on the National Register.

=== Later changes to the property and existing structures ===
The ironmaster's mansion was altered further, following the property's 1881 purchase by Mahlon Boyer, who wrapped a porch-veranda around the home's eastern, southern and western sides. The rear of the original 1830 building was then expanded in 1969 with the addition of a one-story laundry room with flat roof. By 1991 when planners were applying for historic district status with the National Register, the home was being operated as a bed and breakfast. The ironmaster’s mansion was later owned by the Lebanon City Authority until it was sold at auction to Tyler Bouldin in October 2020. Following the sale, the restoration of the mansion was featured in a series of videos on social media under the name The Forge House. As of 2023, the mansion is a private residence.

In 2016, the Lebanon City Authority, Swatara State Parks, Pine Grove Historical Society, Friends of Memorial Lake, Oak Grove Sportsmen's Association, Old Forge Fishing Club, and Pennsylvania Game Commission joined together to launch a preservation initiative to protect and restore the historic Swatara Forge.
