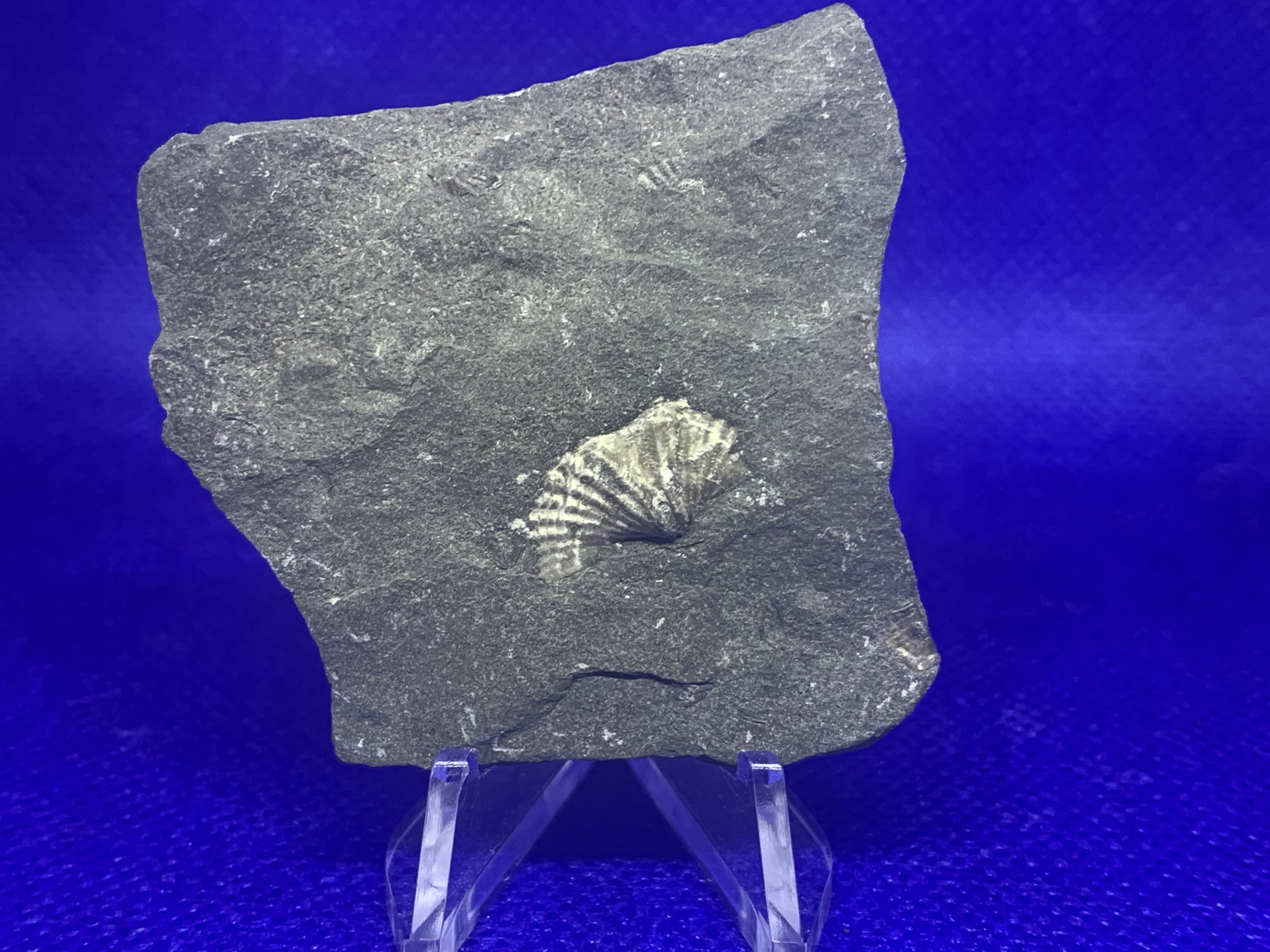
- A Mucrospirifer mucronatus from the Windom shale.

Scientific classification
- Kingdom: Animalia
- Phylum: Brachiopoda
- Class: Rhynchonellata
- Order: †Spiriferida
- Family: †Mucrospiriferidae
- Genus: †Mucrospirifer
- Species: †M. mucronatus

Binomial name
- †Mucrospirifer mucronatus Conrad, 1841

= Mucrospirifer mucronatus =

Mucrospirifer mucronatus Temporal range: Middle Devonian

Species of Brachiopod

Mucrospirifer mucronatus is a species of articulate brachiopod from the middle Devonian. The species serves as an index fossil for the middle Devonian.

== Discovery and history ==
Mucrospirifer mucronatus was discovered by Timothy Abbott Conrad in 1841 as Delthyris mucronatus. Until 1931, most species in the genus Mucrospirifer would be classified under the genus Spirifer. Amadeus William Grabau would first propose the genus Mucrospirifer in 1931, using Mucrospirifer mucronatus as the type species.

== Description ==
Mucrospirifer mucronatus typically has a biconvex shell. The shell is covered in ribs (known as costae). The cardinal extremities on the posterior are elongated in adolescent specimens to form spines.

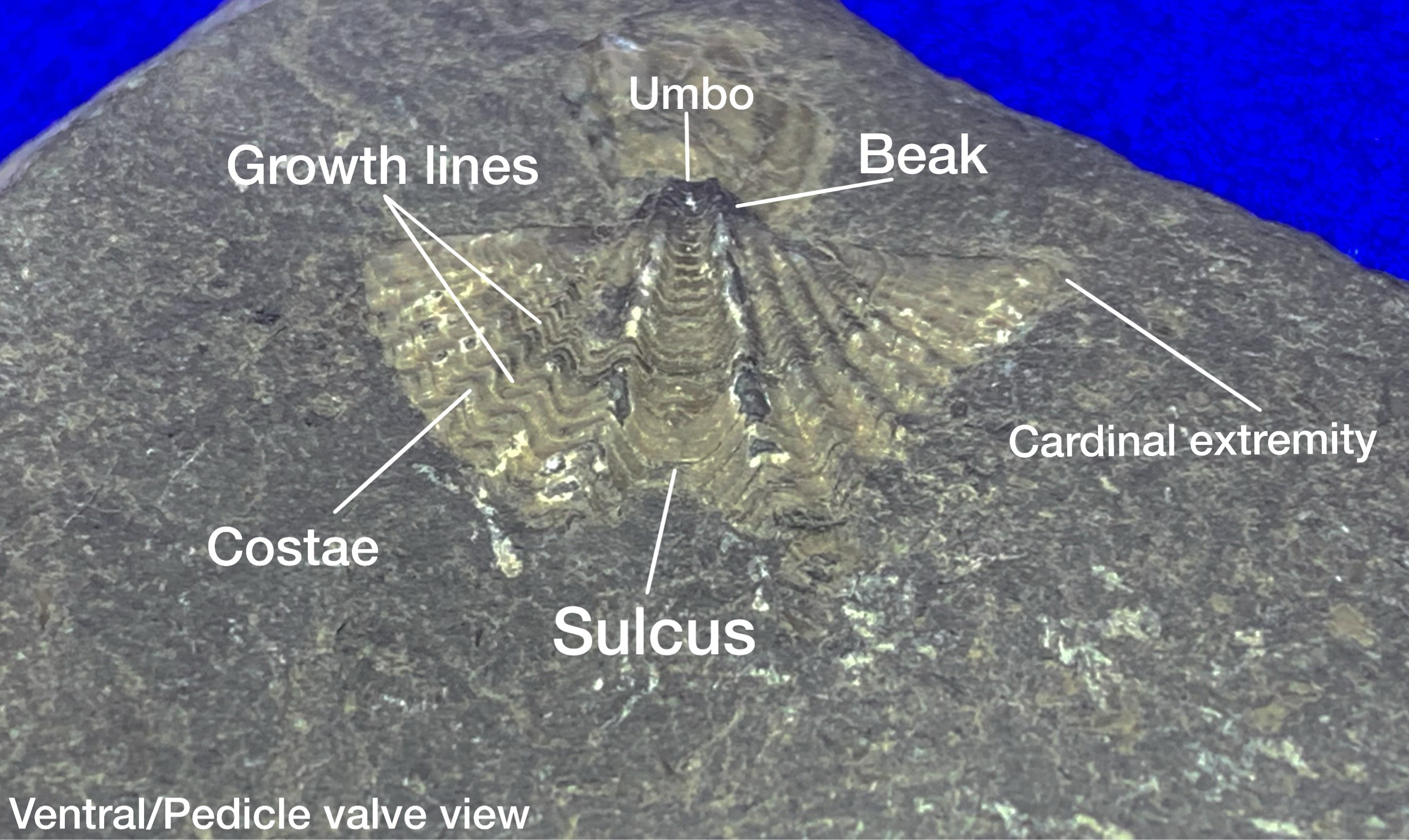
Morphology of Mucrospirifer

== Life habits and paleoecology ==
Mucrospirifer mucronatus was a filter feeder, that lived anchored to the seafloor. The species would’ve been common to reefs in the middle Devonian, was attached to the seafloor through a pedicle. Mucrospirifer mucronatus would often be a host for epibionts. Like modern brachiopods, Mucrospirifer mucronatus would have tolerated relatively anoxic conditions.
