= Lebanon and Tremont Branch =

Map of the Lebanon and Tremont Branch

The Lebanon and Tremont Branch of the Philadelphia & Reading Railroad was a railroad line in Lebanon and Schuylkill County, Pennsylvania, built to tap the coal fields in the West End of Schuylkill County and send coal southward to Lebanon.

== Origins ==
Good Spring Railroad
Overview
- Locale: Schuylkill County, Pennsylvania
- Dates of operation: 1863?–1871
- Successor: Lebanon & Tremont Railroad

Technical
- Track gauge: 4 ft 8 1/2 in (1,435 mm) standard gauge

The northern portion of the Lebanon & Tremont came from the Good Spring Railroad, which was incorporated in 1861 or 1863, but was not organized until March 26, 1869. It was controlled by the Reading Company (RDG) which transferred to it the property of the Swatara Railroad in 1863, giving it a line from Lorberry Junction to Donaldson via Tremont. In 1868, it was extended from Donaldson to Brookside.

At Lorberry Junction, the Good Spring connected with the former Union Canal and the Lorberry Creek railroads, the former of which ran south to the Union Canal and the Schuylkill & Susquehanna Railroad at Pine Grove. All were by now owned by RDG. While coal originating on these railroads could be hauled laterally east and west over the Schuylkill and Susquehanna from Pine Grove, or west on the Mine Hill and Schuylkill Haven Railroad from Tremont, there was no direct route southward. To remedy this, the RDG chartered two new roads.

Pine Grove and Lebanon Railroad
Overview
- Locale: Schuylkill County, Pennsylvania
- Dates of operation: 1870–1871
- Successor: Lebanon & Tremont Railroad

Technical
- Track gauge: 4 ft 8 1/2 in (1,435 mm) standard gauge

Lebanon and Pine Grove Railroad
Overview
- Locale: Lebanon County, Pennsylvania
- Dates of operation: 1870–1871
- Successor: Lebanon & Tremont Railroad

Technical
- Track gauge: 4 ft 8 1/2 in (1,435 mm) standard gauge

The Pine Grove and Lebanon Railroad was incorporated on September 27, 1868 (the first railroad incorporated under Pennsylvania's general railroad law) to build south from Pine Grove to the Lebanon County line. The Lebanon & Pine Grove Railroad (L&PG) was incorporated at about the same time to be built from the county line south to Lebanon, meeting the Reading's Lebanon Valley Branch. The new line was built in 1870, and the first train ran between Lebanon and Pine Grove on March 7, 1870. The Pine Grove & Lebanon, L&PG, Good Spring and Lorberry Creek were consolidated to form the Lebanon & Tremont Railroad (L&T) on March 25, 1871. On May 8, 1871, L&T was itself merged into the Philadelphia & Reading Railroad.

Lebanon and Tremont Railroad
Overview
- Locale: Pennsylvania
- Dates of operation: 1871–1871
- Successor: Philadelphia & Reading Railroad

Technical
- Track gauge: 4 ft 8 1/2 in (1,435 mm) standard gauge

== Main and branch lines ==
The L&T proper consisted of former L&T lines from Lebanon to Pine Grove and Lorberry Junction to Tremont, and the former Union Canal line from Pine Grove to Lorberry Junction. The Good Spring became the Brookside Branch, and the Lorberry Creek became the Lorberry Branch. In 1872 the tail of the second Lorberry Branch switchback was extended, and ran by a switchback down the north side of Stony Mountain to reach the Kalmia Colliery. It was then extended by another switchback into Clarks Valley, and ran along Clarks Creek. In 1892, the Williams Valley Railroad built a line into the Williams Valley from Brookside, which later came under RDG control.

Several other RDG lines connected with the L&T:

- Lebanon Valley at Lebanon
- Schuylkill & Susquehanna at Pine Grove
- Tremont Extension and Mount Eagle at Tremont.

== Stations ==
Lebanon & Tremont Branch

Name	Length		Notes
Name	mi	km	Notes
Lebanon	0.0	0.0	Connection with Lebanon Valley branch
Westmont	?		
Heilmandale	3.8	6.1	
Bunker Hill	?		
Jonestown	7.2	11.6	
Indiantown Gap	10.5	16.9	
Inwood	?		
Green Point	13.6	21.9	
Murray	?		
Irving	?		Only intact station; preserved in North Pine Grove
Exmoor	?		
Suedberg	18.8	30.3	
Pine Grove	23.8	38.3	
North Pine Grove	25.7	41.4	
Lorberry Junction	26.6	42.8	Connection with Lorberry branch
Tremont	30.7	49.4	

Brookside Branch

Name	Length		Notes
Name	mi	km	Notes
Tremont	0.0	0.0	Connection with L&T, Tremont Extension and Mount Eagle lines
Donaldson	1.0	1.6	
West End Colliery	2.5	4.0	
Good Spring	5.4	8.7	
Osterman	6.5	10.5	
Keffers	7.2	11.6	
Tower City Station	?		used before the Williams Valley Railroad reached Tower City
East Brookside	10.5	16.9	
Brookside	?		Connection with Williams Valley

Lorberry, Kalmia and Clarks Valley Branches

Name	Length		Notes	
Name	mi	km	Notes	
Lorberry Junction	0.0	0.0	align="right"	Connection with L&T, Tremont Extension and Mount Eagle lines
Lower Rausch Creek Colliery	?			
Lorberry Colliery	?			
junction Kalmia Branch	?			
Lincoln Colliery	?			
Kalmia Branch
Kalmia Colliery	?		Connection with Clarks Valley line	

== Operation ==
Passenger service was provided on most lines to bring workers to the collieries. After RDG purchased the West End collieries in the 1870s, it began offering service to its workers in the form of two miners' trains running north from Pine Grove. After the Coal Strike of 1902, the RDG hired extensively in the Pennsylvania Dutch country to the south of the coal fields. The miners's trains ceased in 1908.

In 1942, a turning loop was built at the Indiantown Gap station to create a railhead for Fort Indiantown Gap. The former site of the loop is now an isolated piece of Swatara State Park.

Passenger service was eliminated in 1957.

== Decline ==
The Clarks Valley and Kalmia lines between Ecco and Kalmia collieries were removed before 1920. In 1940, the remainder of the Kalmia Branch was removed; around this time, the second switchback on the Lorberry Branch was abandoned, as the Lincoln Colliery had ceased operation in 1930. A new spur and loop was constructed at Lorberry to serve strip mines. In 1965, the L&T between Pine Grove and Suedberg was abandoned. The Lorberry Branch followed in its entirety in 1966. In 1971, the Good Spring line was cut back from Brookside to Keffers; by 1973 to Good Spring.

The remaining trackage was transferred to Conrail in 1976. The Lorberry Junction-Pine Grove segment was abandoned before 1978; remaining parts of the L&T were abandoned before 1981. The Tremont-Good Spring segment was sold by Conrail in 1990 to current owner Reading Blue Mountain & Northern Railroad. The 7.5 miles (12.1 km) Inwood-Irving segment within Swatara State Park are now the Swatara rail trail.
