= Thamnopora boloniensis =

Scientific classification
- Domain: Eukaryota
- Kingdom: Animalia
- Phylum: Cnidaria
- Subphylum: Anthozoa
- Class: †Tabulata
- Family: †Pachyporidae
- Genus: †Thamnopora
- Species: †T. boloniensis

Binomial name
- †Thamnopora boloniensis (Gosselet, 1877)

Synonyms
- Favosites boloniensis

Extinct species of coral

Thamnopora boloniensis is an extinct species of tabulate coral. Its name was Favosites boloniensis.
