= Windom shale =

- Stratigraphic range: Givetian ~387–389 Ma
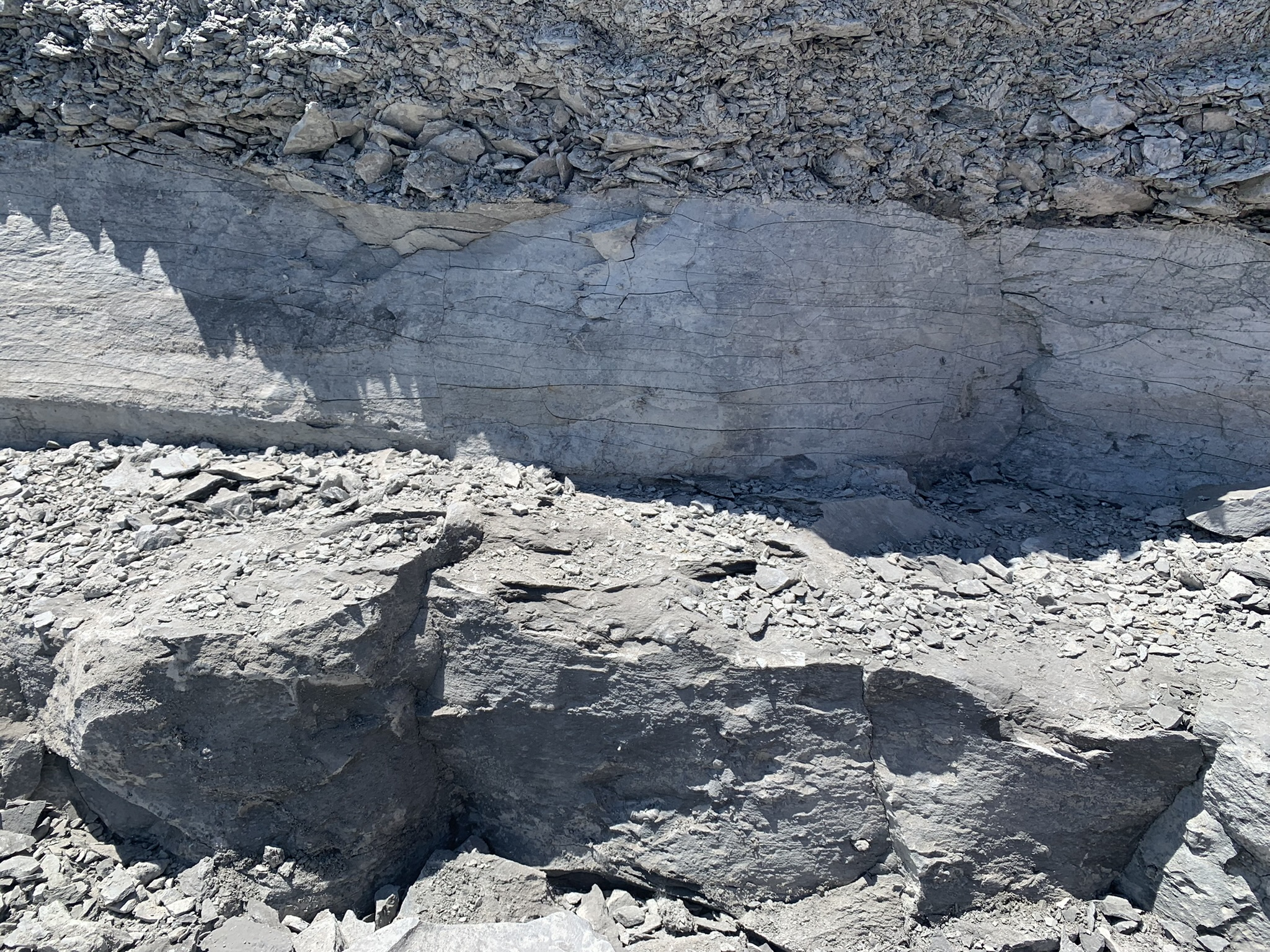
- Windom shale member of the Moscow formation, a trilobite pygidium (Eldredgeops rana) is exposed but not clearly visible
- Type: Member
- Unit of: Moscow formation
- Sub-units: Upper Windom, Lower Windom
- Underlies: North Evans limestone
- Overlies: Kashong Shale
- Area: Western New York
- Thickness: 15 meters

Lithology
- Primary: Shale
- Other: limestone

Location
- Region: New York
- Country: United States
- Extent: Western New York

Type section
- Named for: Windom, New York
- Named by: Amadeus William Grabau

The Windom shale or Windom member is a member of the Moscow formation in New York. It preserves fossils going back to the Givetian stage of the middle Devonian. The Windom shale is widely known for its abundance of trilobite fossils.

== History ==
=== Early Study ===
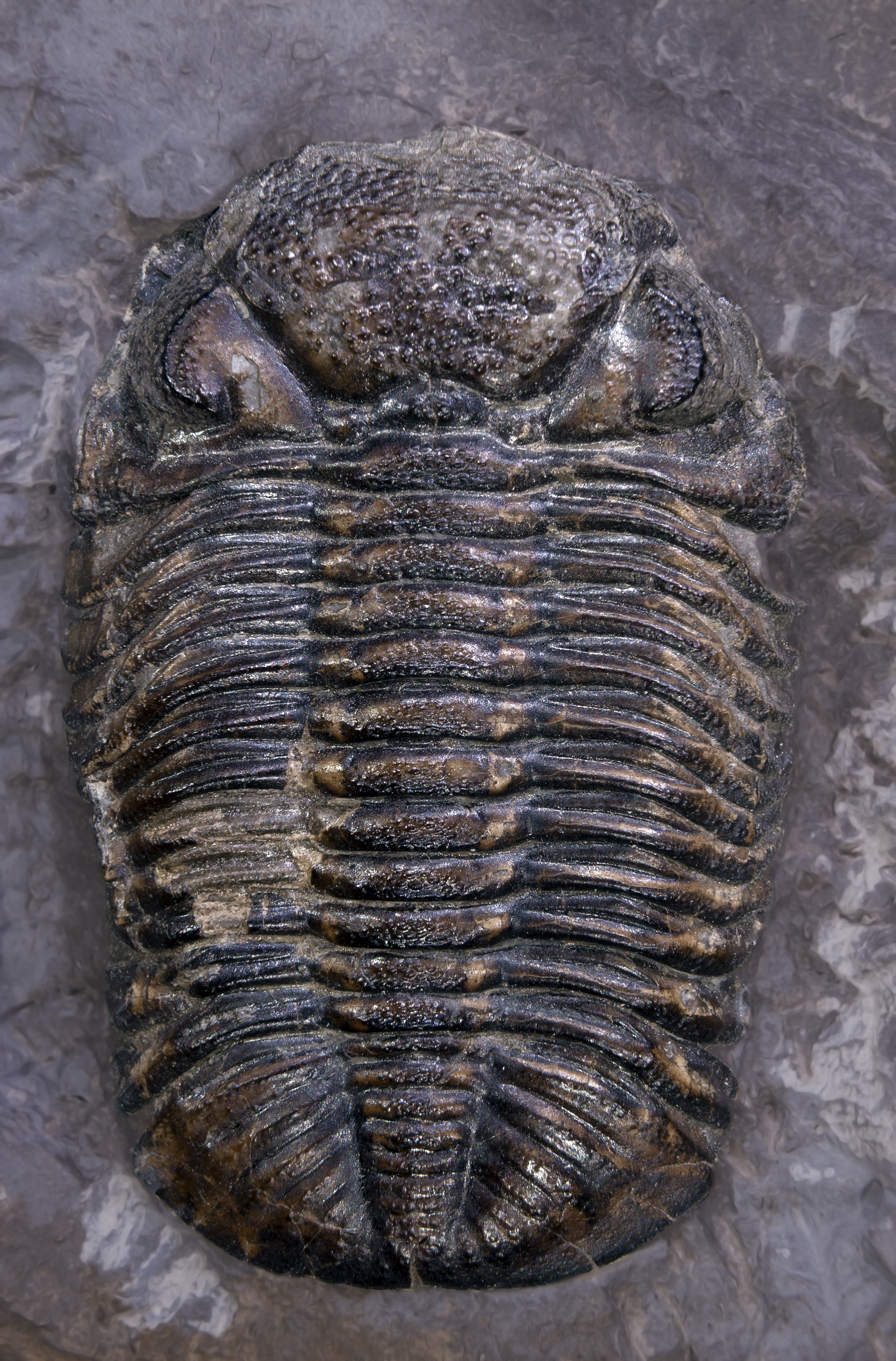
An Eldredgeops rana, the species described by Jacob Green in 1832 as “Calymene bufo”

One of the first people who may have described the scientific importance of the Windom was Jacob Green. In his book A monograph of the trilobites of North America: with coloured models of the species, he mentions an abundance of “Calymene bufo” in similar conditions to that of the Windom. Later on in 1935, David M. Delo's “Revision of the Phacopid trilobites” would name the genus Greenops in honor of Jacob Green's work.

"A fortunate blow of the hammer has fractured the rock which contains this trilobite, so neatly, as to present us at the same time with the petrified animal in an almost perfect state, and also with the mould or matrix in which it was imbedded.”

— Jacob Green, A monograph of the trilobites of North America: with coloured models of the species, P. 42

In 1840, the geologist Lardner Vanuxem first described the “Hamilton Formation” in Hamilton, New York. The American paleontologist James Hall, would be very influential in early scientific examination of the Hamilton group. American geologist and malacologist, Timothy Abbott Conrad would describe many species found in the shale today. The work of Hall, Vanuxem, Conrad and other geologists of the time would give the foundation of the study of the geologic context behind the Windom.

The Windom shale was first named by the American geologist Amadeus William Grabau in 1917. Paleobiologist Gustav Arthur Cooper’s 1929 dissertation, “The Stratigraphy of the Hamilton Group of New York” was another very influential work to the study of the Windom shale.

=== Penn Dixie Fossil Park and Nature Preserve ===
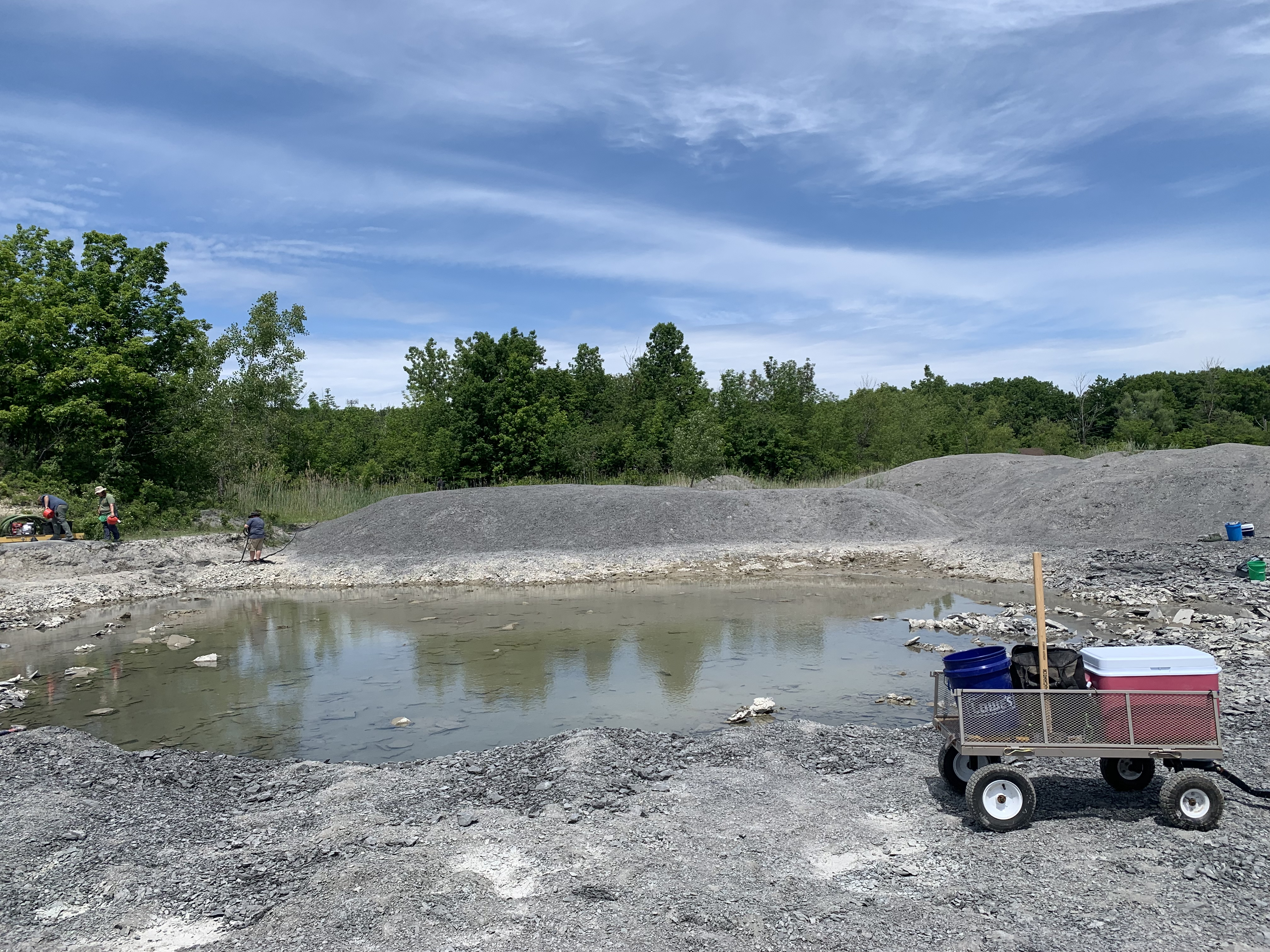
Fossil hunters look for trilobites and other fossils in the Penn Dixie site.

A major site for the Windom shale would be the “Bay View Quarry” (Known more commonly today as the Penn Dixie site), opened sometime in the 1930s by the Bessemer Cement and limestone company. They would operate the quarry due to the Windom shale's use as an ingredient in cement. Ownership of the quarry would be transferred to the Federal Portland Cement company sometime in the 1940s. In the late 1950s the Pennsylvania-Dixie cement company acquired the quarry.

During the 1970s the Bay View Quarry would go abandoned. Over the 30 years the quarry was abandoned, it built a reputation among educators for its well preserved fossils. When the Town of Hamburg purchased the abandoned quarry with the intention of turning it into a waste dump, lobbying efforts stepped in. The lobbying efforts merged to become the Hamburg Natural History Society, Inc., and successfully purchased the site in 1993 for its preservation. The site is today open to the public as the Penn Dixie fossil park and nature preserve.

== Geologic Context ==
The Windom shale was deposited in the Givetian stage of the Middle Devonian. The depositional environmental is from a shallow marine reef in the aerobic zone, although one of the beds suggests deposition in a dysaerobic zone. The bed known for being in a dysaerobic zone being the pyrite beds, where fossils are very often pyritized.

The erosion of the ancient Acadian mountains to the east was a large factor behind the deposition of the Windom. Streams and Rivers would bring clay and mud from inland into the sea. Some of the earliest swamps lined the coast, situated on floodplains. This depositional environment was known as the Catskill delta.

Carbonized wood, although rare, is known from the Windom. These fossils represent some of the first swamps of the Devonian.

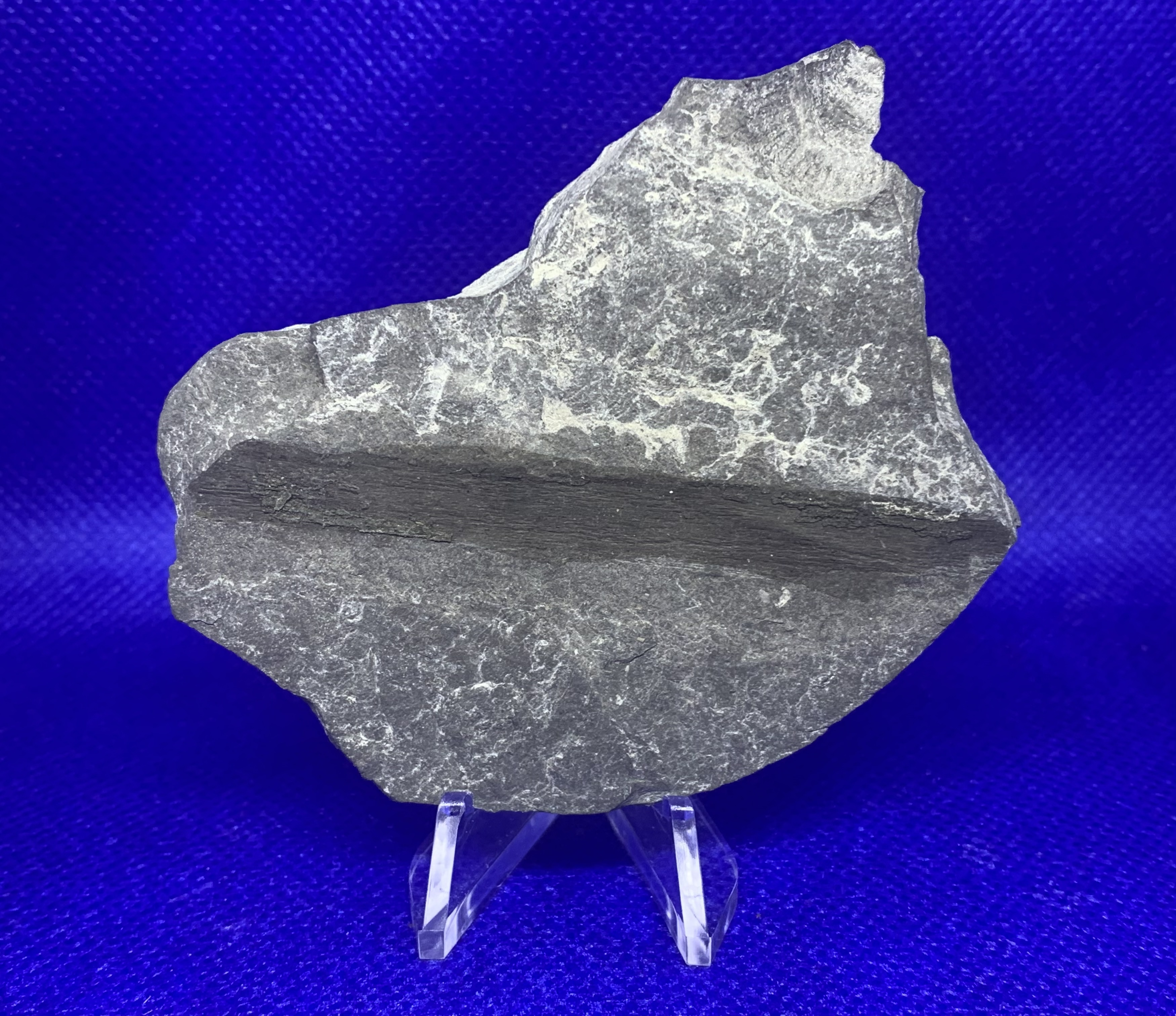
A piece of carbonized fossil driftwood from the Windom shale

== Stratigraphy ==
The Windom shale is mostly composed of shale, with some thin bands of limestone. The lowest and earliest layer of the Windom is the Bayview coral bed. This layer is known for abundant Rugose coral fossils. This is followed by the Smoke Creek Trilobite Bed. These beds are known for their abundant trilobites. Within the Upper Windom, there is a darker layer with pyritized fossils known as the Pyrite Beds.

== List of Paleobiota of the Windom Shale ==
=== Brachiopoda ===
• Allanella tullius (Hall, 1867)

• Ambocoelia umbonata (Conrad, 1842)

• Arcuaminetes scitulus (Hall, 1857)

• Athyris cora (Eaton, 1831)

• Athyris spiriferoides (Eaton, 1831)

• Atrypa reticularis (Linnaeus, 1758)

• Cupularostrum congregata (Conrad 1841)

• Cyrtina hamiltonensis (Hall, 1857)

• Devonochonetes coronatus (Conrad, 1842)

• Elita fimbriata (Conrad, 1842)

• Emanuella praeumbonata (Hall, 1857)

• Eumetabolotoechia multicostatum (Hall, 1860)

• Longispina mucronatus (Hall, 1843)

• Mediospirifer audaculus (Conrad, 1842)

• Megakozlowskiella sculptilis (Hall, 1843)

• Megastrophia concava (Hall, 1857)

• Meristella barrisi (Hall, 1860)

• Mesoleptostrophia junia (Hall, 1867)

• Mucrospirifer consobrinus (D’Obrigny 1850)

• Mucrospirifer mucronatus (Conrad, 1841)

• Protodouvillina inequistriata (Conrad, 1842)

• Protoleptostrophia perplana (Conrad, 1842)

• Pseudoatrypa devoniana (Webster, 1921)

• Rhipidomella penelope (Hall, 1861)

• Rhipidomella vanuxemi (Hall, 1857)

• Spinatrypa spinosa (Hall, 1843)

• Spinocyrtia granulosa (Conrad, 1839)

• Tropidoleptus carinatus (Conrad, 1839)

• Truncalosia truncata (Hall, 1843)

=== Bryozoa ===
• Atactotoechus furcatus

• Fenestella emaciata

• Leptotrypella ssp.

=== Cnidaria ===
• Amplexiphyllum hamiltoniae (Hall, 1876)

• Aulocystis dichotoma (Grabau, 1899)

• Aulocystis jacksoni (Grabau, 1899)

• Cystiphylloides americanum (Edwards & Haime, 1851

• Cystiphylloides conifollis (Hall, 1876)

• Favosites hamiltoniae (Hall, 1876)

• Hadrophyllum woodi (Grabau, 1899)

• Heliophyllum halli (Edwards & Hame, 1850)

• Pleurodictyum americanum (Roemer, 1876)

• Stereolasma rectum (Hall, 1876)

• Streptalasma ungula (Hall, 1876)

=== Echinodermata ===
• Ancyrocrinus bulbous (Hall, 1862)

• Deltacrinus clarus (Hall, 1862)

• Dolatocrinus liratus (Hall, 1862)

=== Mollusca ===
==== Bivalvia ====
• Nuculoidea corbuliformis (Hall & Whitfield, 1869)

• Nuculites triqueter (Conrad, 1841)

• Paleoneilo filosa (Conrad, 1842)

• Palaeoneilo sp.

• Pterinopecten sp.

==== Cephalopoda ====
• Michelinoceras ssp.

• Syproceras nuntium (Hall, 1861)

• Tornoceras uniangulare (Conrad, 1842)

==== Gastropoda ====
• Mourlonia itys (Hall, 1843)

• Naticonema lineata (Conrad, 1842)

• Platyceras thetis (Hall, 1861)

=== Trilobita ===
• Bellacartwrightia calderonae (Lieberman and Kloc, 1997)

• Bellacartwrightia whiteleyi (Lieberman & Kloc, 1997)

• Dipleura dekayi (Green, 1832)

• Eldredgeops rana (Green, 1832)

• Greenops barberi (Lieberman and Kloc, 1997)

• Greenops boothi (Delo, 1935)

• Monodechenella macrocephala (Hall, 1861)

• Pseudodechenella rowi (Green, 1838)

=== Cladoxylopsida ===
• Arachnoxylon
