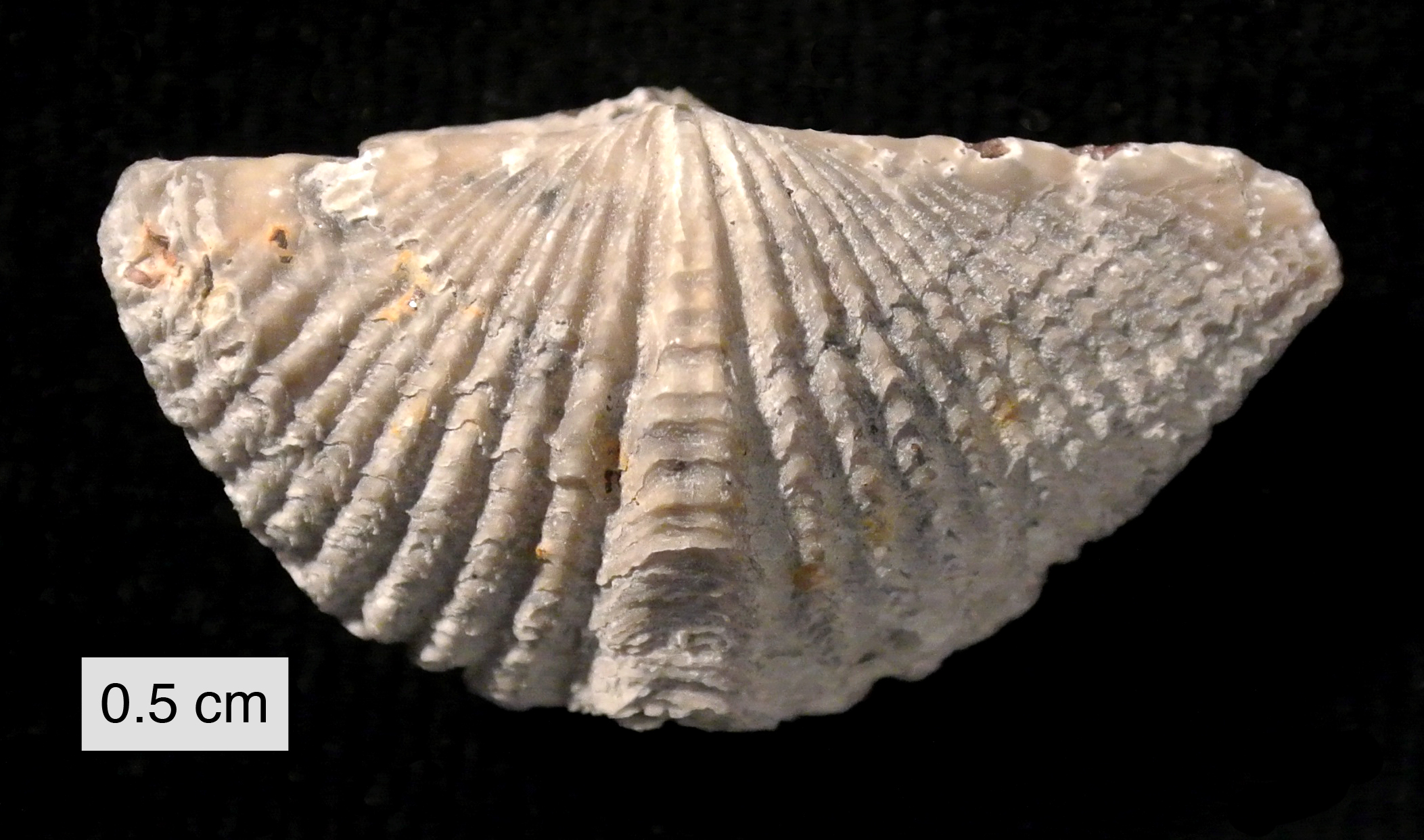
- Mucrospirifer mucronatus

Scientific classification
- Kingdom: Animalia
- Phylum: Brachiopoda
- Class: Rhynchonellata
- Order: †Spiriferida
- Suborder: †Delthyridina
- Superfamily: †Delthyridoidea
- Family: †Mucrospiriferidae
- Genus: †Mucrospirifer; Grabau, 1931

Type species
- Delthyris mucronatus Conrad, 1841

Species
- See text

= Mucrospirifer =

Mucrospirifer Temporal range: Emsian-Tournasian

Extinct genus of brachiopods

Mucrospirifer is a genus of extinct brachiopods in the class Rhynchonellata (Articulata) and the order Spiriferida. They are sometimes known as "butterfly shells". Like other brachiopods, they were filter feeders. These fossils occur mainly in Middle Devonian strata and appear to occur around the world, except in Australia and Antarctica.

The biconvex shell was typically 2.5 cm long, but sometimes grew to 4 cm. The shell of Mucrospirifer has a fold, sulcus and costae. It is greatly elongated along the hinge line, which extends outward to form sharp points. This gives them a fin- or wing-like appearance. The apex area (umbo) of the pedicle valve contains a small fold for the pedicle. Mucrospirifer lived in muddy marine sediments, and were attached to the sea floor via the pedicle. The shell sometimes looks like two seashells stuck together.

== Species ==
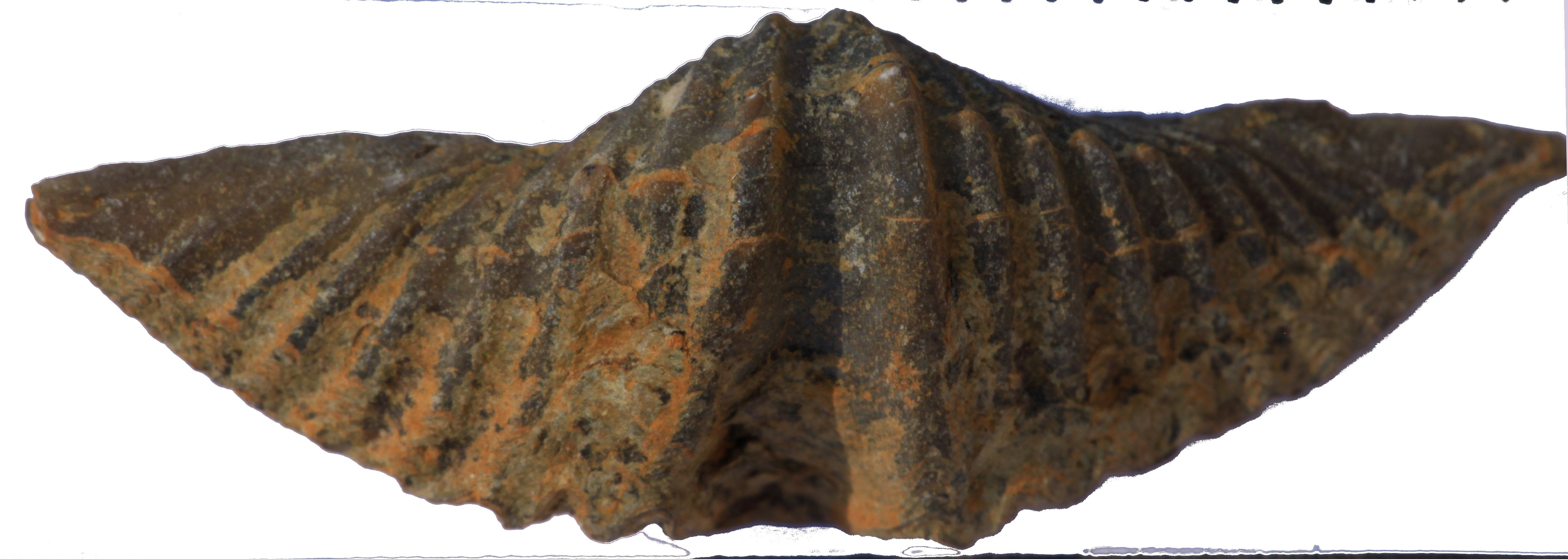
Mucrospirifer diluvianoides

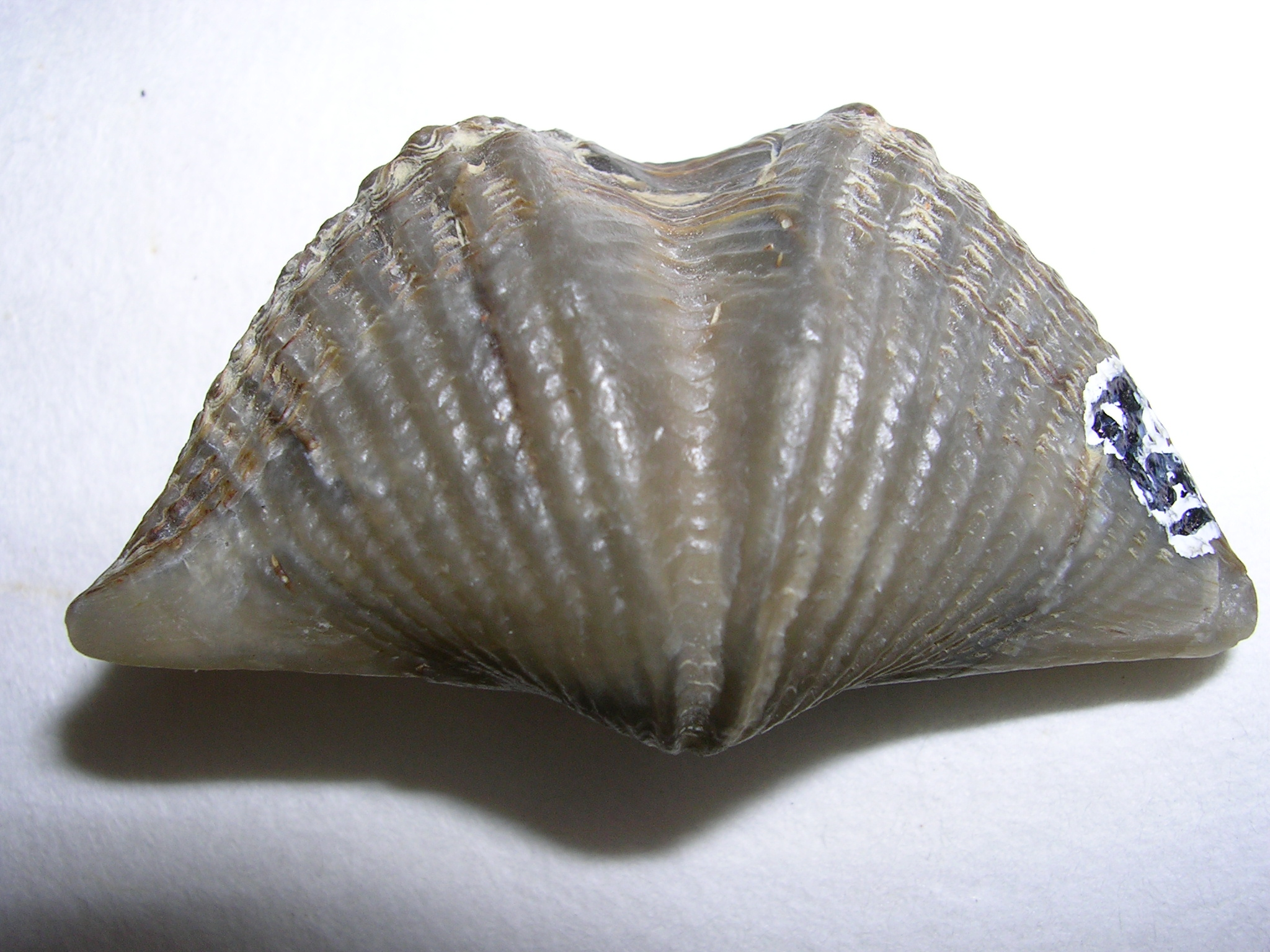
Mucrospirifer thedfordensis

- Mucrospirifer albanensis
- Mucrospirifer arkonensis
- Mucrospirifer bouchardi
- Mucrospirifer diluvianoides
- Mucrospirifer grabaui
- Mucrospirifer medfordsis
- Mucrospirifer mucronatus (Conrad, 1841)
- Mucrospirifer paradoxiformis
- Mucrospirifer profundus
- Mucrospirifer prolificus
- Mucrospirifer refugiensis
- Mucrospirifer thedfordensis
- Mucrospirifer williamsi
