= Pine Grove Township, Schuylkill County, Pennsylvania =

Township in Pennsylvania, US

Coordinates: 40°32′30″N 76°30′05″W

- Township
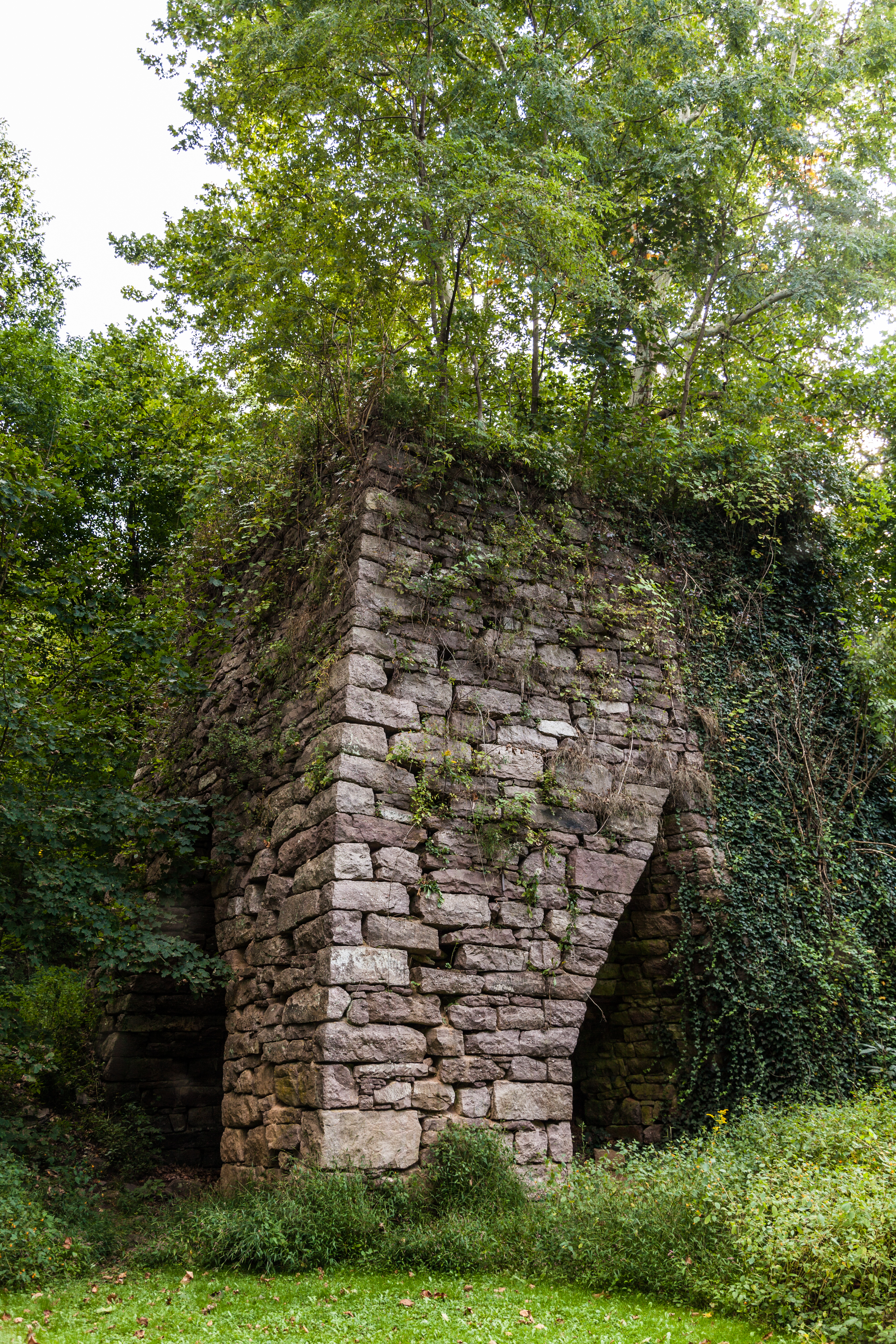
- Swatara Furnace

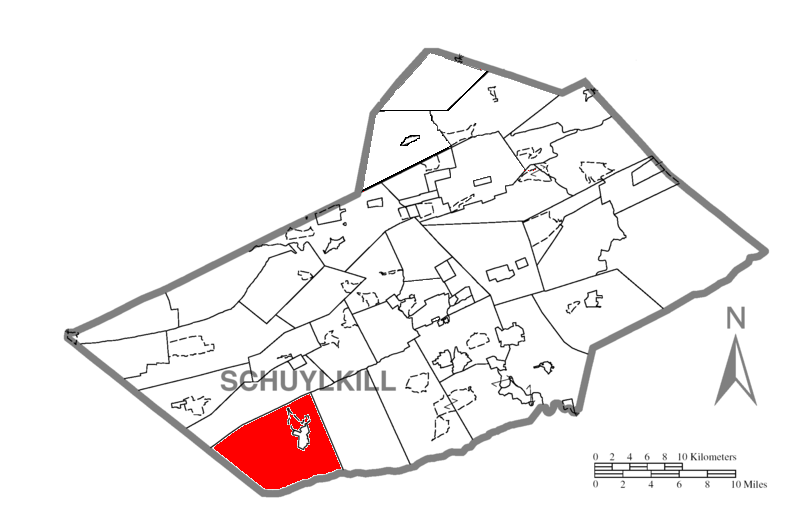
- Map of Schuylkill County, Pennsylvania Highlighting Pine Grove Township

- Map of Schuylkill County, Pennsylvania
- Country: United States
- State: Pennsylvania
- County: Schuylkill
- Settled: 1750
- Incorporated: 1811

Area
  - Total: 37.97 sq mi (98.33 km^{2})
  - Land: 37.80 sq mi (97.91 km^{2})
  - Water: 0.16 sq mi (0.42 km^{2})

Population (2020)
  - Total: 4,024 ▼
  - Estimate (2021): 4,027
  - Density: 107.3/sq mi (41.42/km^{2})
- Time zone: UTC-5 (Eastern (EST))
  - Summer (DST): UTC-4 (EDT)
- FIPS code: 42-107-60464
- Website: https://www.pinegrovetownship.com/

Pine Grove Township is a township that is located in Schuylkill County, Pennsylvania, United States. The population was 4,024 at the time of the 2020 census.

== History ==
Swatara Furnace was added to the National Register of Historic Places in 1991.

== Geography ==
According to the United States Census Bureau, the township has a total area of 38.3 square miles (99.3 km^{2}), of which 38.2 square miles (98.9 km^{2}) is land and 0.2 square mile (0.4 km^{2}) (0.39%) is water. It contains the census-designated place of Ravine.

== Recreation ==
Portions of the Pennsylvania State Game Lands Number 80, through which the Appalachian National Scenic Trail passes, are located in the southern portion of the township. The western portion of the Sweet Arrow Lake County Park is located along the eastern border of the township.

== Demographics ==
Historical population
Census	Pop.	Note	%±
2010	4,123		—
2020	4,024		−2.4%
2021 (est.)	4,027		0.1%
U.S. Decennial Census

At the time of the 2000 census there were 3,930 people, 1,570 households, and 1,182 families living in the township.

The population density was 102.9 inhabitants per square mile (39.7/km^{2}). There were 1,696 housing units at an average density of 44.4 per square mile (17.1/km^{2}).

The racial makeup of the township was 99.21% White, 0.03% Native American, 0.25% Asian, 0.05% from other races, and 0.46% from two or more races. Hispanic or Latino of any race were 0.33%.

Of the 1,570 households that were counted during the census, 30.6% had children who were under the age of eighteen, 62.7% were married couples living together, 7.3% had a female householder with no husband present, and 24.7% were non-families. 21.0% were one-person households and 12.0% were one-person households with residents who were aged sixty-five or older.

The average household size was 2.50 and the average family size was 2.87.

The age distribution was 23.2% of residents who were under the age of eighteen, 6.1% who were aged eighteen to twenty-four, 28.5% who were aged twenty-five to sixty-four, 24.2% who were aged forty-five to sixty-four, and 18.1% who were aged sixty-five or older. The median age was forty years.

For every one hundred females, there were 98.2 males. For every one hundred females who were aged eighteen or older, there were 95.8 males.

The median household income was $38,933 and the median family income was $42,813. Males had a median income of $32,478 compared with that of $21,707 for females.

The per capita income for the township was $17,011.

Approximately 5.3% of families and 6.5% of the population were living below the poverty line, including 6.6% of those who were under the age of eighteen and 6.5% of those who were aged sixty-five or older.
