= Mahantango Formation =

Geological formation in the United States

- Stratigraphic range: Givetian, ~387 Ma
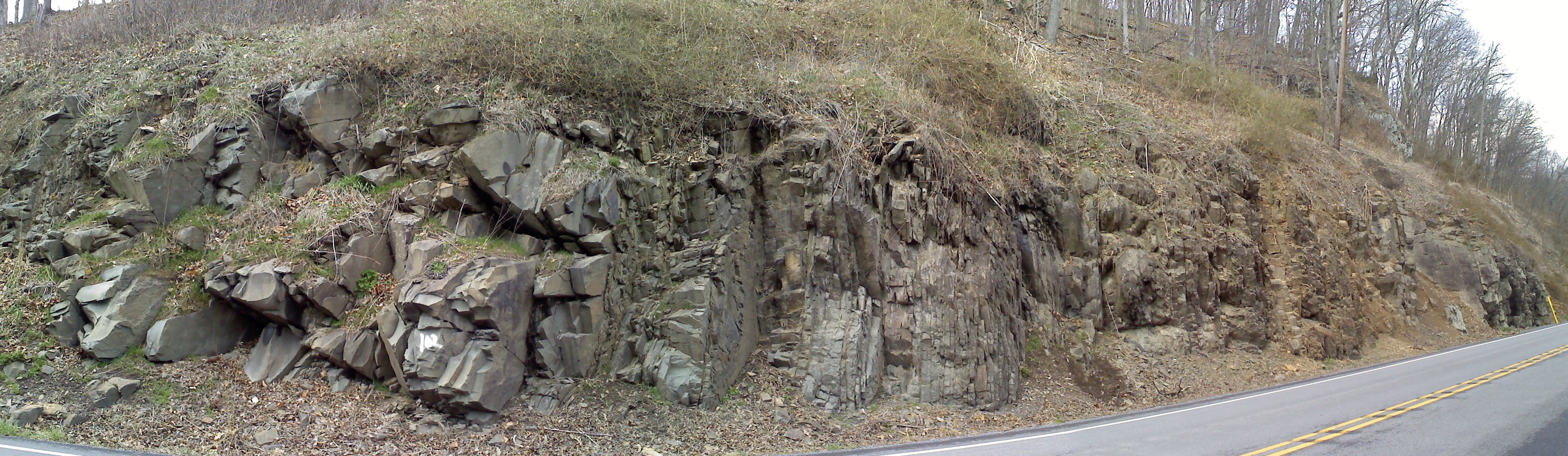
- Outcrop of the Mahantango on Rt. 522, Fulton County, Pennsylvania
- Type: Geological formation
- Unit of: Hamilton Group
- Sub-units: See: Description
- Underlies: Harrell Shale and Tully Formation
- Overlies: Marcellus Formation

Lithology
- Primary: Shale
- Other: Limestone, Siltstone

Location
- Region: Appalachian Basin of eastern North America
- Extent: Maryland, Ohio, Pennsylvania, Virginia, and West Virginia

Type section
- Named for: Mahantango Creek

The Devonian Mahantango Formation is a mapped bedrock unit in Pennsylvania, West Virginia, and Maryland. It is named for the North branch of the Mahantango Creek in Perry and Juniata counties in Pennsylvania. It is a member of the Hamilton Group, along with the underlying the Marcellus Formation Shale. South of Tuscarora Mountain in south central Pennsylvania, the lower members of this unit were also mapped as the Montebello Formation. Details of the type section and of stratigraphic nomenclature for this unit as used by the U.S. Geological Survey are available on-line at the National Geologic Map Database.

== Description ==
The Mahantango Formation is a gray, brown, and olive siltstone and shale, characterized by coarsening-upward cycles.

== Stratigraphic setting ==
Generalized stratigraphic nomenclature for the Middle Devonian strata in the Appalachian Basin.

The Mahantango Formation is typically found conformably overlying the Marcellus Formation, and underlying the Tully Limestone (where present).

The Mahantango has been divided into four members:

- Tully Limestone: a fossiliferous calcareous shale. The Tully is a conspicuous formation, which separates the Mahantango from the Hamilton Group.
- Sherman Ridge: Olive gray, fossiliferous, claystone and siltstone with interbedded fine sandstone coarsening upward.
- Montebello Sandstone: Olive gray, fossiliferous, coarse to fine-grained sandstone, interbedded with siltstone and claystone, in coarsening upward cycles.
- Fisher Ridge (also described as the Dalmatia and Turkey Ridge): silty claystone, siltstone, and very fine-grained sandstone.

The Sherman Ridge and Fisher Ridge are ridge-formers.

In south-central Pennsylvania, the Mahantango includes the Clearville, Frame, Chaneysville, and Gander Run Members.

== Fossils ==
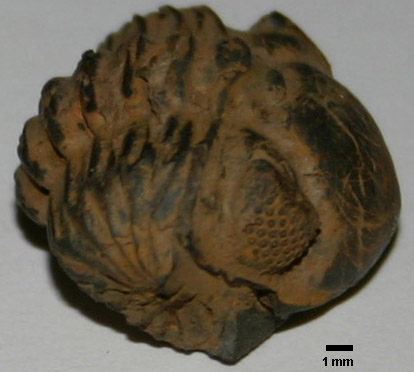
Enrolled Phacops rana from an outcrop of the Mahantango near Milesburg, Pennsylvania, with schizochroal eye visible

There are numerous marine fossils found in the Mahantango including brachiopods, crinoids, trilobites, bivalves, and bryozoans.

=== Brachiopods ===
- Athyris
- Chonetes
- Mucrospirifer
- Protoleptostrophia
- Tropidoleptus

=== Crinoids ===
- Ancyrocrinus

=== Trilobites ===
- Basidechenella
- Dipleura
- Eldredgeops (formerly assigned to Phacops)
- Greenops

=== Bivalves ===
- Actinodesma
- Grammysioidea
- Grammysia
- Leiopteria
- Modiomorpha
- Nuculites
- Orthonota

=== Bryozoa ===
- Atactotoechus furcatus

=== Coral ===
- Pleurodictyum
- Thamnoptychia

=== Gastropods ===
- Bembexia
- Crenistriella
- Dictyotomaria?
- Glyptotomaria
- Loxonema
- Paleozygopleura
- Platyceras

=== Cephalopods ===
- Tornoceras
- Agoniatites
- Spyroceras
- Michelinoceras
- Bactrites
- Striacoceras
- Koenenites?

== Age ==
Relative age dating of the Mahantango places it in the Middle Devonian period, being deposited between 392 and 385 (±3) million years ago. It rests conformably atop the Marcellus Formation shale. Its upper contact is also conformable to the Trimmers Rock Formation and Harrell Shale. In 2012, Read and Erikson reported the formation as Givetian in Virginia.

== Interpretation of depositional environments ==
The Mahantango represents a terrestrial to marine transition zone that went through many transgressive-regression sequences. The fine-grained rocks represent a shallow sea environment and accounts for many of the fossils. Coarser grained sediments represent near-shore environments, beaches, or possibly delta lobes. These environments were tide-dominated and often had violent storms. The Montebello Sandstone member is an example of a storm dominated rock unit. Brachiopod fossils are scattered in massive sandstone beds throughout the rock unit, while the Sherman Ridge member is more laminated with fossilized ripple marks often indicating tidal current directions.

== See also ==
- Geology of Pennsylvania
