= Williams Valley Railroad =

Overview
- Headquarters: Tower City, Pennsylvania
- Locale: Pennsylvania
- Dates of operation: 1891–1947
- Successor: Reading Company

Technical
- Track gauge: 4 ft 8 1/2 in (1,435 mm) standard gauge

The Williams Valley Railroad was an anthracite-hauling railroad that operated in Schuylkill and Dauphin Counties, Pennsylvania from 1892 to 1971. For most of that time, it was a subsidiary of the Reading Railroad. It extended the Reading's Brookside Branch at Brookside 11 miles (18 km) down the Williams Valley to Lykens.

== History ==
The railroad was originally chartered on September 19, 1891, to connect Brookside (the site of a large colliery served by the Reading) with Lykens. The line was opened on July 1, 1892, from Lykens to a point on the Reading known as Williams Valley Junction. The railroad owned one engine, a Baldwin 2-6-0 named "A.F. Baker". The railroad owned three passenger cars in 1894; these were presumably used to operate "miner's trains" for the colliery workers, as was done on the connecting Reading lines.

The Reading owned about a quarter of the line's bonds by 1906, and obtained control of the line's stock from 1908 to 1909. About this time, the Reading discontinued passenger service on its connecting lines, and presumably on the Williams Valley as well. It was not formally leased to the Reading until January 1, 1929, and was merged into the Reading Company on December 1, 1947.

After the Reading takeover, the former Brookside (or Good Spring) Branch and the Williams Valley were operated together as the Williams Valley Branch, from Tremont to Lykens. Around 1963, the end of the branch was cut back from Lykens to East Lykens, and the rest of the Williams Valley was abandoned in 1971 due to the decline in coal mining.

== Route ==
External image
- Camelback locomotive on the hand-operated turntable at Lykens.

From Williams Valley Junction, located high on Big Lick Mountain north of Tower City, the Williams Valley Railroad switched back to the west to a point north of Reinerton. It then switched back again to the east to descend further through Tower City and Sheridan. These switchbacks were laid out on a steep 3.3% grade. By Williamstown, the railroad had dropped to the bottom of the valley and paralleled Wiconisco Creek. It crossed to the south side of the creek in Williamstown and followed the south edge of the valley down to Lykens.

Stations as of 1963:

Name	Length		Notes
Name	mi	km	Notes
Williams Valley Junction	0.0	0.0	Connection with Brookside Br.
Reiner	2.6	4.2	
Tower City	3.1	5.0	
Sheridan	4.4	7.1	
Green Fields	6.0	9.7	
Williamstown	6.6	10.6	
East Lykens	10.5	16.9	
Lykens	11.1	17.9	Interchange with Lykens Valley Railroad (PRR)
