= Geology of Orkney =

Geology of Scottish islands

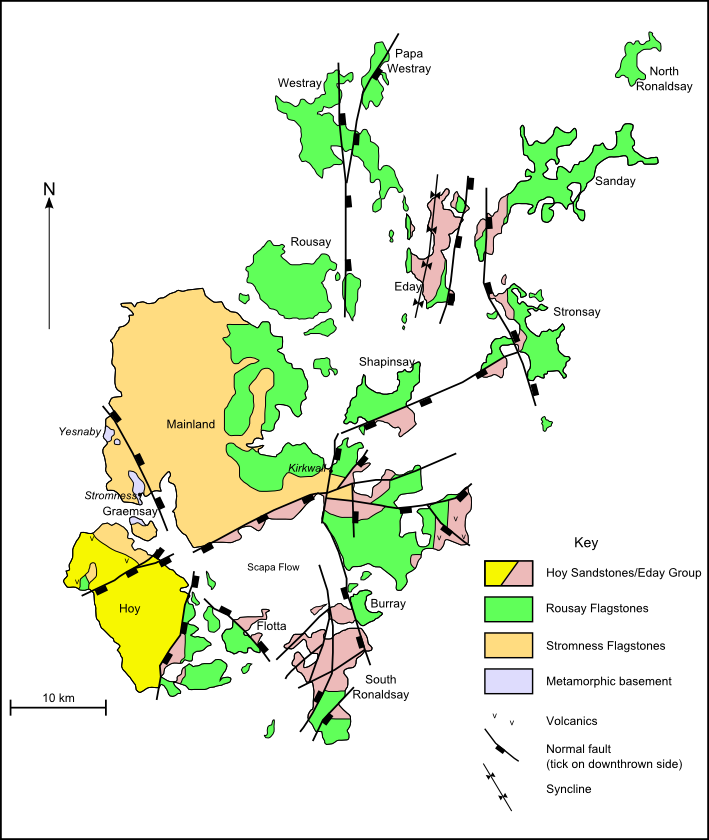
Sketch geological map of Orkney

The geology of the Orkney islands in northern Scotland is dominated by the Devonian Old Red Sandstone (ORS). In the southwestern part of Mainland, this sequence can be seen to rest unconformably on a Moinian type metamorphic basement.

== Metamorphic basement ==
Metamorphic rocks are exposed near Stromness and Yesnaby on Mainland and on Graemsay. Most of the basement consists of granitic gneisses and later minor intrusions. These rocks are similar to those exposed in northern Caithness and have been correlated with the Loch Eil Group of the late Proterozoic Loch Ness Supergroup sequence. The unconformity at the base of the overlying Devonian rocks is highly irregular, with the exposed basement forming hills in this buried land surface.

== Devonian ==
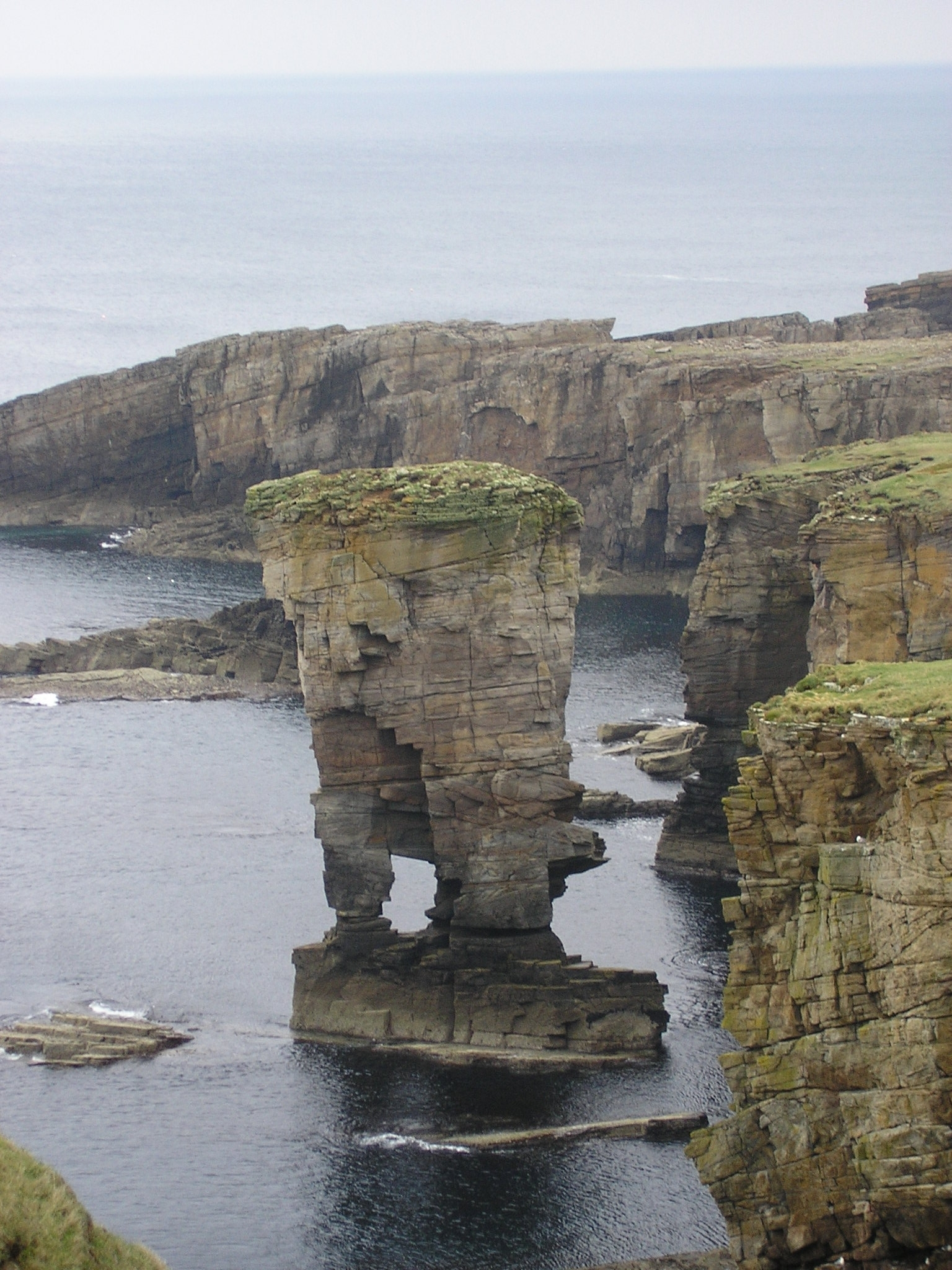
Dune cross-bedded aeolian Yesnaby Sandstone of probable Lower Devonian age, Yesnaby, Mainland Orkney

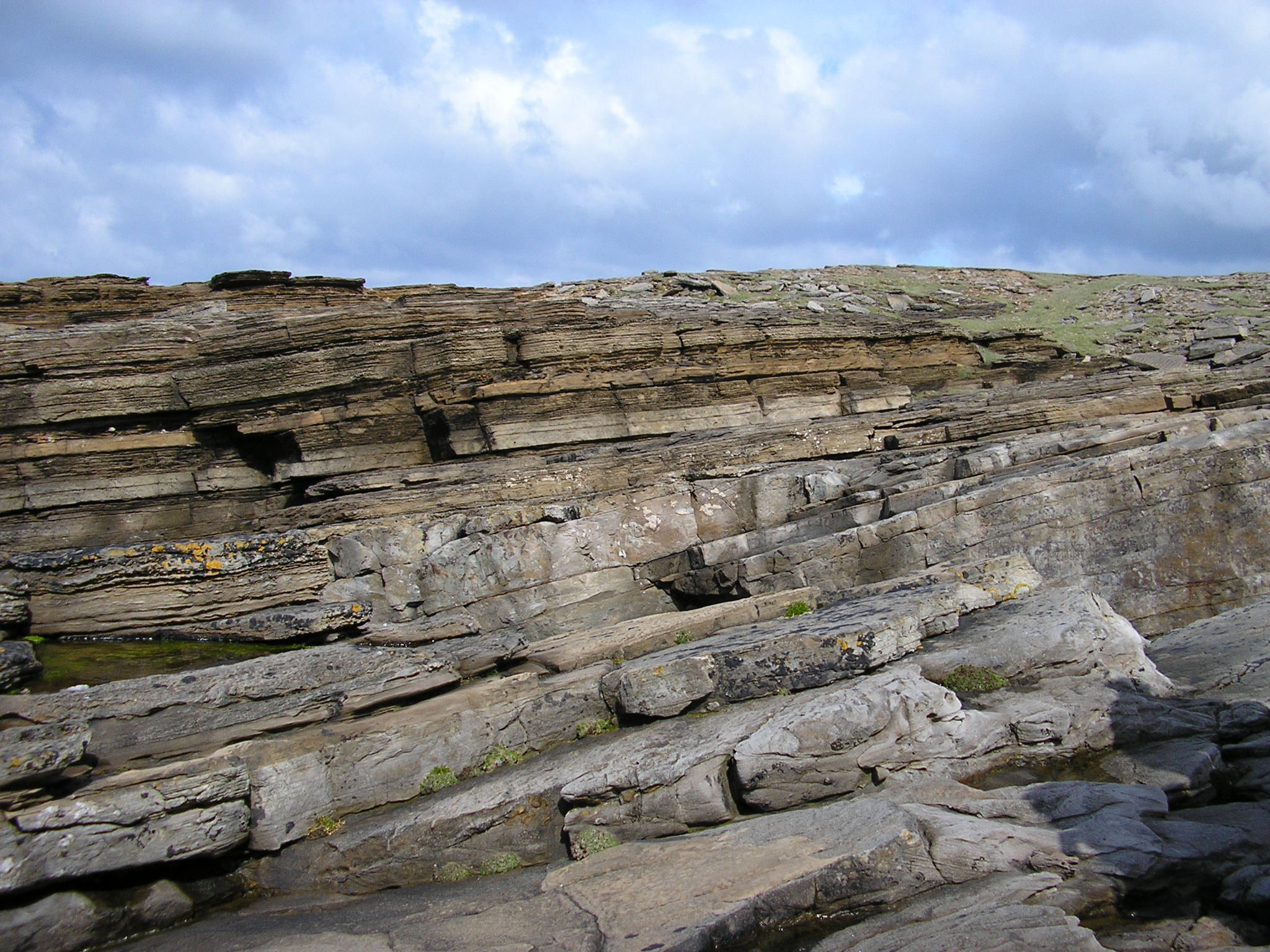
Angular unconformity between Middle Devonian Lower Stromness Flagstone and underlying Yesnaby Sandstone of probable Lower Devonian age

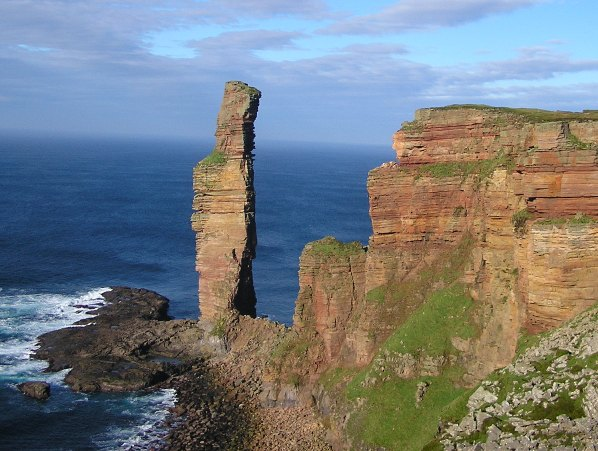
Old Man of Hoy, Upper Middle Devonian fluvial sandstones resting on basalt

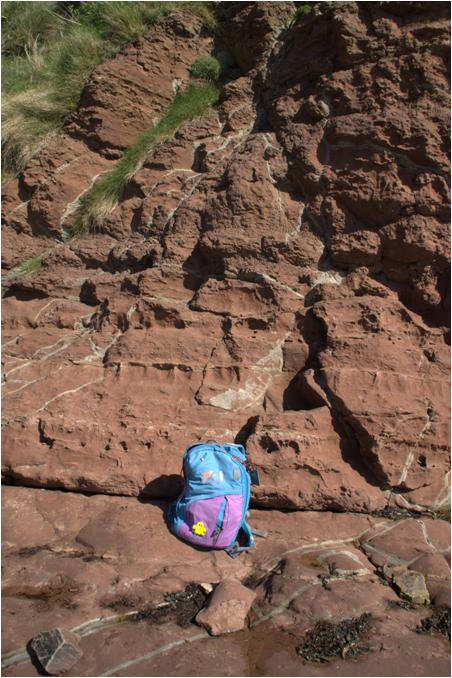
Brick-red Eday Marl, Bay of Birstane, reduced to green colour along fractures

The stratigraphic breakdown of the Devonian sequence has traditionally been into Lower, Middle and Upper ORS due to a general lack of biostratigraphic control. These divisions are now known to approximate to the Lower, Middle and Upper divisions of the Devonian.

=== Lower Devonian ===
Rocks of probable lower Devonian age are exposed near Yesnaby, on western Mainland. A ridge of granitic basement divides the Harra Ebb Formation, a sequence of breccias, conglomerates and sandstones deposited in an alluvial fan setting, from the Yesnaby Sandstone which was deposited in an aeolian setting. The contact with the overlying Middle Devonian lacustrine Lower Stromness Flagstones is an angular unconformity.

=== Middle Devonian ===
Most of the Old Red Sandstone of Orkney is Middle Devonian. The lower part of the sequence, mostly Eifelian in age, is dominated by lacustrine beds of the lower and upper Stromness Flagstones that were deposited in Lake Orcadie. The two flagstones sequences are divided by the Sandwick fish bed, equivalent to the Achanarras formation of Caithness, representing an unusually persistent, deep and widespread lake that filled much of the Orcadian Basin. The sequence continues with the Rousay flagstones deposited in a similar lacustrine environment. The flagstones show a marked cyclicity in their sedimentation, with 86 such cycles being counted for the whole sequence. These are interpreted as representing regular climatically driven changes in lake level caused by Milankovitch cyclicity.

The Eday Group overlies the Rousay Flagstones and represents a change to dominantly fluvial/aeolian deposition with only occasional lacustrine intervals. The Eday Group consists of three sandstone units, the lower, middle and upper Eday Sandstones separated by the Eday Flagstones and Eday Marl respectively. The Eday Marl consists mainly of red and green mudstones and siltstones and is thought to have been deposited in a river floodplain environment. Locally pseudomorphs of halite have been found and rarely marine microfossils (scolecodonts) indicating that the basin was affected by occasional marine incursions at this time.

The age and stratigraphic equivalents of the Hoy sandstone sequence are a matter of continuing debate. Traditionally the presence of an unconformity at the base of the lavas beneath these sandstones on southwestern Hoy has been interpreted to mark a major time break. More recent studies have suggested that this unconformity is of only local significance as a hiatus of this age has not been recognised elsewhere in the Orcadian Basin sequence. It has been proposed that the Hoy sandstones are the lateral equivalents of the Eday Group, the thickness and associated facies changes being caused by active extensional faulting during deposition. The presence of lavas within the Eday Flagstone Formation has been used to lend support to this idea, but differences in the chemistry between these lavas and those on Hoy mean that such a correlation remains uncertain.

=== Upper Devonian ===
The Upper Eday Sandstone is considered to extend from the Upper Givetian into the Lower Frasnian in age. However, there is no biostratigraphic data available to confirm this suggestion. Hydrocarbon exploration wells drilled in the Inner and Outer Moray Firth basins show similar sequences continuing without break into the Lower Carboniferous.

== Structure ==
The Devonian and older rocks of Orkney are cut by a series of WSW-ENE to N-S trending faults, many of which were active during deposition of the Devonian sequences. The largest of these faults are the North Scapa Fault, East Scapa Fault and Bring-Risa Fault. Both the North Scapa and Brims-Risa faults show evidence of local reversal along part of their lengths, thought to be due to a period of transpressional deformation along the Great Glen Fault system that lies just to the east of the islands, during the Carboniferous. Small-scale folding is common and one large-scale fold is developed, the north–south trending Eday syncline. This syncline is parallel to neighbouring normal faults and thickness variations in the lower Eday Sandstone indicate that this structure was active during the middle Devonian.

== Intrusions ==
Dykes of lamprophyre and more rarely dolerite are exposed in many parts of Orkney. They trend mainly NE-SW to N-S and are dated as Late Permian, associated with a period of crustal extension.

== Petroleum geology ==
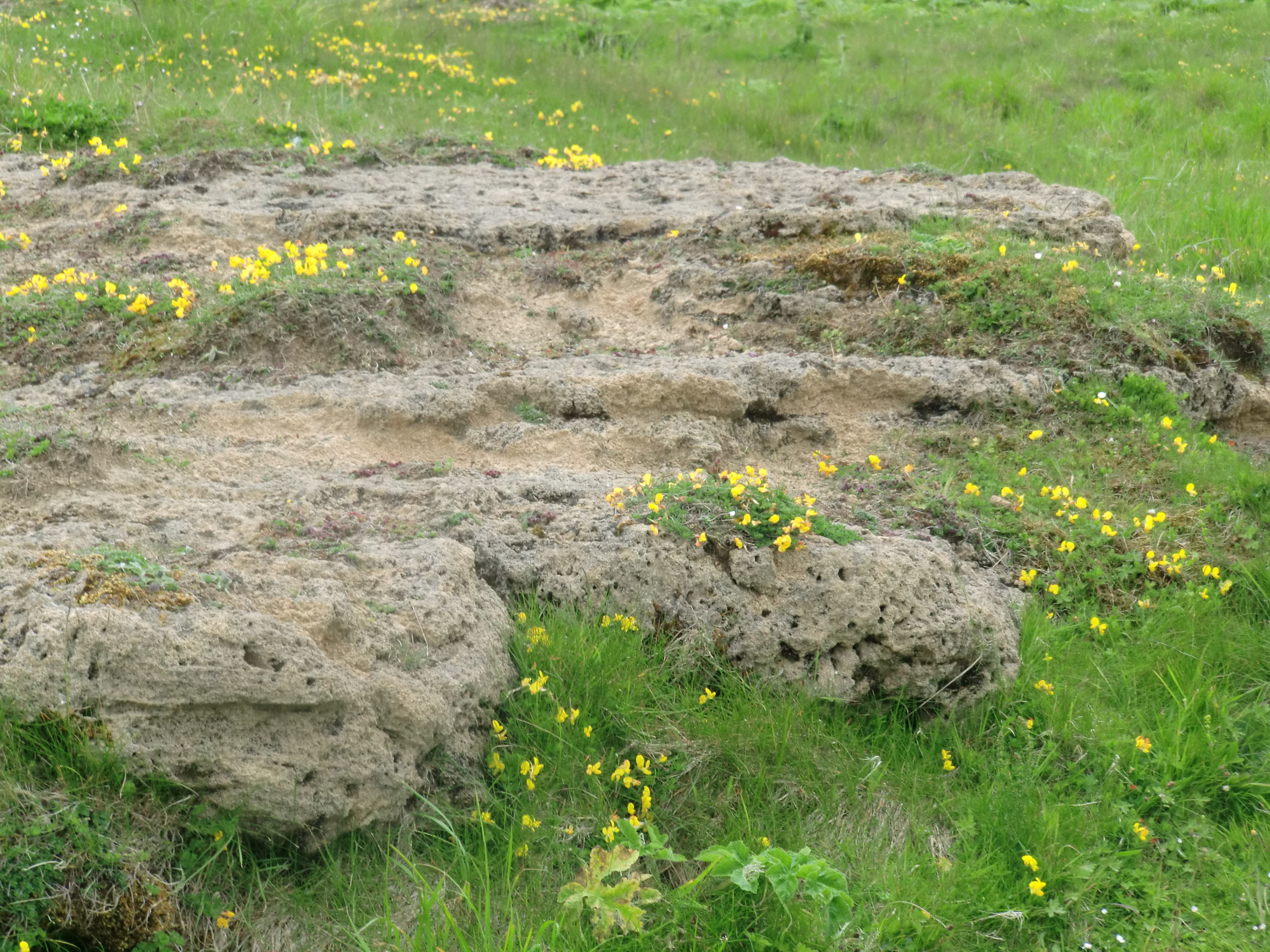
Quaternary Eolianite outcrop at Aikerness on the Mainland

The presence of bitumens throughout Orkney show that hydrocarbons have at least locally been produced and migrated. The permanent lake laminites from the flagstone sequences are moderate to good source rocks and are currently marginally mature at the surface as a result of burial after the Devonian. Two large exhumed oil accumulations have been described from Orkney, the Yesnaby and Houton Head reservoir systems. At Yesnaby bitumens occur throughout the presumed trap in the aeolian Yesnaby Sandstone with good porosity and permeability. At Houton Head, bitumens are found within a large area of aeolian/fluvial lower Eday Sandstone of similarly good reservoir characteristics.

== Quaternary deposits ==
Glacial and periglacial sediments are found locally throughout Orkney. A full history of the glaciations is not recorded with the last glaciation being the only event for which there is much evidence.
