= Clett =

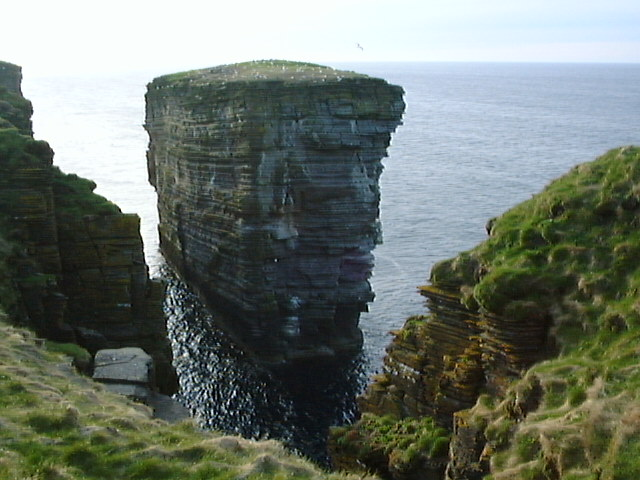
Clett island, off Holborn Head

Clett is a name used for many uninhabited Scottish islets and one to the south, though also in the area inhabited by Vikings. They include -

- One at 58.623644°N 3.5424908°W, near the north coast of Caithness, just to the west Holborn Head north of Scrabster. It rises sheer from the sea and is formed of Devonian Thurso Flagstone, also known as Caithness old red sandstone, part of the Caithness Flagstone Group, which has been eroded to leave a gap of about 15 m (49 ft) between the 30 m (98 ft) high Clett and Holborn Head.
- About 5 km (3.1 mi) to its west is Clett of Thusater, also known as Wester Clett,
- Little Clett, Brough is about 10 km (6.2 mi) to its east.
- Shetland has two islets named Clett. One is to the south-east of Wells, just south of Westerwick. It consists of five islets rising to 24 m (79 ft), with low cliffs and a cover of grass.
- The other islet near Wells lies in Voe of Dale, north-west of it and may have had a promontory fort.
- Another Clett is just off the north-west coast of Skye, north of Isay and just to the west of Waternish. It too is grass covered and has cormorants and shags and is made up of basalt/dolerite columns.
- The only Clett Rock not in Scotland is a rocky islet, just off the Isle of Man coast, near Baldrine.
