= Yesnaby =

Coordinates: 59.023°N 3.352°W

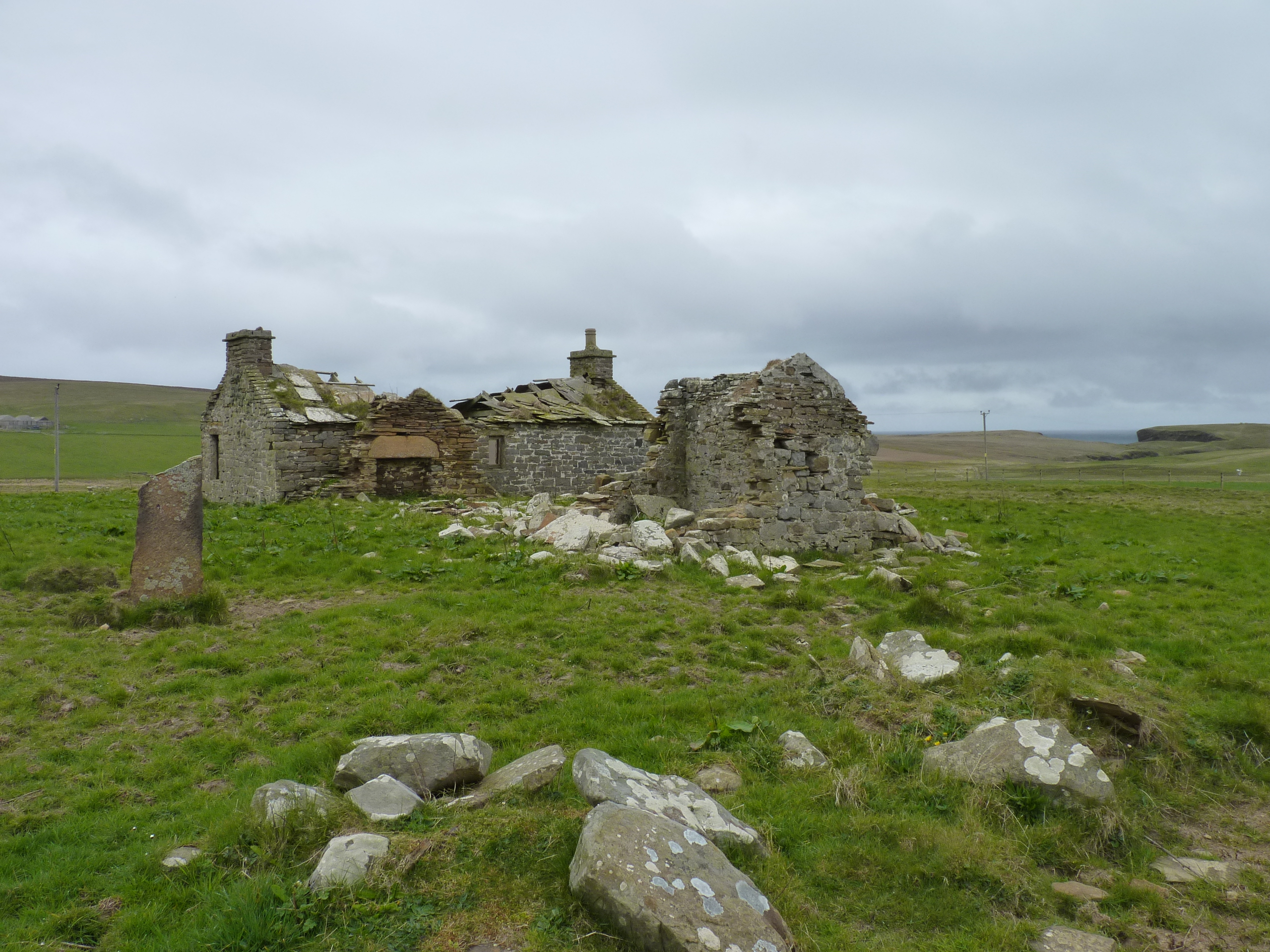

- Location within Orkney
- Civil parish: Sandwick
- Council area: Orkney Islands
- Country: Scotland
- Sovereign state: United Kingdom
- Police: Scotland
- Fire: Scottish
- Ambulance: Scottish

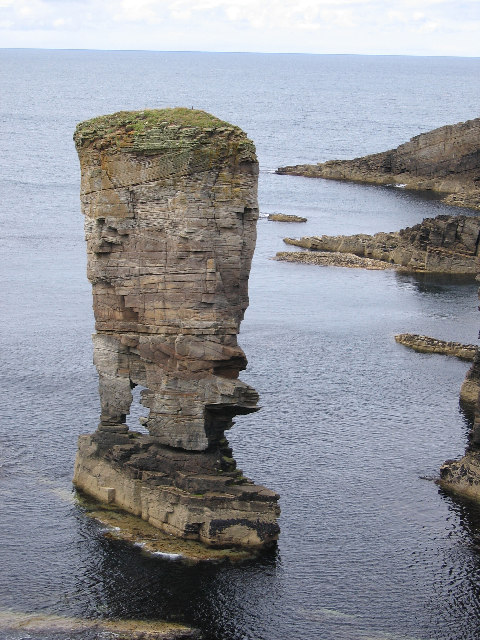
Yesnaby Castle sea stack

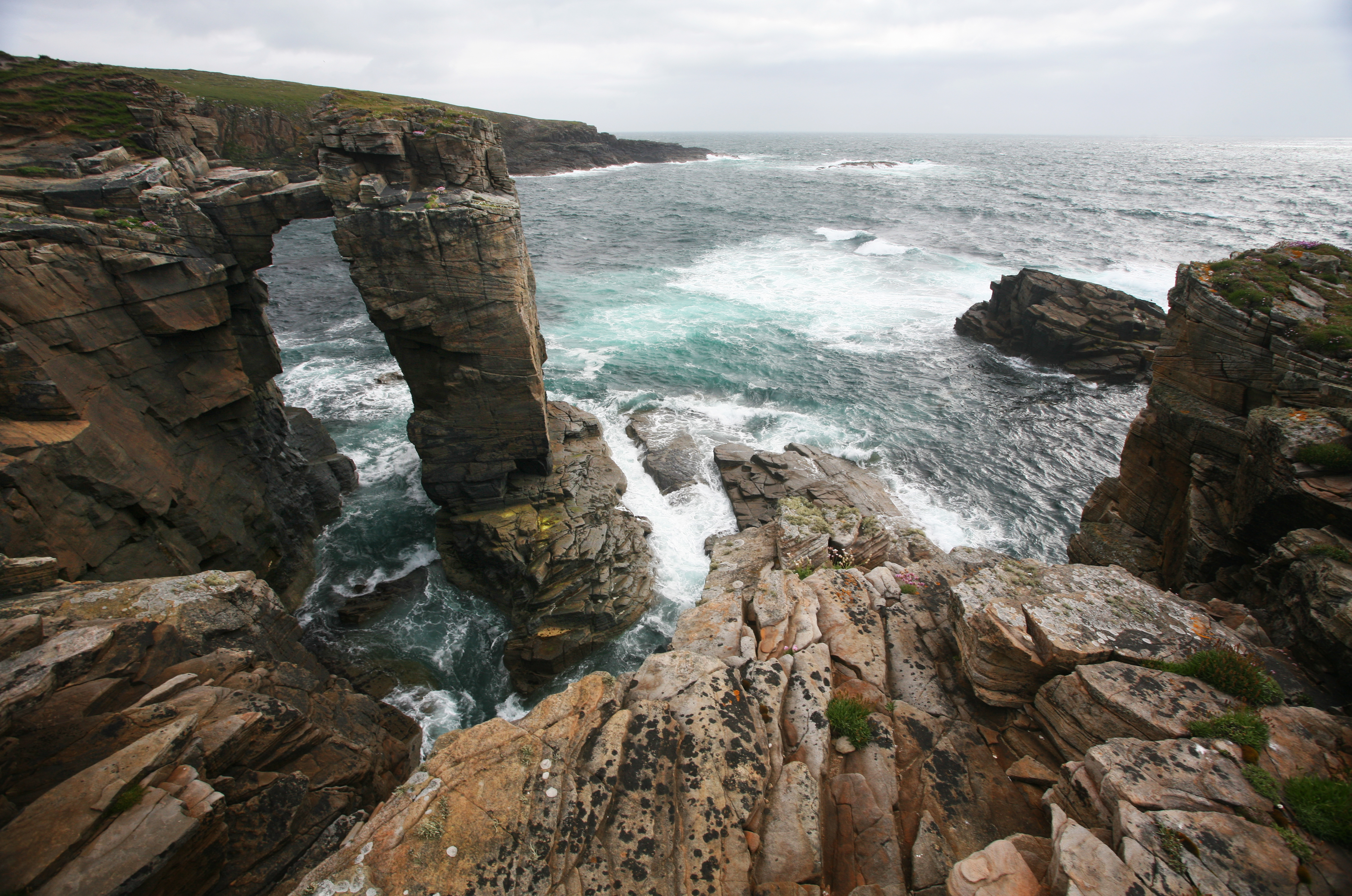
Yesnaby Cliffs with a westerly wind blowing

Yesnaby (historic: Yeskenaby, Yestnaby) is a historic township in Sandwick, on the west coast of Orkney Mainland, Scotland, south of Skara Brae. It is renowned for its spectacular Old Red Sandstone coastal cliff scenery which includes sea stacks, blowholes, geos and frequently boiling seas. A car park, coastal trail and interpretive panels serve visitors. The area is popular with climbers because of Yesnaby Castle, a two-legged sea stack just south of the Brough of Bigging. The stack is sometimes described as a smaller version of the Old Man of Hoy. Yesnaby is also one of the very few places where Primula scotica grows.

== Geology ==
The coastal cliffs are formed from the Lower Devonian sandstones ascribed to the Yesnaby Sandstone Group - a set of geological formations restricted to the Yesnaby area, and to the overlying beds of the Lower Stromness Flagstones. Fossil stromatolites from 390 to 400 million years ago can be found in the cliffs in the latter. They are locally known as Horse Tooth Stones from a supposed resemblance.

== Culture ==
Orkney folklore has it that a woman known as the "Yesnaby Healer" had the ability to stop bleeding in any person, even over a distance. The Orkney composer Peter Maxwell Davies has immortalised Yesnaby through "Yesnaby Ground", an Interlude for solo piano.

The Archaeology Institute of the University of the Highlands and Islands initiated the Yesnaby Art & Archaeology Research Project

== History ==
During the Second World War an anti-aircraft battery was built on the cliff top at Yesnaby as part of the defences of the Royal Navy base at Scapa Flow. The battery was manned by the Royal Navy and some traces of the wartime buildings remain.

== Photo gallery ==
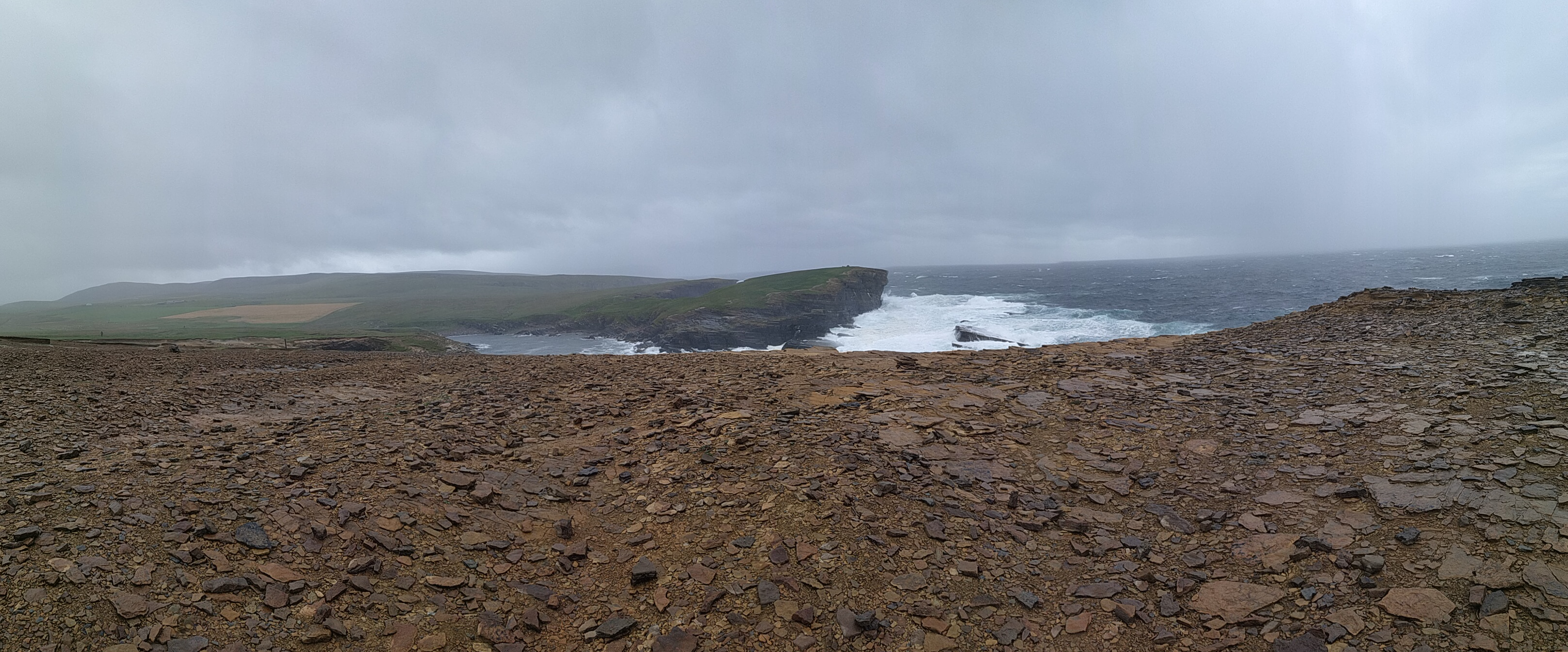
Panorama of Yesnaby

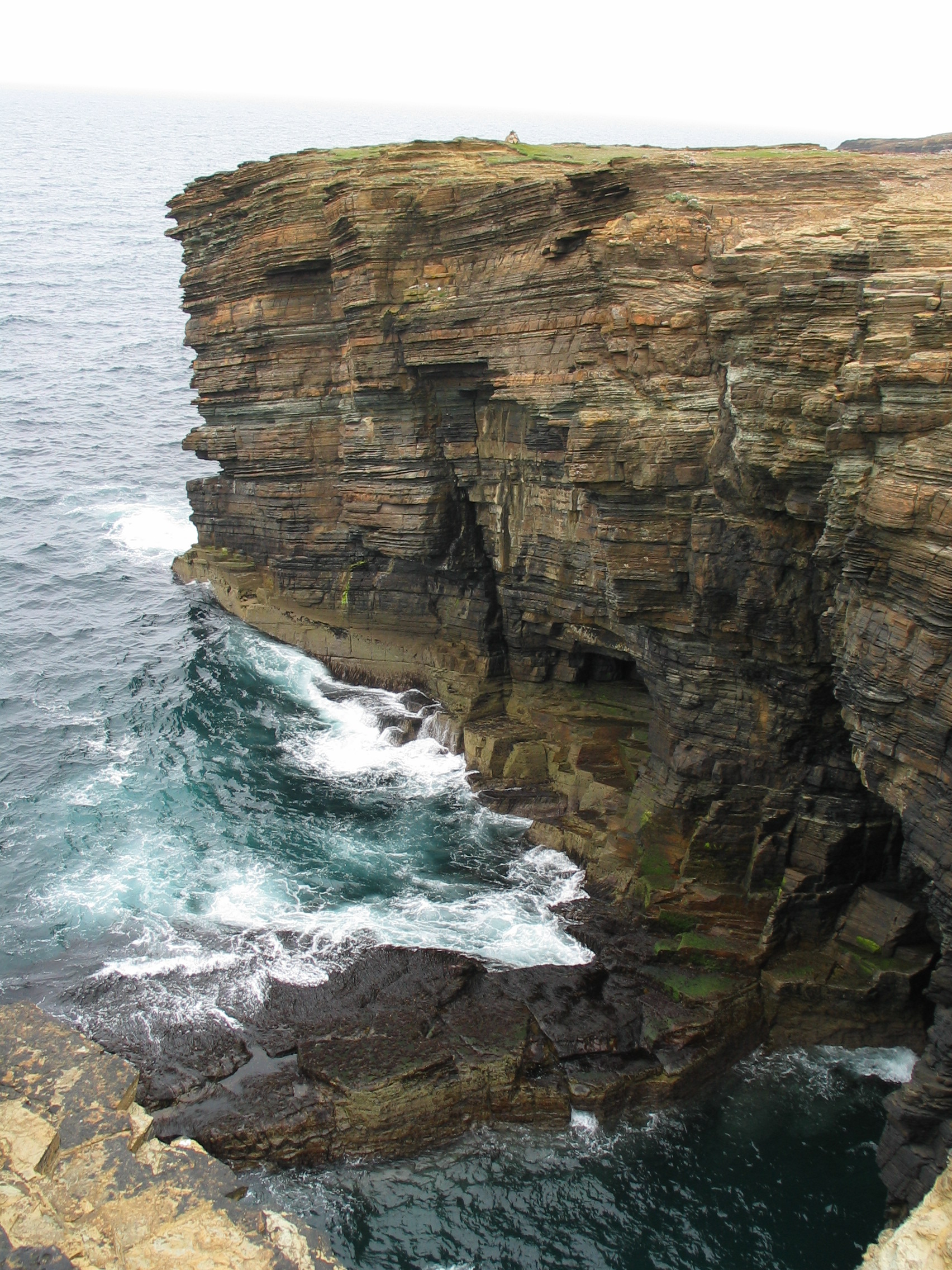
Sea cliffs

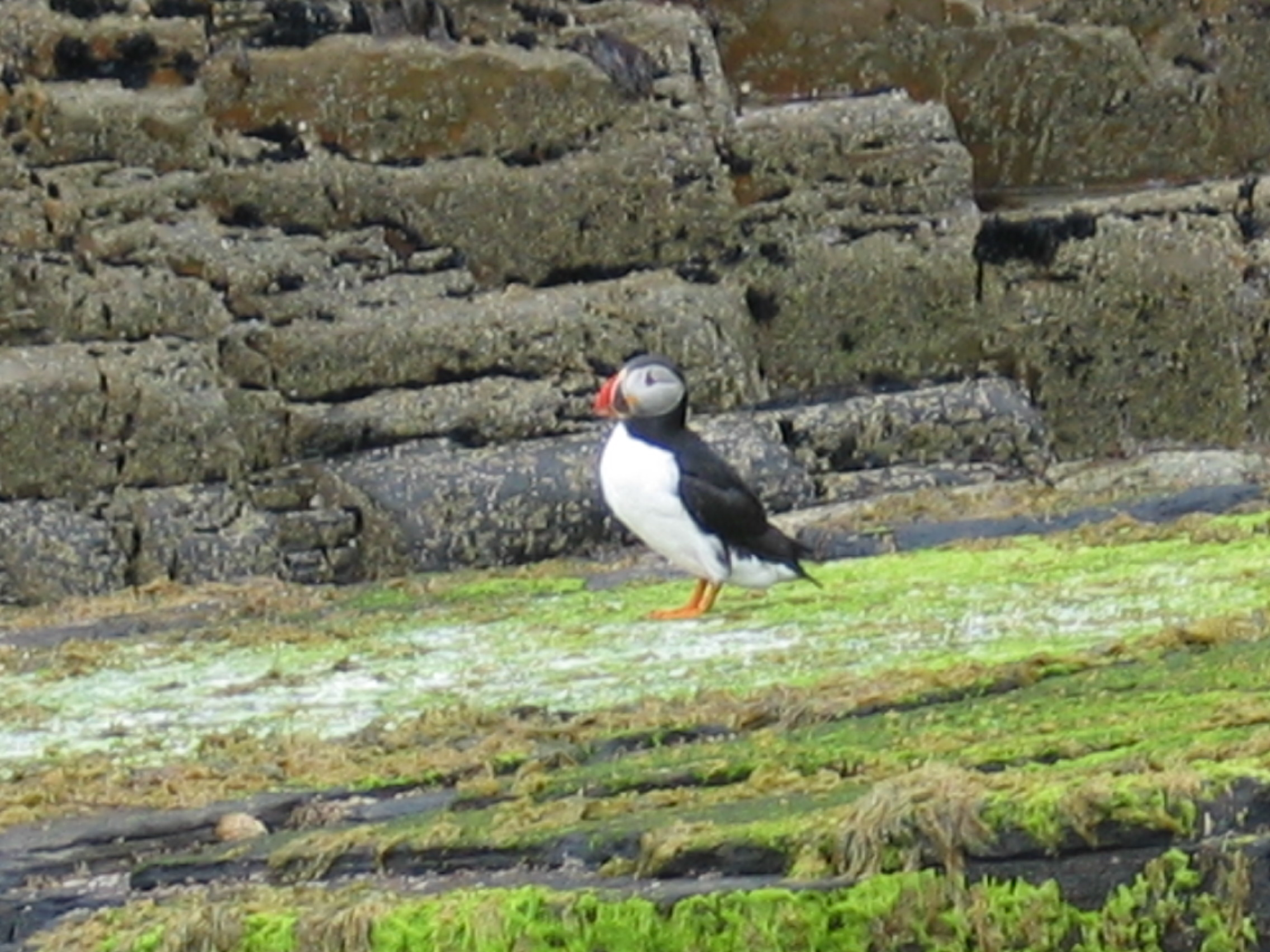
Puffin

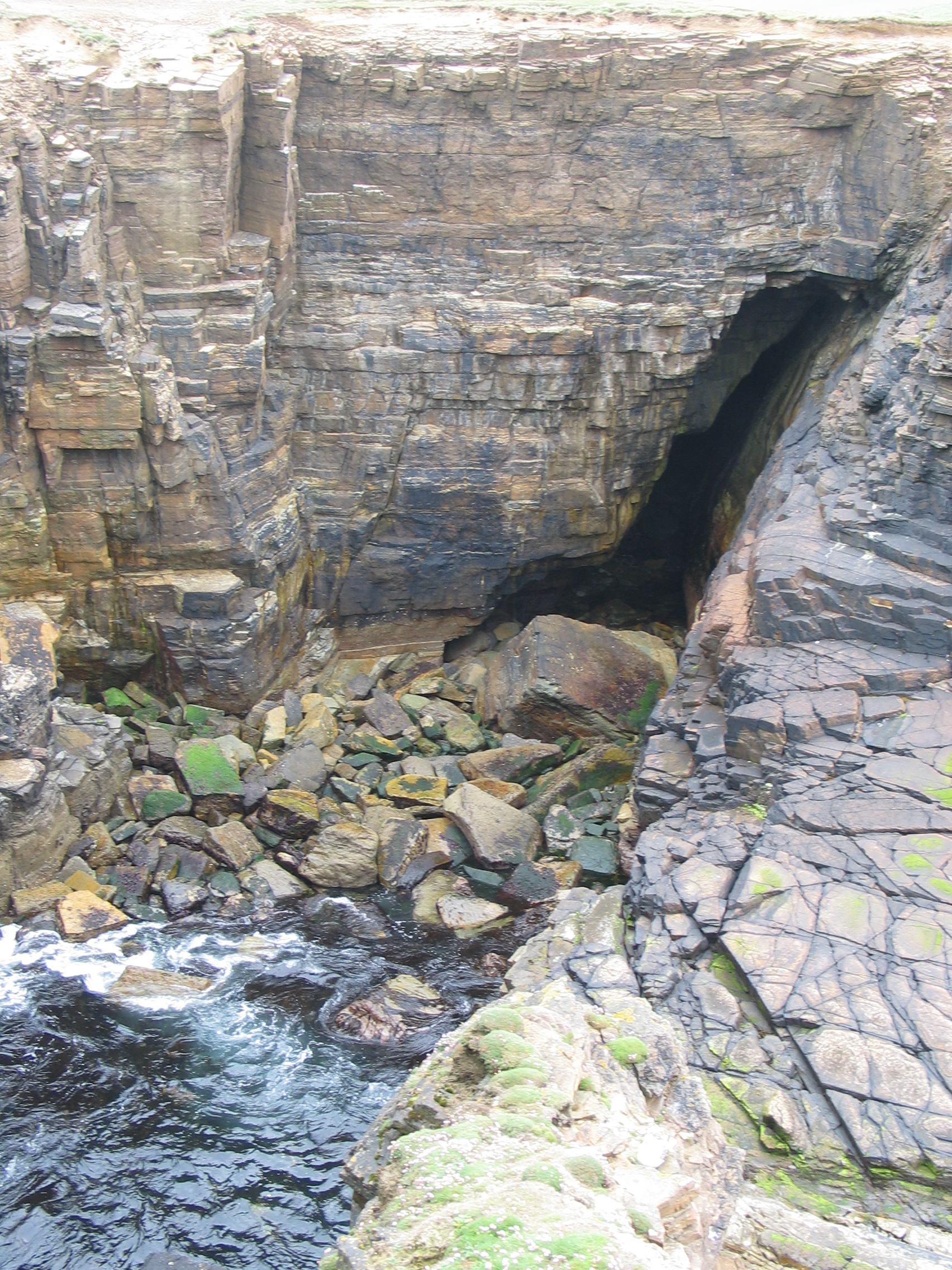
Geo (inlet)

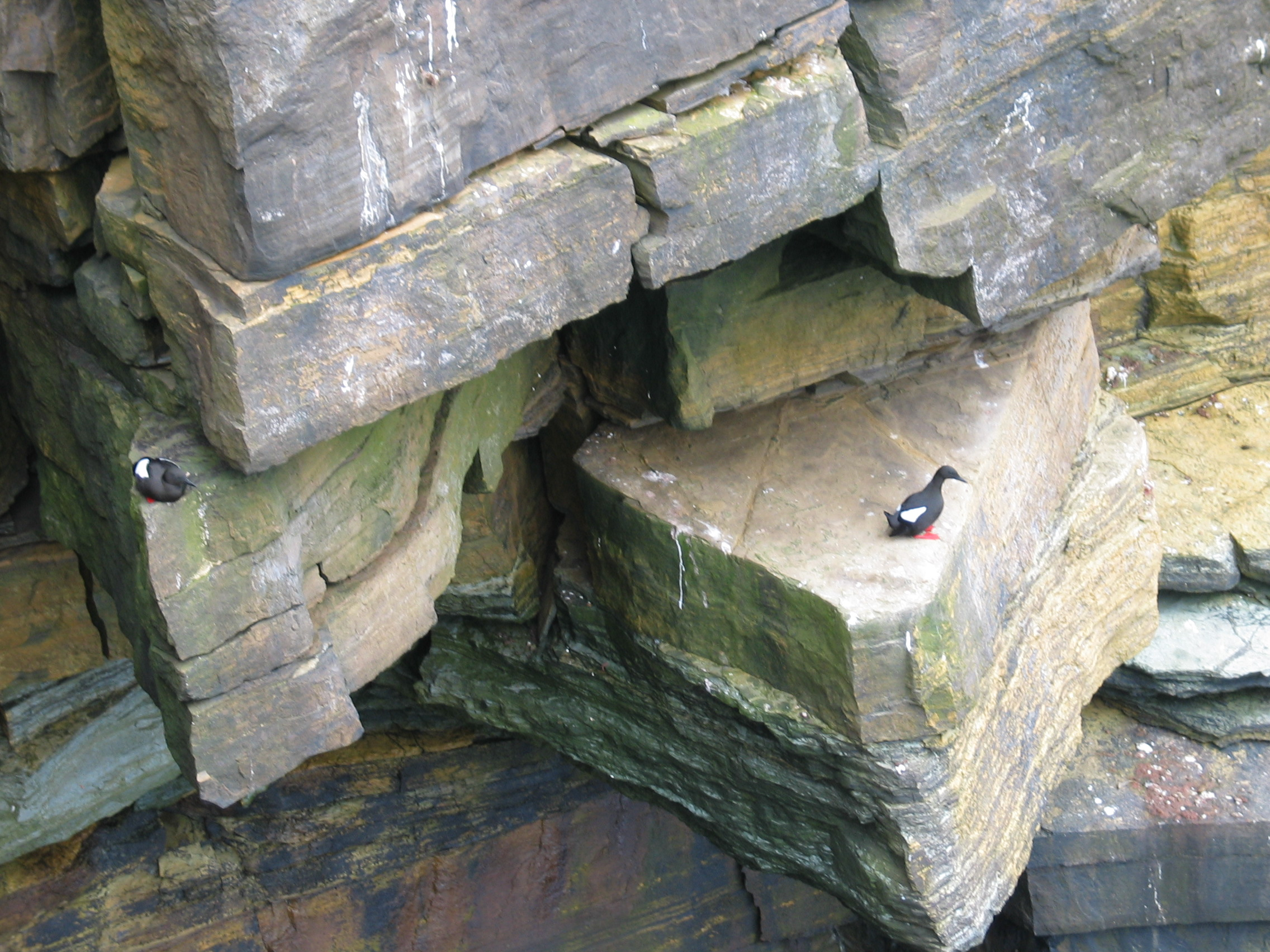
Black Guillemots

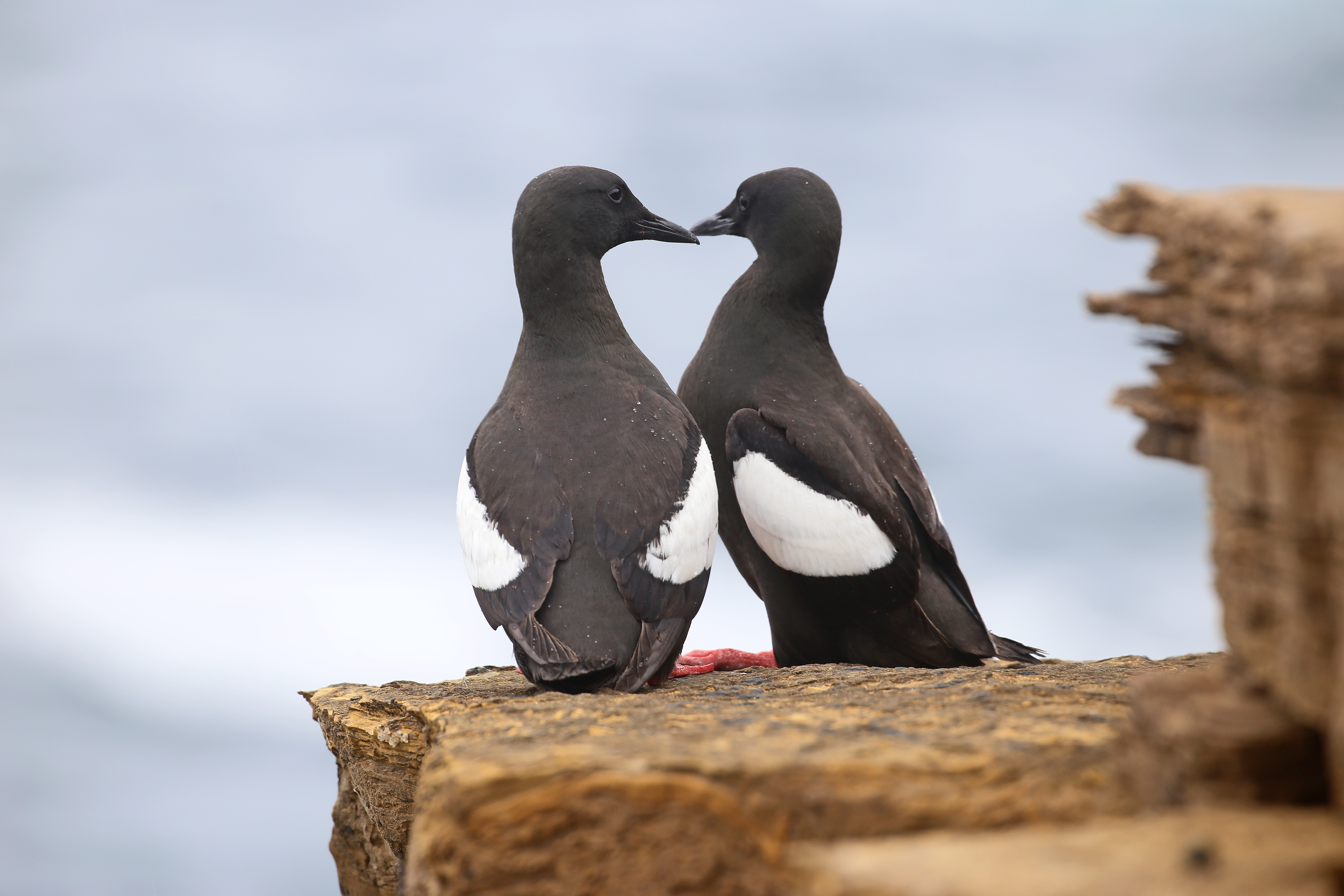
Black Guillemots in summer plumage

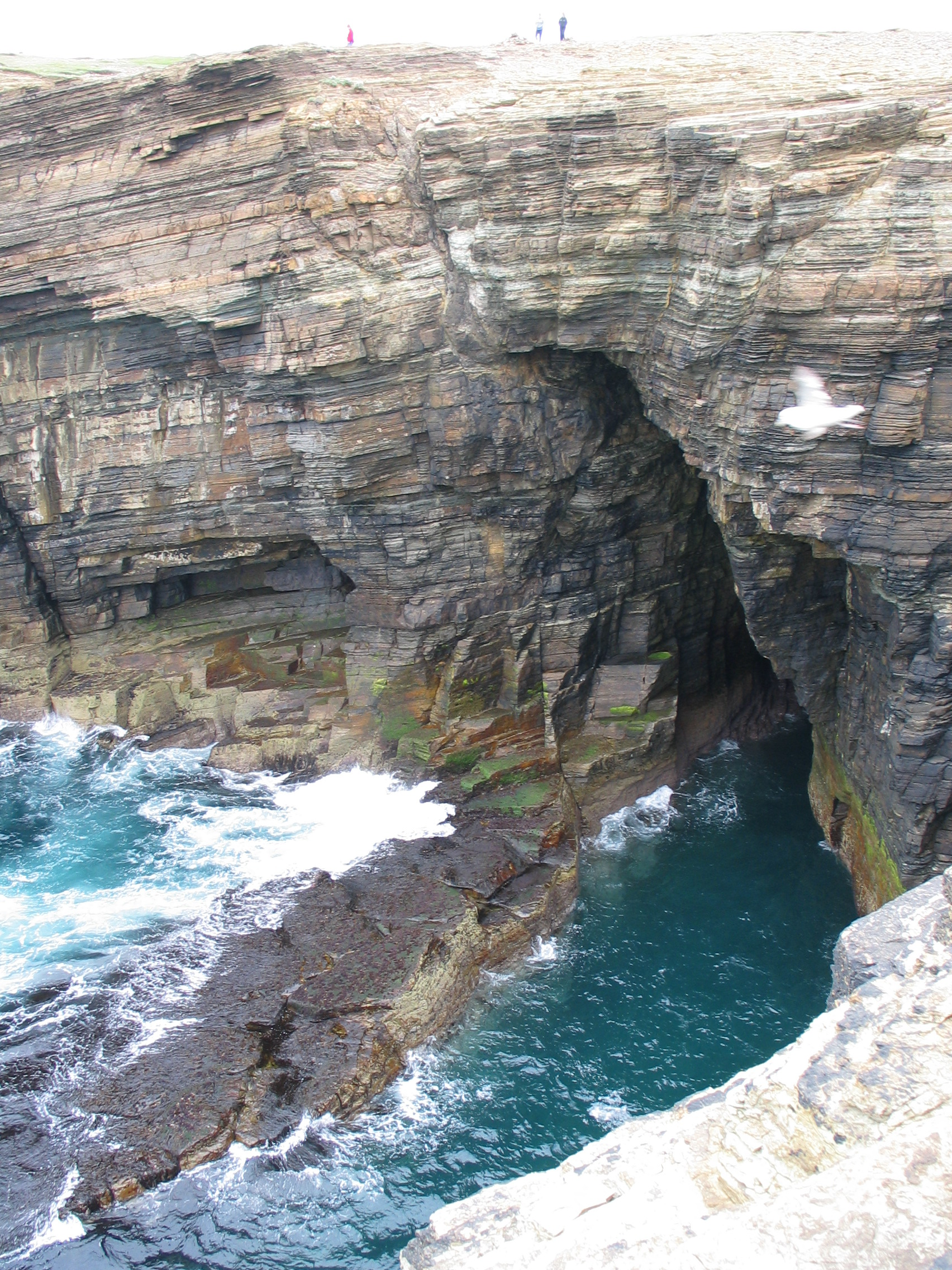
Cliff

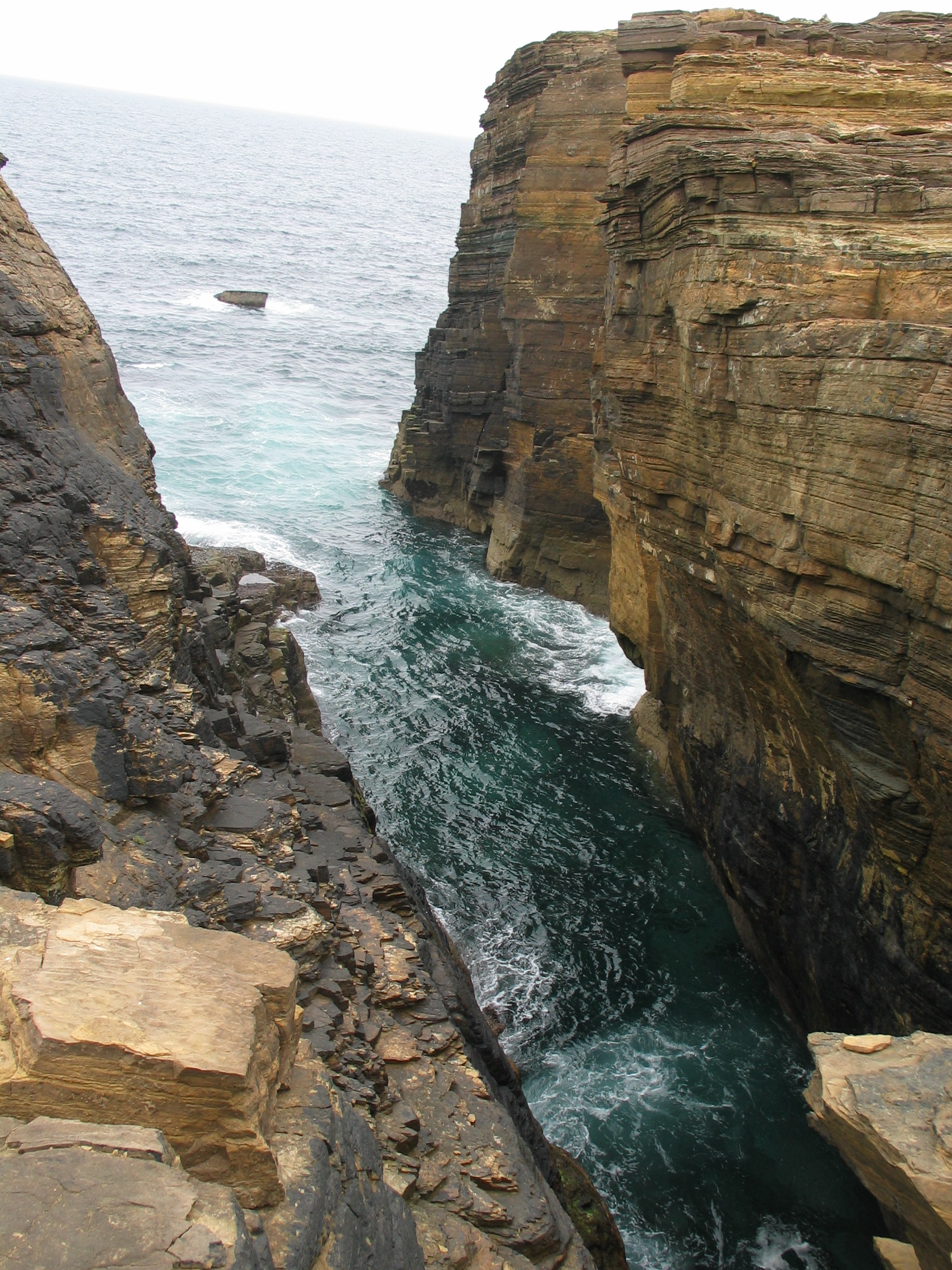
Cliffs

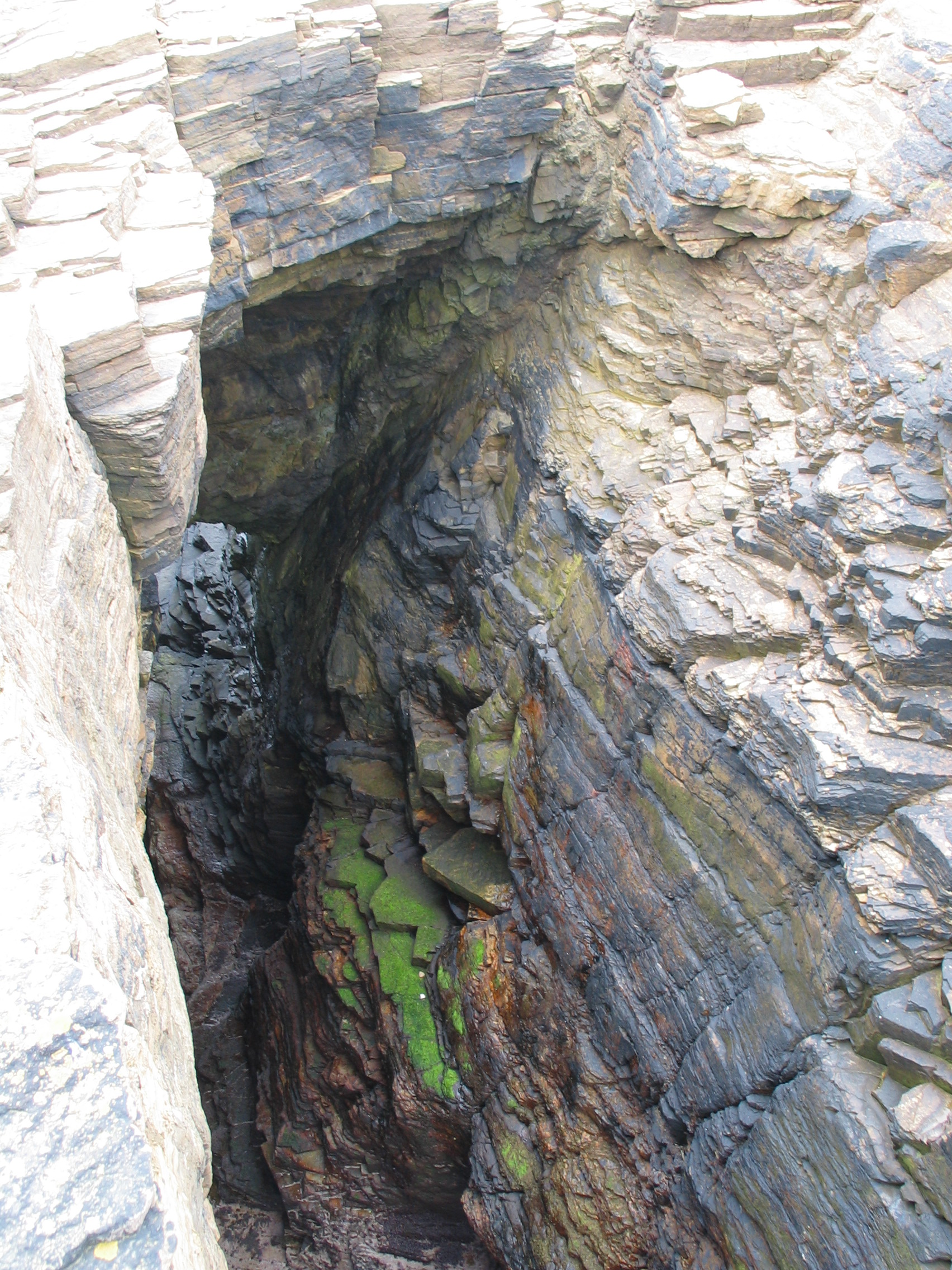
Cliff

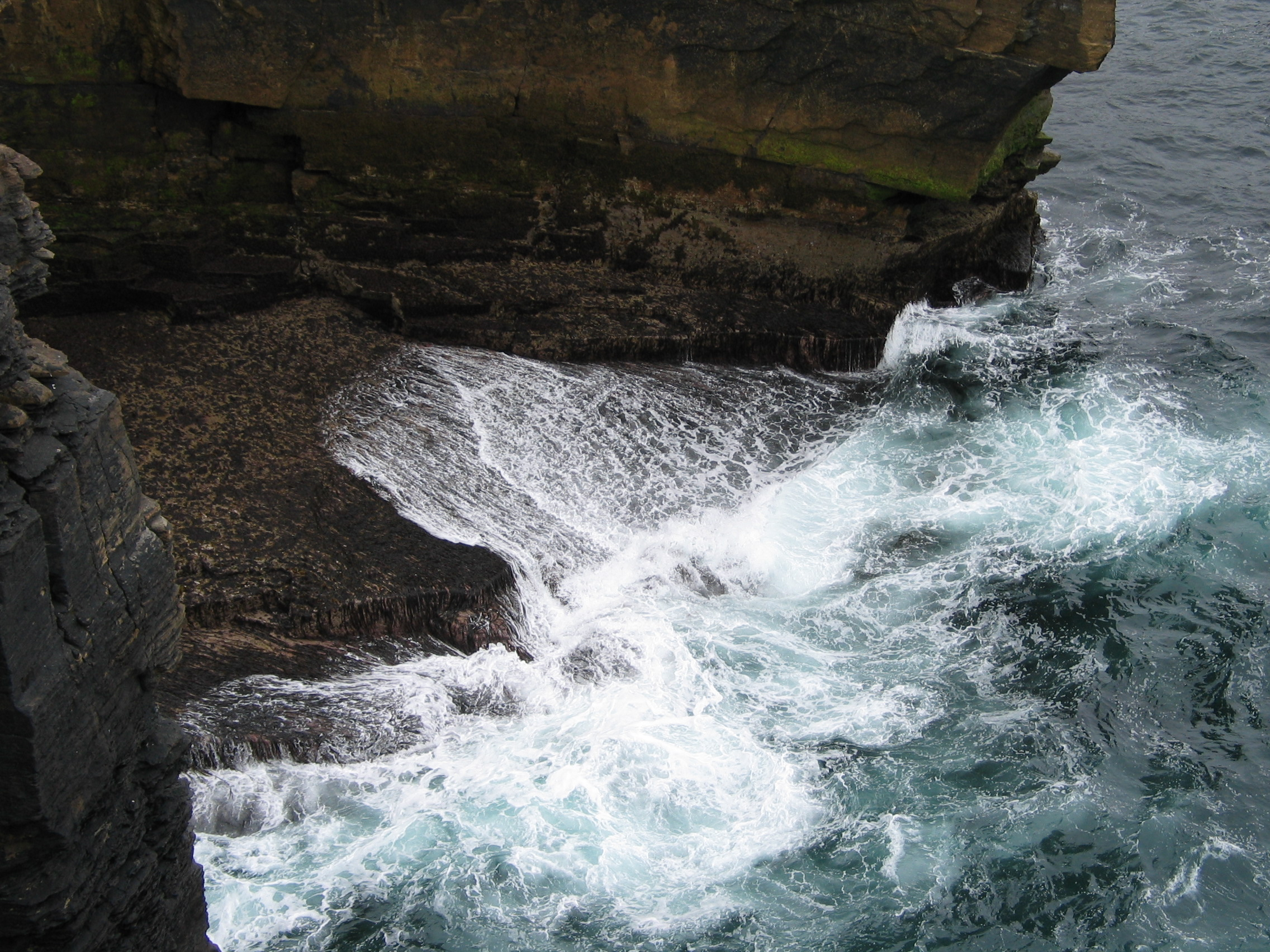
Cliffs
