= Altar Stone (Stonehenge) =

Part of ancient monument in England

Coordinates: 51.17882°N 1.82623°W

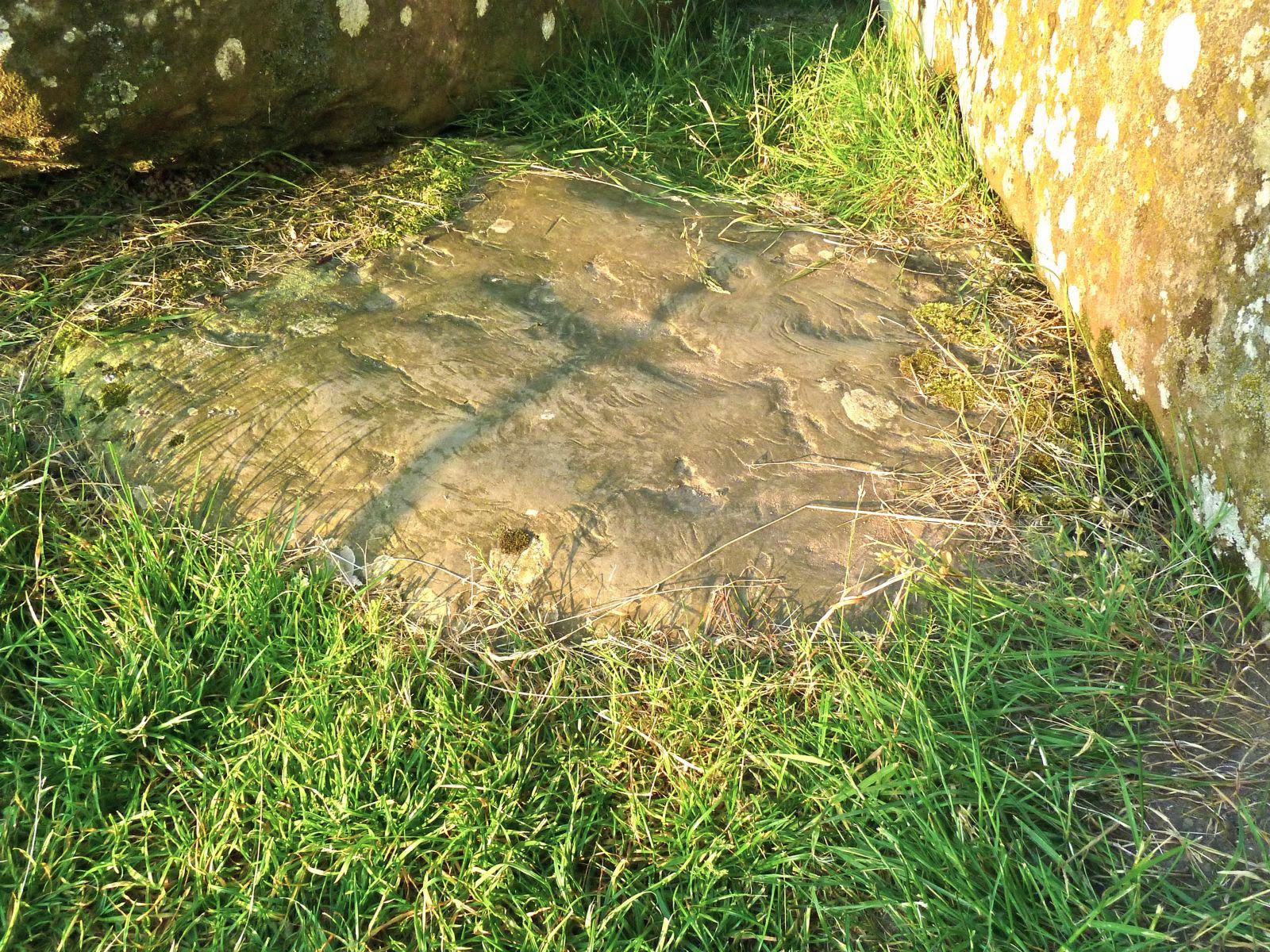
Altar Stone at Stonehenge

The Altar Stone is a recumbent central megalith at Stonehenge in England, dating to Stonehenge phase 3i, around 2600 BCE. It is identified as Stone 80 in scholarly articles.

Its name probably comes from a 1620 comment by Inigo Jones who wrote:

‘... whether it might be an Altar or no I leave to the judgment of others’.

== Composition, origin, and situation ==
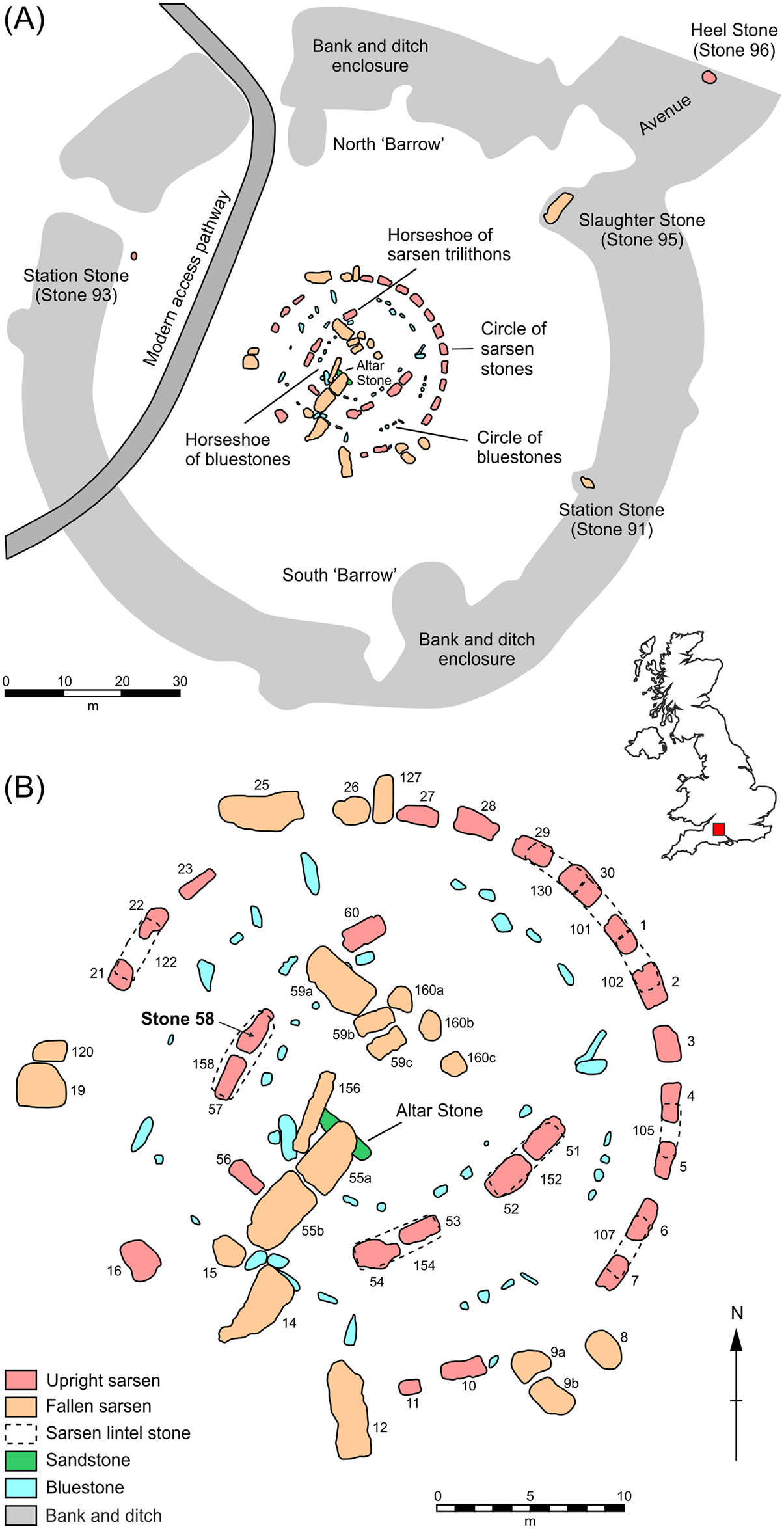
Map of Stonehenge monument and numbered plan of individual stones. The Altar Stone (in green) is located near the center of the monument.

The Altar Stone is made of a purplish-green micaceous sandstone and was thought to have originated from outcrops of the Senni Beds formation of the Old Red Sandstone in Wales, though this has not been fully established. Research published in 2024 claims to show that "the Altar Stone's age fingerprint identifies it as coming from the Orcadian Basin in north-east Scotland".

A 2026 study that compared the stone with sampled outcrops in the Orcadian Basin concluded that a north-east Scottish origin is very unlikely, and that the source remains unknown. The researchers said the stone did not come from southern Britain and may have originated elsewhere in Scotland, northern England or Ireland.

Stone 55 (a sarsen megalith) lies on top of Stone 80 (Altar Stone) perpendicularly, and is thought to have fallen across it. The overall dimensions of the Altar Stone at Stonehenge and its geometry (measuring 4.9 m long by 1 m wide by 0.5 m thick). Some believe that it always was recumbent. It is sometimes classed as a bluestone, because it does not have a local provenance.

Stone 80 was most recently excavated in the 1950s, but no written records of the excavation survive, and there are no samples available for examination that are established as having come from the monolith.
