= Kačák event =

Bioevent or series of events that occurred close to the end of the Eifelian Age

The Kačák event (Czech pronunciation: [ˈkatʃaːk]), also known as the Kačák-otomari event, is a widely recognised bioevent or series of events that occurred close to the end of the Eifelian age of the Middle Devonian period. It involved a global eustatic rise in sea level and ecological turnover. It was named for the Kačák Member of the Srbsko Formation in Bohemia, where it is represented by a black shale interval within a sequence of limestone. In marine environments, this appears as an anoxic event, often forming potential hydrocarbon source rocks such as the Marcellus Shale. Within the Old Red Sandstone continent, it is represented by the Achanarras lake, the deepest and most widespread lake that developed within the Orcadian Basin. The event is associated with significant extinctions, particularly amongst the Ammonoidea.

== Age and duration ==
The event occurred towards the end of the Eifelian age, extending into the earliest part of the Givetian age, in the mid-Devonian period. The duration of the event has been estimated as 700,000 years from the seven cycles involved in the Achanarras interval (each cycle interpreted to represent 100,000 years), but only 200,000 years using geochemical and magnetic resonance data from the Eifelian-Givetian boundary in Morocco.

== Occurrence ==
The Kačák interval was first named from its occurrence in Bohemia as a black shale unit, known as the Kačák Member. This organic rich shale is found within a sequence of shallow water limestones forming the Srbsko Formation of the Prague Basin. The event has also been recognised at Eifel in Germany, Gorodenka (near Omsk, Russia) and in Ontario and New York State in eastern North America, all localities lying on the then continental shelf around the Old Red continent. Further afield at the time of the event, on the continental shelf on the other side of the Rheic Ocean, it has been recognised in Morocco, Cantabria in northern Spain, the Carnic Alps and Graz Paleozoic in Italy and Austria, the Montagne Noire in France and in the Barrandian area of the Czech Republic. The Orcadian Basin of Scotland is the only locality within the continent itself that the event is recognised. Similar events have also been correlated with the Kačák event in China and Australia. In Brazil, the event was registered in the Paraná Basin. In the Horn River Group of Canada, the Kačák interval corresponds to an appearance of anoxic sedimentation and a termination of carbonate platform deposition.

== Geochemistry ==
At the level of the Kačák Event, there is a marked negative excursion in the δ^{13}C level, interpreted to be a result of the anoxic event. This reduction matches closely to an increase in both total organic carbon and a change in the fractionation of carbon between carbonates and organic 'reservoirs'.

== Cause ==
The cause of this event is interpreted to be a period of high temperatures resulting from high insolation levels. This explains both the transgressive event recognised at the margins of the Old Red continent, caused by thermal expansion of the oceans, and the formation of the Achanarras lake within the continent due to the increased intensity of monsoon conditions.

== Extinctions ==
The Kačák event was a period of significant extinctions, although not as marked as those of the subsequent Late Devonian extinctions. Pelagic or nektonic animals (which inhabited open ocean basins) were the most strongly affected. The ancestral ammonoid group, the agoniatitids, suffered heavy losses, while their descendants in the group Tornoceratina diversified at the same time. Conodonts also experienced a turnover, and the Kačák event is equivalent to the Polygnathus ensensis conodont zone. The first part of the extinction is sometimes known as the otomari event, named after Nowakia otomari, a widespread species of dacryconarid which appeared during the event while other dacryconarids died out.

== Economic importance ==
Organic-rich black shales that formed during this anoxic event occur in several countries. In the eastern United States, the Marcellus shale is in the early stages of being exploited for shale gas, with large recoverable reserves predicted. An initial United States Geological Survey assessment from 2002 suggested about 2 TCF of recoverable gas, while in 2009, a study by the United States Department of Energy gave an estimate of 262 TCF.
