= Orcadian Basin =

Sedimentary basin of Devonian age in Scotland, UK

Coordinates: 59.0°N 1.5°W

The Orcadian Basin is a sedimentary basin of Devonian age that formed mainly as a result of extensional tectonics in northeastern Scotland after the end of the Caledonian orogeny. During part of its history, the basin was filled by a lake now known as Lake Orcadie. In that lacustrine environment, a sequence of finely bedded sedimentary rocks was deposited, containing well-preserved fish fossils, with alternating layers of mudstone and coarse siltstone to very fine sandstone. These flagstones split easily along the bedding and have been used as building material for thousands of years. The deposits of the Orcadian Basin form part of the Old Red Sandstone (ORS). The lithostratigraphic terms lower, middle and upper ORS, however, do not necessarily match exactly with sediments of lower, middle and upper Devonian age, as the base of the ORS is now known to be in the Silurian and the top in the Carboniferous.

== Extent ==
The exact extent of the Orcadian Basin is uncertain due to later tectonic effects and burial beneath younger sediments, but it is known to have reached from the south coast of the Moray Firth to the Shetland Islands in the north and from Strathy on the Caithness coast in the west, to the Outer Moray Firth and East Shetland Platform in the east, where it is proven by hydrocarbon exploration wells. Continental sediments of the same age are also known from the Clair oilfield west of the Shetland Islands and have been tentatively identified in the West Orkney Basin. The connection of the Orcadian Basin to the Devonian basins of western Norway and eastern Greenland is not known in any detail. To the south the basin may continue almost as far south as the Highland Boundary Fault, including the half-grabens at Turriff and Rhynie.

== Tectonic setting ==
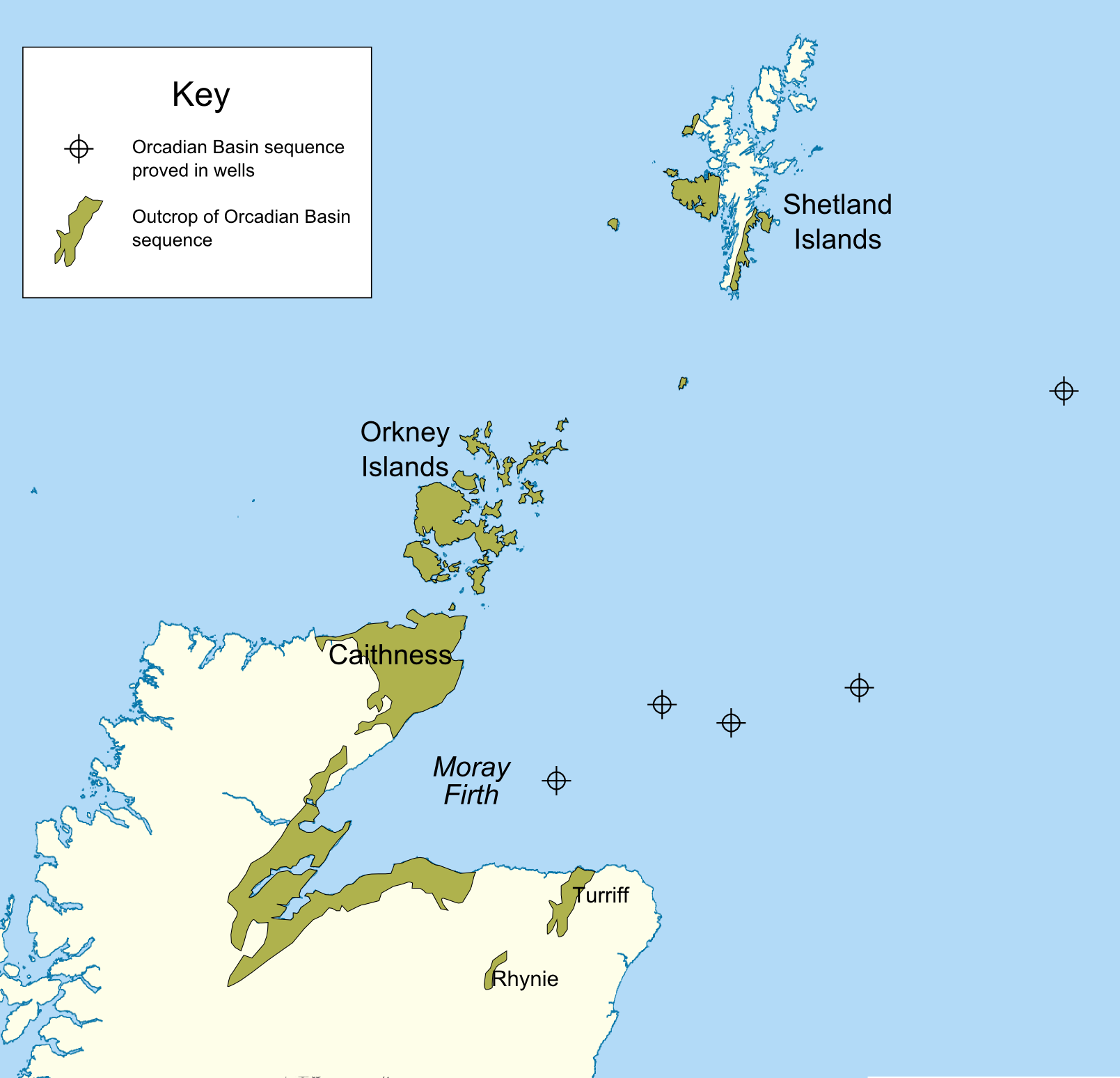
Extent of the Orcadian Basin from outcrop and offshore hydrocarbon exploration wells

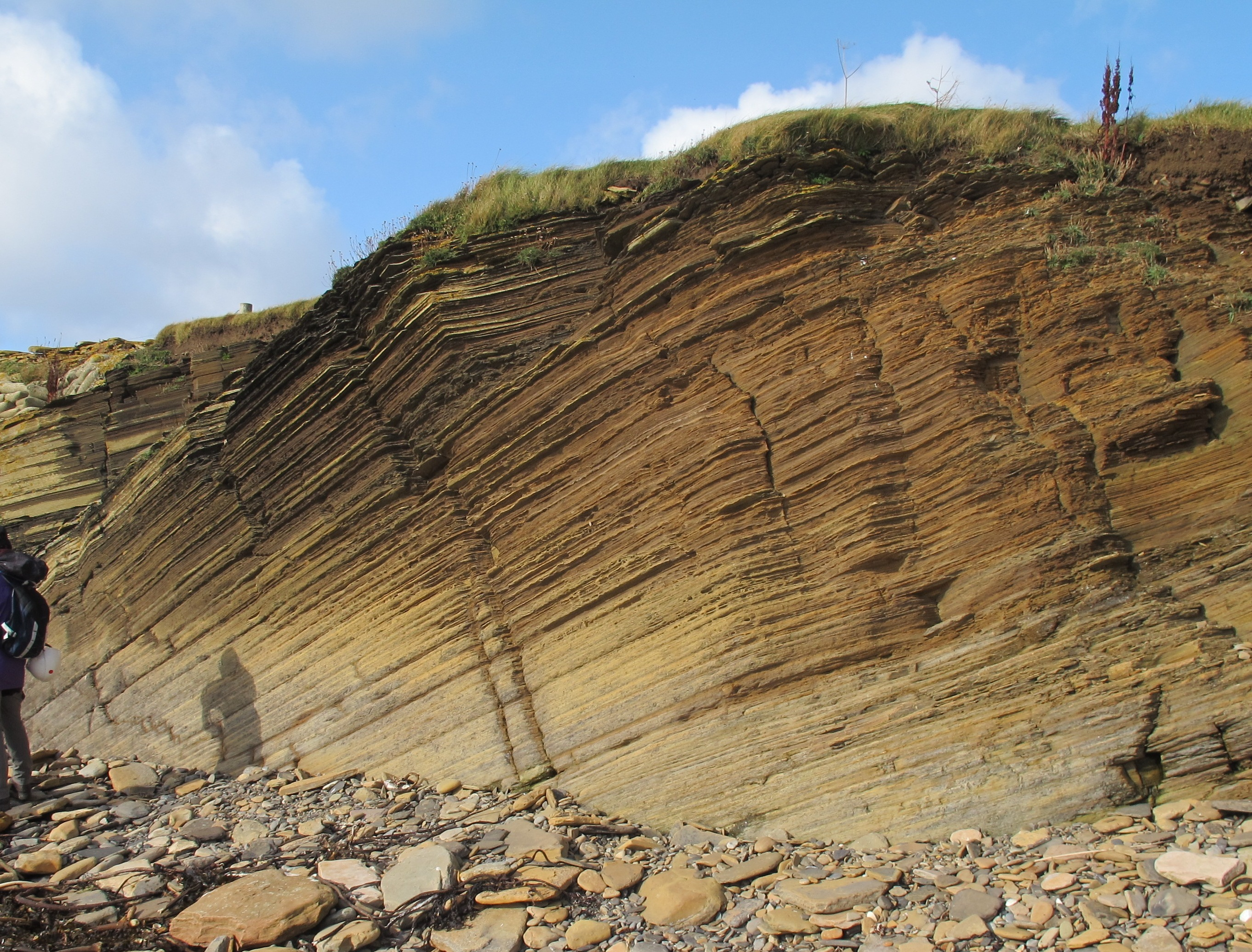
The Sandwick Fish Bed near Stromness, deposited in the deepest, most widespread and longest-lasting lake in the basin

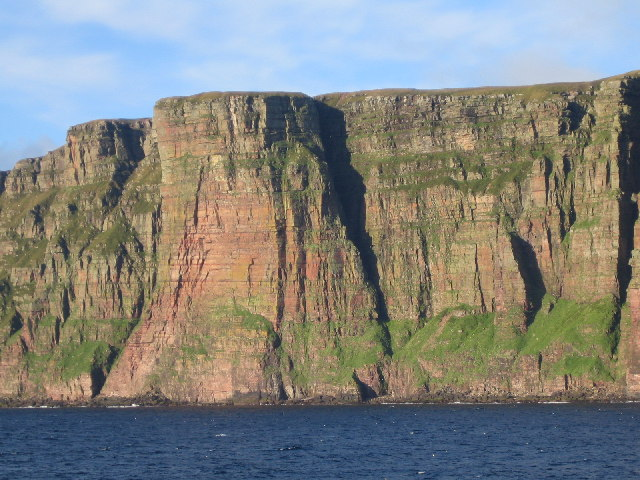
Thick fluvial sandstones of Givetian age exposed in the cliffs on the western coast of Hoy

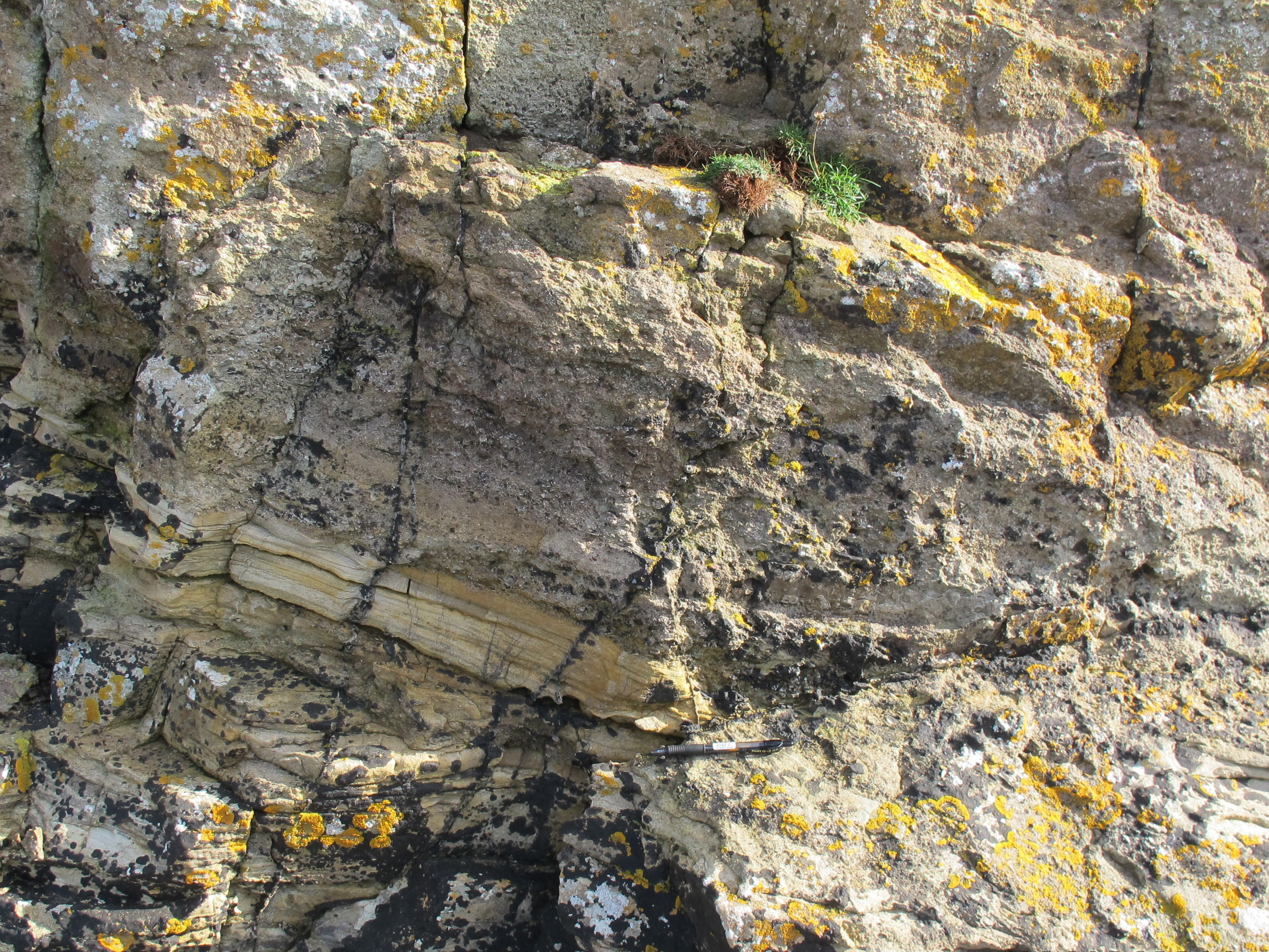
Tuff layer within Eday Sandstone near Houton Head, Mainland, Orkney

In common with the Devonian basins of Norway and East Greenland, the Orcadian Basin lies entirely within the area affected by crustal thickening during the Caledonian orogeny. The recognition of extensional faulting at various scales in these areas at the same time as deposition led to the suggestion that these basins reflect the gravitational collapse of this thickened zone. Other tectonic models have suggested that transtensional sinistral (left lateral) strike-slip movement on the Great Glen Fault, which passes through the centre of the basin, was the main cause of basin formation. The continuity of Middle Devonian facies belts across the trace of the fault zone, after accounting for subsequent reactivation of the Great Glen Fault in a dextral sense, has been used to argue against strike-slip activity during sedimentation. However, the uplift of a block containing late granitic veins within the basement Moine complex in Easter Ross, whose intrusion has been dated as earliest Eifelian, before deposition of the overlying Middle Devonian sediments, is evidence of some continuing activity along this structure into the middle Devonian period.

== Development ==
=== Early Devonian ===
Evidence from onshore in Easter Ross and offshore in the Inner Moray Firth shows that a series of isolated half-grabens were formed at this time filled with a mixture of coarse, often conglomeratic sediments, combined with organic-rich lacustrine shales, such as those exposed at Strathpeffer.

=== Middle Devonian ===
Sedimentation during the middle Devonian covered the full extent of the Orcadian Basin with only local exposed basement highs, such as near Stromness in Orkney. The early part of this period, approximately equivalent to the whole of the Eifelian and early Givetian, saw the development of a large lake, that covered most of the basin at times. Regular variations in its depth and extent, which have been linked to Milankovitch cycles, led to pronounced cyclicity in the sequence. At the deep permanent lake stage in a typical cycle there is normally a laminite, consisting of fine-scale alternations of clastic, carbonate and organic laminae, thought to represent annual varves. As the lake shallows and becomes ephemeral the sequence consists of alternations of silts and fine sandstones often with mudcracks, showing the repeated periods of drying out. The lake development culminated in a single very deep and particularly thick and extensive lake interval, the Achanarras Fish Bed Member. The lake at this time covered an area of at least 50,000 km^{2} with a maximum estimated depth of at least 100 metres. From the fossil fish fauna preserved at one level in this unit, it is known to have been particularly diverse and widespread in its occurrence. This interval is also known as the Sandwick Fish Bed Member in Orkney and a series of other equivalent fish beds in Shetland and on the south side of the Moray Firth. A thick lake interval of similar age is also found in East Greenland. This deep lake interval is dated as late Eifelian and is correlated to the global Kačák Event of marine anoxia, which was associated with significant extinctions. The increase in lake size is explained as the result of an intensification of the monsoon system. This unit splits the flagstone sequence into two parts known regionally as the Lower and Upper Orcadian Flagstone formations.

In mid-Givetian times, the dominant lake environment gave way to mainly fluvial conditions, with the main sediment type changing from flagstones to sandstones. In parts of the basin, the sequence consists almost entirely of sandstones, mainly fluvial in origin, such as the Dunnet Head and Hoy Sandstones. Elsewhere, such as in Orkney in the Eday Group, the sequence shows more variety with major intercalations of marls and flagstones, marking the local return of lacustrine conditions. There is local evidence of marine conditions affecting the basin during one of these periods as shown by the presence of scolecodonts (marine microfossils) in the Eday Marl Formation. This and other later marine incursions have been correlated with global sea level highstands previously recognised from the middle to upper Devonian sequences of New York State, including the Taghanic, Genundewa, Middlesex and Rhinestreet events.

On the Orkney Islands, volcanic rocks are found within the lower part of the Eday Group. These form isolated exposures of varying chemistry, indicating a change in magma source from one with a strong influence from earlier subduction to the alkali basalts more normally associated with extensional tectonics. The Devonian of West Mainland in the Shetland Islands contains more volcanic rocks and the upper middle Devonian sequence there is intruded by the Late Devonian Sandsting Granite.

=== Late Devonian to Early Carboniferous ===
The later history of the Orcadian Basin is only known from offshore well data, as the youngest exposed Devonian known is Late Givetian in age. Well data shows that the depositional style remained similar throughout the Late Devonian and into the Early Carboniferous.

=== Later effects ===
The original form of the Orcadian Basin has been modified by a series of later tectonic events. In the late Carboniferous, the basin was partly inverted during dextral reactivation of the Great Glen Fault system. This caused widespread folding and local small-scale thrust faulting. This was followed in the Permo-Triassic and Jurassic by a series of rift events, during which the Inner and Outer Moray Firth basins were formed. During the Early Cretaceous and again in the Cenozoic, the area was uplifted and eroded. The Great Glen Fault was reactivated after the early Cretaceous, probably in sinistral sense by analogy with the connected Walls Boundary Fault, although the exact timing is unknown.

== Palaeogeography ==
The landscape consisted of rounded hills formed of older metamorphic and igneous rock. The lakes varied in depth and extent from time to time, sometimes lapping against the side of the hills and sometimes retreating so that river flood plains were able to form. Stromatolites can be found at Stromness, indicating that the lake was sometimes saline. Locally scolecodonts (marine microfossils) have been found in the Eday Marl suggesting at least a temporary connection to the sea. The hills were bare of vegetation. The land was not colonised by large plants as it is today, so erosion would therefore be rather rapid and probably seasonal, as would be lake productivity. This is reflected in the deep lake carbonates, which show very fine laminations, interpreted as varves.

== Fossils ==
=== Fauna ===
Fish living of the edge of the lake would float out into the centre, then sink and be preserved in the anoxic conditions prevailing at depth. The Achanarras quarry near Thurso has yielded the most extensive fish fauna and at least one example of all the following groups have been found there.

- placoderms
- acanthodians
- actinopterygians
- porolepiforms
- osteolepiforms
- dipnoans

=== Flora ===
Very few plant remains have been found and none in situ. There is evidence of algal and bacterial activity.

== Cultural and economic importance ==
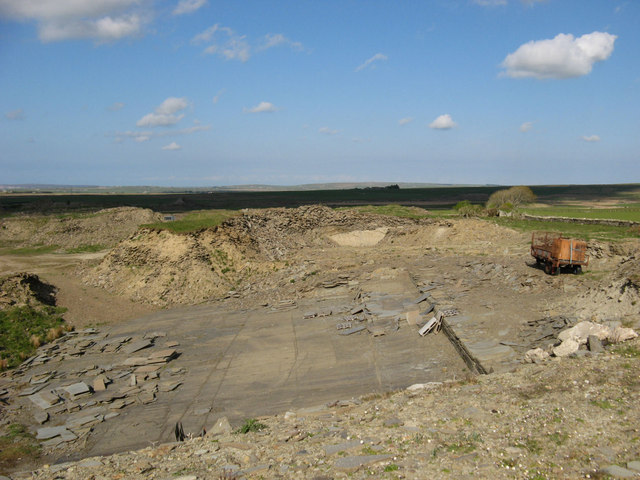
Flagstone quarry near Thurso, Caithness

The flagstone facies of the Middle Devonian lacustrine sequence has provided local building material since at least the Neolithic period. The houses at Skara Brae, the tomb at Maes Howe, the Ring of Brodgar and Standing Stones of Stenness, were all built with flagstone. The quarrying of flagstone became an important industry in the 18th century, particularly in Caithness. Flagstones from Caithness were exported round the world and are still being produced, although in more limited quantities.

The lacustrine sequence has also acted as an oil source rock, being responsible, at least in part, for the oil accumulation in the Beatrice field in the Inner Moray Firth.

=== Altar Stone ===
The Altar Stone in Stonehenge, a 6-tonne shaped sandstone block, originally thought to have come from South Wales, is now thought likely to have been brought from a site in the Orcadian Basin. This is based on the analysis of the age spectra of detrital mineral grains found in samples from the Altar Stone, which match closely with those of samples from the basin.

== See also ==
- List of fossil sites (with link directory)
- Geology of Scotland
- Geology of Orkney
