= Upper Caithness Flagstone Subgroup =

- Stratigraphic range: Eifelian–Givetian
- Type: Subgroup
- Unit of: Caithness Flagstone Group
- Sub-units: Mey Flagstone Formation, Ham-Scarfskerry Flagstone Formation, Spital Flagstone Formation, Latheron Formation
- Underlies: John O'Groats Sandstone Group
- Overlies: Robbery Head Formation
- Thickness: ~1500 m

Location
- Region: Scotland
- Country: United Kingdom

Type section
- Named for: Caithness

The Upper Caithness Flagstone Subgroup is a geological subgroup in Caithness, Scotland. It preserves fossils dating back to the Eifelian and Givetian stages of the Devonian period.

== Stratigraphy ==
It forms the upper part of the Caithness Flagstone Group and overlies the Lower Caithness Flagstone Subgroup. It is the lateral equivalent of the Upper Stromness Flagstone Formation on Orkney. The Achanarras Fish Bed is an important marker within the flagstone succession. It lies either at the base of the subgroup or at the top of the underlying subgroup or forms a separate unit separating the two subgroups.

== See also ==
- List of fossiliferous stratigraphic units in Scotland
