= Eday Group =

Group in Orkney Islands, Scotland

- Stratigraphic range: Givetian (Devonian)
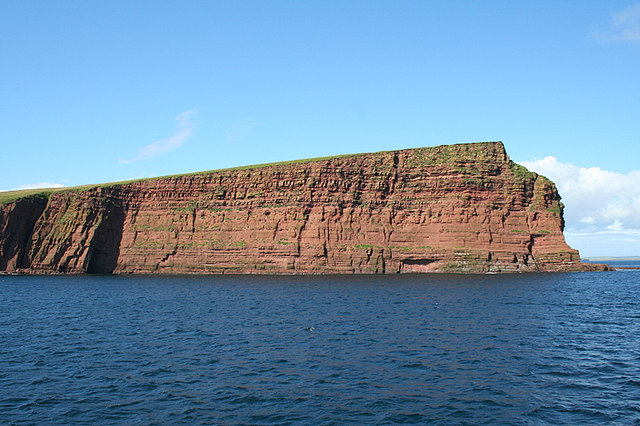
- Red Head at the north end of Eday. The lower and steeper part of the cliff is formed of Middle Eday Sandstone, whereas the upper less steep part is formed of Eday Marl
- Type: Group
- Unit of: Old Red Sandstone Supergroup
- Sub-units: Upper Eday Sandstone Formation, Eday Marl Formation, Middle Eday Sandstone Formation, Eday Flagstone Formation, Lower Eday Sandstone Formation, Hoy Sandstone Formation
- Underlies: not overlain
- Overlies: Caithness Flagstone Group
- Thickness: over 2000 m

Lithology
- Primary: sandstone
- Other: mudstone, siltstone, lava

Location
- Region: Orkney
- Country: Scotland
- Extent: Orkney Islands

Type section
- Named for: Eday

The Eday Group is a Devonian lithostratigraphic group (a sequence of rock strata) in Orkney, northern Scotland. The name is derived from the island of Eday where the strata are exposed in coastal cliffs.

== Outcrops ==
These rocks are exposed throughout Orkney, notably in coastal cliffs of Eday and western Sanday, South Ronaldsay and the Deerness peninsula of Mainland. There are spectacular exposures of the Hoy Sandstone Formation and particularly the Trowie Glen Sandstone Member in the precipitous cliffs of Hoy's west coast.

== Lithology and stratigraphy ==
The Group comprises the Upper Eday Sandstone Formation, Eday Marl Formation, Middle Eday Sandstone Formation, Eday Flagstone Formation, Lower Eday Sandstone Formation and the Hoy Sandstone Formation laid down in the shallow Orcadian Basin during the Givetian stage of the Devonian period. The sediments vary from fluvial to lacustrine to lagoonal. On the island of Hoy, the Hoy Sandstone is a particularly thick formation at whose base is the Hoy Volcanic member.

== See also ==
- List of fossiliferous stratigraphic units in Scotland
