= Yesnaby Sandstone Group =

Geologic group in the Orkney Islands, Scotland

- Stratigraphic range: Givetian (Devonian)
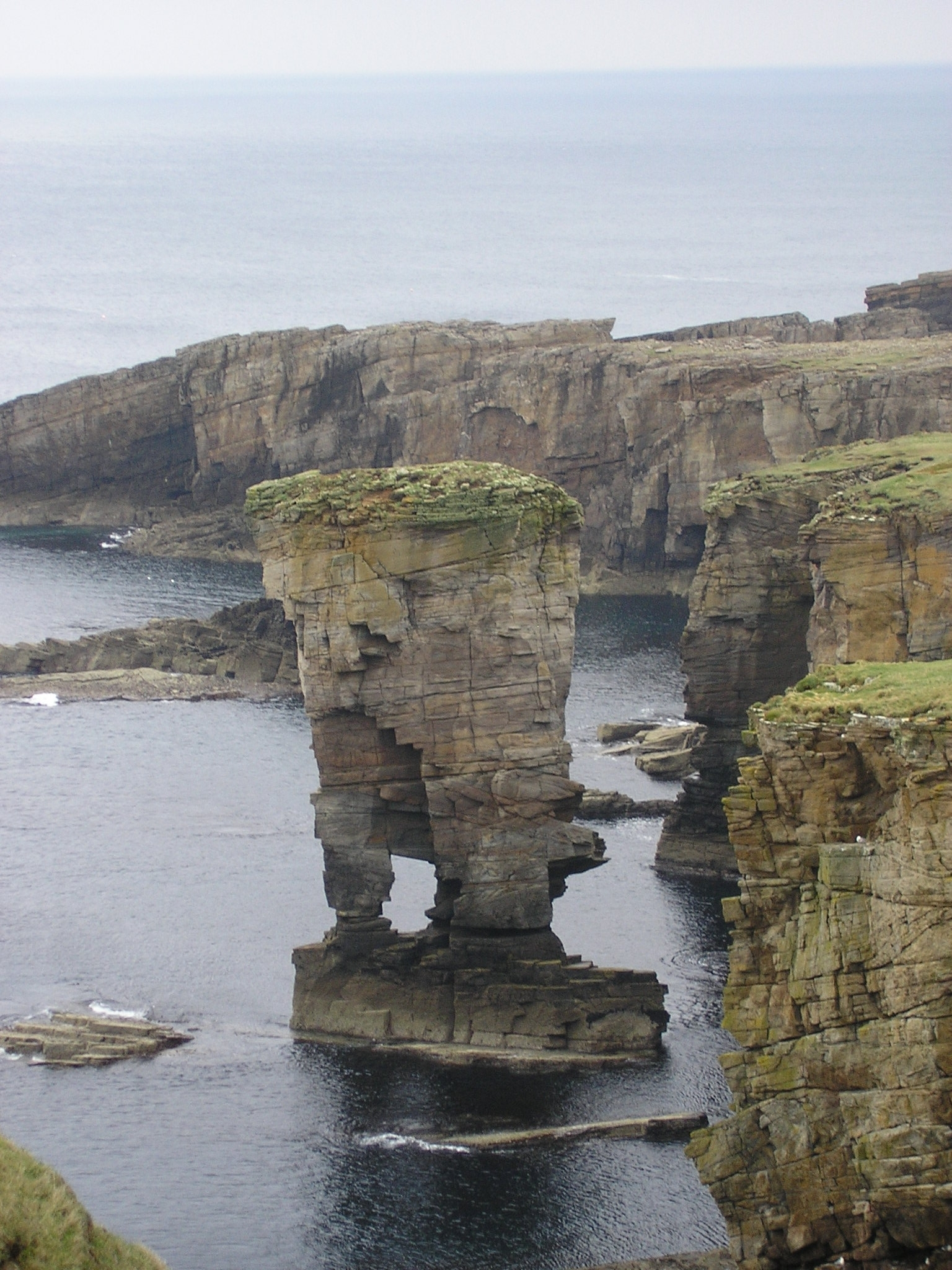
- Dune cross-bedded aeolian Yesnaby Sandstone exposed in the cliffs at Yesnaby and on Yesnaby Castle sea stack
- Type: Group
- Unit of: Old Red Sandstone Supergroup
- Sub-units: Qui Ayre Sandstone, Harra Ebb Sandstone
- Underlies: Caithness Flagstone Group
- Overlies: unconformable on 'basement'

Lithology
- Primary: Sandstone
- Other: Siltstone, conglomerate

Location
- Region: Orkney
- Country: Scotland
- Extent: West coast of Mainland, Orkney

Type section
- Named for: Yesnaby

The Yesnaby Sandstone Group is a Devonian lithostratigraphic group (a sequence of rock strata) in west Mainland Orkney, Scotland. The name is derived from the locality of Yesnaby where the strata are exposed in coastal cliffs.

== Outcrops ==
These strata are only exposed on either side of the Garthna Geo Fault in the Yesnaby area of west Mainland, Orkney.

== Lithology and stratigraphy ==
The Group comprises the Qui Ayre Sandstone and the Harra Ebb Sandstone. The basal beds are talus and alluvial fan facies (bodies of rock with characteristics reflecting particular depositional environments) deposited in a fluvial or lake marginal environment probably during the Emsian Stage of the Devonian Period.
