= Caithness Flagstone Group =

Sequence of rock strata in Scotland

- Stratigraphic range: Eifelian (Devonian)
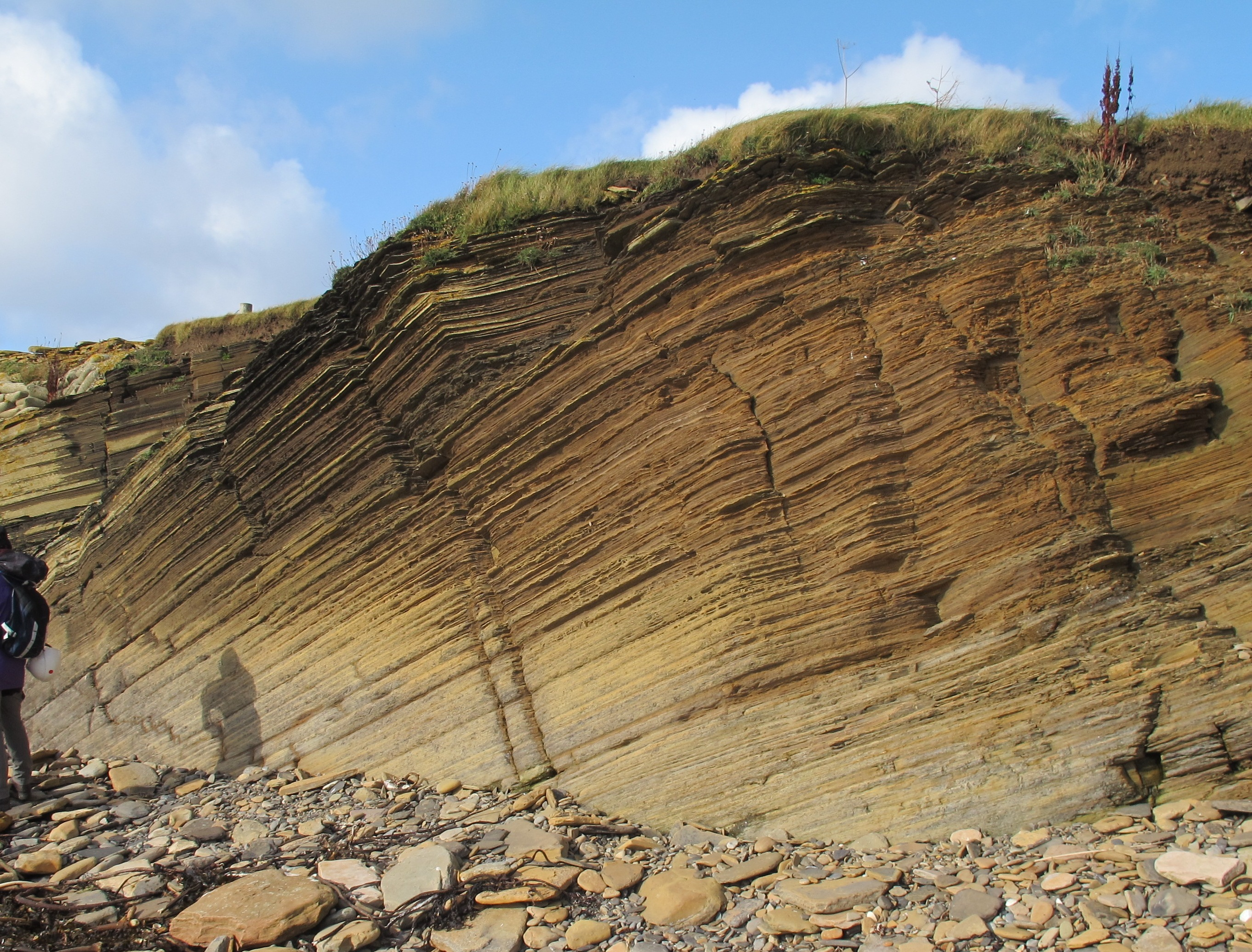
- The Sandwick Fish Bed
- Type: Group
- Unit of: Old Red Sandstone Supergroup
- Sub-units: Upper Caithness Flagstone Subgroup, Lower Caithness Flagstone Subgroup, Upper Stromness Flagstone Formation, Lower Stromness Flagstone Formation
- Underlies: Eday Group, John O'Groats Sandstone Group
- Overlies: Yesnaby Sandstone Group
- Thickness: over 2,000 m (6,600 ft)

Lithology
- Primary: Sandstone
- Other: Mudstone, siltstone

Location
- Region: Orkney, Shetland, Highland
- Country: Scotland
- Extent: Moray Firth to Shetland

Type section
- Named for: Caithness

The Caithness Flagstone Group is a Devonian lithostratigraphic group (a sequence of rock strata) in northern Scotland. The name is derived from the historic county of Caithness, where the strata are well exposed, especially in coastal cliffs.

== Outcrops ==
These rocks are exposed along the Moray Firth, along the eastern side of Sutherland and throughout Caithness, across Orkney and, to a rather lesser extent, in Shetland.

== Lithology and stratigraphy ==
On Orkney the Group comprises the Upper Stromness Flagstone Formation and the Lower Stromness Flagstone Formation laid down in the lacustrine Orcadian Basin during the Eifelian to Givetian stages of the Devonian Period. In Caithness, the group comprises the Upper Caithness Flagstone Subgroup and the Lower Caithness Flagstone Subgroup.

It contains numerous rhythmic sequences of mudstone, limestone, siltstone and sandstone, of which there are 25 and 38 in the constituent lower and upper formations respectively on Orkney. A conglomerate occurs at the base of the lower formation. A notable element is the Sandwick Fish Bed which defines the junction of the two flagstone formations on Orkney and the stratigraphically equivalent Achanarras Fish Bed in Caithness, which separates the two subgroups, from which a diverse range of fish fossils have been recovered. Various groups of researchers and the Geological Survey (BGS) have placed this Fish Bed unit at the base of the upper part or the top of the lower part or as a separate unit, not part of either.
