= Pennsylvania Route 183 =

State highway in Pennsylvania, US

Pennsylvania Route 183

Route information
- Maintained by PennDOT and City of Reading
- Length: 31.681 mi (50.986 km)
- Existed: 1961–present

Major junctions
- South end: US 422 Bus. in Reading
- PA 12 in Reading; US 222 in Bern Township; I-78 / US 22 near Strausstown; PA 419 in Bethel Township; PA 895 in Wayne Township; PA 443 in Wayne Township; PA 901 in Cressona
- North end: PA 61 near Schuylkill Haven

Location
- Country: United States
- State: Pennsylvania
- Counties: Berks, Schuylkill

Highway system
- Pennsylvania State Route System; Interstate; US; State; Scenic; Legislative
← PA 182	→ PA 184
← I-83	PA 83	→ I-84

Pennsylvania Route 183 (PA 183) is a 31.7-mile-long (51.0 km) route that runs north to south in southeastern Pennsylvania. The southern terminus is at U.S. Route 422 Business (US 422 Bus.) in Reading in Berks County. Its northern terminus is at PA 61 near Schuylkill Haven in Schuylkill County. The road passes through developed areas near Reading before continuing north through rural areas, crossing from Berks County into Schuylkill County at Blue Mountain. PA 183 serves the communities of Bernville, Strausstown, and Cressona.

Much of what is now PA 183 was originally designated as part of Pennsylvania Route 83 (PA 83) in 1927, a route that ran from US 30/PA 1 in Devon northwest to US 120/PA 42 (now PA 61) near Schuylkill Haven. PA 83 was realigned to a more direct route in northern Berks County by 1960, bypassing a jog to the west through Rehrersburg. In 1961, PA 83 was renumbered to PA 183 to avoid duplication with Interstate 83 (I-83) and the southern terminus was cut back to PA 23 near Phoenixville. The southern terminus was truncated to its current location in Reading by 1966. The former alignment between Devon and Reading became a part of other state routes, with some portions becoming unnumbered.

== Route description ==
=== Berks County ===
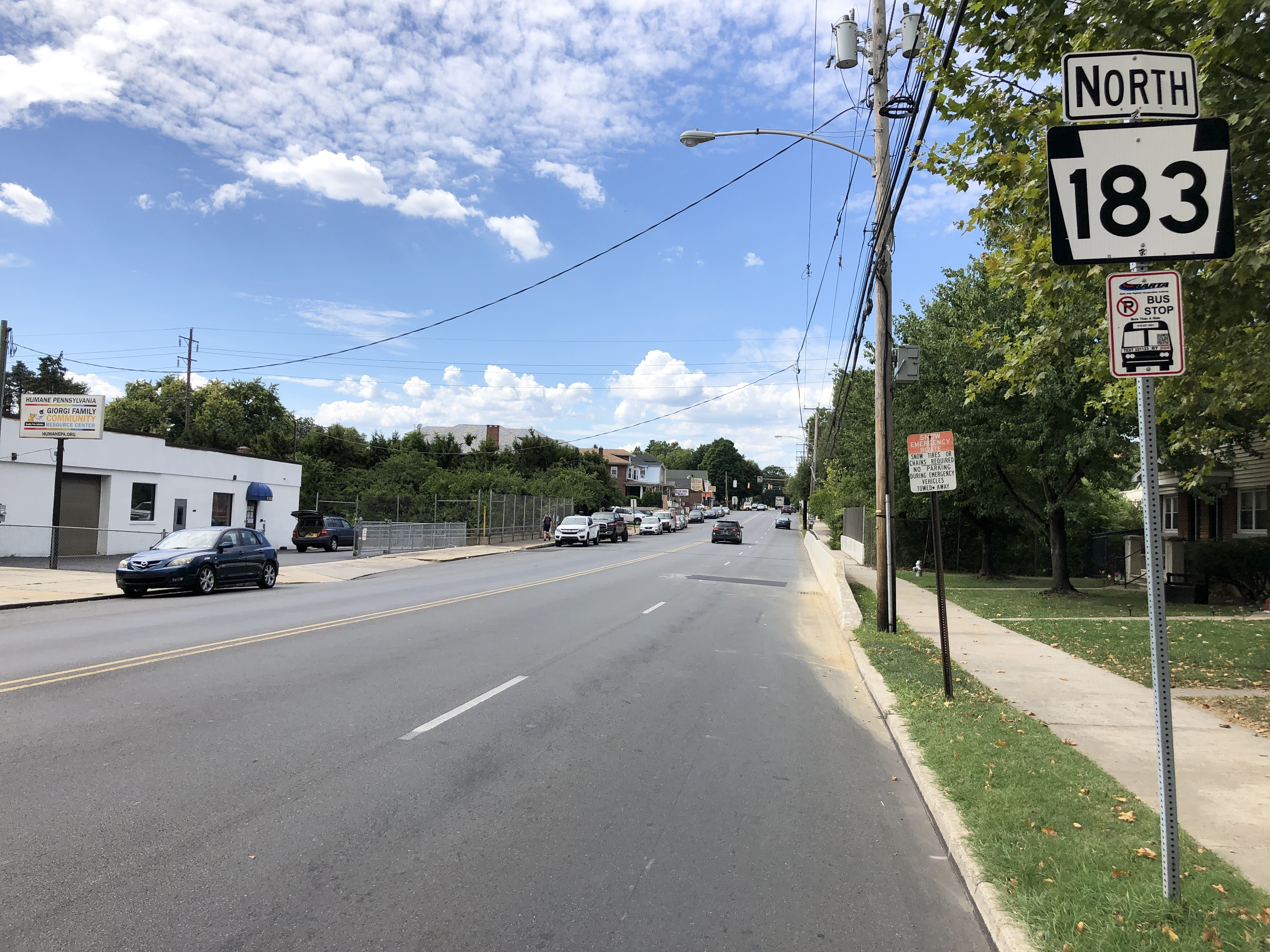
PA 183 northbound at the PA 12 interchange in Reading

PA 183 begins at US 422 Bus. in the downtown area of the city of Reading in Berks County. The northbound direction begins at the intersection of North 3rd Street and Washington Street and heads west concurrent with westbound US 422 Bus. on one-way Washington Street, carrying three lanes of traffic. Southbound PA 183 ends at the intersection of 2nd Street and Penn Street, following US 422 Bus. westbound south on North 2nd Street, a one-way street with four lanes of traffic. Past the concurrency with US 422 Bus., PA 183 heads west on the two-lane undivided Washington Street, passing to the north of Reading Area Community College. The route passes through commercial areas before turning north onto Front Street and entering residential areas. At the intersection with Walnut Street, PA 183 splits into a one-way pair that carries two lanes in each direction, with the northbound direction remaining along Front Street and the southbound direction following Schuylkill Avenue. Front Street heads north while Schuylkill Avenue angles northwest, with the one-way pair continuing through areas of homes and passing over Norfolk Southern's Harrisburg Line #2. Schuylkill Avenue becomes a two-way, two-lane road at the Green Street intersection. Northbound PA 183 turns west on two-way, two-lane Windsor Street to rejoin southbound PA 183 on four-lane undivided Schuylkill Avenue. Along this one-way pair, northbound PA 183 is city-maintained. The highway heads northwest, passing over Norfolk Southern's Spruce Street Industrial Track and the Schuylkill River on a bridge that also carries the Schuylkill River Trail.

The roadway passes commercial establishments before coming to a bridge over Norfolk Southern's Reading Line, at which point it enters residential areas. PA 183 comes to an interchange with the PA 12 freeway (Warren Street Bypass), with local streets providing access to PA 12 at right-in/right-out ramps. Here, the roadway narrows to two lanes. A short distance later, the route enters Bern Township and becomes Bernville Road, passing through a golf course before heading past a mix of homes and businesses in Greenfield Manor. The road passes to the south of Reading Regional Airport, intersecting Wellness Way at a roundabout. The route gains a center left-turn lane before heading past industrial parks and to the northwest of Penn State Health St. Joseph hospital. PA 183 widens into a four-lane divided highway as it comes to an interchange with the US 222 freeway.

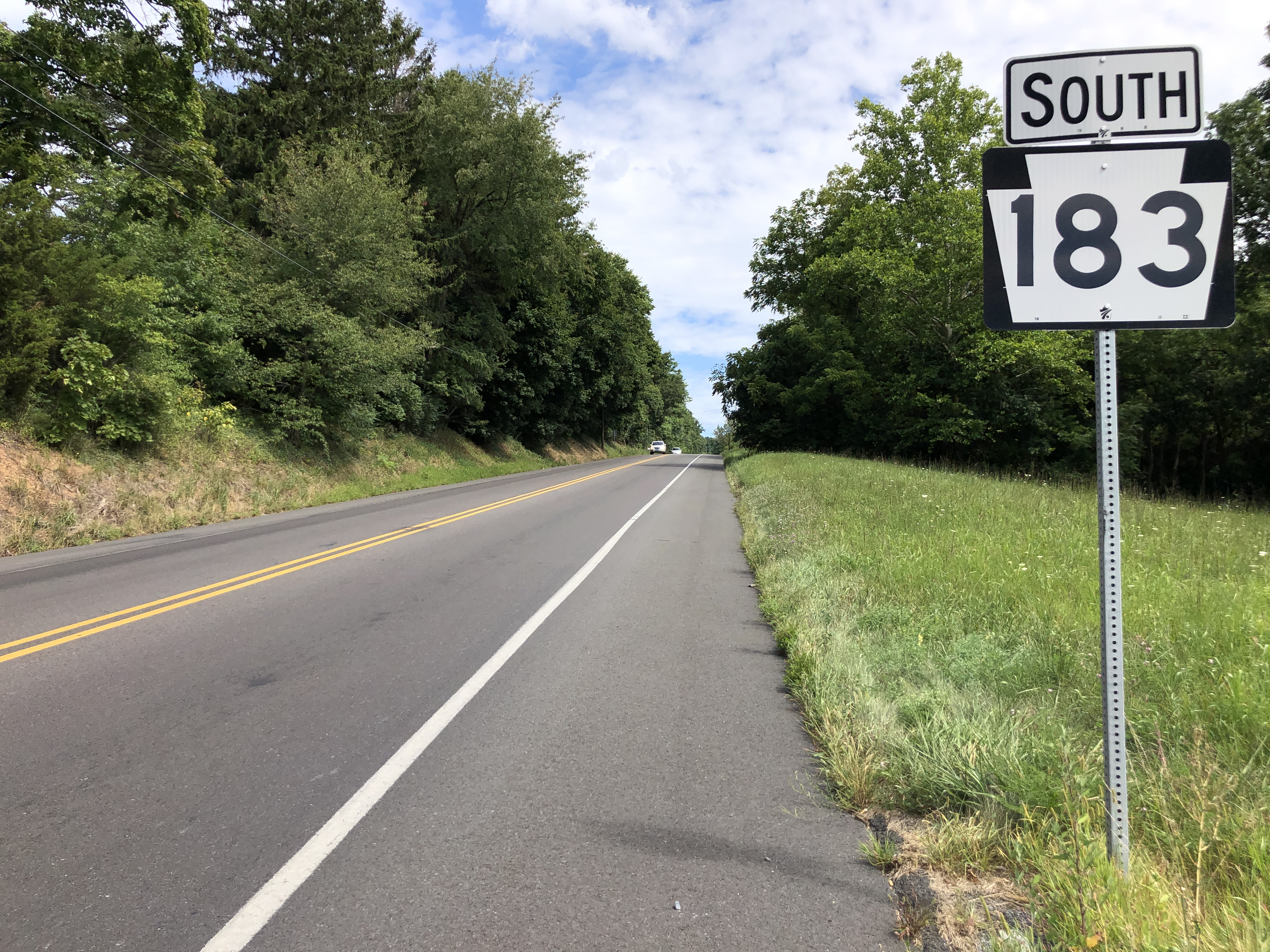
PA 183 southbound in Bern Township

Past the US 222 interchange, the route narrows back into a two-lane undivided road and passes businesses and homes in Leinbachs. Farther northwest, the roadway heads into a mix of farmland and woodland with development. PA 183 heads west and crosses into Penn Township, continuing through more rural areas with some homes. The route passes through Pleasant Valley and heads to the north of Blue Marsh Lake along the Tulpehocken Creek, curving to the northwest. The road continues through wooded areas and fields with some residences as it continues along the northeastern side of the lake. Past Blue Marsh Lake, PA 183 enters the borough of Bernville and passes to the west of residential and commercial development in the town. The road leaves Bernville, at which point it briefly passes through Jefferson Township and Penn Township again before crossing Northkill Creek back into Jefferson Township. The route passes through agricultural areas with some trees and development, curving to the north.

PA 183 enters Upper Tulpehocken Township and heads northwest again through more rural areas of farms and woods as an unnamed road. Farther northwest, the roadway passes northeast of Strausstown, at which point it crosses Old Route 22. Past this intersection, the route comes to an interchange with I-78/US 22. Past this interchange, PA 183 passes through more areas of farmland and development before curving west into forested areas and crossing Little Swatara Creek into Bethel Township, where it comes to an intersection with the northern terminus of PA 419. Following this, the road heads north and ascends Blue Mountain.

=== Schuylkill County ===
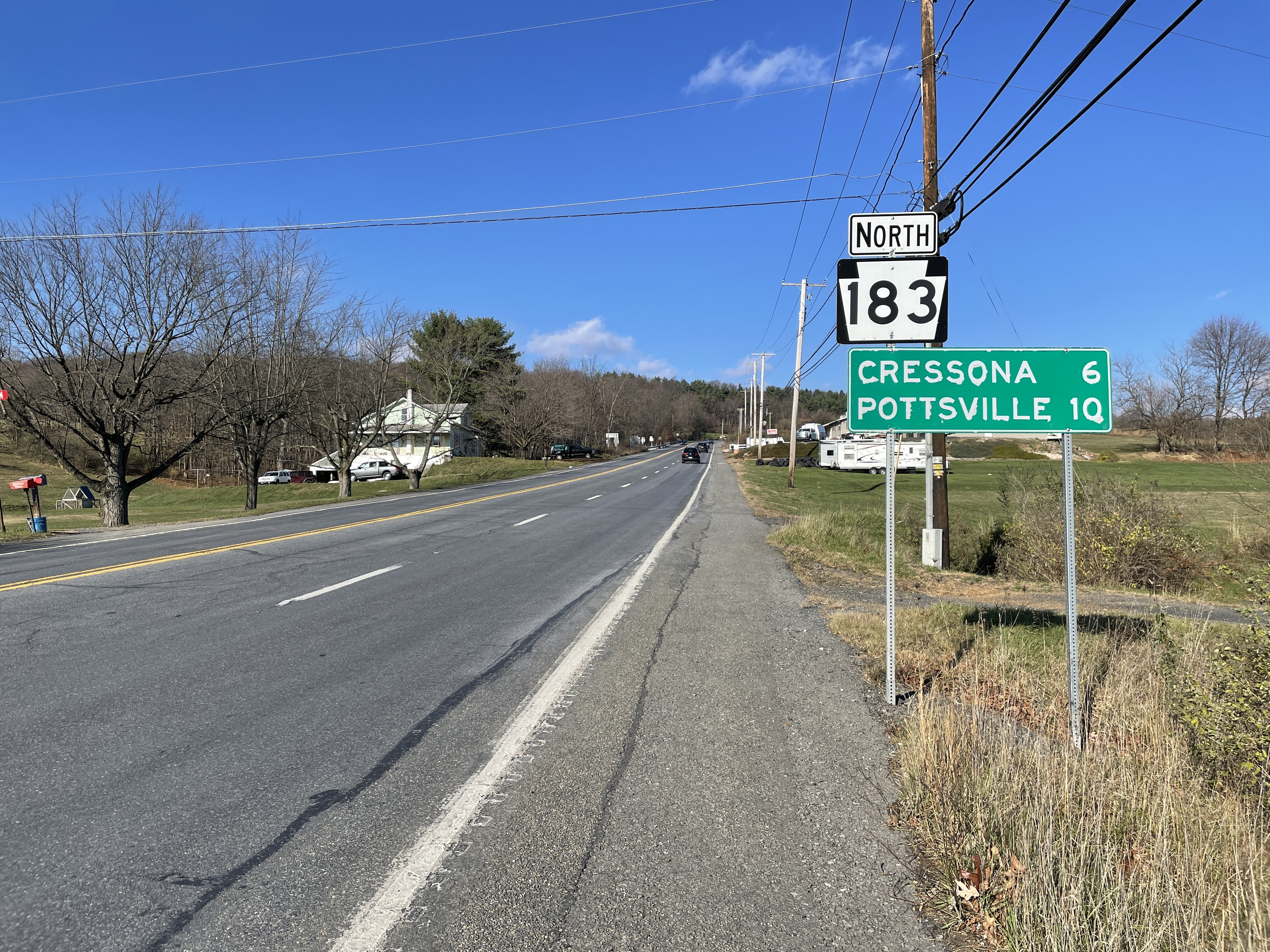
PA 183 northbound past PA 895 in Wayne Township

At the summit of Blue Mountain, PA 183 widens into a four-lane divided highway, crossing the Appalachian Trail and entering Wayne Township in Schuylkill County. The route descends the mountain and becomes a three-lane undivided road with two southbound lanes and one northbound lane. The road narrows to two lanes and continues north through wooded areas with some farm fields and residences, coming to an intersection with PA 895 in Summit Station. The route heads through more rural areas with some homes, gaining a second northbound lane as it climbs a hill. PA 183 becomes a four-lane divided highway briefly before it descends the hill as a three-lane undivided road with one northbound lane and two southbound lanes. The road narrows to two lanes and passes through Reedsville. PA 183 gains a second southbound lane before it comes to a junction with PA 443 and heads northeast through more farms, woods, and homes as a three-lane road with two northbound lanes and one southbound lane. The route narrows back to two lanes before it crosses into North Manheim Township and becomes Chestnut Street, where it curves to the east. The road passes through more rural areas, becoming the border between the borough of Cressona to the north and North Manheim Township to the south before fully entering Cressona.

At this point, PA 183 heads into residential areas before crossing under a bridge carrying a Reading Blue Mountain and Northern Railroad line. A short distance before passing under the railroad, PA 183 Truck splits to the north to bypass the low-clearance underpass. Past the bridge, the route curves north and becomes Sillyman Street, passing commercial establishments before heading past homes. PA 183 turns east onto Pottsville Street, with PA 901 (west) and PA 183 Truck (south) continuing north on Sillyman Street. The route crosses the West Branch Schuylkill River and curves northeast, continuing past more residences before heading east and crossing a Reading Blue Mountain and Northern Railroad line at-grade. At this point, PA 183 heads back into North Manheim Township, where it passes businesses and crosses the Schuylkill River and ending at intersection with PA 61 near the borough of Schuylkill Haven.

In 2015, PA 183 had an annual average daily traffic count ranging from a high of 16,000 vehicles between US 222 and Bernville to a low of 5,400 vehicles between I-78/US 22 and PA 419. None of PA 183 is part of the National Highway System.

== History ==
Pennsylvania Route 83
- Location: Devon–Schuylkill Haven
- Existed: 1927–1961

When Pennsylvania designated legislative routes in 1911, what is now PA 183 was not given a legislative number. In 1927, PA 83 was designated to run from US 30/PA 1 in Devon northwest to US 120/PA 42 (now PA 61) near Schuylkill Haven. The route headed north from Devon to Valley Forge on Waterloo Road, Devon State Road, Valley Forge Road, and Valley Creek Road. From Valley Forge, PA 83 continued northwest concurrent with PA 23 through Phoenixville. Northwest of here, PA 83 headed northwest parallel to the Schuylkill River to Reading, where it turned north to follow Poplar Neck Road and 9th Street before heading west along US 22/PA 3 on Penn Street. From Reading, PA 83 followed the current alignment of PA 183 to northwest of Bernville, where it headed to the west to Rehrersburg before heading north. In Schubert, the route continued north along the current alignment of PA 183 to Schuylkill Haven. PA 83 followed the alignment of Legislative Route 201 between Valley Forge and North Coventry Township and Legislative Route 147 between North Coventry Township and Reading. The route had a total length of about 72 miles (116 km).

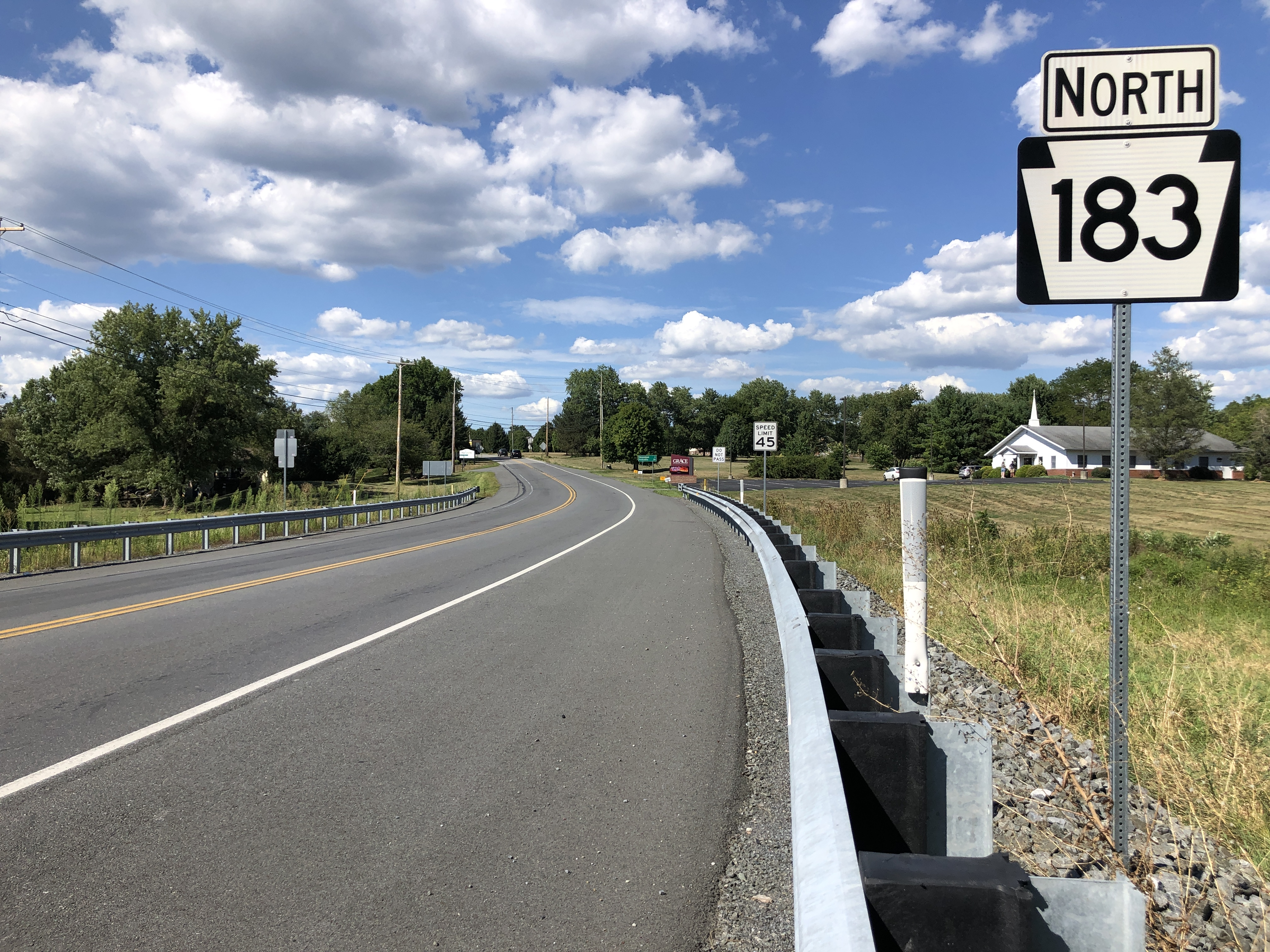
PA 183 northbound in Jefferson Township

When first designated, all of PA 83 was paved except the portion between Rehrersburg and the intersection with PA 443. The remaining unpaved portion was paved by 1940. By 1950, PA 83 was shifted to a new alignment between Kenilworth and Parker Ford, with the former alignment now Old Schuylkill Road. PA 83 was split into a one-way pair in downtown Reading by 1953, being rerouted from following US 422 on Penn Street to following Chestnut Street westbound and Franklin Street eastbound, where it ran concurrent with US 422 Alt. By 1960, PA 83 was realigned to a more direct alignment between Bernville and Schubert, passing through Strausstown. PA 83 was renumbered to PA 183 in 1961 to avoid conflict with I-83, which was located in South Central Pennsylvania. Also, the southern terminus was cut back to PA 23 near Phoenixville. The former alignment of PA 83 between Devon and Valley Forge became a southern extension of PA 363 (now unnumbered Waterloo Road, Devon State Road, Valley Forge Road, and PA 252) while the designation was removed from the concurrency with PA 23 between Valley Forge and Phoenixville. By 1966, the southern terminus of PA 183 was truncated to US 422 Bus. in Reading, with the former alignment of PA 183 south of there becoming PA 724 between Phoenixville and southeast of Reading and an unnumbered road between there and Reading.

== Major intersections ==
County	Location	mi	km	Destinations	Notes
Berks	Reading	0.000	0.000	US 422 Bus. (Washington Street / North 2nd Street) – Business District, Penn Street Bridge	Southern terminus
Berks	Reading	1.616	2.601	To PA 12 east (Warren Street Bypass) – Pricetown	Access via Lehigh Street
Berks	Reading	1.847	2.972	To PA 12 west (Warren Street Bypass) – Lebanon	Access via Lackawanna Street
Berks	Bern Township	4.684	7.538	US 222 – Lancaster, Allentown	Interchange
Berks	Upper Tulpehocken Township	19.174	30.858	I-78 / US 22 – Harrisburg, Allentown	Exit 19 (I-78/US 22)
Berks	Bethel Township	21.166	34.063	PA 419 south (Four Point Road) – Rehrersburg, Harrisburg	Northern terminus of PA 419
Schuylkill	Wayne Township	25.060	40.330	PA 895 (Fair Road) – Pine Grove, Deer Lake	
Schuylkill	Wayne Township	28.804	46.356	PA 443 (Long Run Road) – Pine Grove, Schuylkill Haven	
Schuylkill	Cressona	30.664	49.349	PA 183 Truck north (Wilder Street)	Southern terminus of PA 183 Truck
Schuylkill	Cressona	30.979	49.856	PA 901 west / PA 183 Truck south (Sillyman Street) – Minersville	Eastern terminus of PA 901; northern terminus of PA 183 Truck
Schuylkill	North Manheim Township	31.681	50.986	PA 61 – Pottsville, Schuylkill Haven, Reading	Northern terminus
1.000 mi = 1.609 km; 1.000 km = 0.621 mi

== PA 183 Truck ==
Pennsylvania Route 183 Truck
- Location: Cressona
- Length: 1.6 mi (2.6 km)

Pennsylvania Route 183 Truck (PA 183 Truck) is a 1.6-mile-long (2.6 km) truck route of PA 183 that bypasses a low-clearance bridge under the Reading Blue Mountain and Northern Railroad in Cressona. The truck route follows Wilder Street north and curves to the northwest out of Cressona into North Manheim Township. PA 183 Truck turns north onto Beckville Road and heads east, crossing the railroad tracks at-grade. The route turns northeast and crosses over the West Branch Schuylkill River before it comes to an intersection with PA 901. At this point, PA 183 Truck heads south to form a concurrency with PA 901 along Gordon Nagle Trail, heading back into Cressona and becoming Sillyman Street. The truck route and PA 901 both end at an intersection with PA 183.
