= Host, Pennsylvania =

Unincorporated community in Pennsylvania, U.S.

Coordinates: 40°23′01″N 75°43′58″W

Host is an unincorporated community in southeastern Tulpehocken Township, Berks County, Pennsylvania, United States. The community is located along Pennsylvania Route 419 in a predominantly agricultural area of northwestern Berks County.

== Geography ==
Host is located in southeastern Tulpehocken Township in northwestern Berks County, Pennsylvania. The community lies along Pennsylvania Route 419 in a predominantly agricultural region characterized by farms, open fields, and rural residences.

The surrounding landscape forms part of the fertile agricultural countryside for which Berks County is known.

== History ==
Host developed within the early German-speaking settlement of the Tulpehocken region of Berks County, which was colonized during the eighteenth century by immigrants from German-speaking areas of Europe. The surrounding Tulpehocken Valley became one of the principal centers of Pennsylvania Dutch settlement in Pennsylvania.

The community's name is associated with Host Reformed Church, a historic congregation in Tulpehocken Township. Surviving church records date to the mid-eighteenth century, and some local histories identify the congregation as one of the earliest Reformed churches in the Tulpehocken settlement.

Host appeared on nineteenth-century maps of Tulpehocken Township, indicating that it was an established local community by that period.

== Education ==
Public school students in Host attend the Tulpehocken Area School District. The district serves Tulpehocken Township and surrounding communities in northwestern Berks County. Tulpehocken Area Junior-Senior High School is located in nearby Jefferson Township.
