= Interstate 78 in Pennsylvania =

Highway in Pennsylvania, US

Interstate 78
- I-78 highlighted in red

Route information
- Maintained by PennDOT and DRJTBC
- Length: 77.95 mi (125.45 km)
- Existed: 1957–present
- History: Completed in 1989
- NHS: Entire route

Major junctions
- West end: I-81 in Union Township
- US 22 from Bethel Township to Upper Macungie Township; PA 501 in Bethel; PA 183 near Strausstown; PA 61 near Hamburg; PA 100 in Fogelsville; PA 145 / PA 309 in Summit Lawn; US 222 / PA 222 in Dorneyville; PA 29 near Allentown; PA 33 in Lower Saucon Township
- East end: I-78 at the New Jersey state line in Easton

Location
- Country: United States
- State: Pennsylvania
- Counties: Lebanon, Berks, Lehigh, Northampton

Highway system
- Interstate Highway System; Main; Auxiliary; Suffixed; Business; Future; Pennsylvania State Route System; Interstate; US; State; Scenic; Legislative
← PA 77	→ PA 78
← PA 177	I-178	→ PA 178

Interstate 78 (I-78) is a major east–west Interstate Highway stretching from Union Township, Lebanon County, Pennsylvania, in the west to the Holland Tunnel and New York City in the east. In Pennsylvania, I-78 runs for about 78 miles (126 km) from the western terminus at I-81 in Union Township east to the New Jersey state line near Easton in Northampton County.

Much of I-78 west of Allentown predates the Interstate Highway System as a freeway upgrade of U.S. Route 22 (US 22), which runs concurrently with I-78 between Bethel Township and Upper Macungie Township. The Interstate, originally planned as Interstate 80N (I-80N), was supposed to continue its concurrency with US 22 to the New Jersey state line but was realigned to the south due to local opposition.

Two auxiliary routes, Interstate 178 (I-178) and I-378, were also planned as spurs into Allentown and Bethlehem respectively, but I-178 was never built and I-378 became Pennsylvania Route 378 (PA 378) since it did not connect to I-78.

== Route description ==
=== Lebanon and Berks counties ===
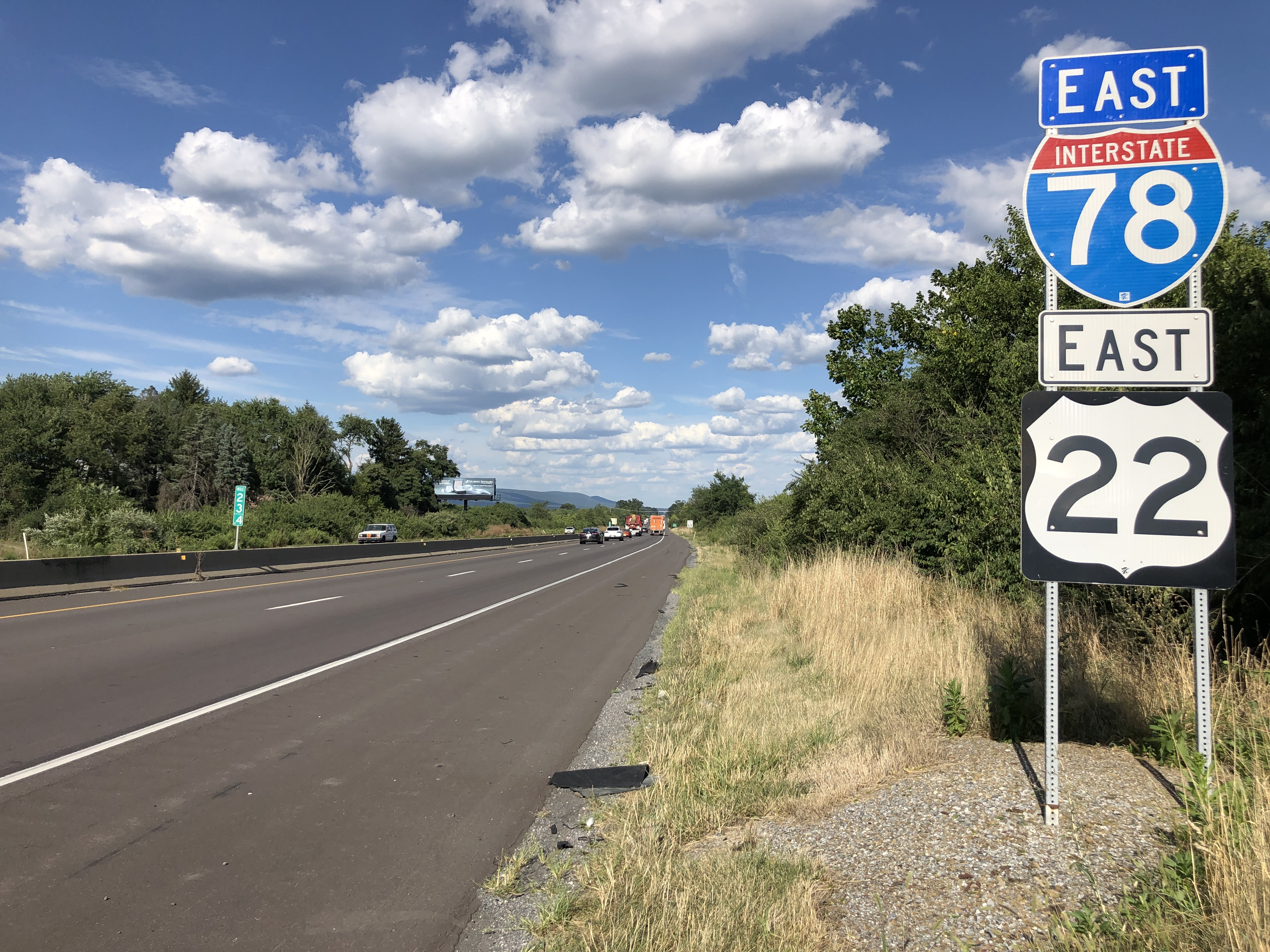
I-78/US 22 eastbound past the Shartlesville exit

I-78 begins at an interchange with I-81 in Union Township in Lebanon County, heading east as a four-lane freeway. In Lebanon County, I-78 is known as the 78th Division Highway. The road passes under PA 72 and turns northeast through a mix of farmland and woodland, crossing the Swatara Creek into Swatara Township. The freeway continues through agricultural areas with some trees, curving east and entering Bethel Township. I-78 passes north of Fredericksburg and comes to an eastbound exit and westbound entrance with the northern terminus of PA 343. Following this, the freeway passes through more rural areas with some nearby development and reaches a westbound exit and eastbound entrance with US 22 (William Penn Highway). At this point, US 22 becomes concurrent with I-78 and the median of the freeway narrows from a grassy median to a Jersey barrier.

I-78/US 22 enters Bethel Township in Berks County and heads east-northeast through agricultural areas to the south of the Blue Mountain ridge, coming to a diamond interchange with PA 645 north of Frystown. The road continues through farmland with some warehouses and reaches a diamond interchange with PA 501 north of Bethel. The freeway heads through a mix of farms and woods, passing to the south of Grimes Airport and coming to a right-in/right-out interchange with Court Street eastbound and Frantz Road westbound; this interchange has no access across the freeway. I-78/US 22 soon reaches a diamond interchange with Midway Road as it passes through more rural land, coming to a diamond interchange with PA 419 south of Schubert. Past this interchange, the road runs through a mix of farms and woods, crossing the Little Swatara Creek into Upper Tulpehocken Township. The freeway reaches a diamond interchange with PA 183 north of Strausstown and continues through agricultural areas with some woodland. I-78/US 22 crosses Northkill Creek into Upper Bern Township and comes to a diamond interchange with Mountain Road north of Shartlesville. At this point, I-78/US 22 becomes the CMSgt. Richard L. Etchberger Memorial Highway, in honor of Richard Etchberger. Following this interchange, the road heads northeast through farm fields with some trees and homes and crosses into Tilden Township.

In Tilden Township, the freeway continues northeast and reaches a partial cloverleaf interchange with PA 61 in a business area that includes a 250,000-square-foot (23,000 m^{2}) Cabela's store. Past PA 61, I-78/US 22 comes to a bridge over the Reading Blue Mountain and Northern Railroad's Reading Division line and the Schuylkill River. Upon crossing the river, I-78/US 22 enters the borough of Hamburg and passes through residential areas, coming to a diamond interchange at North 4th Street that serves Hamburg. The road leaves Hamburg for Windsor Township and heads through agricultural areas with some woods and homes, curving to the east. Farther east, the parallel Blue Mountain ridge heads further north from the freeway. I-78/US 22 crosses into Greenwich Township and comes to a partial cloverleaf interchange with PA 143 north of the borough of Lenhartsville. The CMSgt. Richard L. Etchberger Memorial Highway name for I-78/US 22 ends at this interchange. Past this interchange, the road crosses Maiden Creek and runs through a mix of farm fields and woodland. Farther east, the freeway reaches a diamond interchange with PA 737 south of Krumsville. The road continues east through rural land with some nearby development, passing through the northern corner of Maxatawny Township.

=== Lehigh and Northampton counties ===
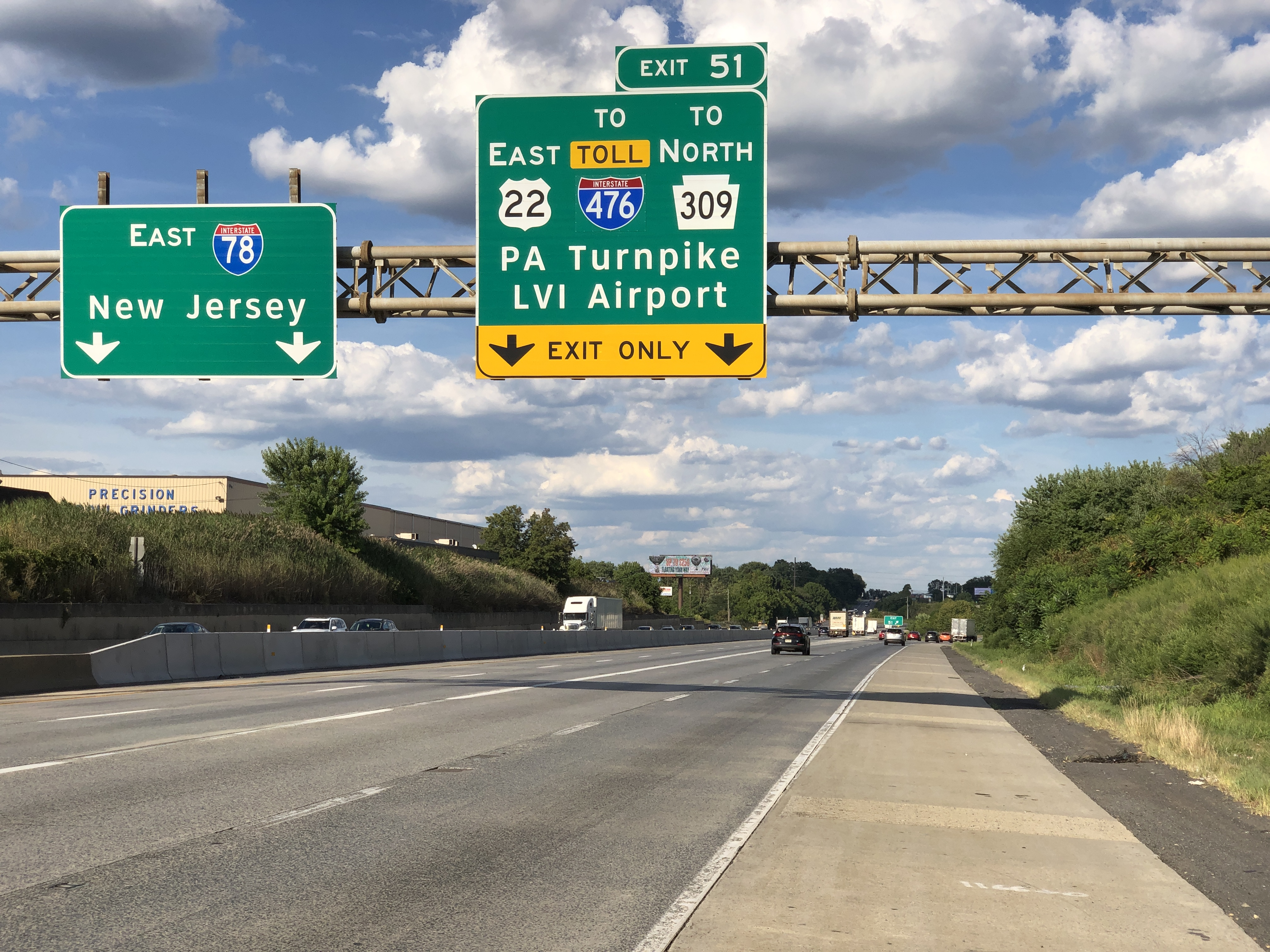
I-78 eastbound at split with US 22 eastbound in Upper Macungie Township

I-78/US 22 enters Weisenberg Township in Lehigh County, where the freeway becomes the Walter J. Dealtrey Memorial Highway and continues east through farms and woods in the Lehigh Valley, passing north of New Smithville. The road passes south of warehouses and comes to a diamond interchange with PA 863.

Following this interchange, the freeway heads to the south of more warehouses and runs through more rural areas with some homes, crossing into Upper Macungie Township. I-78/US 22 runs between farm fields to the north and warehouses and industrial development to the south before it comes to a cloverleaf interchange with PA 100 in a business area in Fogelsville. After the PA 100 interchange, the freeway widens to six lanes and heads east through industrial areas, coming to a bridge over Norfolk Southern Railway's C&F Secondary railroad line before curving northeast. In Kuhnsville, US 22 splits from I-78 at an eastbound exit and westbound entrance by heading northeast on a freeway called the Lehigh Valley Thruway. From here, I-78 continues east-southeast as a four-lane freeway, passing residential subdivisions with some commercial development. The freeway continues southeast and passes over I-476 (Pennsylvania Turnpike Northeast Extension) before it comes to a westbound exit and eastbound entrance with the PA 309 freeway.

At this point, PA 309 becomes concurrent with I-78 and the freeway enters Lower Macungie Township, widening to six lanes and running past commercial development to the southwest of the Dorney Park & Wildwater Kingdom amusement park. The freeway reaches a partial cloverleaf interchange with the northern terminus of US 222 and the southern terminus of PA 222 at Hamilton Boulevard, which provides access to the cities of Allentown and Reading. Following this interchange, the road crosses into South Whitehall Township and heads east between residential areas to the north and farm fields to the south, before entering Salisbury Township and passing north of Lehigh Valley Hospital–Cedar Crest. Past the hospital, I-78/PA 309 comes to a partial cloverleaf interchange with the northern terminus of the southern section of PA 29 at Cedar Crest Boulevard before running between residential areas to the north and office buildings to the south. The freeway enters Allentown and runs through woodland, crossing Little Lehigh Creek before it passes through a small section of Salisbury Township. The road heads back into Allentown and runs near residential areas, passing south of Allentown Queen City Municipal Airport before it comes to a partial cloverleaf interchange at Lehigh Street. I-78/PA 309 runs near industrial areas and passes over Norfolk Southern Railway's Reading Line before coming to a westbound exit ramp serving Emaus Avenue. The freeway passes near neighborhoods before it leaves Allentown for Salisbury Township, where it ascends forested South Mountain. The highway comes to an eastbound exit and westbound entrance with Rock Road that provides a connection to PA 145 in Summit Lawn, where it crosses into Upper Saucon Township. Following this, the freeway turns southeast and comes to an interchange with the southern terminus of PA 145 in Lanark, at which point PA 309 splits from I-78 by heading southeast on a surface road toward the borough of Quakertown. From here, I-78 turns northeast, narrowing to four lanes with the median changing from a Jersey barrier to a grassy median. The road heads between South Mountain to the northwest and a mix of farm fields, woods, and development to the southeast.

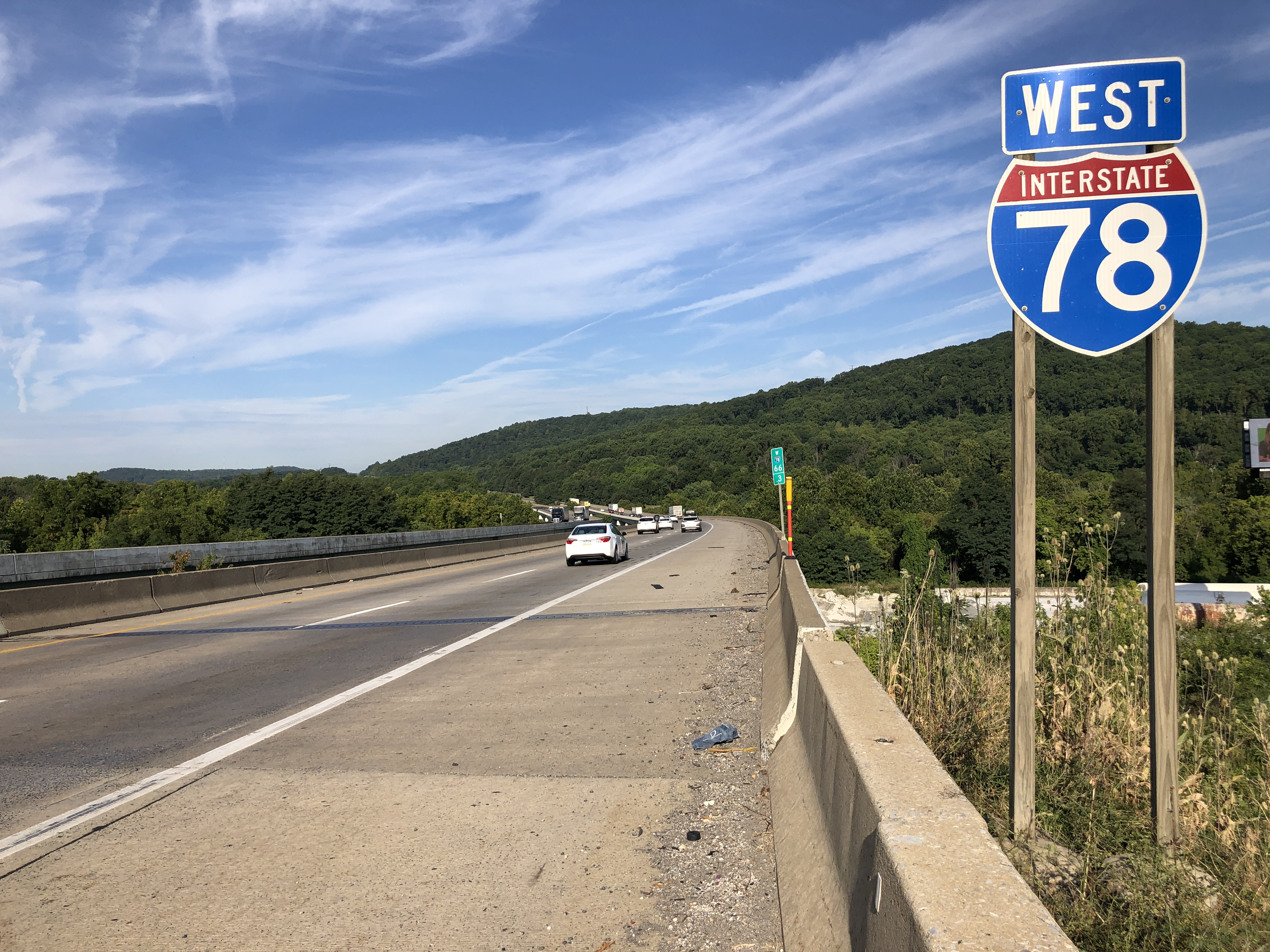
I-78 westbound past the PA 412 interchange in Bethlehem

I-78 enters Lower Saucon Township in Northampton County and passes over PA 378 as it curves north near residential development. The road turns to the east-northeast and runs between forested South Mountain to the north and farmland and homes to the south, entering Bethlehem. The freeway crosses the Saucon Creek and becomes the border between Bethlehem to the north and the borough of Hellertown to the south before it comes to a partial cloverleaf interchange with PA 412 that serves Bethlehem and Hellertown. Following this interchange, I-78 fully enters Bethlehem before it crosses back into Lower Saucon Township, turning to the northeast and running through wooded areas with some farm fields and homes, heading across the East Branch Saucon Creek. The road comes to a trumpet interchange with the southern terminus of the PA 33 freeway, which heads north toward the Pocono Mountains region. Past this interchange, the freeway crosses into Williams Township and continues through rural areas with some development, crossing into the borough of Glendon. I-78 turns east as it passes south of industrial areas, leaving Glendon for Williams Township. The road comes to a diamond interchange with Morgan Hill Road, which heads north into Easton and provides access to PA 611 via city streets. Past this interchange, the freeway widens to six lanes and passes near residential and commercial development, coming to a westbound welcome center and a westbound toll plaza for the Interstate 78 Toll Bridge. From here, I-78 runs through wooded areas and turns southeast, heading onto the Interstate 78 Toll Bridge, which carries the freeway over PA 611 and the Delaware Canal before crossing the Delaware River where I-78 enters New Jersey.

== History ==
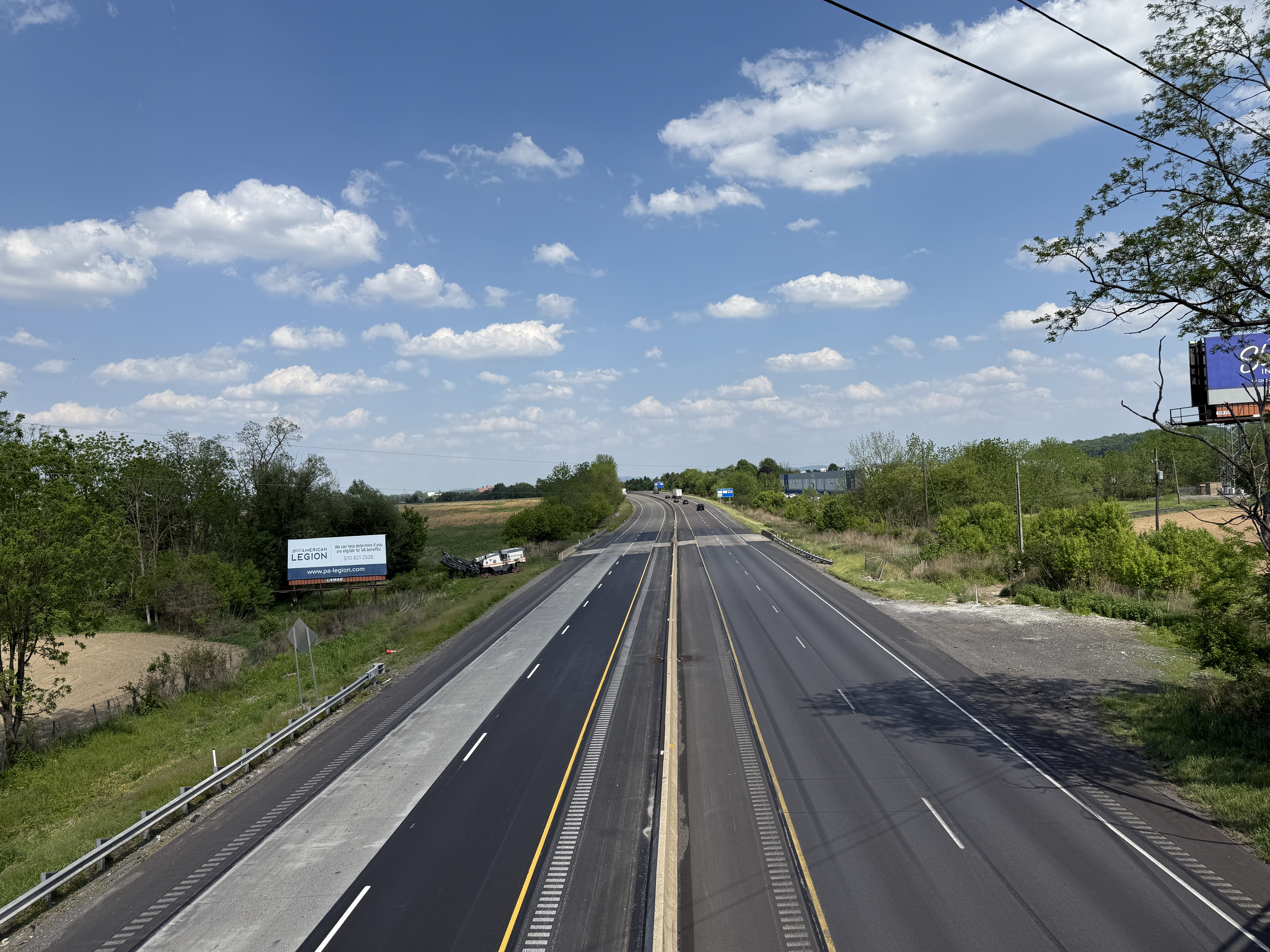
I-78/US 22 eastbound in Upper Macungie Township

Construction of the freeway between Lebanon and Lehigh counties took place between 1950 and 1970, originally as an upgraded alignment of US 22. All of I-78 was completed by 1989. When the Interstate Highway System numbers were first assigned in 1957, the route was planned as I-80N. Prior to the late 1960s, I-78 was to be routed on the Lehigh Valley Thruway across to Phillipsburg, New Jersey, continuing the concurrency with US 22; however, because of heavy opposition by residents of Phillipsburg, the Pennsylvania Department of Transportation (PennDOT) and the New Jersey Department of Transportation (NJDOT) opted to build the new southerly route I-78 follows today.

=== Interstate 178 ===
Interstate 178
- Location: Allentown, PA
- Existed: 1950s–1971

Interstate 178 (I-178) was a proposed spur from I-78 but was canceled because the Liberty Bell Museum, which had since closed, was in the path of the proposed expressway. Additionally, locals opposed the destruction of Sixth and Seventh Streets to accommodate the highway. The planned northern terminus would have been between the 15th Street and PA 145 interchanges. If built, I-178 would have connected US 22, formerly designated I-78, into Allentown.

This route was shown in Rand McNally atlases in the late 1960s but was not included in the 1971 federal Interstate route log. The route was supposed to end near Muhlenberg College.

=== Interstate 378 ===
Interstate 378
- Location: Bethlehem, PA
- Existed: 1968–1971

I-378 was the designation for a spur route that would extend from I-78 into Bethlehem. At the time, I-78 was to be designated as the Lehigh Valley Thruway, concurrent with US 22. Unlike I-178, the route was built. When I-78 was built as a new route south of this area, I-378 had no direct connection to I-78 and therefore was renumbered to PA 378. The route still remains, as a freeway with exits and their own numbers.

When I-178 and I-378 were planned (and I-378 was built), I-78 was to run the length of the Lehigh Valley Thruway. Later, I-78 was built as a new route south of the Thruway. This was due to opposition to continue the concurrency with the Lehigh Valley Thruway into New Jersey.

=== Improvements in Berks County ===
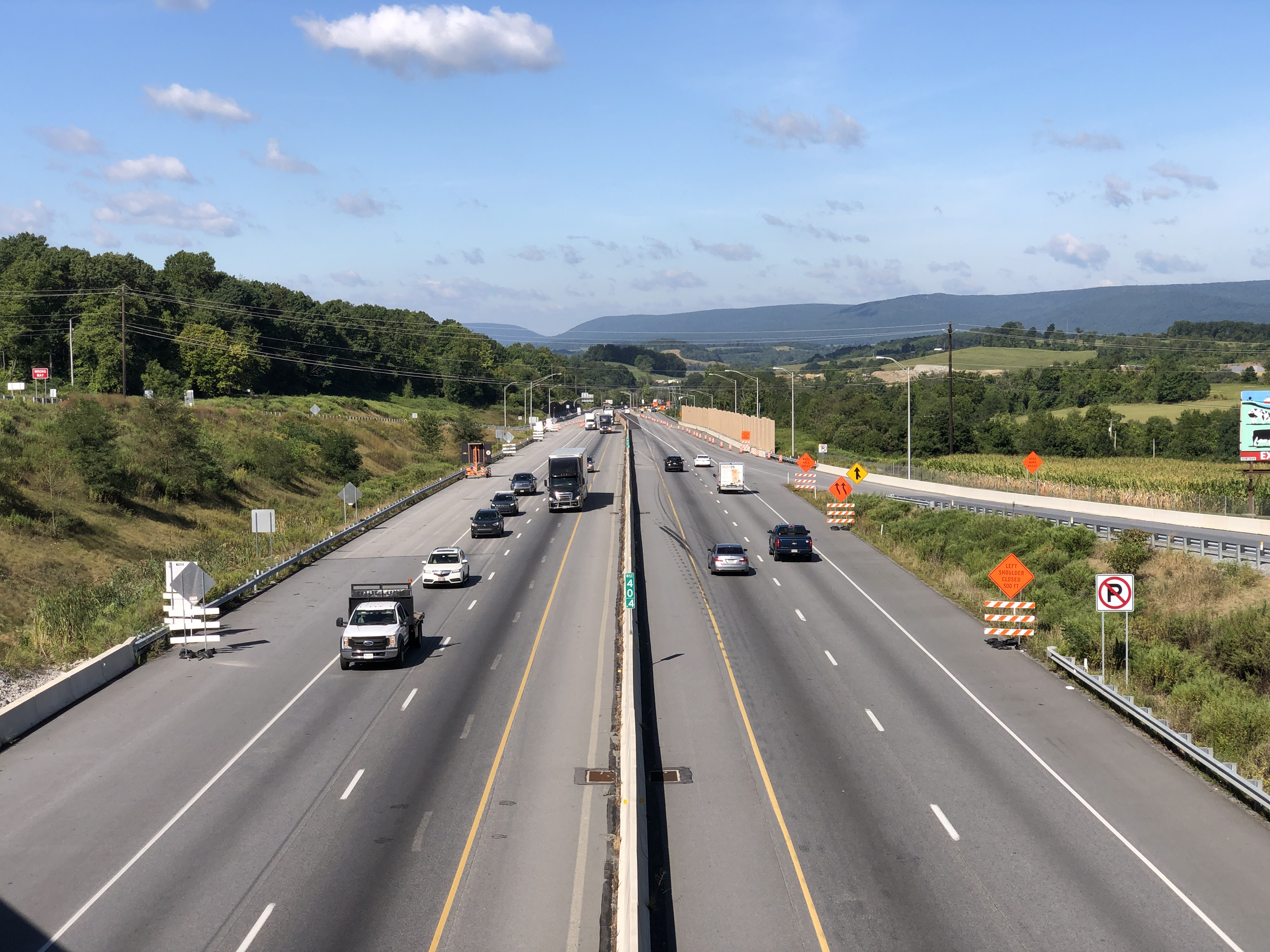
I-78/US 22 westbound at the PA 737 interchange in Krumsville

In 2013, PennDOT announced plans to improve a portion of I-78 in eastern Berks County. The project will redesign the PA 737 interchange, add truck lanes, widen lanes and shoulders, and raise the height of three overpasses. Construction began in 2015 and is planned to be completed in 2025 at a cost of $412.6 million. In 2020, a project began to improve the section of I-78 in Hamburg by reconstructing and reconfiguring the PA 61 interchange and widening and rehabilitating the bridges over the Schuylkill River and Port Clinton Avenue. Construction on this project is planned to be completed in December 2025 at a cost of $125.4 million.

== Exit list ==
County	Location	mi	km	Old exit	New exit	Destinations	Notes
Lebanon	Union Township	0.00	0.00		1B	I-81 south – Harrisburg	Western terminus
Lebanon	Union Township	0.55	0.89		1A	I-81 north – Hazleton	Westbound exit and eastbound entrance; exit 89 on I-81
Lebanon	Bethel Township	5.85	9.41	1	6	PA 343 south – Lebanon, Fredericksburg	Eastbound exit and westbound entrance; northern terminus of PA 343
Lebanon	Bethel Township	7.90	12.71	1	8	US 22 west to PA 343 – Lebanon, Fredericksburg	Western end of US 22 concurrency; westbound exit and eastbound entrance
Berks	Bethel Township	10.21	16.43	2	10	PA 645 – Frystown	
Berks	Bethel Township	12.68	20.41	3	13	PA 501 – Bethel	
Berks	Bethel Township	14.67	23.61	4	15	Grimes	Right-in/right-out connections only; access via Court Street/Frantz Road; no tractor trailers
Berks	Bethel Township	15.40	24.78	5	16	Midway	Access via Midway Road
Berks	Bethel Township	16.58	26.68	6	17	PA 419 – Rehrersburg	Access to Conrad Weiser Homestead
Berks	Upper Tulpehocken Township	18.65	30.01	7	19	PA 183 – Strausstown	
Berks	Upper Bern Township	22.71	36.55	8	23	Shartlesville	Access via Mountain Road
Berks	Tilden Township	29.11– 29.35	46.85– 47.23	9	29	PA 61 – Pottsville, Reading	
Berks	Hamburg	30.19	48.59	10	30	Hamburg	Access via North 4th Street
Berks	Greenwich Township	35.23	56.70	11	35	PA 143 – Lenhartsville	
Berks	Greenwich Township	40.27	64.81	12	40	PA 737 – Kutztown, Krumsville	Access to Kutztown University of Pennsylvania
Lehigh	Weisenberg Township	44.96	72.36	13	45	PA 863 – Lynnport, New Smithville	
Lehigh	Upper Macungie Township	49.26– 49.55	79.28– 79.74	14	49	PA 100 – Trexlertown, Fogelsville	Signed as exits 49A (south) and 49B (north)
Lehigh	Upper Macungie Township	50.89	81.90	15	51	US 22 east to I-476 / Penna Turnpike NE Extension / PA 309 north – Lehigh Valley International Airport	Eastern end of US 22 concurrency; eastbound exit and westbound entrance
Lehigh	Lower Macungie Township	53.67	86.37		53	PA 309 north to I-476 / Penna Turnpike NE Extension – Tamaqua	Western end of PA 309 concurrency; westbound exit and eastbound entrance
Lehigh	Lower Macungie–South Whitehall township line	54.12– 54.51	87.10– 87.73	16	54	US 222 south / PA 222 north (Hamilton Boulevard)	Signed as exits 54A (south) and 54B (north) westbound; northern terminus of US 222; southern terminus of PA 222
Lehigh	Salisbury Township	55.41	89.17	17	55	PA 29 south (Cedar Crest Boulevard)	Northern terminus of PA 29
Lehigh	Allentown	57.20	92.05	18	57	Lehigh Street	
Lehigh	Allentown	57.63	92.75	18B	58	Emaus Avenue south	Westbound exit only
Lehigh	Upper Saucon Township	58.83	94.68	19	59	To PA 145 – Summit Lawn	Eastbound exit and westbound entrance; access via Rock Road
Lehigh	Upper Saucon Township	59.92– 60.30	96.43– 97.04	20	60	PA 145 north / PA 309 south to South 4th Street – Quakertown	Eastern end of PA 309 concurrency; no eastbound access to PA 145; signed as exits 60A (south) and 60B (north) westbound
Northampton	Bethlehem	66.36	106.80	21	67	PA 412 – Hellertown, Bethlehem	Access to Lehigh University and Wind Creek Bethlehem
Northampton	Lower Saucon Township	71.04	114.33		71	PA 33 north to US 22 – Stroudsburg	Southern terminus of PA 33; access to Lehigh Valley International Airport and Pocono Mountains
Northampton	Williams Township	75.00	120.70	22	75	To PA 611 – Easton, Philadelphia	Access via Morgan Hill Road; access to Crayola Attractions and Lafayette College
Northampton	Williams Township			Rest area and welcome center (westbound)			
Delaware River		77.10	124.08	Interstate 78 Toll Bridge (westbound toll)			
Delaware River		77.10	124.08		—	I-78 east – New York City	Continuation into New Jersey
1.000 mi = 1.609 km; 1.000 km = 0.621 mi: Concurrency terminus; Incomplete access; Tolled

== See also ==
Interstate 78
Previous state: Terminus	Pennsylvania	Next state: New Jersey
