= Tulpehocken Area School District =

School district in Pennsylvania

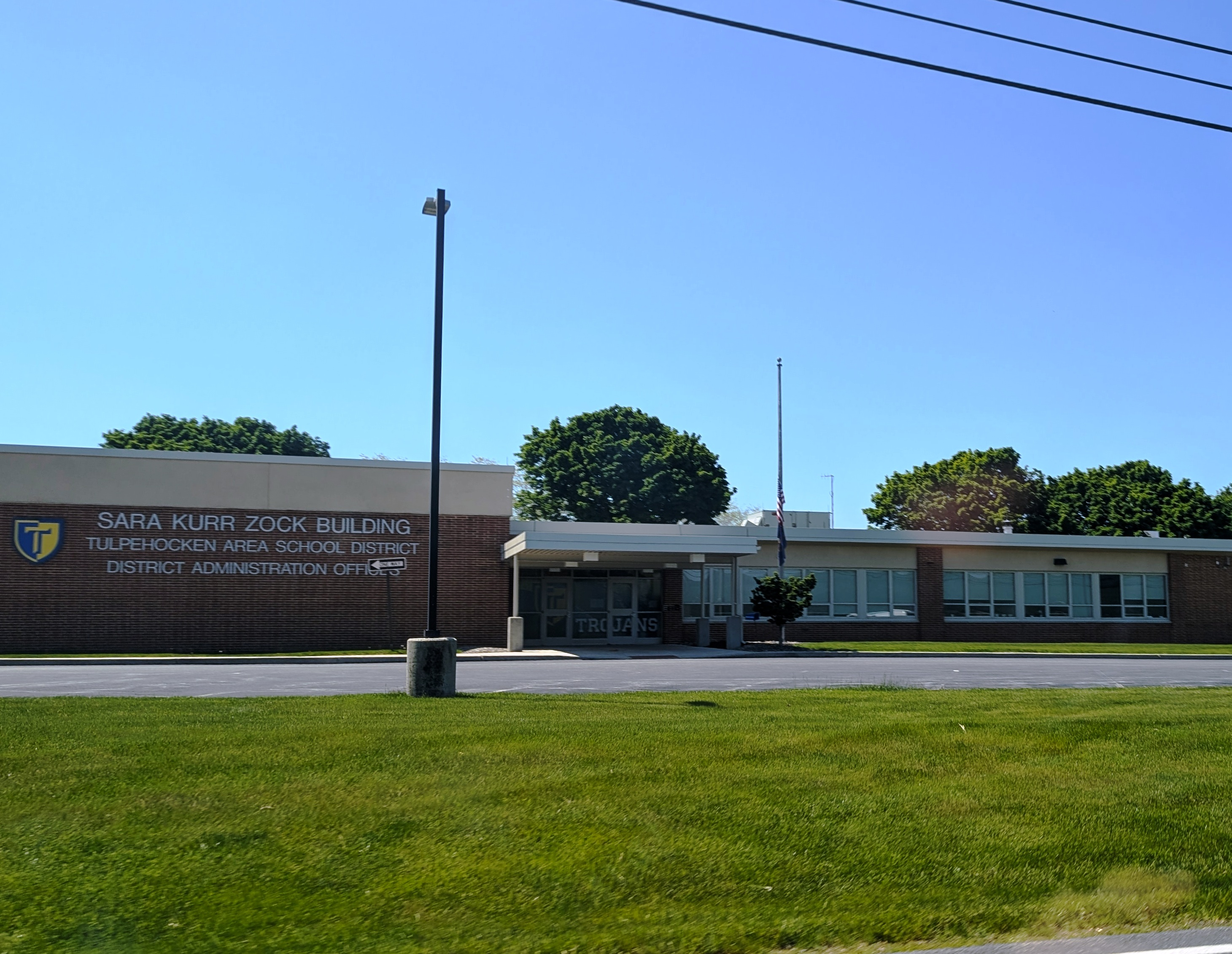
- District offices near Rehrersburg

Location
- Berks County, Pennsylvania United States

District information
- Type: Public
- Grades: K-12
- Superintendent: Andrew Netznik
- Schools: 3

Students and staff
- Enrollment: 1,305 (as of 2022–23)
- Faculty: 115.4 FTEs
- Student–teacher ratio: 11.3:1

Other information
- Website: www.tulpehocken.org

The Tulpehocken Area School District is a school district located in northwestern Berks County, Pennsylvania. The district serves three different schools. Penn-Bernville Elementary and Bethel Elementary are the two elementary schools that enroll students in Kindergarten through 6th Grade. Penn-Bernville Elementary was one of 11 schools recognized as a Blue Ribbon School for Excellence Award Lighthouse School in 2011. The Tulpehocken Jr/Sr High School, located in Jefferson Township, enrolls the rest of the students, 7th through 12th Grade. The district serves the borough of Bernville, as well as the townships of Bethel, Jefferson, Penn, and Tulpehocken.The Tulpehocken Area School District also offers students an online alternative to cyber-charter school education called the Tulpehocken Virtual Academy. The district is one of the 500 public school districts of Pennsylvania.

As of the 2022–23 school year, the district, comprising three schools, had an enrollment of 1,305 students and 115.4 classroom teachers (on an FTE basis), for a student–teacher ratio of 11.3:1.
