= Pennsylvania Route 501 =

State highway in Pennsylvania, US

Pennsylvania Route 501
- PA 501 highlighted in red

Route information
- Maintained by PennDOT
- Length: 38.695 mi (62.274 km)
- Existed: 1928–present

Major junctions
- South end: US 222 / PA 272 in Lancaster
- US 30 / US 222 in Lancaster; PA 722 in Neffsville; PA 772 in Lititz; US 322 in Brickerville; PA 419 / PA 897 in Schaefferstown; US 422 in Myerstown; I-78 / US 22 in Bethel
- North end: PA 895 near Pine Grove

Location
- Country: United States
- State: Pennsylvania
- Counties: Lancaster, Lebanon, Berks, Schuylkill

Highway system
- Pennsylvania State Route System; Interstate; US; State; Scenic; Legislative
← I-495	→ PA 502
← PA 242	PA 243	→ PA 244

Pennsylvania Route 501 (PA 501) is a north–south state highway in south central Pennsylvania that runs for 38.7 miles (62.3 km). Its southern terminus is at U.S. Route 222 (US 222) and PA 272 north of Lancaster, and its northern terminus is PA 895 southeast of Pine Grove. The route heads north from Lancaster and runs through suburban and rural areas in northern Lancaster County, passing through Lititz and crossing US 322 in Brickerville. PA 501 continues into Lebanon County and heads into the Lebanon Valley, where it passes through Schaefferstown and intersects US 422 in Myerstown. The route runs through western Berks County, where it has an interchange with Interstate 78 (I-78)/US 22 near the community of Bethel. PA 501 crosses Blue Mountain into Schuylkill County and continues to its northern terminus.

The portion of the road in northern Lancaster County was originally established as two private turnpikes in the 19th century, becoming a public road in 1926. PA 501 was designated in 1928 to run from PA 72 in Lancaster north to PA 5 (now US 322) in Brickerville while PA 243 was designated onto the road running between US 22/PA 3 (now US 422) in Myerstown and PA 43 in Bethel. PA 501 was extended north to US 422 in Myerstown during the 1930s. By 1946, the route replaced PA 243 and continued north to US 22 in Bethel. PA 501 was extended to a new alignment of US 22 north of Bethel by 1953. The southern terminus was cut back to its current location by 1960 to eliminate a concurrency with US 222. By 1966, PA 501 was extended north to PA 895. In 2013, the route was realigned to bypass the center of Schaefferstown to the west.

== Route description ==
=== Lancaster County ===
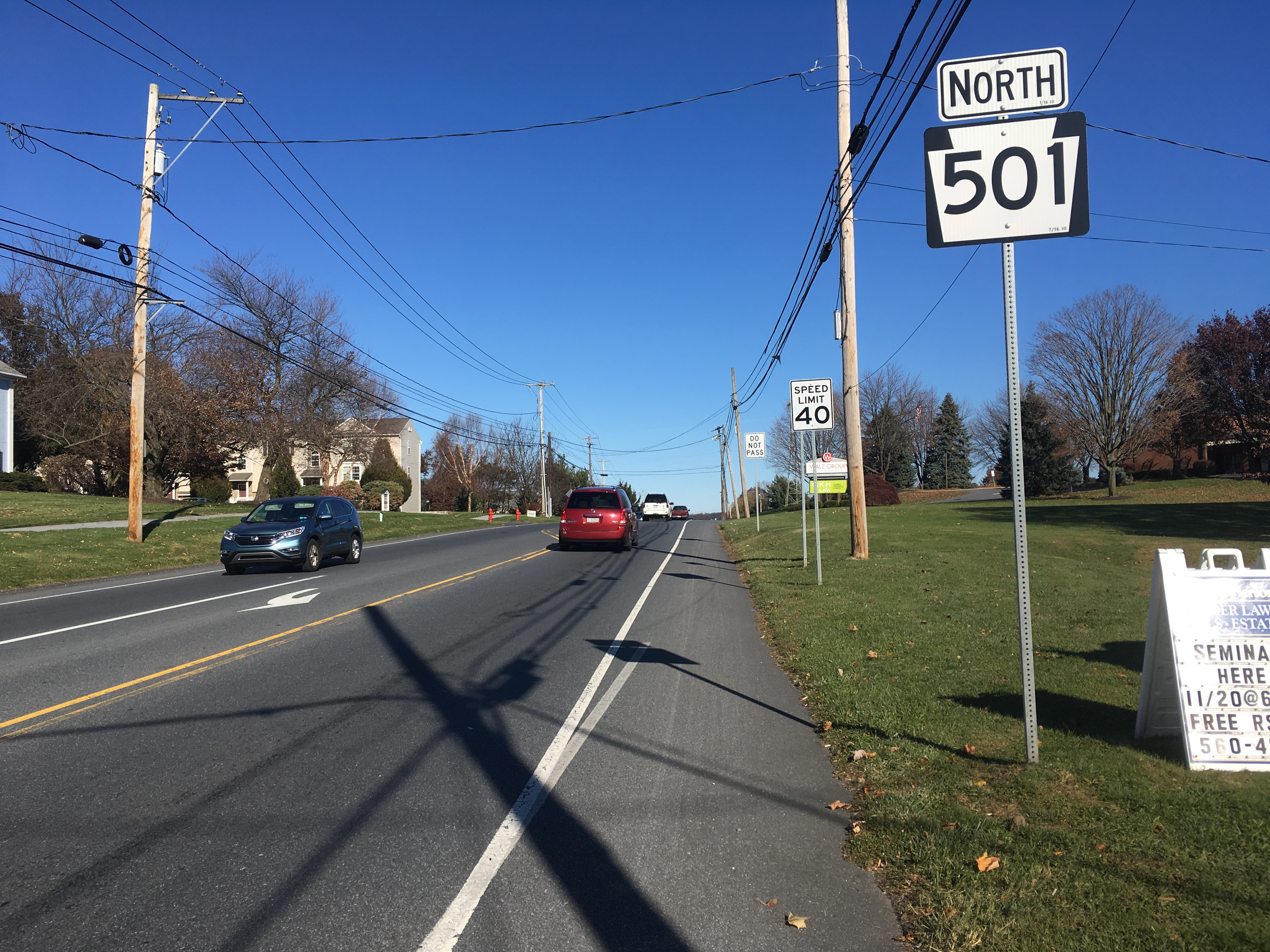
PA 501 northbound past PA 722 in Neffsville

PA 501 begins at an intersection with US 222/PA 272 in the community of Glen Moore in Manheim Township, Lancaster County, north of the city of Lancaster. From here, the route heads north on Lititz Pike, a five-lane road with a center left-turn lane, with the southbound direction running concurrent with southbound US 222. The road passes through business areas and runs to the east of a residential neighborhood before reaching an interchange with the US 30 freeway, where the road is a four-lane divided highway. At this point, the concurrency with southbound US 222 ends and PA 501 continues north as a three-lane road with a center left-turn lane. The route heads through suburban residential areas with some businesses, passing through Overlook and Brooklawn. Farther north, the road narrows to two lanes. In the community of Neffsville, PA 501 intersects PA 722, with that route turning north for a concurrency before it splits to the east on East Oregon Road. Past this, PA 501 passes near more suburban residential and commercial development, gaining a center left-turn lane again. The road becomes two lanes again and runs between farm fields to the west and the Lancaster Airport to the east before it crosses into Warwick Township.

The route widens into a five-lane road with a center left-turn lane and passes between businesses to the west and farmland to the east. The road narrows to three lanes and passes through the residential community of Kissel Hill before it enters commercial areas. PA 501 continues into the borough of Lititz and becomes South Broad Street, running past more businesses before becoming lined with homes. The route continues north and loses the center turn lane before it heads into the commercial downtown and intersects PA 772. At this point, PA 772 turns north for a concurrency with PA 501 before it splits east along East Main Street. PA 501 becomes North Broad Street and crosses Norfolk Southern's Lititz Secondary railroad line at-grade east of the former Lititz station, heading out of the downtown area and passing through residential neighborhoods. The route leaves Lititz for Warwick Township again and becomes Furnace Hills Pike, running past commercial establishments as a three-lane road with a center left-turn lane. The road narrows to two lanes and runs near residential neighborhoods before it crosses into Elizabeth Township, heading northeast through a mix of farmland and woodland with some homes. PA 501 winds north through more rural land and comes to a junction with US 322 (28th Division Highway) in the community of Brickerville. The route passes through more farmland and woods and comes to a bridge over the Pennsylvania Turnpike (I-76), at which point it heads into forested areas. The road traverses South Mountain and curves to the northwest.

=== Lebanon, Berks, and Schuylkill counties ===
PA 501 crosses into Heidelberg Township in Lebanon County and becomes Stiegel Pike, continuing north through forests with some farms and homes and passing through the community of Waldeck. The route heads northeast before it turns to the northwest and enters the agricultural Lebanon Valley in the southeastern portion of Lebanon County, which is home to an Amish community. The road heads north and bypasses the community of Schaefferstown to the west, coming to an intersection with PA 419/PA 897. PA 501 continues north through farmland with occasional homes, passing through the community of Reistville. The route enters Jackson Township and becomes South College Street as it continues through rural areas. Farther north, the road runs near a few commercial establishments and passes under Norfolk Southern's Harrisburg Line, at which point it enters the borough of Myerstown. PA 501 heads past industrial buildings before it crosses Tulpehocken Creek and continues north into residential areas. At the intersection with Main Avenue, the route becomes North College Street and passes more homes before it reaches an intersection with US 422 in a business area. Past this intersection, the road passes homes and leaves Myerstown for Jackson Township again. The route heads north through a mix of farmland and woodland with a few residences.

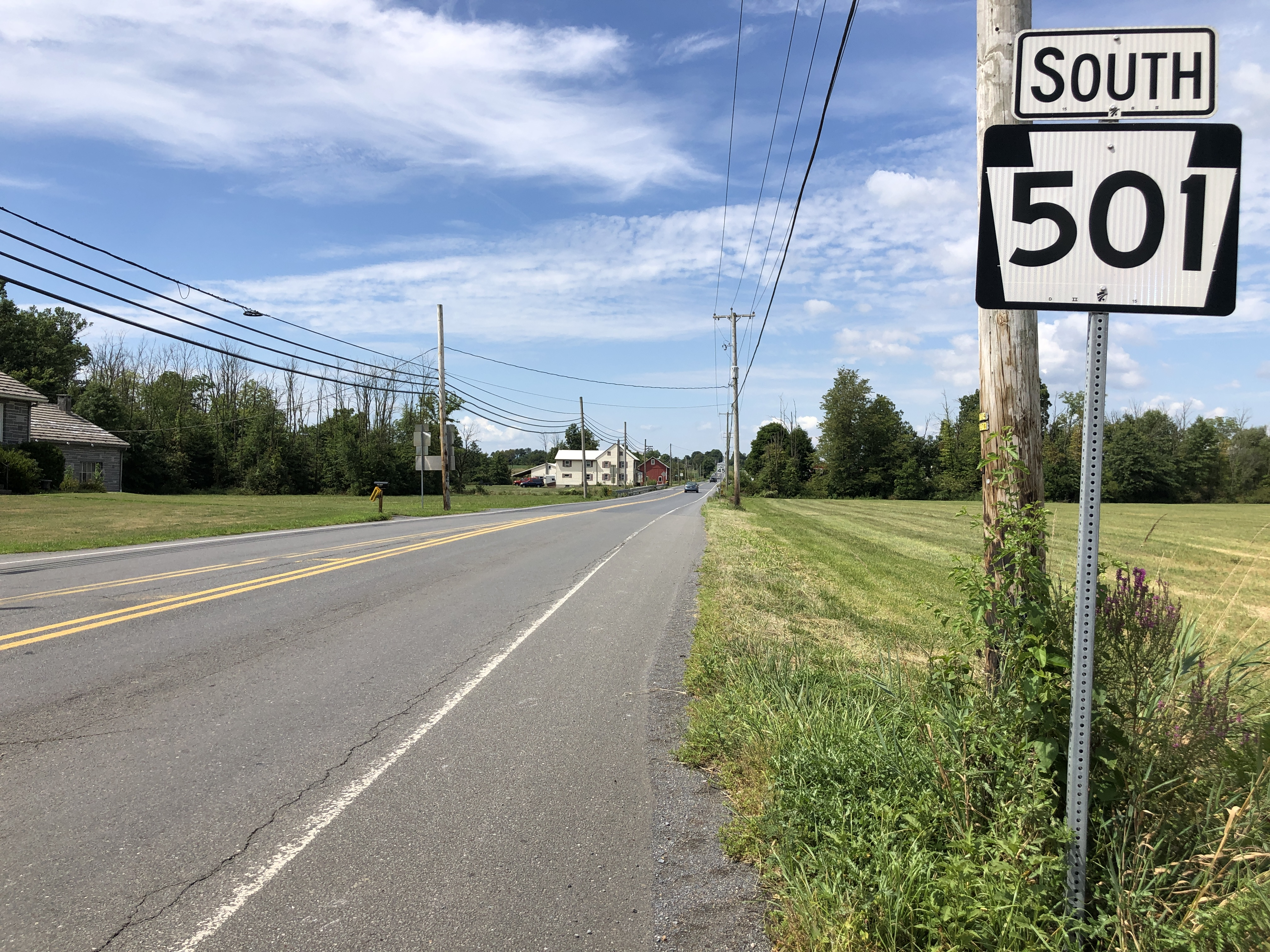
PA 501 southbound in Bethel Township

PA 501 enters Marion Township in Berks County and becomes Lancaster Avenue, heading northeast through farmland with some commercial development into Tulpehocken Township before it passes residences and some businesses in the community of Mount Aetna. The road curves north and runs through farmland, crossing Little Swatara Creek into Bethel Township. The route heads through agricultural areas with some homes and makes a sharp curve to the east. PA 501 turns north to remain along Lancaster Avenue, with Rehrersburg Road continuing east, and runs through more rural land. The road enters the community of Bethel and becomes lined with homes before it intersects Old Route 22 in the center of the community. At this point, the route turns west and remains along Lancaster Avenue, curving to the north into business areas as a three-lane road with a center left-turn lane and reaching an interchange with I-78/US 22. Past this interchange, PA 501 narrows to two lanes and heads through farmland, turning northwest as it passes to the east of a warehouse. The road continues through a mix of farms and trees with some homes, heading to the north. The route runs through agricultural land before it enters forested areas and begins to ascend Blue Mountain. PA 501 turns west as it continues to climb the mountain. At the summit, the route crosses the Appalachian Trail and enters Pine Grove Township in Schuylkill County, where it becomes Bethel Road and descends the mountain. The route turns north at the base of Blue Mountain and runs through a mix of farms and woods with a few homes. PA 501 crosses Lower Little Swatara Creek and reaches its northern terminus at an intersection with PA 895 in the community of Marstown, located southeast of the borough of Pine Grove.

== History ==
The portion of PA 501 between Lancaster and Lititz was chartered as the Lancaster and Lititz Turnpike in 1838, a private turnpike. The roadway between Lititz and Lexington was chartered as the Lititz and Lexington Turnpike in 1882. In 1894, the Lancaster and Lititz Turnpike was leased by the Lancaster Traction Company, which established a trolley line along the turnpike. This trolley line continued to operate until 1938. On October 7, 1926, both the Lancaster and Lititz Turnpike and the Lexington Turnpike were sold to the state and Lancaster County at $70,000 and $4,000, respectively.

Pennsylvania Route 243
- Location: Myerstown – Bethel
- Existed: 1928–1946

When routes were first legislated in Pennsylvania in 1911, the current route of PA 501 was not given a route number. PA 501 was designated in 1928 to run from PA 72 (Prince Street) in Lancaster north to PA 5 (now US 322) in Brickerville, running along a paved road. The route headed east from PA 72 on Liberty Street before it turned north and followed Lititz Avenue out of Lancaster, continuing along its current alignment to Brickerville. PA 243 was designated in 1928 to run from US 22/PA 3 (now US 422) in Myerstown north to PA 43 (now Old Route 22) in Bethel, following an unpaved road. PA 243 was paved by 1930. The road between Brickerville and Myerstown and Bethel and Pine Grove was an unnumbered, unpaved road. In the 1930s, PA 501 was extended north from US 322 in Brickerville to US 422 and the southern terminus of PA 243 in Myerstown along a paved road. Also, US 222 was designated concurrent with the route between PA 72 at Prince Street and Oregon Pike. By this time, the unnumbered road between Bethel and Pine Grove was paved except for a portion crossing Blue Mountain.

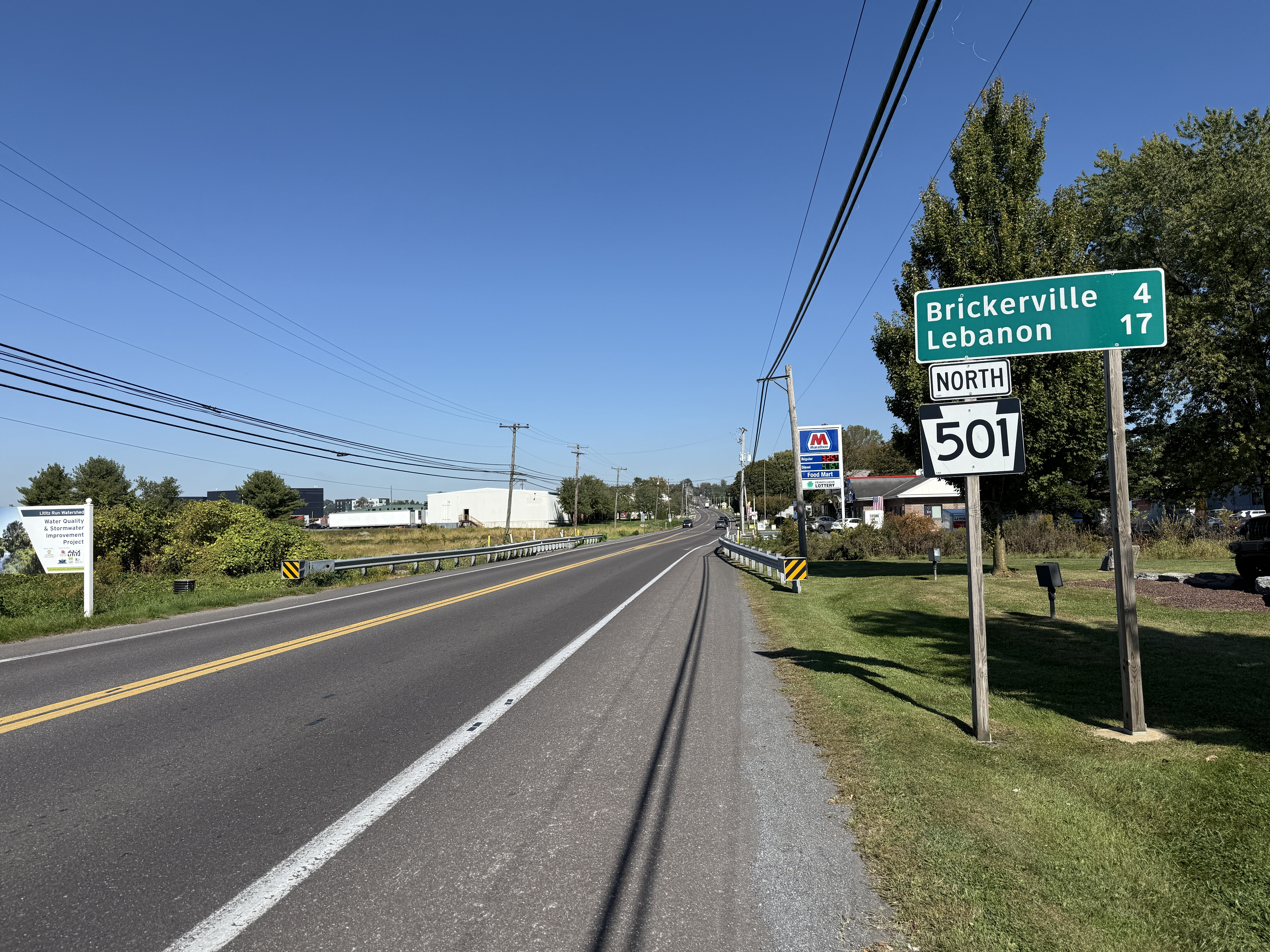
PA 501 northbound in Warwick Township

By 1946, PA 501 was extended north from Myerstown to US 22 (which had replaced PA 43) in Bethel, replacing the entire length of PA 243. The remainder of the road between Bethel and Pine Grove was paved by 1950. By 1953, the route was extended north to a new alignment of US 22 (which also now carries I-78) north of Bethel. By 1960, the southern terminus of PA 501 was cut back to its current location, eliminating a concurrency with US 222. On November 19, 1964, plans were proposed that would have built an interchange with the Pennsylvania Turnpike near Myerstown. This never occurred. PA 501 was extended north to PA 895 near Pine Grove by 1966.

In 1970, plans were made for a realignment of PA 501 in Schaefferstown to bypass the community. The route of PA 501 through Schaefferstown saw heavy traffic and noise from trucks, with frequent accidents. On July 1, 1970, a public meeting was held, with three proposed routes presented. At the time, construction was expected to begin in 1971 provided funding was available. Plans for the PA 501 realignment resurfaced in 2010. Prior to the realignment, the route entered the community from the south on Carpenter Street and turned west to run concurrent with PA 419/PA 897 on Main Street before heading north along its current routing. The PA 501 realignment project cost $10.4 million. On September 2, 2010, a court ruling was made overturning a decision that prevented farmland from being taken to construct the road. Construction on the bypass began in summer 2011. The realignment was originally expected to be completed in April 2013 but was pushed back due to utility relocation issues. The new alignment of PA 501 in Schaefferstown opened to traffic on September 9, 2013.

== Major intersections ==
County	Location	mi	km	Destinations	Notes
Lancaster	Manheim Township	0.000	0.000	US 222 (Lititz Pike / Oregon Pike)	Southern terminus; southern end of US 222 concurrency southbound
Lancaster	Manheim Township	0.548– 0.618	0.882– 0.995	US 30 to PA 283 west – York, Harrisburg, Philadelphia	Interchange; northern end of US 222 concurrency southbound
Lancaster	Manheim Township	2.806	4.516	PA 722 west (Petersburg Road)	Southern end of PA 722 concurrency
Lancaster	Manheim Township	3.223	5.187	PA 722 east (East Oregon Road)	Northern end of PA 722 concurrency
Lancaster	Lititz	6.636	10.680	PA 772 west (West Orange Street)	Southern end of PA 772 concurrency
Lancaster	Lititz	6.752	10.866	PA 772 east (East Main Street)	Northern end of PA 772 concurrency
Lancaster	Elizabeth Township	11.758	18.923	US 322 – Cornwall, Ephrata	
Lebanon	Heidelberg Township	17.463	28.104	PA 419 / PA 897 (Heidelberg Avenue) – Cornwall, Lebanon, Kleinfeltersville	
Lebanon	Myerstown	23.238	37.398	US 422 (West Lincoln Avenue) – Lebanon, Reading	
Berks	Bethel Township	31.030– 31.132	49.938– 50.102	I-78 / US 22 – Harrisburg, Allentown	Exit 13 on I-78; diamond interchange
Schuylkill	Pine Grove Township	38.695	62.274	PA 895 (Rock Road) to I-81 / PA 125 – Pine Grove, Deer Lake	Northern terminus
1.000 mi = 1.609 km; 1.000 km = 0.621 mi: Concurrency terminus
