= Pennsylvania Route 419 =

State highway in Pennsylvania, US

Pennsylvania Route 419

Route information
- Maintained by PennDOT
- Length: 28.109 mi (45.237 km)
- Tourist routes: Lebanon Cornwall Scenic Byway

Major junctions
- South end: US 322 in West Cornwall Township
- PA 72 in West Cornwall Township; PA 897 in Schaefferstown; PA 501 in Schaefferstown; US 422 in Womelsdorf; I-78 / US 22 in Bethel Township
- North end: PA 183 in Bethel Township

Location
- Country: United States
- State: Pennsylvania
- Counties: Lebanon, Berks

Highway system
- Pennsylvania State Route System; Interstate; US; State; Scenic; Legislative
| ← PA 418 | → PA 420 |
| ← PA 482 | PA 483 | → PA 484 |

Pennsylvania Route 419 (PA 419) is a state highway in the U.S. state of Pennsylvania. The route runs from U.S. Route 322 (US 322) in West Cornwall Township, Lebanon County north to PA 183 in Bethel Township, Berks County. The route heads east from US 322 through Quentin and Cornwall to Schaefferstown, where it turns east and passes through Newmanstown. PA 419 enters Berks County and passes through Womelsdorf, where it comes to a junction with US 422. From the route, the route continues north and passes through Rehrersburg and has an interchange with Interstate 78 (I-78)/US 22 near Schubert before coming to its northern terminus. PA 419 is a two-lane undivided road its entire length and passes through rural areas. The portion of the route in Lebanon County is designated the Lebanon Cornwall Scenic Byway, a Pennsylvania Scenic Byway.

What is now PA 419 was designated as part of PA 5 between Quentin and Cornwall and part of PA 83 between Rehrersburg and north of Schubert in 1927. A year later, PA 483 was designated between US 22/PA 3 (now US 422) in Womelsdorf and PA 83 in Rehrersburg while PA 72 was designated concurrent with PA 5 between Quentin and Cornwall. US 322 replaced PA 5 in the 1930s. PA 483 was decommissioned in the 1940s. By 1960, PA 72 was shifted off the road between Quentin and Cornwall while PA 83 was moved off the road between Rehrersburg and Schubert, with US 322 removed from the road in 1963. PA 419 was designated by 1966 onto its current alignment.

== Route description ==
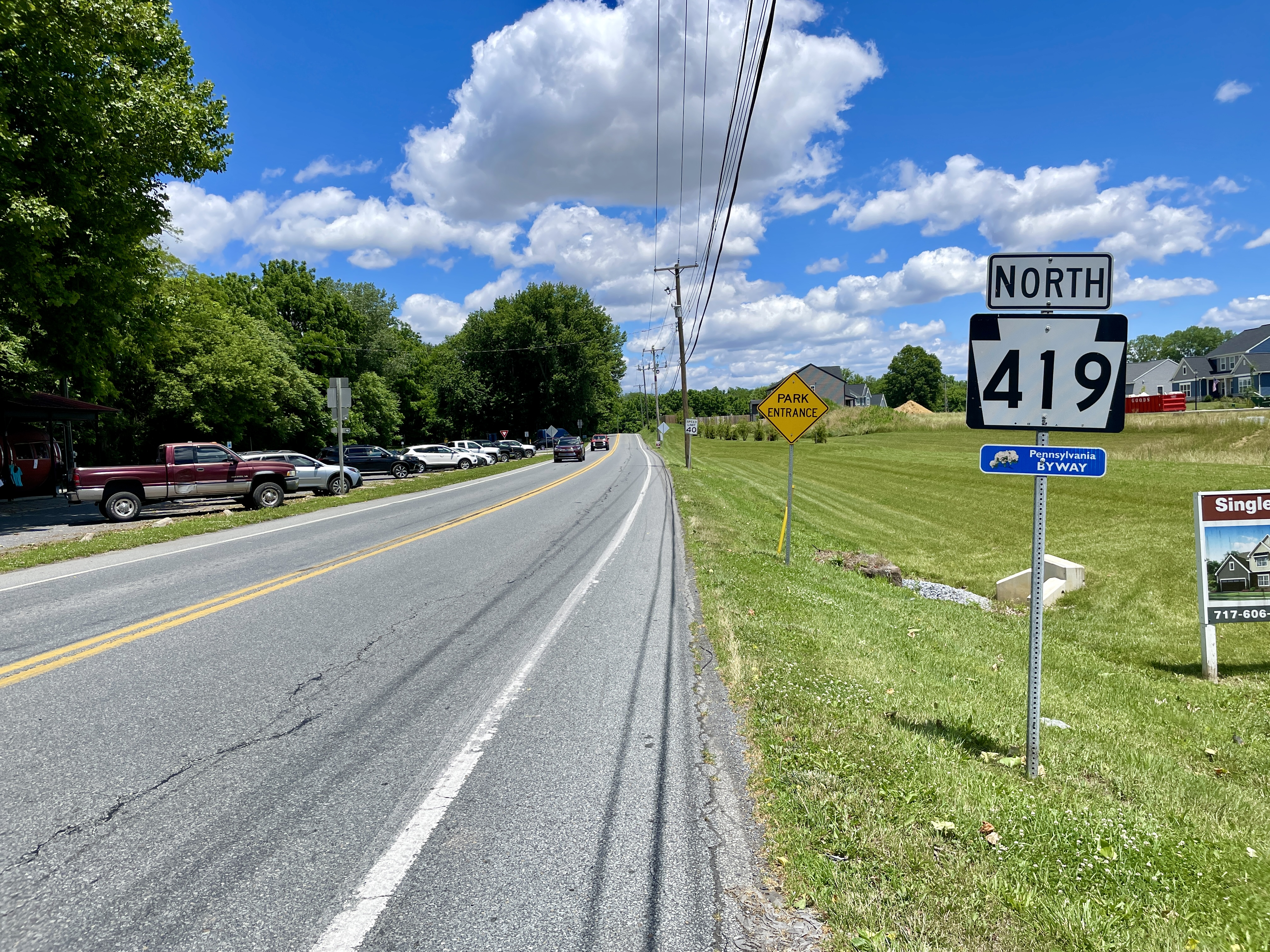
PA 419 northbound in Cornwall

PA 419 begins at an intersection with US 322 (Horseshoe Pike) in West Cornwall Township, Lebanon County, heading east on two-lane undivided Main Street. The route passes through the residential community of Quentin and comes to an intersection with PA 72 (Quentin Road). The road continues into the borough of Cornwall and becomes Freeman Drive, running through a mix of farmland and woodland with some homes. PA 419 crosses the Lebanon Valley Rail Trail before it turns to the northeast and enters South Lebanon Township, where the name becomes Schaeffer Road and it continues east through agricultural areas with occasional development in the southeastern portion of Lebanon County, which is home to an Amish community. The route enters Heidelberg Township and passes through the community of Buffalo Springs before it passes to the north of Keller Brothers Airport. The road runs through more rural land with some homes before it reaches the community of Schaefferstown. At this point, PA 419 comes to an intersection with PA 897 (South 5th Avenue), with that route turning east to join PA 419 in a concurrency along Heidelberg Avenue. The two routes cross PA 501 (Stiegel Pike) and continue east through residential areas with some businesses. PA 419 splits from PA 897 by turning north onto North Market Street and passes more homes before leaving Schaefferstown. The road heads northeast into farmland with some trees and homes, crossing into Millcreek Township and becoming an unnamed road. The route curves east through more agricultural land before turning northeast again and passing through the communities of Millbach Springs and Millbach. PA 419 heads into the community of Newmanstown, where it is called Main Street and is lined with homes. After leaving Newmanstown, the road comes to a bridge over Norfolk Southern's Harrisburg Line. In Lebanon County, PA 419 is known as the Lebanon Cornwall Scenic Byway, a Pennsylvania Scenic Byway.

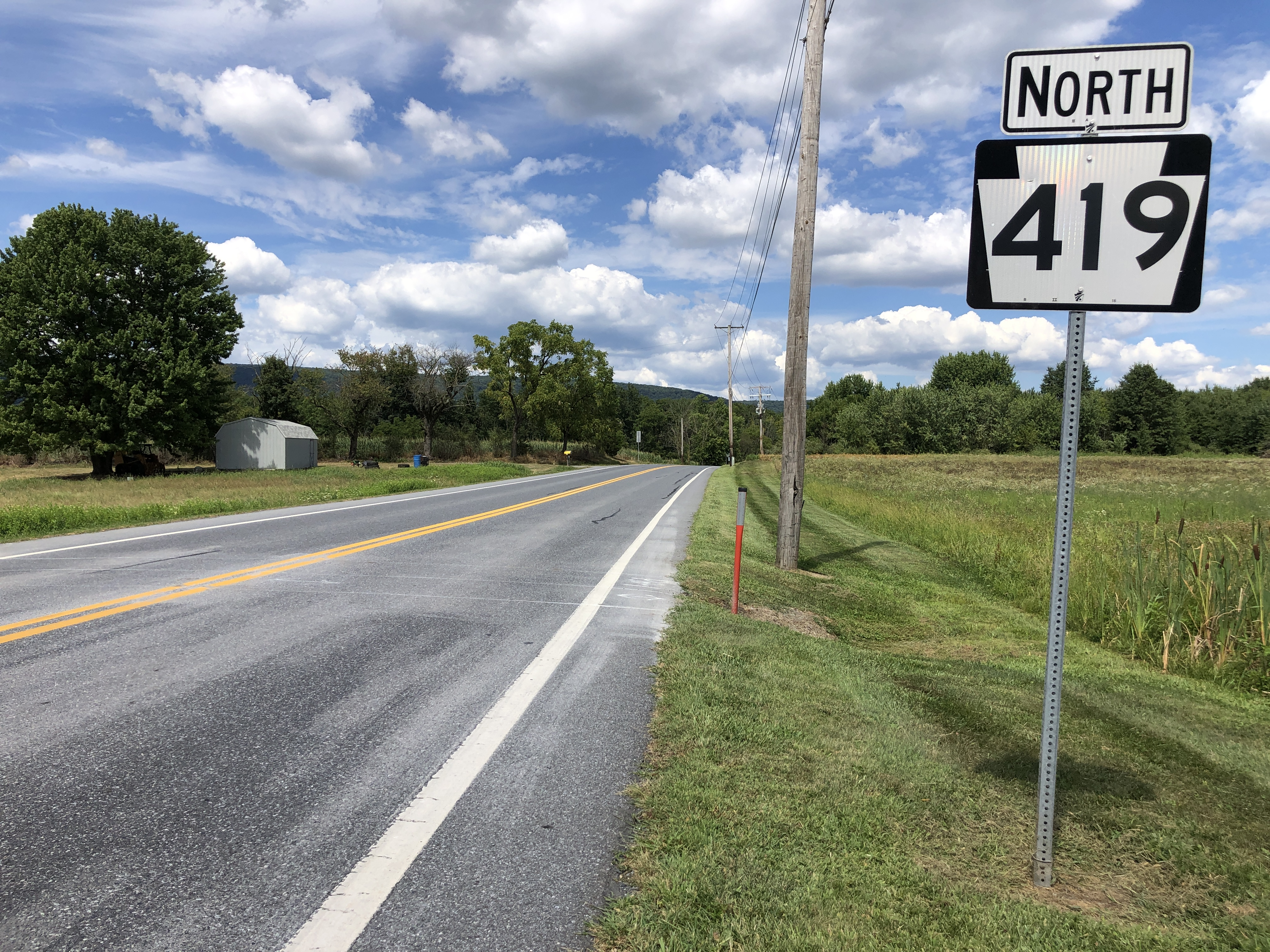
PA 419 northbound past Old Route 22 in Bethel Township

PA 419 enters Heidelberg Township in Berks County and heads northeast through farmland on Newmanstown Road. The route turns north and crosses into the borough of Womelsdorf, where it becomes South 2nd Street and is lined with homes. PA 419 turns west onto West High Street for a block before it heads north along North 3rd Street. The route runs past residences and commercial establishments before it reaches a junction with US 422 (Conrad Weiser Parkway) in an area of businesses. Past this intersection, the road becomes Rehrersburg Road and leaves Womelsdorf for Heidelberg Township again before it crosses the Tulpehocken Creek into Marion Township. PA 419 continues through agricultural areas before it curves northwest into a mix of farmland and woodland with some homes. The road enters Tulpehocken Township and passes through the community of Host, continuing north-northwest. Near Rehrersburg, the route splits from Rehrersburg Road by turning north onto Four Point Road and heading through farmland with some trees and homes. PA 419 crosses Little Swatara Creek into Bethel Township and intersects Old Route 22 before it reaches an interchange with I-78/US 22 near a few businesses. Past this interchange, the road passes near farm fields and homes in Schubert before it enters forested areas at the base of Blue Mountain. PA 419 curves northeast and reaches its northern terminus at an intersection with PA 183.

== History ==
Pennsylvania Route 483
- Location: Womelsdorf – Rehrersburg
- Existed: 1928–1940s

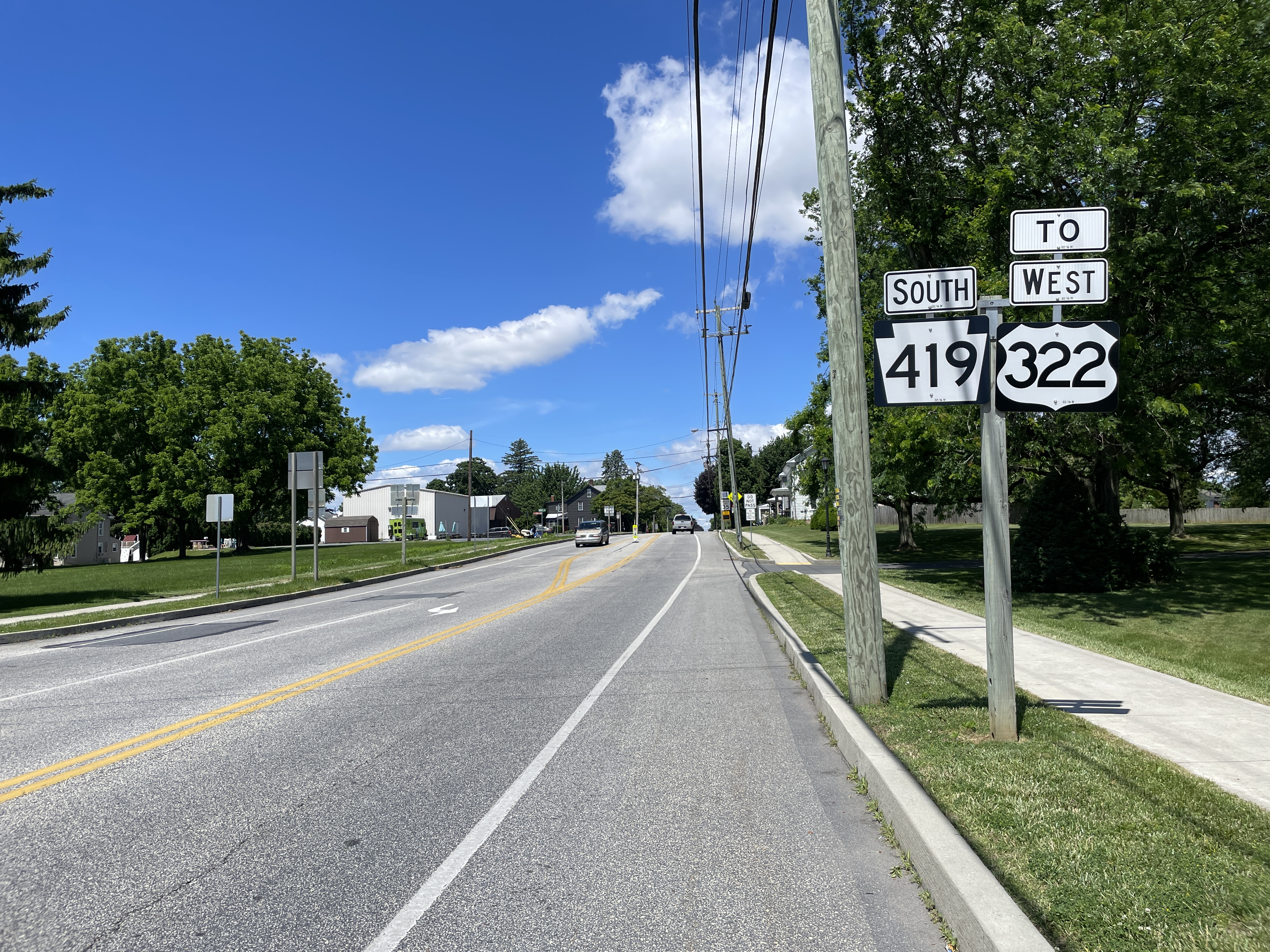
PA 419 southbound past PA 72 in Quentin

When routes were first legislated in Pennsylvania in 1911, the present-day route of PA 419 was not designated as a legislative route. At this time, the roadway was paved in Millcreek Township, while an unpaved road continued south to Schaefferstown and north to Legislative Route 149 in Womelsdorf. The portion of the route between Quentin and Cornwall was designated as part of PA 5 and the current route north of Rehrersburg was designated as part of PA 83 in 1927. In 1928, PA 483 was designated to run from US 22/PA 3 (now US 422) in Womelsdorf north to PA 83 in Rehrersburg along unpaved Rehrersburg Road. At this time, the segment of PA 5/PA 72 between Quentin and Cornwall and the segment of PA 83 between Rehrersburg and north of Schubert, along with the unnumbered road between Schaefferstown and Womelsdorf, was paved. The unnumbered road between Rexmont and Schaefferstown was unpaved. By 1930, the road between Cornwall and Schaefferstown along with the entire length of PA 483 were paved. In the 1930s, US 322 replaced the PA 5 designation that ran concurrent with PA 72 between Quentin and Cornwall. The PA 483 designation between US 422 in Womelsdorf and PA 83 in Rehrersburg was decommissioned in the 1940s.

By 1960, PA 83 was shifted east to a new alignment through Strausstown, leaving the road between Rehrersburg and north of Schubert unnumbered. Also by this time, PA 72 was removed from US 322 between Quentin and Cornwall after it was moved to a new alignment between Quentin and Lebanon. In 1963, US 322 was shifted to bypass Cornwall along with PA 72, removing it from the road that ran between Quentin and Cornwall. PA 419 was designated by 1966 to run from US 322 in Quentin east and north to PA 183 north of Schubert along its current alignment. PA 419 and PA 897 previously ran concurrent with PA 501 in Schaefferstown between Stiegel Pike and Carpenter Street. In 2013, PA 501 was shifted to bypass Schaefferstown to the west along a new alignment, eliminating the concurrency with PA 419 and PA 897.

== Major intersections ==
| County | Location | mi | km | Destinations | Notes |
|---|---|---|---|---|---|
| Lebanon | West Cornwall Township | 0.000 | 0.000 | US 322 (Horseshoe Pike) – Ephrata, Hershey | Southern terminus |
| Lebanon | West Cornwall Township | 0.626 | 1.007 | PA 72 (Quentin Road) to US 322 east – Lebanon, Manheim | |
| Lebanon | Heidelberg Township | 7.873 | 12.670 | PA 897 north (South 5th Avenue) – Lebanon | Southern terminus of PA 897 concurrency |
| Lebanon | Heidelberg Township | 8.034 | 12.929 | PA 501 (Stiegel Pike) – Myerstown, Brickerville | |
| Lebanon | Heidelberg Township | 8.650 | 13.921 | PA 897 south (Heidelberg Avenue) – Cocalico | Northern terminus of PA 897 concurrency |
| Berks | Womelsdorf | 16.998 | 27.356 | US 422 (Conrad Weiser Parkway) – Lebanon, Reading | |
| Berks | Bethel Township | 26.204 | 42.171 | I-78 / US 22 – Harrisburg, Allentown | Exit 17 (I-78/US 22) |
| Berks | Bethel Township | 28.109 | 45.237 | PA 183 – Cressona, Pottsville, Strausstown | Northern terminus |
1.000 mi = 1.609 km; 1.000 km = 0.621 mi: Concurrency terminus
