= South Mountain Railroad =

The South Mountain Railroad was an American railroad which operated in Pennsylvania.

== History ==
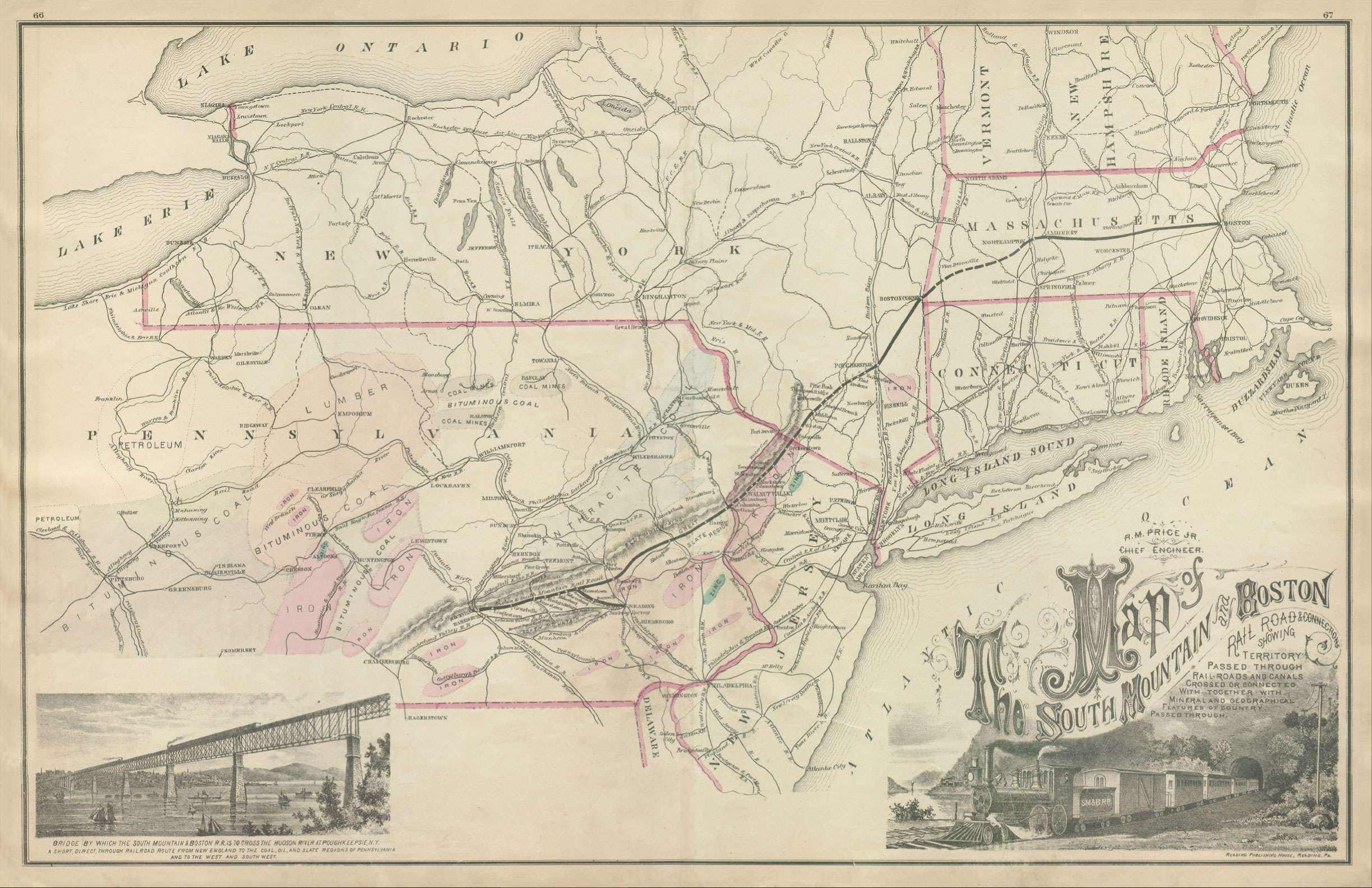
1876 map of the line and its extension to Boston

The railroad was incorporated May 5, 1854 by a group of largely local investors. It was to run from Harrisburg to Jonestown, from thence along the south side of Blue Mountain to Rehrersburg and to Hamburg. The name was changed to the Harrisburg and Hamburg Railroad on March 17, 1859, but was changed back to "South Mountain Railroad" on May 21, 1873. On April 11, 1868, the South Side Railroad was incorporated to connect the South Mountain Railroad, at the border of Berks and Lehigh Counties (near Hamburg) to the Delaware River, via Lehigh, Moore, or Plainfield Townships in Northampton County.

Around 1872, these lines were taken over to become part of the Poughkeepsie Bridge Route. Grading began on the South Mountain Railroad between Rockville and Linglestown, and the corporate enrollment tax was paid for the South Side Railroad in 1873. However, the collapse of the Bridge Route plans in the Panic of 1873 brought work to a halt. On February 16, 1874, President William H. Bell announced that the company would also build a branch from Strausstown to Reading, via Bernville, and claimed that two-thirds of the line between Harrisburg and Strausstown was complete. However, the financial climate made it impossible to raise significant funds. Further work appears to have been performed, sporadically, by local interests, who hoped to connect the town of Fredericksburg with the Lebanon and Tremont Branch of the Philadelphia and Reading Railroad at Jonestown. Bridge piers were erected for the crossing of Swatara Creek, a cut was excavated to the north of Jonestown, and some culverts were constructed and grading done on the route to Fredericksburg. However, the company was forced to auction off its personal property in October 1877, and in February 1880, "the rights-of-way, leases and passenger cars were sold." The company does not appear to have laid track or operated. The remaining assets of the company were sold to the Pennsylvania and New England Railroad later that year. Another account claims that the charter was sold to the Harrisburg and New England Railroad at a sheriff's sale on November 30, 1888.

Despite its financial collapse and dismantling, the shell of the company was reorganized on August 8, 1893 as the Blue Mountain Railroad, on August 12, 1901, as the Harrisburg and South Mountain Railroad, which was inactive by 1912.

While the piers and grading west of Fredericksburg are still visible, the cut through Jonestown was used as a garbage dump and later filled to form Swatara Drive. LIDAR and terrain maps can show various parts of the railroad as far westward as Susquehanna Township in Dauphin county, and an old railbed in Bernville can be visible following Northkill Creek on the opposite side of Route 183.
