= Bethel Township, Berks County, Pennsylvania =

Township in Pennsylvania, US

Bethel Township
- Township
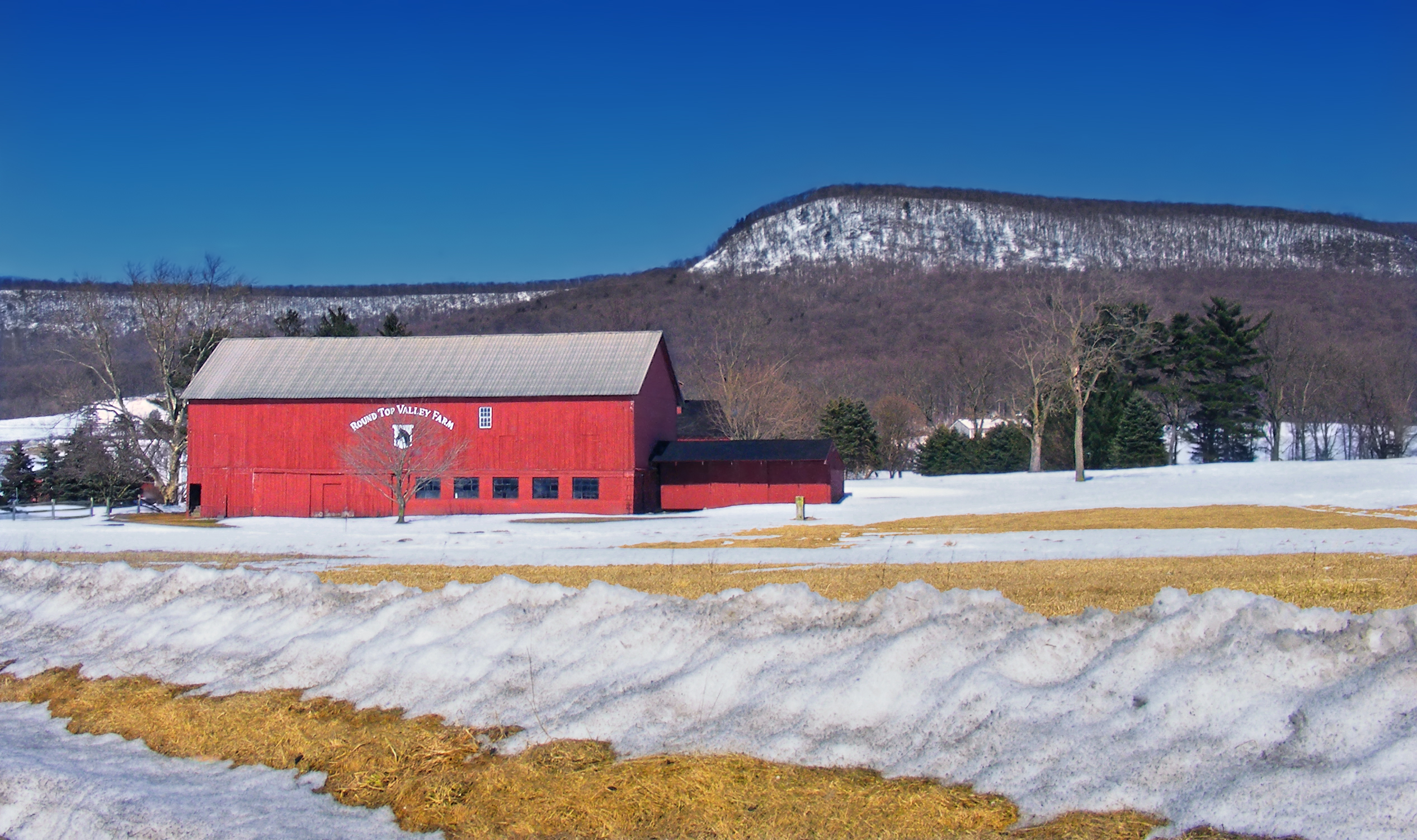
- Round Top Valley Farm in Bethel Township

- Seal

- Location of Bethel Township in Pennsylvania Bethel Township (the United States)
- Coordinates: 40°30′03″N 76°22′35″W
- Country: United States
- State: Pennsylvania
- County: Berks

Area
  - Total: 42.33 sq mi (109.64 km^{2})
  - Land: 42.22 sq mi (109.34 km^{2})
  - Water: 0.12 sq mi (0.30 km^{2})
- Elevation: 741 ft (226 m)
- Highest elevation (Blue Mountain, about 2 miles northeast of Shikellamy Scout Camp): 1,680 ft (510 m)
- Lowest elevation (Little Swatara Creek where it flows out of township): 430 ft (130 m)

Population (2020)
  - Total: 4,072 ▼
  - Estimate (2021): 4,066
  - Density: 97.6/sq mi (37.69/km^{2})
- Time zone: UTC-5 (EST)
  - Summer (DST): UTC-4 (EDT)
- Area codes: 610, 717
- FIPS code: 42-011-06008
- Website: betheltwp.org

Bethel Township is a township in Berks County, Pennsylvania, United States. The population was 4,072 at the 2020 census.

== History ==
Spannuth Mill was listed on the National Register of Historic Places in 1990.

== Geography ==
According to the U.S. Census Bureau, the township has a total area of 42.2 square miles (109 km^{2}), of which 42.2 square miles (109 km^{2}) is land and 0.04 square miles (0.10 km^{2}) (0.05%) is water. It is drained by the Little Swatara Creek into the Swatara Creek and the Susquehanna River. Its natural northern boundary is Blue Mountain. Its villages include Bethel, Crosskill Mills (also in Tulpehocken Township,) Frystown, Grimes, Meckville, and Schubert.

=== Adjacent townships ===
- Upper Tulpehocken Township (east)
- Tulpehocken Township (south)
- Bethel Township, Lebanon County (west)
- Pine Grove Township, Schuylkill County (northwest)
- Washington Township, Schuylkill County (north)
- Wayne Township, Schuylkill County (northeast)

== Recreation ==
Portions of the Pennsylvania State Game Lands Number 80 and Number 110, through which passes the Appalachian National Scenic Trail, are located along the northern border of the township.

== Demographics ==
Historical population
Census	Pop.	Note	%±
1980	3,312		—
1990	3,576		8.0%
2000	4,166		16.5%
2010	4,112		−1.3%
2020	4,072		−1.0%
2021 (est.)	4,066		−0.1%
Source: US Census Bureau

As of the 2000 census, there were 4,166 people, 1,466 households, and 1,150 families residing in the township. The population density was 98.7 inhabitants per square mile (38.1/km^{2}). There were 1,551 housing units at an average density of 36.7 per square mile (14.2/km^{2}). The racial makeup of the township was 97.36% White, 0.55% African American, 0.10% Native American, 0.65% Asian, 0.77% from other races, and 0.58% from two or more races. Hispanic or Latino people of any race were 1.56% of the population.

There were 1,466 households, out of which 35.1% had children under the age of 18 living with them, 68.1% were married couples living together, 5.9% had a female householder with no husband present, and 21.5% were non-families. 17.6% of all households were made up of individuals, and 6.5% had someone living alone who was 65 years of age or older. The average household size was 2.84 and the average family size was 3.22.

In the township, the population was spread out, with 27.2% under the age of 18, 7.5% from 18 to 24, 30.1% from 25 to 44, 24.6% from 45 to 64, and 10.6% who were 65 years of age or older. The median age was 36 years. For every 100 females, there were 105.9 males. For every 100 females age 18 and over, there were 104.4 males.

The median income for a household in the township was $47,015, and the median income for a family was $52,115. Males had a median income of $32,439 versus $23,929 for females. The per capita income for the township was $18,116. About 4.1% of families and 6.5% of the population were below the poverty line, including 9.4% of those under age 18 and 6.7% of those age 65 or over.

== Transportation ==
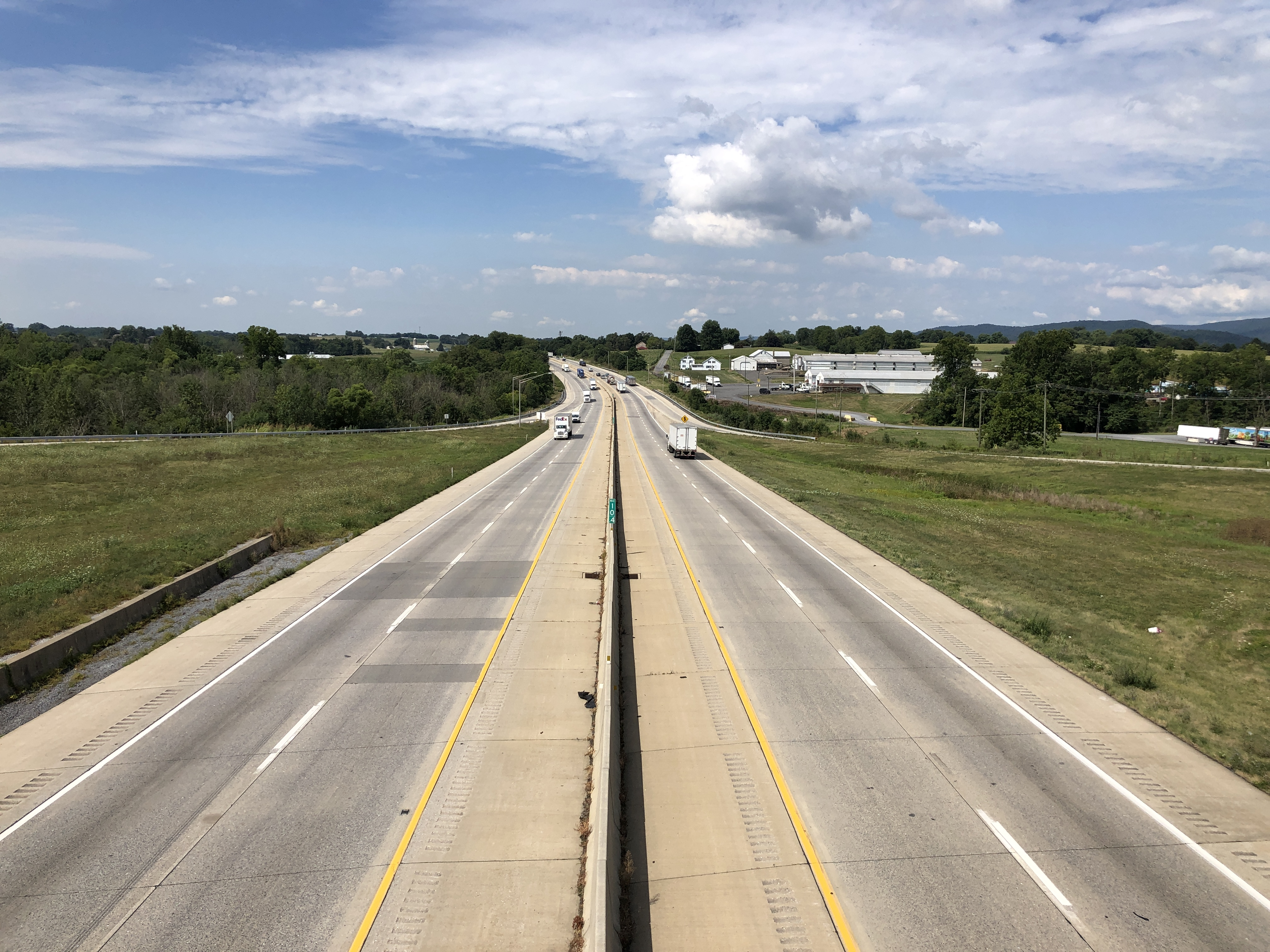
I-78/US 22 westbound in Bethel Township

As of 2020, there were 95.82 miles (154.21 km) of public roads in Bethel Township, of which 38.21 miles (61.49 km) were maintained by the Pennsylvania Department of Transportation (PennDOT) and 57.61 miles (92.71 km) were maintained by the township.

Bethel Township's main west-to-east route is Interstate 78/U.S. Route 22, which spans the length of the township. Interchanges within the township link it with Pennsylvania Route 645, Pennsylvania Route 501 and Pennsylvania Route 419. Pennsylvania Route 183 also serves the township, briefly passing through the northeastern corner.

== Notable person ==
- Sussel-Washington Artist, fraktur artist; the artist is anonymous, but produced a group of works associated with this community
