= Schubert, Pennsylvania =

Unincorporated community in Pennsylvania, US

Coordinates: 40°29′51″N 76°13′15″W

Schubert is a census-designated place in northeastern Bethel Township, Berks County, Pennsylvania. It is located off PA Route 419 just north of its interchange with Interstate 78 on the southern flank of Blue Mountain.

Schubert is drained by the Stone Creek south into the Little Swatara Creek. It is served by the Bethel post office, which uses ZIP Code 19507. As of the 2020 census, the population was 251.
