= Spannuth Mill =

- U.S. National Register of Historic Places
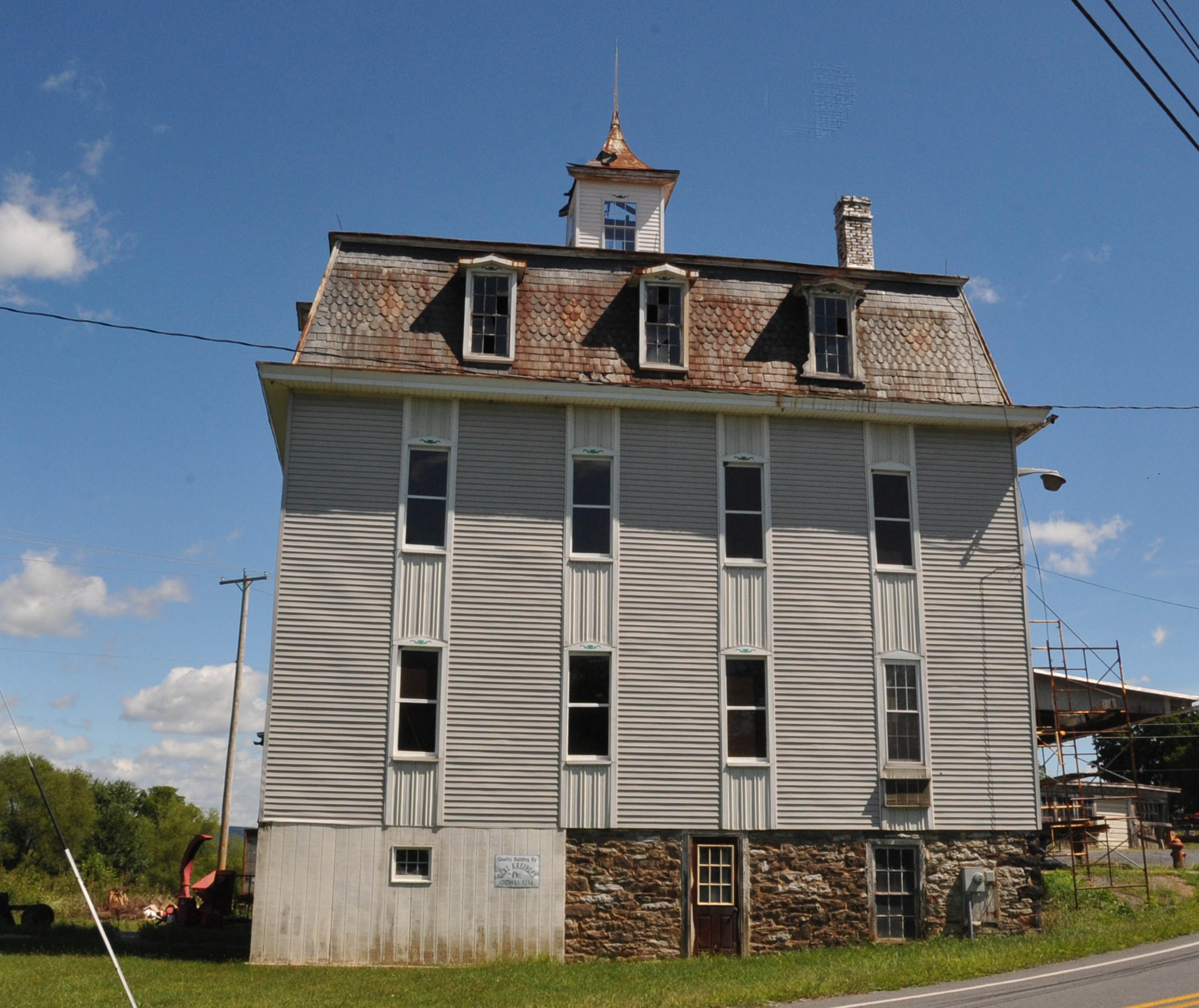

- Location within Pennsylvania Location within the United States
- Location: Junction of Frystown and Crosskill Creek Roads, Bethel Township, Pennsylvania
- Coordinates: 40°26′51″N 76°21′17″W
- Area: 2 acres (0.81 ha)
- Built: 1891
- Architectural style: Second Empire, Gristmill
- MPS: Gristmills in Berks County MPS
- NRHP reference No.: 90001631
- Added to NRHP: November 8, 1990

The Spannuth Mill, also known as the Crosskill Mill, is an historic grist mill in Bethel Township in Berks County, Pennsylvania, United States.

It was listed on the National Register of Historic Places in 1990.

== History and architectural features ==
Built in 1891, this mill is a three-story, frame building that sits on a stone foundation and measures forty feet, four inches by forty-two feet, nine inches with a fifty-foot extension. It has a mansard roof in the Second Empire style. Also located on the property is a one-story brick building that was built circa 1910. It once housed a boiler. This mill ceased operations in 1982.
