= Tulpehocken Township, Pennsylvania =

Township in Pennsylvania, US

Tulpehocken Township
- Township
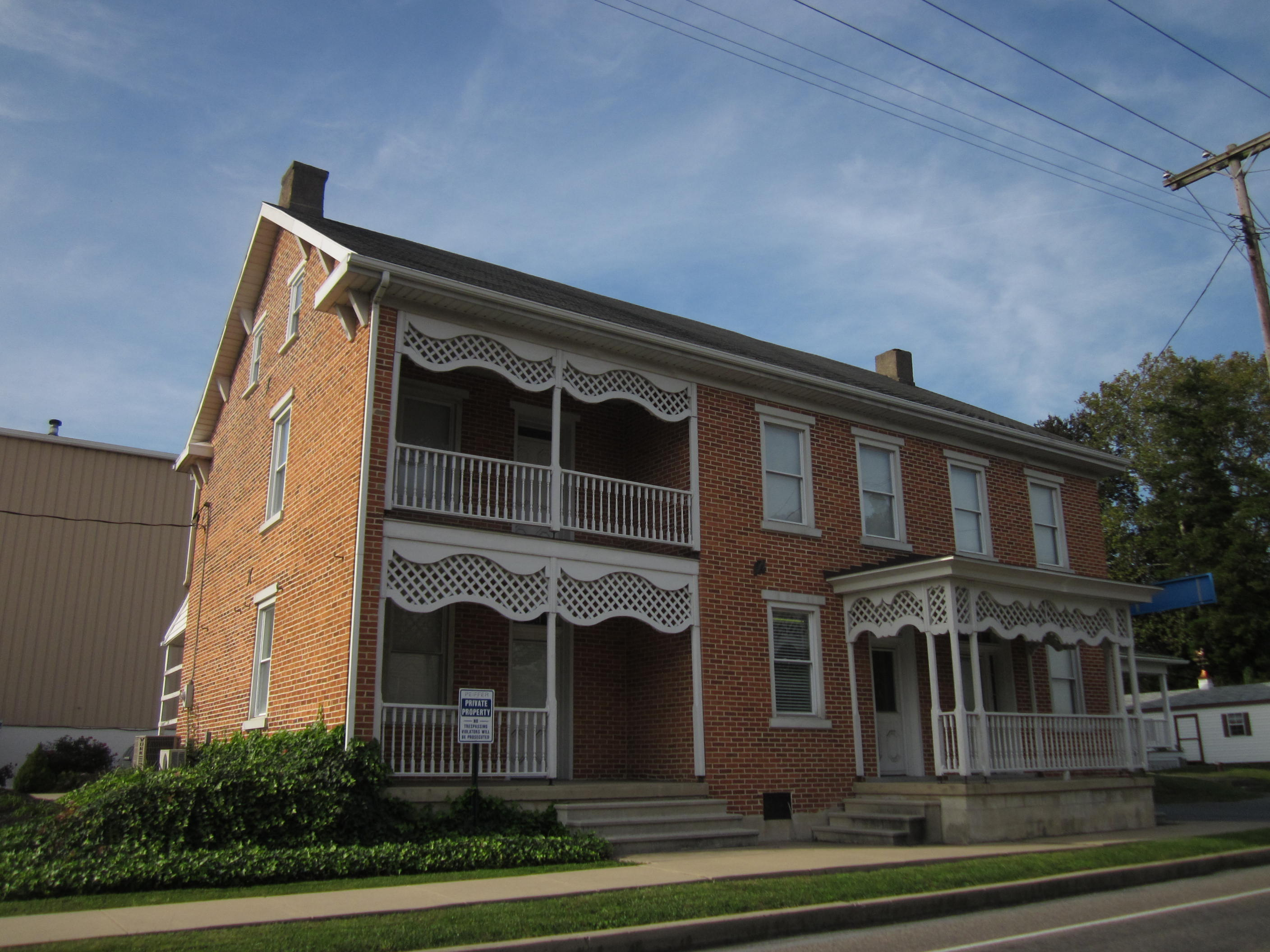
- Pennsylvania Route 501 in Mount Aetna

- Location of Tulpehocken Township in Pennsylvania Tulpehocken Township (the United States)
- Coordinates: 40°26′27″N 76°15′12″W
- Country: United States
- State: Pennsylvania
- County: Berks

Area
  - Total: 23.3 sq mi (60 km^{2})
  - Land: 23.3 sq mi (60 km^{2})
  - Water: 0.0 sq mi (0 km^{2})
- Elevation: 558 ft (170 m)

Population (2010)
  - Total: 3,274
  - Estimate (2016): 3,308
  - Density: 141.2/sq mi (54.5/km^{2})
- Time zone: UTC-5 (EST)
  - Summer (DST): UTC-4 (EDT)
- Area codes: 610, 717
- FIPS code: 42-011-77752
- Website: https://tulpytwp.org/

Tulpehocken Township is a township in Berks County, Pennsylvania, United States. The population was 3,274 at the 2010 census.

Tulpehocken is a name derived from the Lenape language, meaning "land of the turtles".

== Geography ==
According to the U.S. Census Bureau, the township has a total area of 23.3 square miles (60.3 km^{2}), all land. It contains the census-designated place of Mount Aetna and Rehrersburg.

Adjacent townships

- Bethel Township, Berks County (north)
- Upper Tulpehocken Township, Berks County (northeast)
- Jefferson Township, Berks County (east)
- Marion Township, Berks County (south)
- Jackson Township, Lebanon County (southwest)
- Bethel Township, Lebanon County (west)

== Demographics ==
Historical population
Census	Pop.	Note	%±
1980	2,569		—
1990	2,943		14.6%
2000	3,290		11.8%
2010	3,274		−0.5%
2016 (est.)	3,308		1.0%
Source: US Census Bureau

At the 2000 census there were 3,290 people, 1,007 households, and 809 families living in the township. The population density was 141.2 inhabitants per square mile (54.5/km^{2}). There were 1,052 housing units at an average density of 45.1 per square mile (17.4/km^{2}). The racial makeup of the township was 92.74% White, 3.80% African American, 0.06% Native American, 0.36% Asian, 2.28% from other races, and 0.76% from two or more races. Hispanic or Latino of any race were 3.98%.

There were 1,007 households, 41.6% had children under the age of 18 living with them, 69.4% were married couples living together, 6.7% had a female householder with no husband present, and 19.6% were non-families. 15.3% of households were made up of individuals, and 5.9% were one person aged 65 or older. The average household size was 2.97 and the average family size was 3.32.

The age distribution was 28.5% under the age of 18, 9.3% from 18 to 24, 33.6% from 25 to 44, 19.6% from 45 to 64, and 9.0% 65 or older. The median age was 34 years. For every 100 females there were 118.0 males. For every 100 females age 18 and over, there were 125.5 males.

The median household income was $45,708 and the median family income was $47,880. Males had a median income of $34,848 versus $20,387 for females. The per capita income for the township was $17,092. About 2.6% of families and 11.3% of the population were below the poverty line, including 8.3% of those under age 18 and 2.1% of those age 65 or over.

== Transportation ==
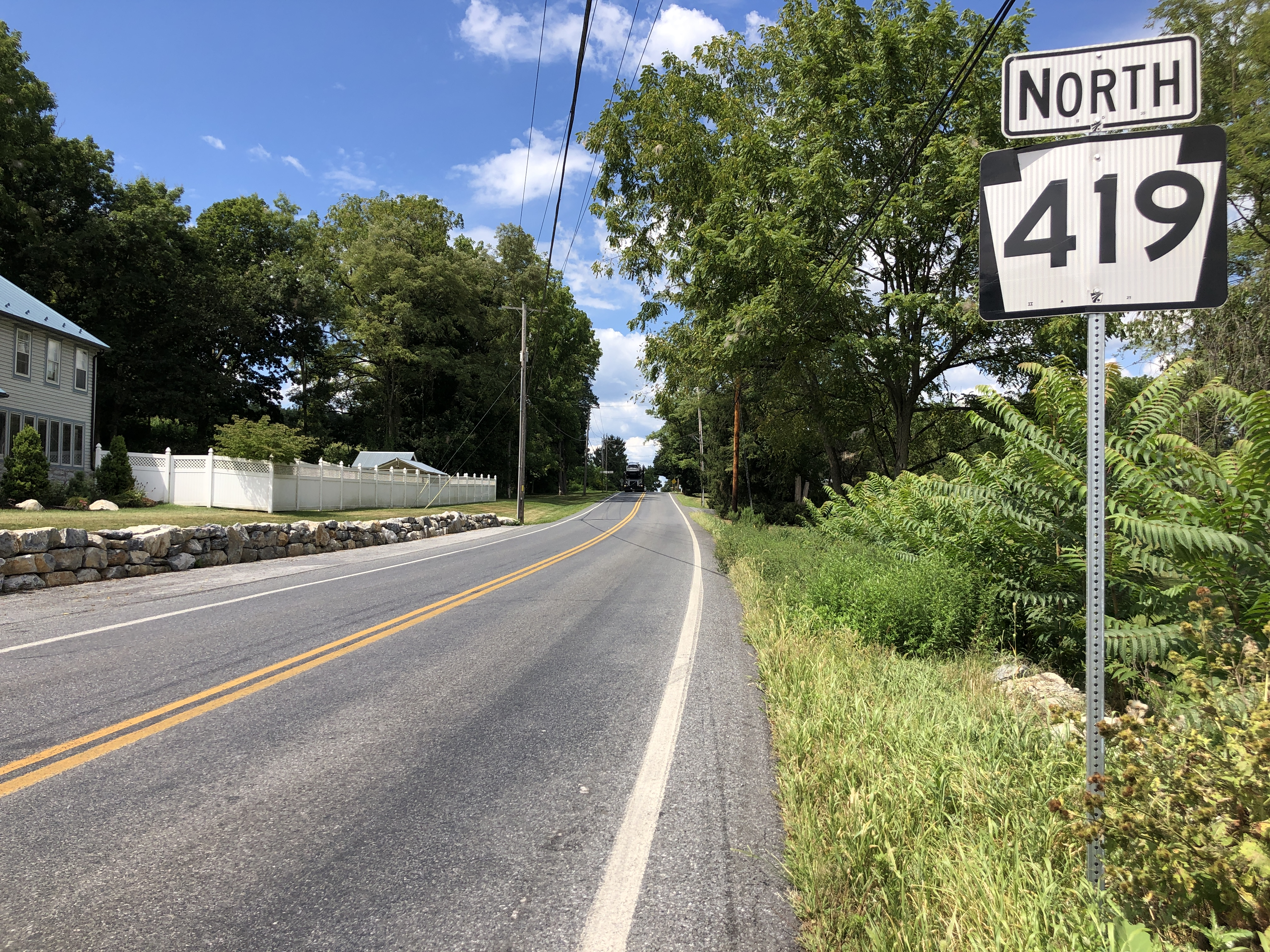
PA Route 419 North in Tulpehocken Township

As of 2020, there were 59.32 miles (95.47 km) of public roads in Tulpehocken Township, of which 16.70 miles (26.88 km) were maintained by the Pennsylvania Department of Transportation (PennDOT) and 42.62 miles (68.59 km) were maintained by the township.

Numbered highways serving Tulpehocken Township include Pennsylvania Route 419, Pennsylvania Route 501, and Pennsylvania Route 645. PA 419 follows Rehrersburg Road and Four Points Road along a north–south alignment across the eastern portion of the township. PA 501 follows Lancaster Avenue along a north–south alignment across the southwestern portion of the township. PA 645 follows Camp Swatara Road along a north–south alignment across the southwestern corner of the township.
