= Rehrersburg, Pennsylvania =

Unincorporated community in Pennsylvania, US

- Census-designated place
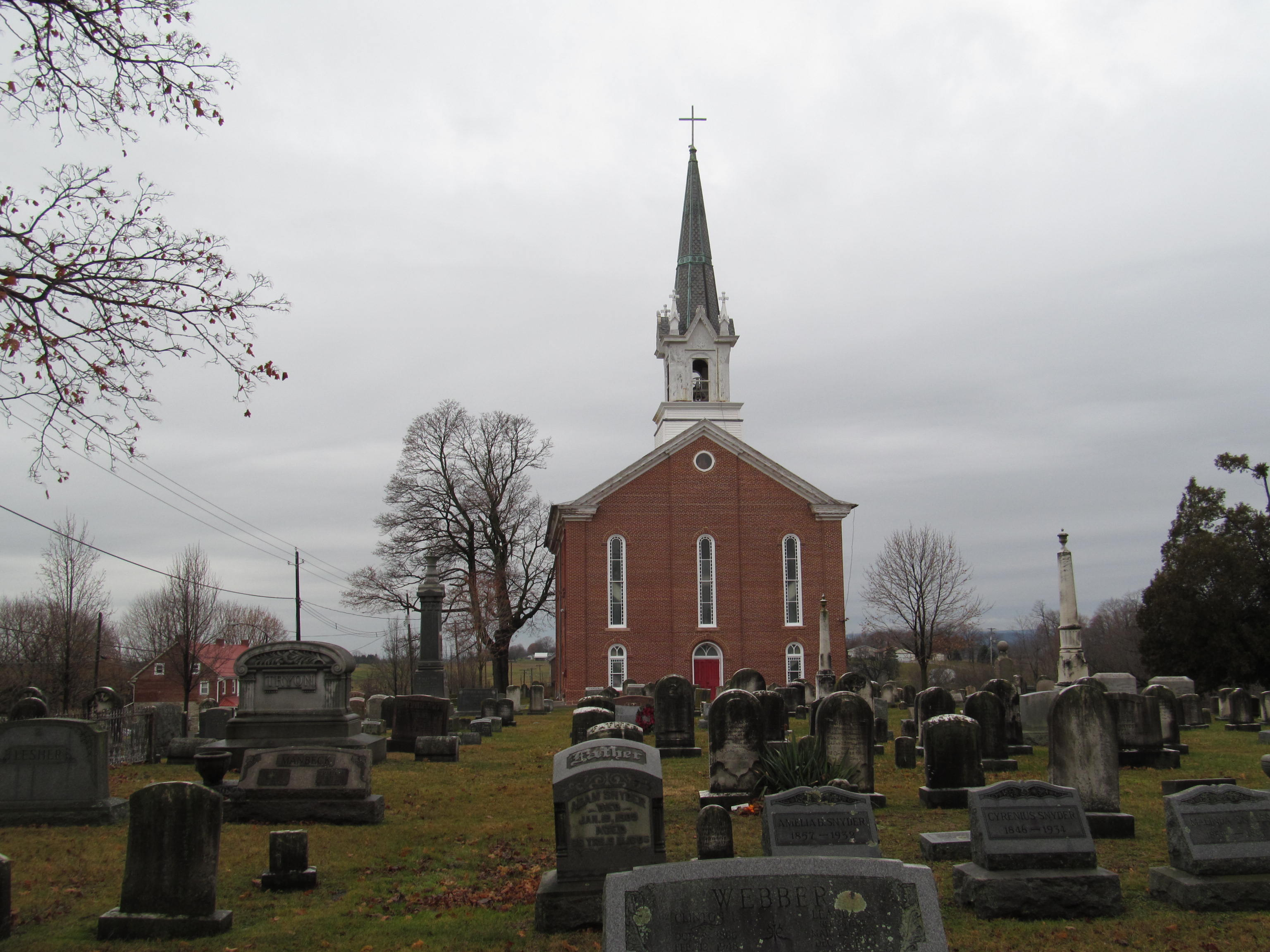

- Location within Pennsylvania Location within the United States
- Coordinates: 40°27′27″N 76°14′40″W
- Country: United States
- State: Pennsylvania
- County: Berks
- Township: Tulpehocken

Area
  - Total: 0.14 sq mi (0.36 km^{2})
  - Land: 0.14 sq mi (0.36 km^{2})
  - Water: 0 sq mi (0.00 km^{2})
- Elevation: 581 ft (177 m)

Population (2020)
  - Total: 322
  - Density: 2,320/sq mi (897/km^{2})
- Time zone: UTC-5 (Eastern (EST))
  - Summer (DST): UTC-4 (EDT)
- ZIP code: 19550
- Area code: 717
- FIPS code: 42-64056
- GNIS feature ID: 1184867

Rehrersburg is a census-designated place in Tulpehocken Township in northwestern Berks County, Pennsylvania, United States, near Pennsylvania Route 419. The community was founded on April 4, 1803, by John Jacob Rehrer. Residents celebrated the town's bicentennial on Saturday, September 20, 2003. As of the 2010 census, the population was 319 residents.

In 1818, the sixth post office in the county opened in Rehrersburg. Rehrersburg's ZIP code is 19550.

John Jacob Rehrer was the son of Johan Gottfried Rehrer and Maria Magdalena (Etschberger) Rehrer. Many descendants of the Rehrer family still reside in Rehrersburg.

== Demographics ==
Historical population
Census	Pop.	Note	%±
2020	322		—
U.S. Decennial Census

== See also ==
- South Mountain Railroad
