= Little Swatara Creek =

Tributary of Swatara Creek in Pennsylvania

Coordinates: 40.498964°N 76.204967°W

Little Swatara Creek (once known as Jackson Creek) is a 26.0-mile-long (41.8 km) tributary of Swatara Creek in southeast Pennsylvania in the United States.

The creek rises on Blue Mountain in Berks County north of Strausstown and flows west-southwest.

Little Swatara Creek joins Swatara Creek in the borough of Jonestown in Lebanon County.

== See also ==
- List of rivers of Pennsylvania
