= Snyders, Pennsylvania =

Unincorporated community in Pennsylvania, US

Snyders
- Unincorporated community
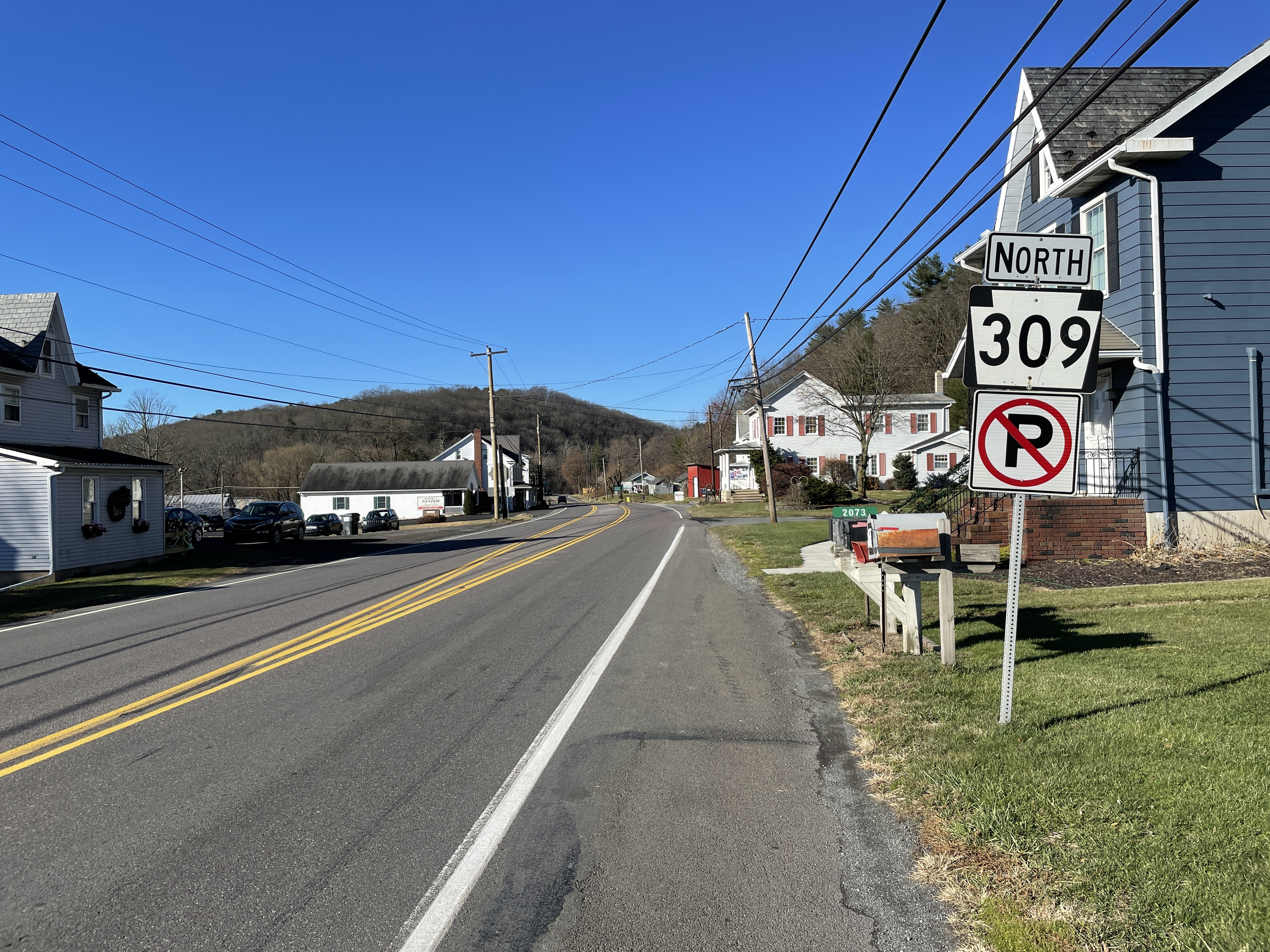
- PA 309 in Snyders

- Location within the state of Pennsylvania Snyders (the United States)
- Coordinates: 40°43′16″N 75°51′42″W
- Country: United States
- State: Pennsylvania
- County: Schuylkill
- Elevation: 650 ft (200 m)
- Time zone: UTC-5 (Eastern (EST))
  - Summer (DST): UTC-4 (EDT)
- Area code: 570
- GNIS feature ID: 1187963

Snyders is an unincorporated community in West Penn Township, Pennsylvania, United States, located at the junction of Routes 309 and 895. The Lizard Creek flows eastward through the village to the Lehigh River. Snyders lies at the northern foot of Blue Mountain and is split between the Andreas ZIP Code 18211 and the New Ringgold ZIP Code 17960. Snyders is served by the Mantzville (386) exchange in Area Code 570.
