= Pennsylvania Route 443 =

State highway in Pennsylvania, US

Pennsylvania Route 443

Route information
- Maintained by PennDOT
- Length: 80.514 mi (129.575 km)

Major junctions
- West end: SR 3009 in Middle Paxton Township
- US 22 / US 322 in Middle Paxton Township; PA 72 in Union Township; I-81 in Pine Grove Township; PA 645 in Pine Grove Township; PA 895 in Pine Grove; PA 125 in Pine Grove; PA 183 in Wayne Township; PA 61 in Schuylkill Haven; PA 895 in New Ringgold; PA 309 in West Penn Township
- East end: US 209 in Lehighton

Location
- Country: United States
- State: Pennsylvania
- Counties: Dauphin, Lebanon, Schuylkill, Carbon

Highway system
- Pennsylvania State Route System; Interstate; US; State; Scenic; Legislative
← PA 442	→ PA 445
← PA 924	PA 925	→ PA 926

Pennsylvania Route 443 (PA 443) is an 80-mile-long (130 km) east–west state highway in the US state of Pennsylvania. The western terminus is at an intersection with State Route 3009 (SR 3009) at North Front Street on the east bank of the Susquehanna River in the community of Fort Hunter in Middle Paxton Township, just west of an interchange with the U.S. Route 22 (US 22)/US 322 freeway. The eastern terminus is at US 209 in Lehighton. The route runs through rural areas in the Ridge-and-Valley Appalachians in Dauphin, Lebanon, Schuylkill, and Carbon counties, serving Fort Indiantown Gap, Pine Grove, Schuylkill Haven, Orwigsburg, New Ringgold, and South Tamaqua. PA 443 intersects several major roads, including US 22/US 322 near its western terminus, PA 72 in Union Township, Interstate 81 (I-81) near Pine Grove, PA 61 between Schuylkill Haven and Orwigsburg, and PA 309 in South Tamaqua.

PA 443 was designated in 1928 between PA 43 (Jonestown Road) in Harper Tavern and US 120 (now PA 61) in Schuylkill Haven. PA 925 was designated in 1928 to run between New Ringgold and PA 29 (now PA 309) in South Tamaqua. By 1930, the western terminus of PA 443 was moved to PA 43 west of Jonestown, heading south from Lickdale. In the 1930s, PA 443 was realigned at Green Point to run west to US 11/US 15/US 22/US 322 (North Front Street) on the east bank of the Susquehanna River, with the former alignment between Jonestown and Green Point becoming an extended PA 72, while PA 925 was extended west from New Ringgold to US 122 (now PA 61) west of Orwigsburg. In the 1940s, PA 443 was extended east from Schuylkill Haven to US 209/US 309 in Lehighton, replacing the entirety of PA 925 between Orwigsburg and South Tamaqua. North Front Street at the western terminus became unnumbered in 1977 when US 22/US 322 was shifted to a freeway a short distance to the east.

== Route description ==
=== Dauphin and Lebanon counties ===
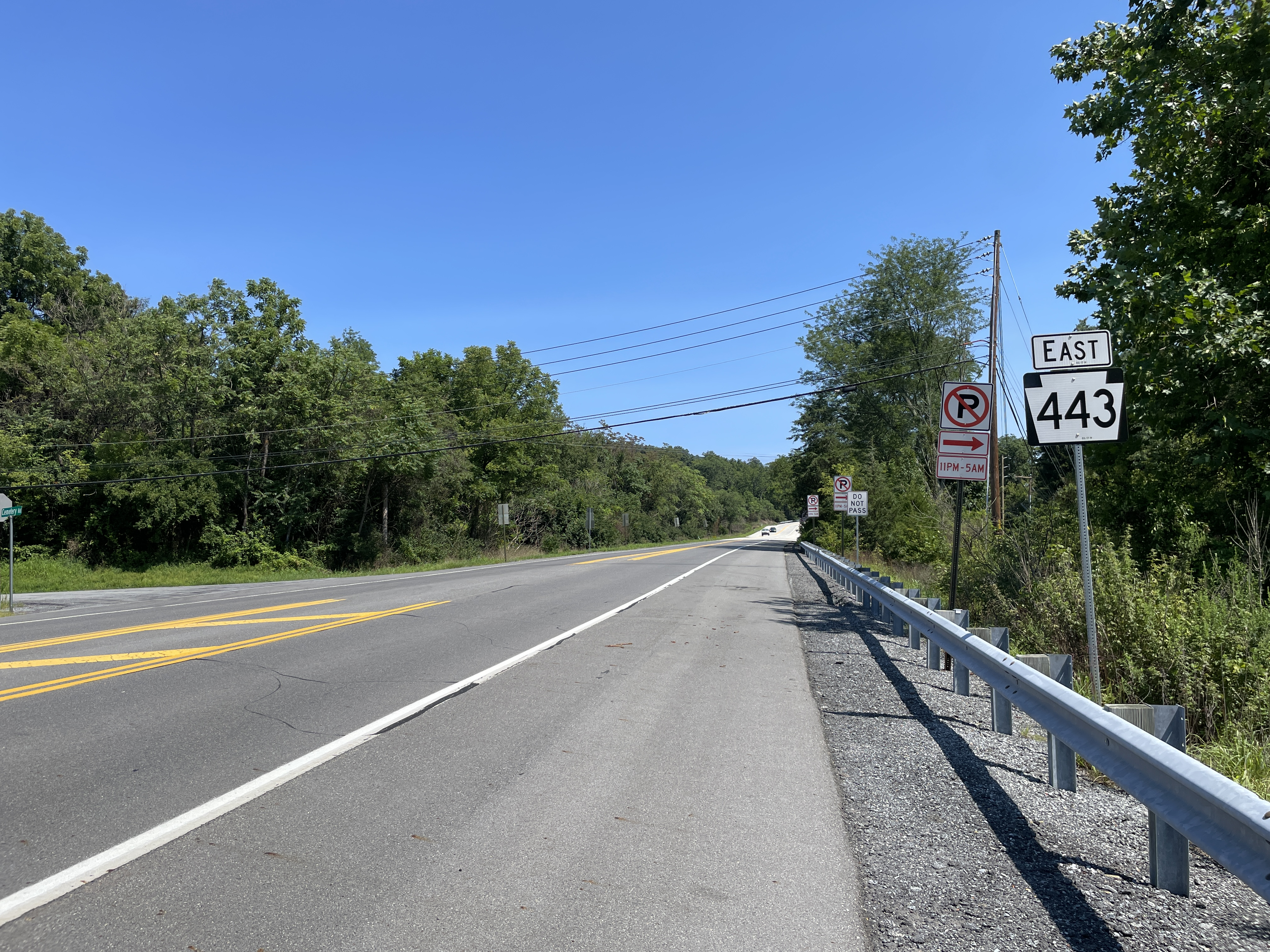
PA 443 eastbound past US 22/US 322 in Middle Paxton Township

PA 443 begins at an intersection with SR 3009 (North Front Street) on the east bank of the Susquehanna River in the community of Fort Hunter in Middle Paxton Township, Dauphin County, heading northeast on Fishing Creek Valley Road, a two-lane divided highway. Shortly after beginning, the route comes to a partial cloverleaf interchange with the US 22/US 322 freeway and passes over Norfolk Southern's Buffalo Line on a bridge. The road becomes undivided and heads through forested areas with some homes between Blue Mountain to the south and Second Mountain to the north. PA 443 passes to the north of the Boyd Big Tree Preserve Conservation Area and continues through the narrow valley with some fields and residences, crossing into West Hanover Township. The route enters East Hanover Township and becomes Mountain Road, turning south to pass through the Manada Gap in Blue Mountain in the community of Manada Gap. The road curves back to the east and runs between forested Blue Mountain to the north and farmland and homes to the south. PA 443 intersects Bow Creek Road, which heads south to provide access to I-81 and becomes PA 743 upon crossing US 22. Past this intersection, the route passes to the north of Hollywood Casino at Penn National Race Course as it continues northeast.

PA 443 crosses into East Hanover Township in Lebanon County and continues through agricultural areas with some homes to the south of Blue Mountain, gaining a second westbound lane past the Pleasant View Road intersection. The road becomes three lanes with two eastbound lanes and one westbound lane at the Mount Laurel Lane/Park Drive intersection and passes through more rural land. The route narrows to two lanes and becomes Clement Avenue, passing to the northwest of Memorial Lake State Park before it enters the grounds of the Fort Indiantown Gap military reservation. PA 443 gains a second westbound lane again and curves east before it turns northwest onto two-lane Asher Miner Road. The road heads into forests within the Indiantown Gap in Blue Mountain and forms the border between East Hanover Township to the west and Union Township to the east before it fully enters Union Township and curves northeast as Moonshine Road, leaving the grounds of the military reservation. The route continues through forests with some fields and residences between Blue Mountain to the southeast and Second Mountain to the northwest. PA 443 reaches the community of Green Point, where it crosses the Appalachian Trail and intersects the northern terminus of PA 72, turning north onto an unnamed road. The road crosses the Appalachian Trail again and forms the northwestern border of Swatara State Park, curving northeast and running through forests with some farmland and residences and passing through the community of Murray.

=== Schuylkill and Carbon counties ===
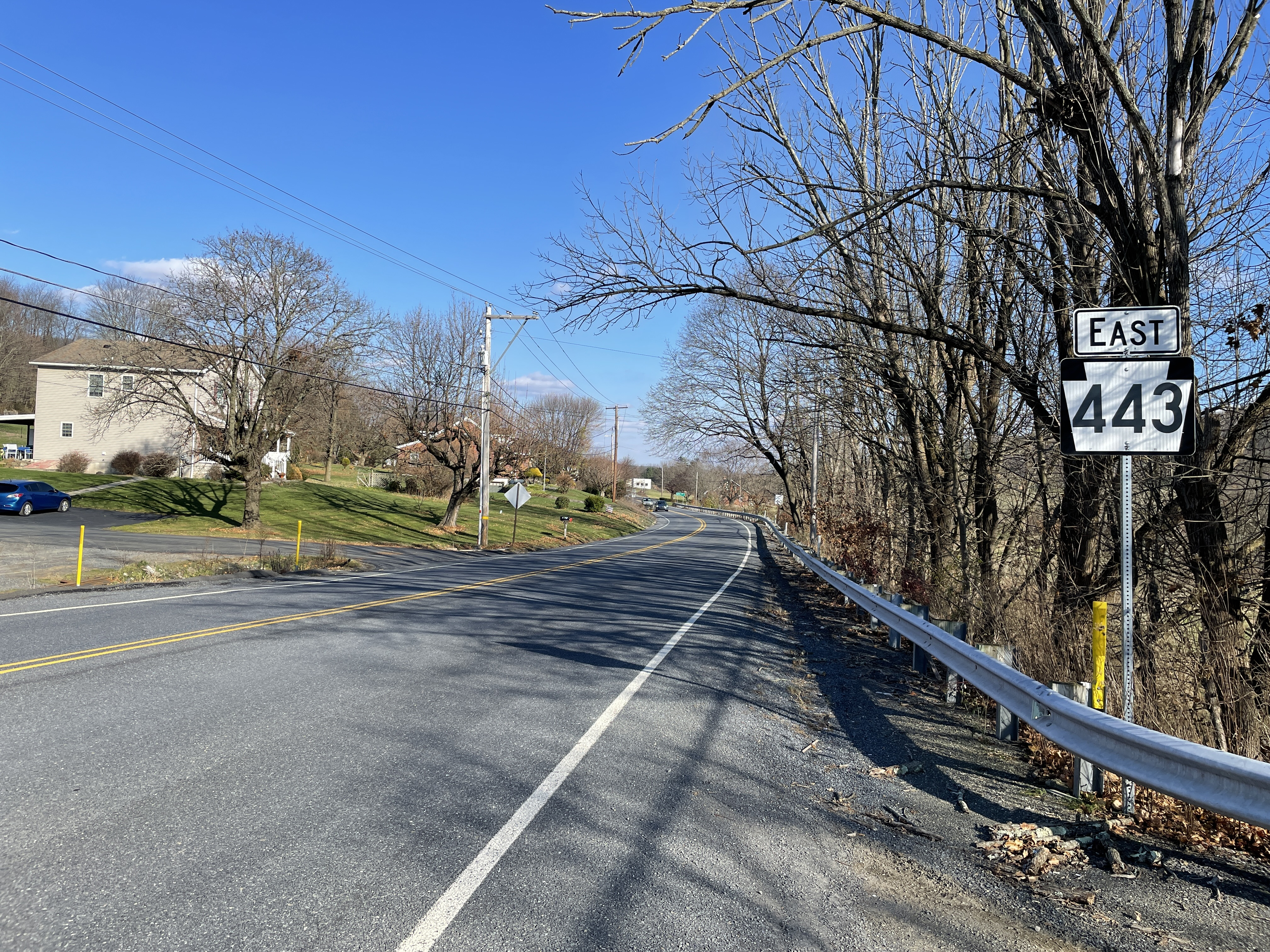
PA 443 eastbound past PA 183 in Wayne Township

The route enters Pine Grove Township in Schuylkill County and becomes Suedberg Road, running through rural areas along the northern border of Swatara State Park a short distance to the north of the Swatara Rail Trail. Along this stretch, the road passes through the communities of Suedberg and Irving. PA 443 comes to an interchange with I-81 near businesses and continues east through a mix of farm fields and woodland with some residential and commercial development, running through the community of Exmoor. The road intersects the northern terminus of PA 645 before it makes a curve to the north and enters the borough of Pine Grove. Here, the route becomes South Tulpehocken Street and is lined with homes, reaching a junction with the western terminus of PA 895. The road continues into the downtown area of Pine Grove, where it passes homes and businesses and comes to the southern terminus of PA 125. At this junction, PA 125 continues north on North Tulpehocken Street and PA 443 turns northeast onto East Pottsville Street. The route runs through residential areas before it crosses the Swatara Creek, where it becomes the border between the borough of Pine Grove to the northwest and Pine Grove Township to the southeast, passing between neighborhoods and Pine Grove Area High School to the northwest and industrial areas to the southeast. The road fully enters Pine Grove Township and becomes Pleasant Valley Road, passing through a mix of farmland and woodland with some homes and running east-northeast through the community of Pleasant Valley. PA 443 crosses into Washington Township and becomes Deturksville Road, continuing through rural areas and passing through the community of Deturksville. Farther east, the route enters Wayne Township and becomes Long Run Road, continuing through agricultural land with some homes. The road passes through the community of Friedensburg, where it passes residences and a few businesses. From here, PA 443 runs through farmland with some development and crosses PA 183.

The route heads into North Manheim Township and continues through a mix of farms and woods with some development. The road enters the borough of Schuylkill Haven and becomes Columbia Street, passing homes and a few businesses before crossing the Schuylkill River. PA 443 curves northeast and continues along Columbia Street before it turns northwest onto Parkway, a two-lane divided highway with a wide median that passes through residential areas. The route turns north onto two-lane undivided Main Street and heads through the commercial downtown of Schuylkill Haven, crossing a Reading Blue Mountain and Northern Railroad line at-grade west of the former Schuylkill Haven station. After passing through the downtown area, PA 443 turns northwest onto Dock Street and runs through residential areas. The road bends north and comes to an intersection with PA 61. At this point, PA 443 turns east for a concurrency with PA 61 on Center Avenue, continuing past homes. The road leaves Schuylkill Haven for North Manheim Township and widens into a four-lane divided highway, running through business areas and passing to the south of the Penn State Schuylkill university campus. The two routes continues east-northeast past development before PA 443 splits from PA 61 at a jughandle-controlled intersection, with PA 443 heading northeast on two-lane undivided West Market Street, passing south of Blue Mountain High School. The route passes through the community of Bohrmans Mill and runs through a mix of farmland and residential and commercial development. The road enters the borough of Orwigsburg and runs east past homes. PA 443 heads east-southeast through the downtown area, where it is a two-lane divided highway with parking spaces for two blocks and becomes East Market Street upon crossing Warren Street. The route turns north-northeast onto two-lane undivided North Washington Street and runs through residential areas. The road curves northeast and passes between homes to the northwest and fields to the southeast.

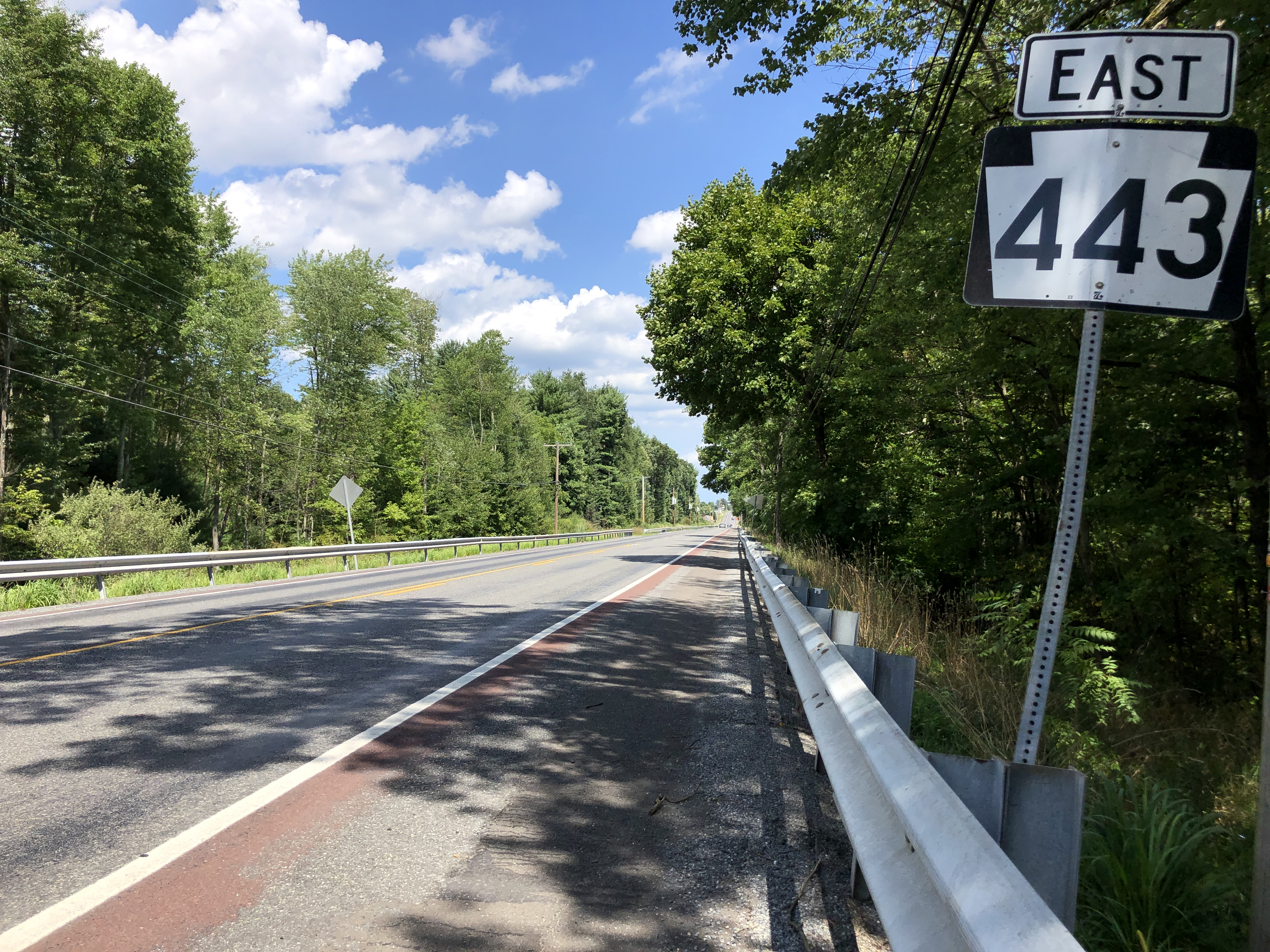
PA 443 eastbound in Mahoning Township

PA 443 leaves Orwigsburg for West Brunswick Township and becomes Chestnut Road, passing through a mix of farmland and woodland with some homes and heading to the east. The road heads into East Brunswick Township and continues through agricultural areas before it runs through the residential community of McKeansburg. After this, the route comes to an intersection with PA 895. Here, PA 443 heads northeast with PA 895 on Summer Valley Road and the two routes run through wooded areas with some homes, curving east. The road crosses the Little Schuylkill River into the borough of New Ringgold and becomes Hughes Avenue, heading southeast past residences and businesses. The roadway bends east and crosses the Reading Blue Mountain and Northern Railroad's Reading Division line at-grade immediately before PA 443 splits from PA 895 by turning north onto Railroad Avenue. The route runs between the railroad tracks to the west and homes to the east before it curves northeast through forested areas parallel to the Little Schuylkill River. PA 443 heads back into East Brunswick Township and becomes Clamtown Road, winding northeast through a mix of farm fields and woods. The road runs through a dense forest and bends north to enter West Penn Township, running through more woodland with some fields and passing through the community of Clamtown. The route crosses the Little Schuylkill River into Walker Township and reaches the community of Zehners, where it turns east and runs parallel to the Reading Blue Mountain and Northern Railroad's Reading Division tracks. PA 443 curves northeast and crosses the Little Schuylkill River back into West Penn Township, where it comes to an intersection with PA 309 in the community of South Tamaqua.

Here, PA 443 turns east for a concurrency with PA 309 on four-lane undivided West Penn Pike, passing through wooded areas with some homes. PA 443 splits from PA 309 by heading east-northeast on two-lane undivided Penn Drive, running through a mix of farmland and woodland with some homes near the Mahoning Creek and passing through the community of Wehr. The road crosses into Mahoning Township in Carbon County and becomes Blakeslee Boulevard Drive West, continuing northeast through agricultural areas with some woods and residences. The route heads through the community of Normal Square and passes to the south of Jake Arner Memorial Airport. Farther northeast, PA 443 becomes Blakeslee Boulevard Drive East and runs through a mix of woodland and commercial development, passing to the north of the Carbon Plaza Mall. The road becomes the border between the borough of Lehighton to the north and Mahoning Township to the south as it runs along the south bank of Mahoning Creek and intersects the eastern terminus of PA 902. The route crosses the creek to fully enter Lehighton and curve northeast, passing more businesses. PA 443 comes to its eastern terminus at an intersection with US 209 on the west bank of the Lehigh River, where the road continues northeast as part of US 209 and crosses the river.

== History ==
Pennsylvania Route 925
- Location: Orwigsburg – South Tamaqua
- Existed: 1928–1940s

When Pennsylvania first legislated routes in 1911, what would become PA 443 was designated as Legislative Route 141 between Harper Tavern and Lickdale and as Legislative Route 140 between Lickdale and Schuylkill Haven. PA 443 was designated in 1928 to run from PA 43 (Jonestown Road) in Harper Tavern northeast to US 120 (now PA 61) in Schuylkill Haven, following present-day PA 934 and Fisher Avenue northeast to Lickdale, present-day PA 72 north to Green Point, and its current alignment from Green Point to Schuylkill Haven. At this time, the route was paved between west of Pine Grove and Schuylkill Haven while the remainder was unpaved. PA 925 was designated in 1928 to run from New Ringgold northeast to PA 29 (now PA 309) in South Tamaqua along an unpaved road. The section of present-day PA 443 on West Market Street in Orwigsburg was part of US 120. By 1930, PA 443 was realigned at Lickdale to head south to a new western terminus at PA 43 (Jonestown Road) west of Jonestown. At this time, the entire length of PA 443 was paved. By 1930, the road running between Blue Mountain and Second Mountain along with the road between Orwigsburg and New Ringgold were both unnumbered, unpaved roads.

In the 1930s, PA 443 was realigned at Green Point to head west to US 11/US 15/US 22/US 322 (North Front Street) on the east bank of the Susquehanna River north of Rockville along a paved road. The former alignment of the route between Jonestown and Green Point became a northern extension of PA 72. PA 925 was extended west from New Ringgold to US 122 (now PA 61) west of Orwigsburg in the 1930s; the route replaced the section of US 122 (which had replaced US 120) on West Market Street in Orwigsburg that was realigned to bypass the borough to the southwest. At this time, the entire length of PA 925 was paved. In addition, the highway between PA 29 south of South Tamaqua and Lehighton was constructed as an unnumbered paved road in the 1930s. In the 1940s, PA 443 was extended east from US 122 in Schuylkill Haven to US 209/US 309 in Lehighton along its current alignment. The route replaced the entire length of PA 925 between Orwigsburg and South Tamaqua. In addition, the route was widened to a multilane road between the border of Dauphin and Lebanon counties and Fort Indiantown Gap. In 1977, US 22/US 322 were shifted from North Front Street to a freeway a short distance to the east; the western terminus of PA 443 remained at unnumbered North Front Street a short distance to the west of an interchange with the US 22/US 322 freeway. The route was widened into a divided highway in the vicinity of the interchange.

== Major intersections ==
County	Location	mi	km	Destinations	Notes
Dauphin	Middle Paxton Township	0.000	0.000	SR 3009 (North Front Street) – Fort Hunter Park	Western terminus; former routing of US 22 / US 322
Dauphin	Middle Paxton Township	0.208	0.335	US 22 / US 322 – Lewistown, Harrisburg	Interchange
Lebanon	Union Township	24.499	39.427	PA 72 south to I-81	Northern terminus of PA 72
Schuylkill	Pine Grove Township	32.676– 32.709	52.587– 52.640	I-81 – Hazleton, Harrisburg	Exit 100 (I-81)
Schuylkill	Pine Grove Township	34.796	55.999	PA 645 south (Geary Wolf Road) – Frystown	Northern terminus of PA 645
Schuylkill	Pine Grove	35.316	56.836	PA 895 east (Wood Street) to PA 501	Western terminus of PA 895
Schuylkill	Pine Grove	35.821	57.648	PA 125 north (Tulpehocken Street) to I-81 north – Tremont, Shamokin	Southern terminus of PA 125
Schuylkill	Wayne Township	45.892	73.856	PA 183 – Cressona, Reading	
Schuylkill	Schuylkill Haven	49.372	79.457	PA 61 north (Center Avenue) – Pottsville	Western terminus of concurrency
Schuylkill	North Manheim Township	51.397	82.715	PA 61 south (Center Avenue) – Reading	Eastern terminus of concurrency
Schuylkill	East Brunswick Township	58.708	94.481	PA 895 west (Summer Valley Road) – Deer Lake	Western terminus of concurrency
Schuylkill	New Ringgold	59.933	96.453	PA 895 east (Hughes Avenue) – Bowmanstown	Eastern terminus of concurrency
Schuylkill	West Penn Township	66.682	107.314	PA 309 north (West Penn Pike) – Tamaqua	Western terminus of concurrency
Schuylkill	West Penn Township	67.670	108.904	PA 309 south (West Penn Pike) – Allentown	Eastern terminus of concurrency
Carbon	Lehighton	79.523	127.980	PA 902 west (9th Street) – Summit Hill, Lansford	Eastern terminus of PA 902
Carbon	Lehighton	80.514	129.575	US 209 (Bankway/Forge Street) – Stroudsburg, Lehighton, Jim Thorpe	Eastern terminus
1.000 mi = 1.609 km; 1.000 km = 0.621 mi: Concurrency terminus
