= Pennsylvania Route 895 =

State highway in Pennsylvania, US

Pennsylvania Route 895

Route information
- Maintained by PennDOT
- Length: 47.374 mi (76.241 km)

Major junctions
- West end: PA 443 in Pine Grove
- PA 501 near Pine Grove; PA 183 in Wayne Township; PA 61 in Deer Lake; PA 443 in New Ringgold; PA 309 in West Penn Township
- East end: PA 248 in Bowmanstown

Location
- Country: United States
- State: Pennsylvania
- Counties: Schuylkill, Carbon

Highway system
- Pennsylvania State Route System; Interstate; US; State; Scenic; Legislative
← I-895	→ PA 896

Pennsylvania Route 895 (PA 895) is a 47.37 mi (76.23 km) state highway in the U.S. state of Pennsylvania. It is an east–west route, running from PA 443 in Pine Grove in Schuylkill County east to and PA 248 in Bowmanstown in Carbon County. PA 895 is a two-lane undivided road that passes through rural areas in the southern sections of Schuylkill and Carbon counties, serving Auburn, Deer Lake, and New Ringgold. The entire course is close to the north flank of Blue Mountain. PA 895 was designated in 1928 between Auburn and U.S. Route 120 (US 120, now PA 61) in Pinedale. In the 1930s, the route was extended west to PA 443 in Pine Grove and east to US 309 at White Street in Bowmanstown. In 1961, the east end was moved to an interchange with the PA 29/PA 45 (now PA 248) freeway in Bowmanstown. Contrary to the highway’s designated number, it is not connected to or a bypass of Interstate 95, which runs in the Philadelphia area.

== Route description ==
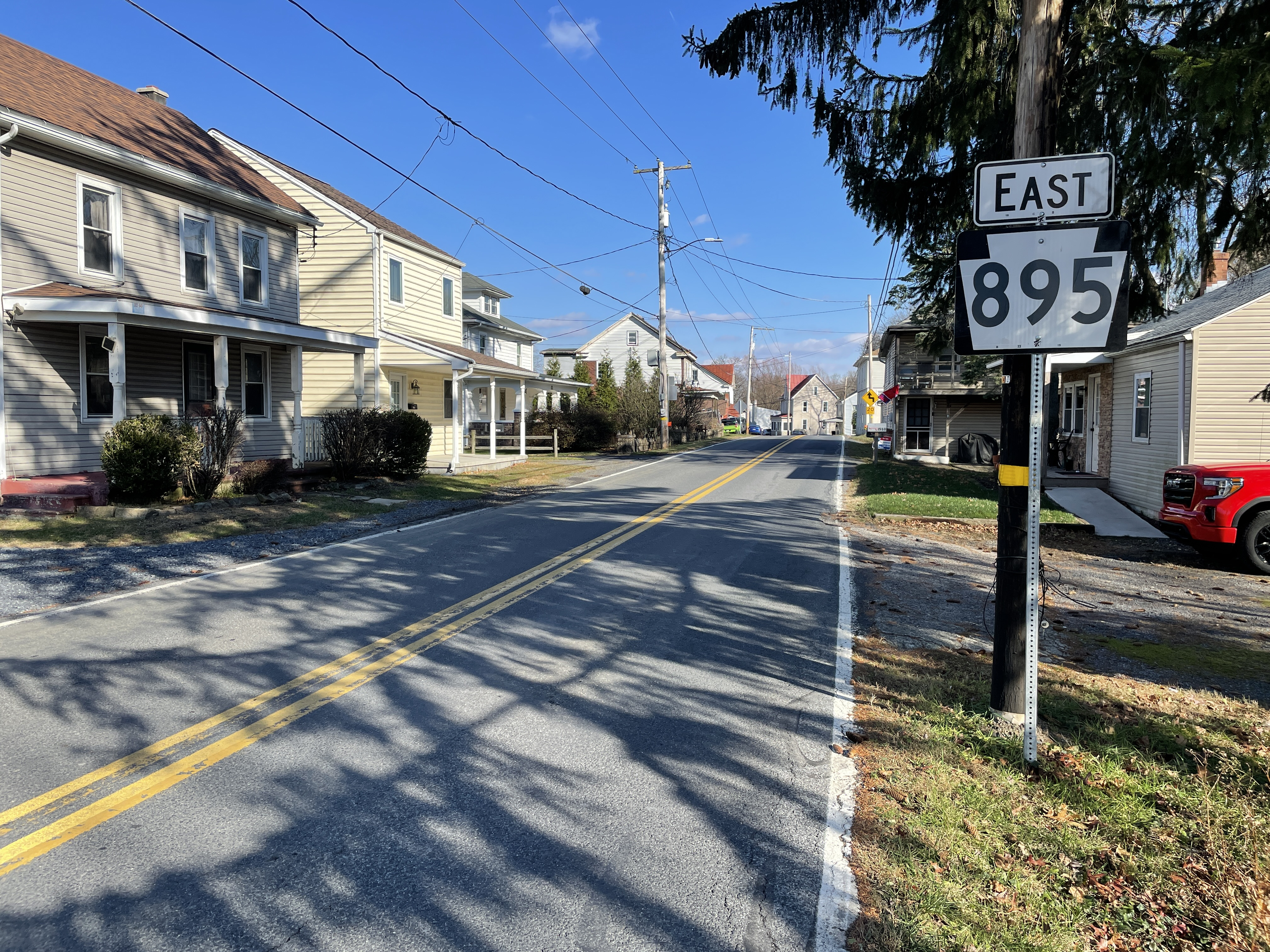
PA 895 eastbound past PA 183 in Wayne Township

PA 895 begins at an intersection with PA 443 in the borough of Pine Grove in Schuylkill County, heading east on two-lane undivided East Wood Street. The road runs through residential areas and curves southeast, crossing the Swatara Creek into Pine Grove Township. The route becomes an unnamed road and continues past a few homes, turning east and intersecting the northern terminus of PA 501 in Marstown. PA 895 runs through a mix of farm fields and woods with some homes a short distance to the north of Lower Little Swatara Creek on Rock Road, crossing into Washington Township. The road continues through rural land, passing through the community of Rock. Farther east, the route enters Wayne Township and becomes Fair Road, passing through the community of Moyers. PA 895 heads through agricultural areas, briefly turning north before making a turn back to the east. The road comes to an intersection with PA 183 a short distance to the west of the community of Summit Station.

The route runs northeast through wooded areas with some fields and development parallel to Bear Creek. The roadway passes through Roeders and runs to the north of the Schuylkill County Fairgrounds before it crosses into South Manheim Township. PA 895 runs through the community of Jefferson and continues through rural areas before it crosses into the borough of Auburn. Here, the road becomes Market Street and is lined with homes. The route passes under a Reading Blue Mountain and Northern Railroad line and enters West Brunswick Township, running through woods and coming to a bridge over the Schuylkill River and intersecting the Schuylkill River Trail. PA 895 heads northeast through rural areas with residential and commercial development, entering the borough of Deer Lake and reaching a junction with PA 61 that is controlled by jughandles.

At this point, PA 895 turns east for a concurrency with PA 61 on Centre Turnpike, a four-lane divided highway with a Jersey barrier, passing through wooded areas with nearby residential neighborhoods. The road leaves Deer Lake for West Brunswick Township again, curving southeast and running through a mix of farm fields and woods. In the community of Molino, PA 895 splits from PA 61 at a jughandle-controlled intersection by turning northeast onto two-lane undivided Summer Valley Road. The road runs through farmland with some trees and homes a short distance to the west of the Little Schuylkill River and Blue Mountain. The route curves north and passes through the community of Millers before it enters East Brunswick Township and heads through Drehersville. PA 895 continues through rural land, curving west and back north before it heads northeast and intersects PA 443 east of the community of McKeansburg. Here, PA 443 joins PA 895 and the two routes run through wooded areas with some homes, curving east. The road crosses the Little Schuylkill River into the borough of New Ringgold and becomes Hughes Avenue, heading southeast past residences and businesses. The roadway bends east and crosses the Reading Blue Mountain and Northern Railroad's Reading Division line at-grade immediately before PA 443 turns north onto Railroad Avenue. PA 895 continues east along Hughes Avenue past homes before entering forests.

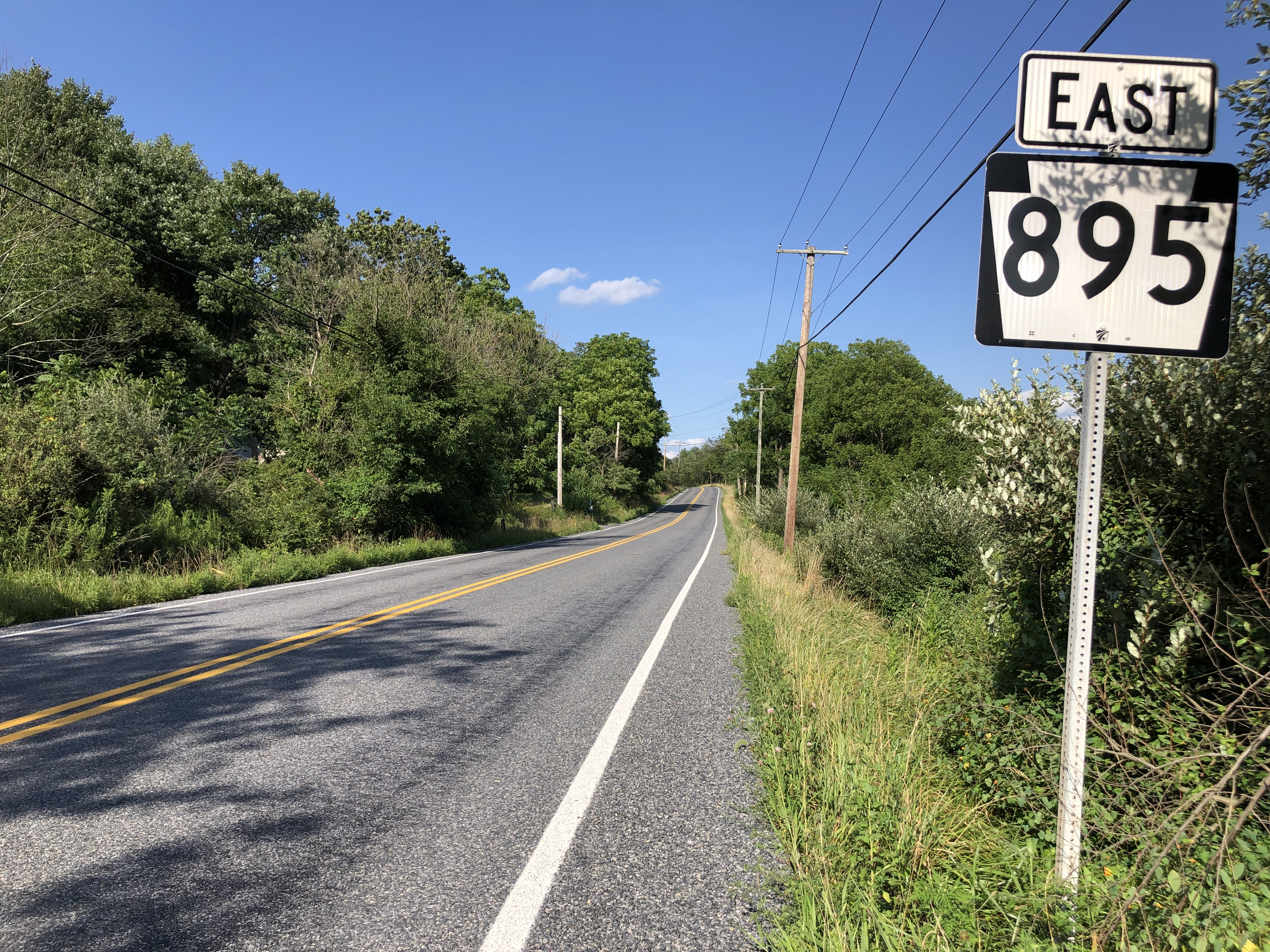
PA 895 eastbound in East Penn Township

The route leaves New Ringgold for East Brunswick Township again and becomes Summer Valley Road, passing through wooded areas with some fields and homes. The road bends to the northeast and crosses into West Penn Township, where it passes through the community of Kepner. PA 895 continues through rural areas and follows the Lizard Creek, reaching an intersection with PA 309 in the community of Snyders. Past this intersection, the route becomes Lizard Creek Road and runs parallel to the creek through agricultural areas with some woods and residences, serving the communities of Mantz and Andreas. The road crosses into East Penn Township in Carbon County and continues northeast through a mix of farm fields and forests with occasional homes, passing through the community of Ashfield. The roadway heads into more wooded areas and passes through the residential community of West Bowmans, where it comes to a bridge over Interstate 476 (Pennsylvania Turnpike Northeast Extension). After passing through West Bowmans, the route crosses the Lehigh River into the borough of Bowmanstown. Here, PA 895 becomes Lehigh Street and runs past homes and businesses for a block before ending at a right-in/right-out ramp with the eastbound direction of the PA 248 freeway. Access to and from the westbound direction of PA 248 is provided by Bank Street, which branches from PA 895 just past the Lehigh River and heads east to intersect the ramp from westbound PA 248 and White Street, the latter which leads to an entrance to westbound PA 248.

== History ==
When Pennsylvania legislated routes in 1911, what is now PA 895 was not given a number. PA 895 was designated in 1928 to run from Auburn northeast to US 120 (now PA 61) in Pinedale in along an unpaved road. The entire length of PA 895 was paved by 1930. At this time, the road west of Auburn was an unnumbered, unpaved road, while the road between Molino and Bowmanstown was an unnumbered road that was paved east of Andreas and unpaved west of there. In the 1930s, PA 895 was extended west from Auburn to PA 443 in Pine Grove and was extended east from US 122 (which had replaced US 120) in Pinedale to US 309 (White Street) in Bowmanstown. At this time, the entire length of the route was paved. In Bowmanstown, the route ran along Bank Street between the Lehigh River and US 309. In 1961, the eastern terminus of PA 895 was moved to its current location at an interchange with the newly constructed PA 29/PA 45 (now PA 248) freeway in Bowmanstown. In September 2012, a project began to widen and improve the stretch of PA 895 concurrent with PA 61 between Deer Lake and Molino into a four-lane divided highway; this project was completed in 2015.

== Major intersections ==
County	Location	mi	km	Destinations	Notes
Schuylkill	Pine Grove	0.000	0.000	PA 443 (Tulpehocken Street) to I-81 / PA 125 – Fort Indiantown Gap, Tremont	Western terminus
Schuylkill	Pine Grove Township	0.605	0.974	PA 501 south – Bethel	Northern terminus of PA 501
Schuylkill	Wayne Township	10.211	16.433	PA 183 – Cressona, Reading	
Schuylkill	Deer Lake	19.331	31.110	PA 61 north (Centre Turnpike) – Pottsville	West end of PA 61 overlap
Schuylkill	West Brunswick Township	20.935	33.692	PA 61 south – Reading	East end of PA 61 overlap
Schuylkill	East Brunswick Township	26.482	42.619	PA 443 west – Orwigsburg	West end of PA 443 overlap
Schuylkill	New Ringgold	27.708	44.592	PA 443 east (East Railroad Avenue) – South Tamaqua	East end of PA 443 overlap
Schuylkill	West Penn Township	35.658	57.386	PA 309 (West Penn Pike) – Tamaqua, Allentown	
Carbon	Bowmanstown	47.295	76.114	Banks Street to PA 248 west – Bowmanstown, Lehighton	
Carbon	Bowmanstown	47.374	76.241	PA 248 east – Palmerton	Interchange; eastern terminus
1.000 mi = 1.609 km; 1.000 km = 0.621 mi: Concurrency terminus
