= Penn Township, Pennsylvania =

Penn Township is the name of some places in the U.S. state of Pennsylvania:

- Penn Township, Berks County, Pennsylvania
- Penn Township, Butler County, Pennsylvania
- Penn Township, Centre County, Pennsylvania
- Penn Township, Chester County, Pennsylvania
- Penn Township, Clearfield County, Pennsylvania
- Penn Township, Cumberland County, Pennsylvania
- Penn Township, Huntingdon County, Pennsylvania
- Penn Township, Lancaster County, Pennsylvania
- Penn Township, Lycoming County, Pennsylvania
- Penn Township, Perry County, Pennsylvania
- Penn Township, Snyder County, Pennsylvania
- Penn Township, Westmoreland County, Pennsylvania
- Penn Township, York County, Pennsylvania
- Penn Township, Philadelphia County, Pennsylvania, defunct, now part of Philadelphia

== See also ==
- East Penn Township, Pennsylvania
- Penn Forest Township, Pennsylvania
- Penn Hills Township, Allegheny County, Pennsylvania
- Pennsbury Township, Pennsylvania
- West Penn Township, Pennsylvania
