= Ashfield, Pennsylvania =

Unincorporated community in Pennsylvania, US

Coordinates: 40°47′04″N 75°42′49″W

Ashfield is an unincorporated community in East Penn Township, Carbon County, Pennsylvania, located south of Lehighton and west of Bowmanstown on Route 895 at the northern foot of Blue Mountain. Lizard Creek flows east through Ashfield into the Lehigh River. Although the village has its own post office with the ZIP code of 18212, some residents are served by the Lehighton post office, ZIP code 18235.

The grave of Charles M. Schwab's father-in-law, Reuben Dinkey, was in a church cemetery in Ashfield. Schwab donated funds for the construction of a new church building in the town, named Dinkey Memorial Church, in 1914.
