= Andreas, Pennsylvania =

Village in Pennsylvania, US

Coordinates: 40°45′06″N 75°47′33″W

Andreas is a village in the southeast corner of Schuylkill County, Pennsylvania, in West Penn Township on Route 895. A small part of Andreas is also in East Penn Township in Carbon County. The Lizard Creek flows eastward through the village to the Lehigh River. Andreas lies at the northern foot of Blue Mountain in ZIP Code 18211.

The village and surrounds are geographically closer to Allentown and Bethlehem than to the Schuylkill County seat at Pottsville. Andreas is part of the Lehigh Valley, which has a population of 861,899 and is the 69th most populated metropolitan area in the U.S.

Andreas is served by the Mantzville exchanges (386 and 818) in area code 570 and (205) in area code 272. Residents in the eastern section of the village can be assigned a number in the Lehighton (377) exchange of area code 610.

Andreas is surrounded by slate quarries. Cellar Beast Winehouse is located 2 1/2 miles west of the village. Galen Glen Winery is located 1 1/2 miles NW of the village and is included in the Lehigh Valley Wine Trail of the Lehigh Valley AVA. The local hardiness zone is 6a.

== Notable people ==
- Doug Flex, former professional wrestler
