= East Penn =

East Penn may refer to:

- Eastern Pennsylvania, also known as the Lehigh Valley
- East Penn School District in Emmaus, Pennsylvania
- East Penn Township, Pennsylvania
- East Pennsboro Township, Cumberland County, Pennsylvania
