= Doug Flex =

American professional wrestler, promoter

Personal information
- Born: Doug Yasinsky; 1964 (age 61–62) Andreas, Pennsylvania, U.S.

Professional wrestling career
- Ring name: Doug Flex
- Billed height: 6 ft 2 in (188 cm)
- Billed weight: 275 lb (125 kg)
- Billed from: Andreas, Pennsylvania, U.S.
- Debut: 1988
- Retired: 2004

Doug Yasinsky (born 1964) is an American retired professional wrestler and promoter, better known by his ring name "Dashing" Doug Flex, who competed in the Mid-Atlantic and East Coast independent circuit during the late 1980s and 1990s. He frequently teamed with Brick Bronsky throughout his career and, along with manager G.Q. Bronsky, were together known as The Brat Pack.

Yasinsky was popular in Pennsylvania, especially Lehigh Valley, not only as a wrestler but also for his volunteer work with teenagers and organizations such as the Special Olympics. He also promoted amateur boxing and mixed martial arts. His first boxing card in 1992 showcased fighters from six towns and was the first held in Lehighton, Pennsylvania in seven years. He was the co-owner of the Harrisburg-based International Pro Wrestling with longtime tag team partner Brick Bronsky from 1997 until 2004.

== Biography ==
=== Early life and education ===
Doug Yasinsky was born in Andreas, Pennsylvania in 1964. He attended Tamaqua High School in Tamaqua, Pennsylvania, where he graduated in 1982. He then attended Penn State, where he met his future tag team partner Brick Bronsky.

== Career ==
=== Volunteer work with the Special Olympics ===
During this time, both Yasinsky and Bronsky became known for their volunteer work with local youths in the Lehighton, Pennsylvania area and counseled high school students across the United States about the dangers of drug and steroid abuse. The two would typically lecture at the local high schools of wherever they were wrestling and would donate to a local charity if the promoters received a fee for their appearance. They had both used steroids for several years before serious health risks and side effects forced them to stop. Yasinsky was also a volunteer for Carbon County Special Olympics and a counselor for juvenile delinquents in Carbon County.

On April 13, 1991, Yasinsky beat the "California Darling" Mr. Anthony in a fundraising event for Colonial Championship Wrestling at Lehighton High School with the proceeds going to the Carbon County Special Olympics. The event was attended by about 1,200 people and featured Bam Bam Bigelow, Dusty Wolfe and The Super Destroyers (Doug Stahl & A. J. Petrucci). His bout against Mr. Anthony was preceded by a verbal altercation while speaking at a Lehighton Area Chamber of Commerce function to promote the event. When Yasinsky made comments about the flamboyant Californian wrestler's pink ring attire, Anthony responded by calling his opponent a "country bumpkin". He faced Mr. Anthony in a battle royal later that night and slammed him into a door. Two months later, Yasinsky broke his ankle and would not be able to wrestle until the following year.

In December 1991, he and Bronsky became the owners and operators of the Lehighton Recreational Complex in Lehighton, Pennsylvania. Hoping to encourage teenagers to take up bodybuilding, they offered karate lessons, dance classes, weight training and a power-lifting team. Their partner George Harris, a former commissioner for the Lehighton Recreational Adult Basketball League, ran the gym while Yasinsky and Bronsky continued wrestling.

=== Promoting boxing and wrestling ===
Having a mutual interest in both bodybuilding and professional wrestling, Yasinsky and Bronsky eventually entered professional wrestling, and Yasinsky making his debut in 1988. They won the Canadian International Tag Team Championship in 1988 and 1989, the Galaxy Wrestling Federation Tag Team Championship in 1990, and the North American Wrestling Federation Tag Team Championship in 1991.

Yasinsky won singles titles in a number of various independent promotions during the first three years of his career, including the U.S. Heavyweight Championship in 1989 and the Galaxy Wrestling Federation Heavyweight Championship in 1990. He also scored victories over Sgt. Slaughter, Ken Patera, Nikolai Volkoff, and Bam Bam Bigelow on the independent circuit. By the end of 1991, Yasinsky had wrestled in Japan, Canada and almost every state in the United States. In early 1992, Yasinsky and Bronsky began promoting amateur boxing from their Lehighton gymnasium called The Racquet and Fitness Factory. On April 9, 1992, their first card featured the Twin Mountain Boxing Club of Bowmanstown as well as similar clubs from Lebanon, Shenandoah, Scranton, Bethlehem, Allentown, and Reading, Pennsylvania for 9-12 bouts. It was the first boxing matches held in the area since October 1984.

On March 22, Yasinsky and Bronsky held a wrestling show at The Racquet and Fitness Factory to raise money for the Carbon County Association of Retarded Citizens. Yasinsky faced Satanic Warrior while Brick Bronsky wrestled Morgus the Maniac. The card also featured wrestlers from the Wrestling Independent Network and independent wrestlers including The Cheetah Kid, J.T. Smith and Cream Team (Dino Casanova and Rip Sawyer).

That summer, he and Bronsky became involved in a local zoning controversy involving their gym. On August 17, local building inspector Peter Kropf sent a certified letter to Keith Boyer and the four people leasing the building that the building had numerous violations and that Boyers had 45 days to bring it into compliance with state and local codes or face daily fines of up to $1,000. Kropf also claimed that Boyer never secured a necessary permit when he opened a gym in the former silk mill in 1983. The three-story brick building housed a furniture-stripping business as well as the gym. Town officials raised concerns that the building may be unsafe, such as the absence of proper fire exits, to accommodate the hundreds of people that the gym was bringing in on the weekends. Yasinsky was the first to sign and acknowledge the town's letter.

=== International Pro Wrestling (IPW) ===
Within a few years, Yasinsky was running wrestling events with Ed Zohn. Although based in Pennsylvania, they were holding shows on the East Coast and in New England. Among the wrestlers who appeared at their shows included Don Montoya and a young Reckless Youth who made his first Connecticut appearance with the promotion. On May 20, 1995, Yasinsky teamed with The Public Enemy (Rocco Rock & Johnny Grunge) in a 6-man tag team match at a show for Extreme Championship Wrestling at The Flagstaff in Jim Thorpe, Pennsylvania. They defeated Stevie Richards & The Pitbulls (Pitbull#1 & #2) when Yasinsky pinned Richards.

Sidelined by a serious knee injury, Yasinsky would not return to wrestling full-time until 1996. By that time, he and Bronsky had started their own Harrisburg-based promotion, International Pro Wrestling, where they formed the heel stable "The Brat Pack" with manager G.Q. Bronsky. On January 11, 1997, he lost to 911 at a show for the Century Wrestling Alliance at The Sports Palace in New Britain, Connecticut. Five months later, he met 911 in a rematch at an IPW event at Flagstaff Hall in Jim Thorpe. Their match was part of a triple main event including a match between Bam Bam Bigelow and Glen Osbourne, and IPW Heavyweight Champion Brick Bronsky defending his title against Frank Stalletto. A cruiserweight match between Reckless Youth and Julio Sanchez was featured on the undercard.

On December 5, 1997, Yasinsky faced Cueball Carmichael wrestled Doug Flex at Flagstaff Mountain Park in Jim Thorpe. One of the biggest IPW shows of the year, the event raised money for the United Cerebral Palsy of Carbon County organization. The event also included many top independent stars including 911, Glen Osborne, Reckless Youth, Julio Sanchez, Mike Quackenbush, Jimmy Cicero and King Kong Bundy. Gene Snisky, a future WWE star, also made his Pennsylvania debut.

During the next year, according to independent wrestler Tommy Idol, Yasinsky and booker Ed Zohn stopped running shows in the Lebanon area following a dispute with rival promoter Larry Brown allowing his Lethal Wrestling Federation to take over the "open town". Prior to his official ranking in the 1998 PWI 500, he put out an open challenge to any wrestler rated higher than him (#433) to meet him in IPW.

=== Close of IPW and retirement ===
Yasinsky brought in many high-profile wrestlers into IPW during the next few years. On March 31, 2001, he wrestled George "The Animal" Steele in Bushkill, Pennsylvania. He also appeared with Adam Flash at an event for Future Wrestling Alliance in Reading on October 13, 2001. The event was covered by Smart Mark Video and was commentated by Reckless Youth and Jeff Gorman.

Prior to its close, Yasinsky wrestled Hosaka Sato at an IPW show in Summit Hill, Pennsylvania on March 19, 2004. Later that night, he served as IPW Heavyweight Champion Salvatore Sincere's bodyguard in his match against The Hungarian Barbarian. Also on the card were Julio Dinero, Mike Quackenbush, The Patriot, Eddie Kingston, Gran Akuma, Hallowicked, Sonjay Dutt, Ruckus, Bobcat, Al Snow and Jerry "The King" Lawler. Yasinsky continued to promote sporting events, mostly boxing and mixed martial arts, in Pennsylvania during the 2000s. He also collaborated with screenwriter Dale Schneck to create a drama television series based around professional wrestling.

== World Cage-fighting Championships (WCC) ==
In 2009, Yasinsky and Jeff Sibbach launched the World Cage-fighting Championships, then joined forces with TYHG', and Yasinsky's former, and Sibbach's original, Professional Wrestling Tag-Team Partner Brick Bronsky (Jeff Beltzner of Evolving Pictures Entertainment).

On November 20, 2009, the World Cage-fighting Championships (WCC 1) "The Steel City Beatdown”, was the first sanctioned Mixed Martial Arts event to be held in Westmoreland County, Pennsylvania.

At the (WCC 3) "Brawl at the Hall", on October 9, 2010, 'UFC' veteran Carmelo Marrero defeated former 'Bellator' fighter Steven Banks with a neck crank tap out at 2:33 of Round 2 to win the vacant World Cage-fighting Championships Heavyweight Title.

As of June 2018, the World Cage-fighting Championships had held 19 events and (in addition to the numerous undercard fights), has presided over approximately 134 professional matches.

== Championships and accomplishments ==
- Galaxy Wrestling Federation
  - GWF Heavyweight Championship (1 time)
  - GWF Tag Team Championship (1 time) – with Brick Bronsky
- North American Wrestling Federation
  - NAWF Tag Team Championship (1 time) – with Brick Bronsky
- Other
  - U.S. Heavyweight Championship (1 time)
  - Canadian International Tag Team Championship (2 times) – with Brick Bronsky
- Pro Wrestling Illustrated
  - PWI ranked him # 433 of the 500 best singles wrestlers of the PWI 500 in 1998
  - PWI ranked him # 469 of the 500 best singles wrestlers of the PWI 500 in 1997
