= Wayne Township, Schuylkill County, Pennsylvania =

Township in Pennsylvania, US

Coordinates: 40°38′00″N 76°14′29″W

- Township
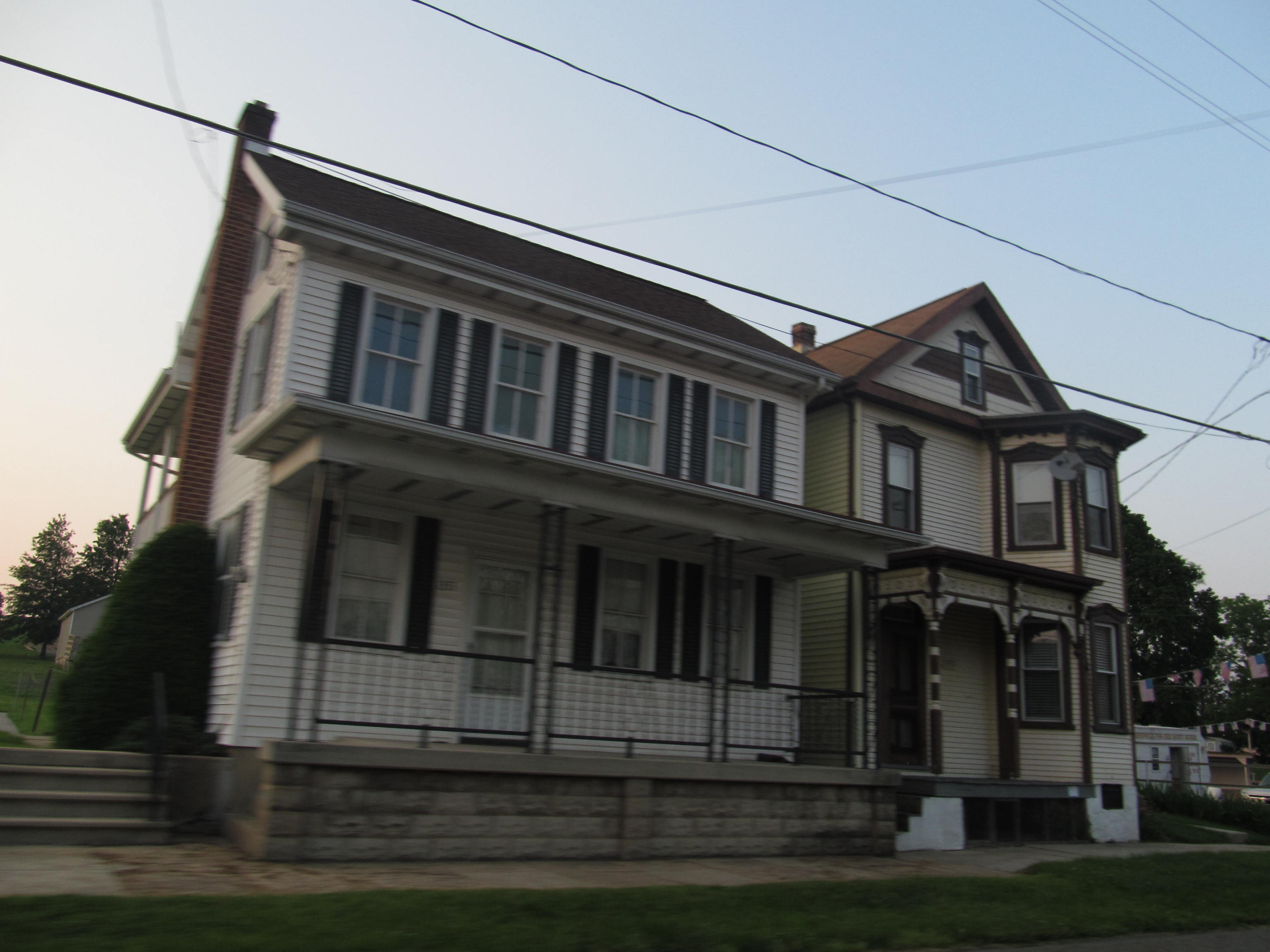
- Along Pennsylvania Route 443 in Friedensburg

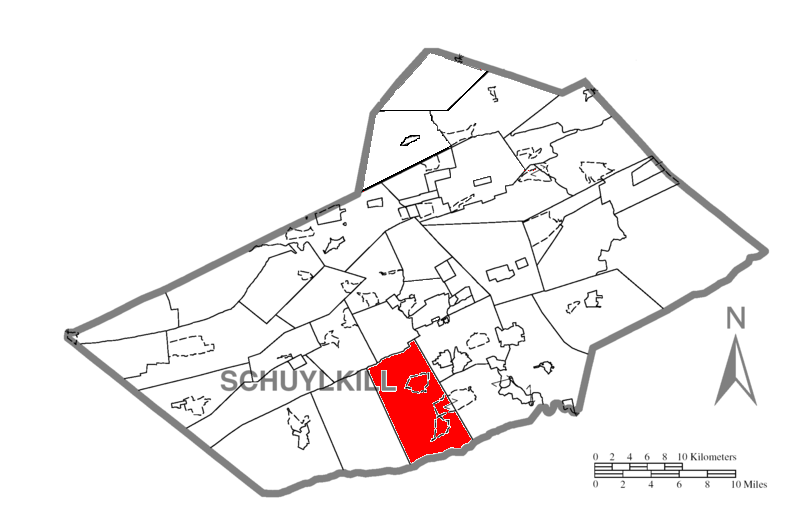
- Map of Schuylkill County, Pennsylvania Highlighting Wayne Township

- Map of Schuylkill County, Pennsylvania
- Country: United States
- State: Pennsylvania
- County: Schuylkill
- Settled: 1759
- Incorporated: 1827

Area
  - Total: 35.21 sq mi (91.19 km^{2})
  - Land: 35.15 sq mi (91.05 km^{2})
  - Water: 0.054 sq mi (0.14 km^{2})

Population (2020)
  - Total: 5,226 ▲
  - Estimate (2021): 5,250
  - Density: 144.7/sq mi (55.86/km^{2})
- Time zone: UTC-5 (Eastern (EST))
  - Summer (DST): UTC-4 (EDT)
- ZIP code: 17933, 17972
- Area code: 570
- FIPS code: 42-107-81792
- Website: https://waynetwpschuylkill.com/

Wayne Township is a township in Schuylkill County, Pennsylvania, United States. The population was 5,226 at the 2020 census. The township includes the village of Reedsville which contains a medium size state police barracks. Children from this township attend schools in the Blue Mountain School District. The township is divided by north-to-south PA Route 183 which serves as a highway connecting Schuylkill and Berks Counties. The Schuylkill County Fairgrounds are located in the township off east-to-west PA Route 895. 183 and 895 meet in the Census Designated Place of Summit Station.

== Geography ==
According to the United States Census Bureau, the township has a total area of 35.1 square miles (90.9 km^{2}), of which 35.0 square miles (90.8 km^{2}) is land and 0.1 square mile (0.2 km^{2}) (0.17%) is water. It contains the census-designated places of Friedensburg and Summit Station and part of Lake Wynonah.

== Recreation ==
A small portion of the Pennsylvania State Game Lands Number 80 and Number 110, through which passes the Appalachian National Scenic Trail is located along the southwestern corner of the township, and a portion of the Weiser State Forest is located along the northern border of the township.

== Demographics ==
Historical population
Census	Pop.	Note	%±
2010	5,113		—
2020	5,226		2.2%
2021 (est.)	5,250		0.5%
U.S. Decennial Census

As of the census of 2000, there were 4,721 people, 1,827 households, and 1,401 families living in the township. The population density was 134.7 inhabitants per square mile (52.0/km^{2}). There were 1,972 housing units at an average density of 56.3 per square mile (21.7/km^{2}). The racial makeup of the township was 98.73% White, 0.23% African American, 0.04% Native American, 0.49% Asian, 0.23% from other races, and 0.28% from two or more races. Hispanic or Latino of any race were 0.40% of the population.

There were 1,827 households, out of which 31.7% had children under the age of 18 living with them, 66.9% were married couples living together, 6.1% had a female householder with no husband present, and 23.3% were non-families. 19.3% of all households were made up of individuals, and 7.8% had someone living alone who was 65 years of age or older. The average household size was 2.57 and the average family size was 2.94.

In the township the population was spread out, with 23.8% under the age of 18, 5.5% from 18 to 24, 30.4% from 25 to 44, 27.0% from 45 to 64, and 13.3% who were 65 years of age or older. The median age was 40 years. For every 100 females there were 99.1 males. For every 100 females age 18 and over, there were 100.8 males.

The median income for a household in the township was $45,242, and the median income for a family was $51,042. Males had a median income of $34,805 versus $24,257 for females. The per capita income for the township was $19,335. About 1.1% of families and 2.3% of the population were below the poverty line, including 2.3% of those under age 18 and 3.3% of those age 65 or over.
