= West Penn Township, Pennsylvania =

Township in Pennsylvania, US

Coordinates: 40°43′25″N 75°53′14″W

- Township
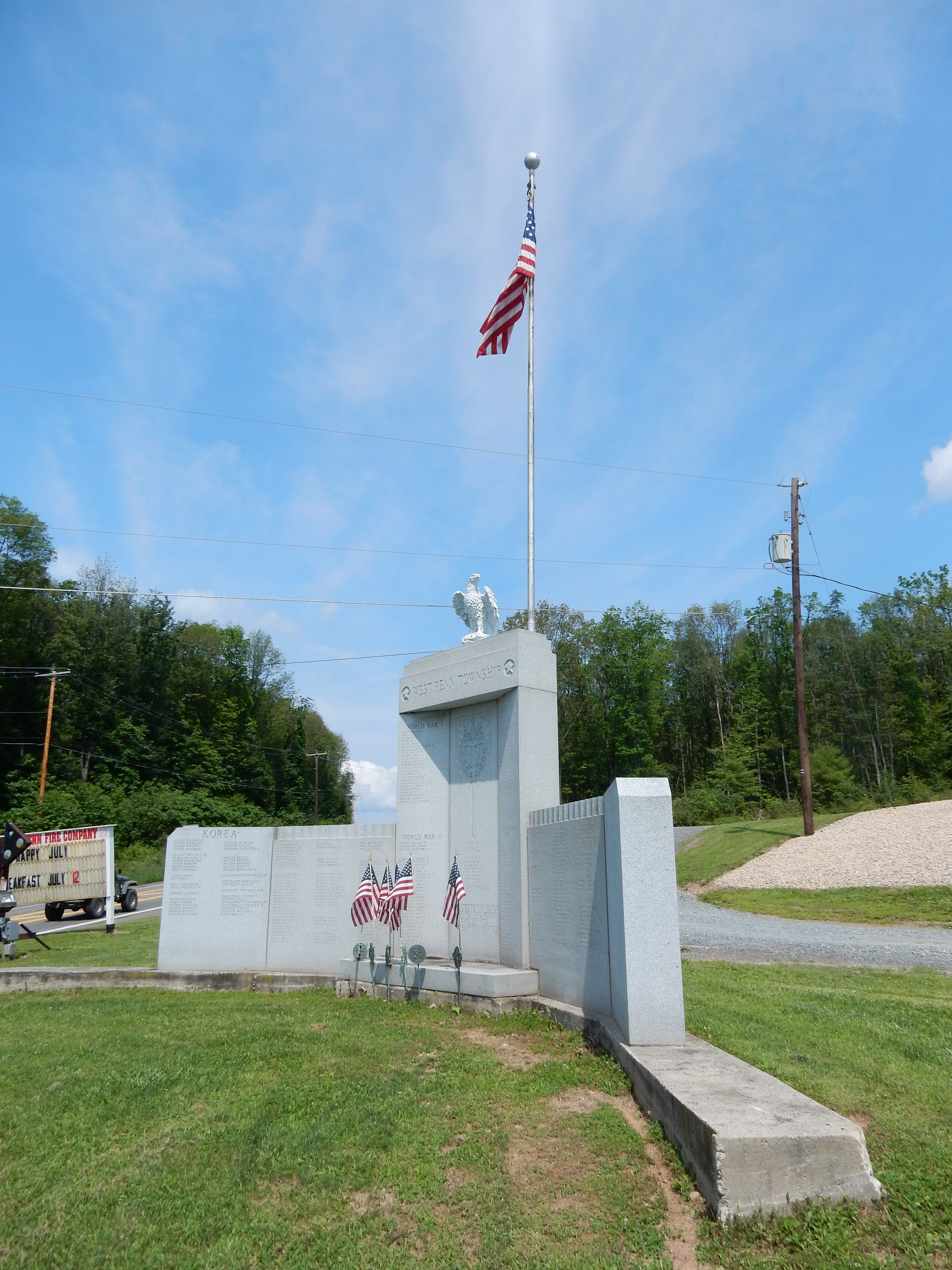
- West Penn Township War Memorial

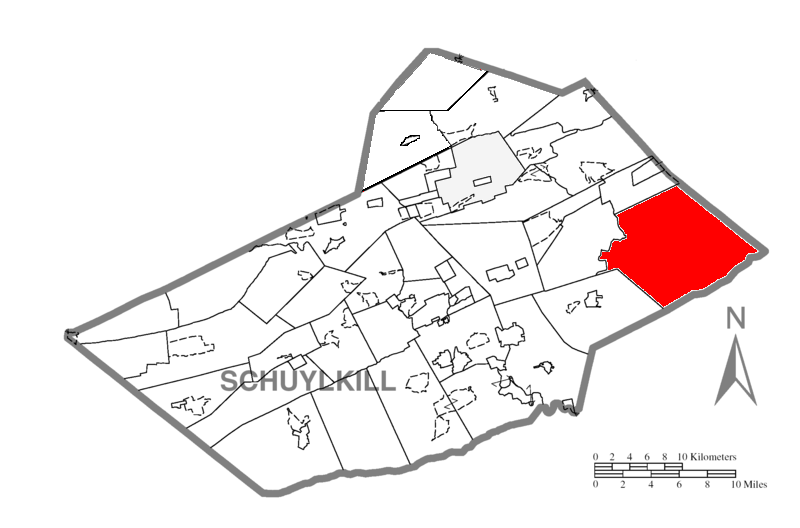
- Map of Schuylkill County, Pennsylvania Highlighting West Penn Township

- Location of West Penn Township in Schuylkill County, Pennsylvania
- Country: United States
- State: Pennsylvania
- County: Schuylkill
- Settled: 1756
- Incorporated: 1811

Area
  - Total: 58.00 sq mi (150.22 km^{2})
  - Land: 57.78 sq mi (149.64 km^{2})
  - Water: 0.22 sq mi (0.57 km^{2})

Population (2020)
  - Total: 4,383 ▼
  - Estimate (2021): 4,417
  - Density: 75.2/sq mi (29.05/km^{2})
- Time zone: UTC-5 (Eastern (EST))
  - Summer (DST): UTC-4 (EDT)
- ZIP Code: 17960, 18211, 18252, 18235
- Area codes: 570 and 610/484
- FIPS code: 42-107-83792
- Website: https://westpenntownship.org/

West Penn Township is a township in Schuylkill County, Pennsylvania, United States. The population was 4,383 in the 2020 census.

== Geography ==
According to the U.S. Census Bureau, the township has a total area of 58.2 square miles (150.7 km^{2}), of which 58.0 square miles (150.2 km^{2}) is land and 0.2 square mile (0.6 km^{2}) (0.38%) is water. It extends from Blue Mountain in the south to the border of Tamaqua in the north and from the Carbon County border in the east to the Little Schuylkill River in the west, which drains a part of its area. A sizable portion of West Penn is drained into the Lehigh River via the Mahoning and Lizard Creeks, which both originate in the township. West Penn is the largest township in Schuylkill County.

The numbered state routes of West Penn are 309, 443, and 895. West Penn's closest access to the Pennsylvania Turnpike's Northeast Extension is the Mahoning Valley Interchange east of Lehighton with U.S. Route 209. Its villages include Andreas (also in Carbon County), Clamtown, Dorset, Kepner (also in East Brunswick,) Leibeyville, Longacre, Mahoning Valley (also in Mahoning Township), Mantzville, Millers, Snyders, and South Tamaqua.

The geographic center of West Penn is located approximately 24 road miles (38 km) north of Allentown, eight road miles (9.7 km) south of Tamaqua, 15 road miles (24.1 km) east of Orwigsburg, and seven road miles (16.1 km) west of Lehighton.

=== Neighboring municipalities ===
- Tamaqua (north)
- Walker Township (west)
- East Brunswick Township (southwest)
- Albany Township (south)
- Lynn Township (south)
- Heidelberg Township (tangent to the southeast)
- East Penn Township (east)
- Mahoning Township (northeast)
- Summit Hill (northeast)

== Climate ==
West Penn has a humid continental climate (Dfa/Dfb) and the hardiness zone is 6a. Average monthly temperatures in Leibeyville range from 27.0 °F in January to 71.6 °F in July.

== Demographics ==
Historical population
Census	Pop.	Note	%±
2010	4,442		—
2020	4,383		−1.3%
2021 (est.)	4,417		0.8%
U.S. Decennial Census

As of the census of 2010, there were 4,442 people, 1,485 households, and 1,136 families residing in the township. The population density was 66.4 inhabitants per square mile (25.6/km^{2}). There were 1,607 housing units at an average density of 27.7 per square mile (10.7/km^{2}). The racial makeup of the township was 98.78% White, 0.21% African American, 0.08% Native American, 0.23% Asian, 0.34% from other races, and 0.36% from two or more races. Hispanic or Latino of any race were 0.73% of the population.

There were 1,485 households, out of which 29.0% had children under the age of 18 living with them, 67.7% were married couples living together, 5.5% had a female householder with no husband present, and 23.5% were non-families. 19.3% of all households were made up of individuals, and 9.3% had someone living alone who was 65 years of age or older. The average household size was 2.59 and the average family size was 2.97.

In the township, the population was spread out, with 22.0% under the age of 18, 6.5% from 18 to 24, 27.7% from 25 to 44, 28.4% from 45 to 64, and 15.4% who were 65 years of age or older. The median age was 41 years. For every 100 females, there were 103.2 males. For every 100 females age 18 and over, there were 102.6 males.

The median income for a household in the township was $39,276, and the median income for a family was $47,341. Males had a median income of $31,673 versus $21,649 for females. The per capita income for the township was $18,577. About 3.5% of families and 5.1% of the population were below the poverty line, including 2.8% of those under age 18 and 5.7% of those age 65 or over.

=== Legislators ===
- State Representative Jamie Barton, Republican, 124th district
- State Senator Dave Argall, Republican, 29th district
- U.S. Representative Dan Meuser, Republican, 9th district

== Gallery ==
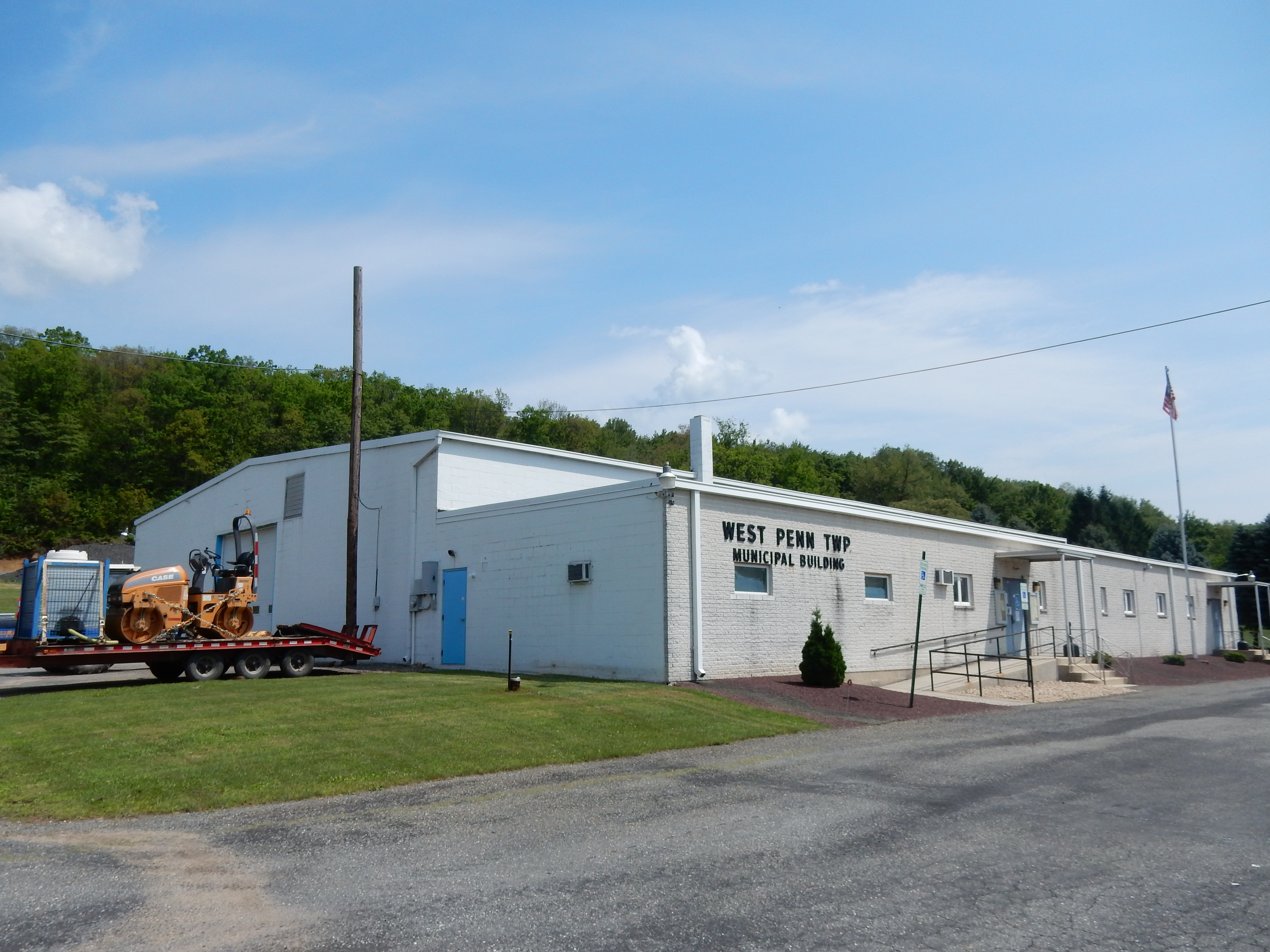
West Penn Twp Municipal Bldg.

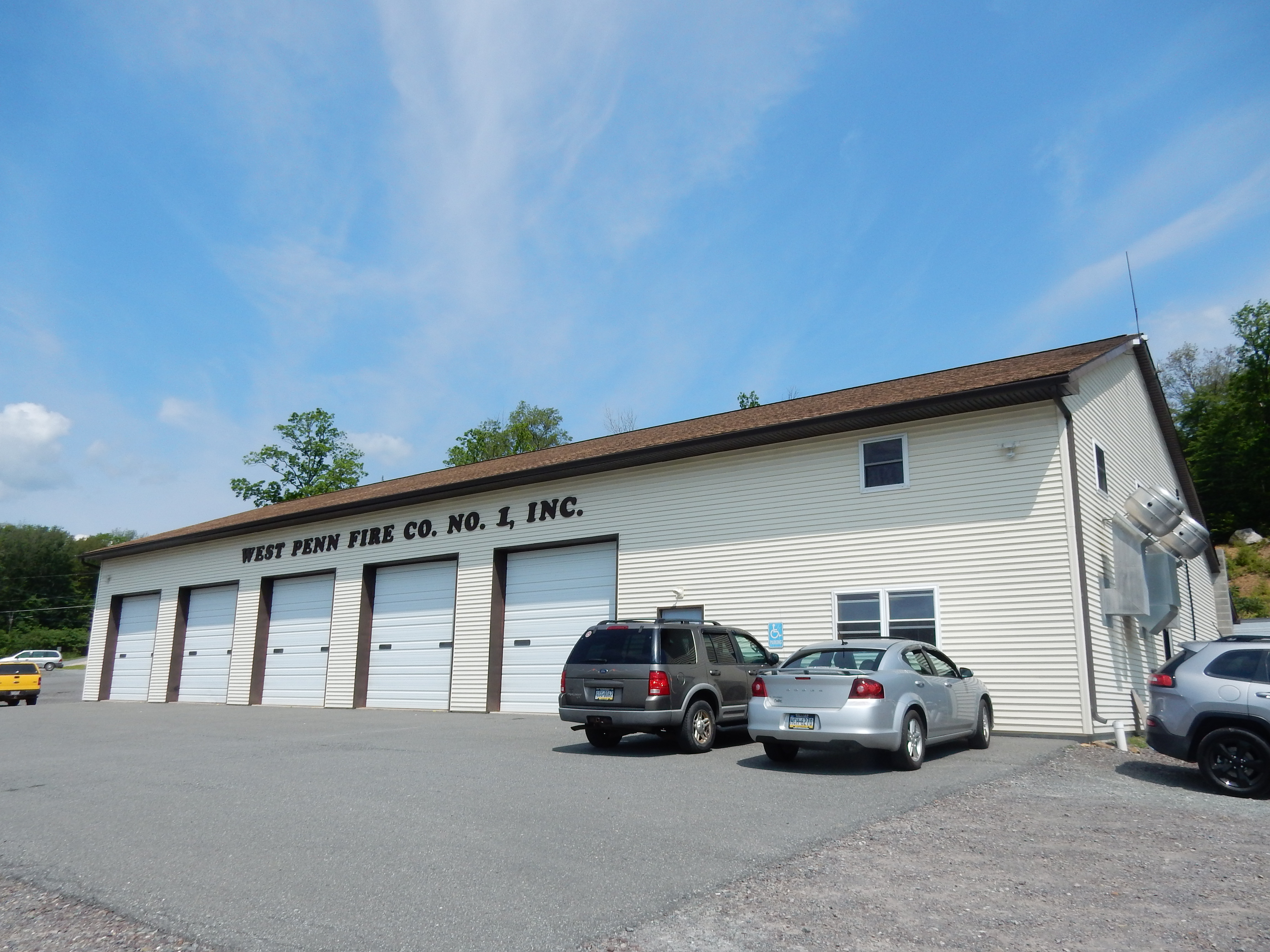
West Penn Fire Co - No.1

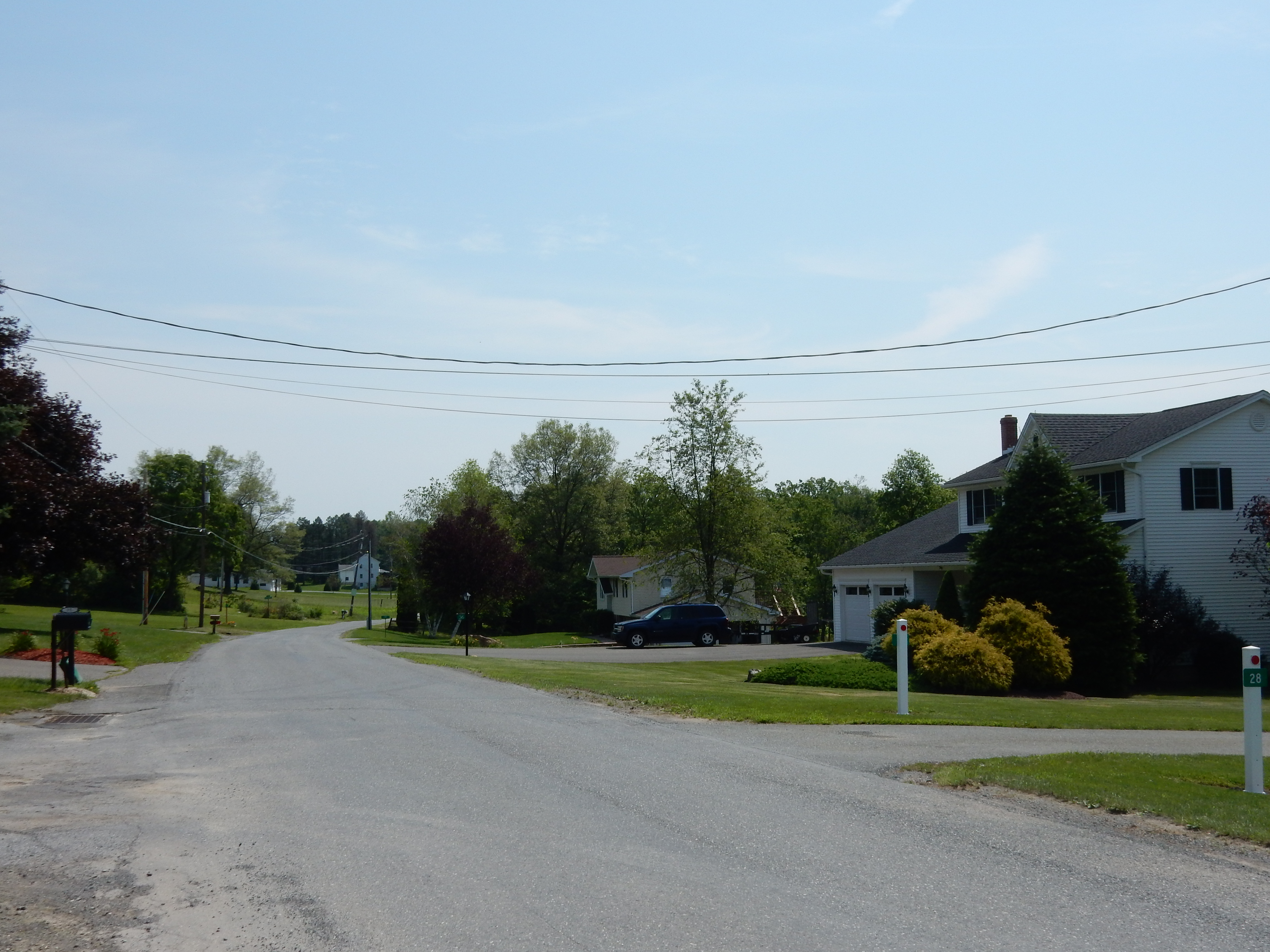
Municipal Dr.
