= Summit Station, Pennsylvania =

Unincorporated community in Pennsylvania, US

Summit Station
- Census-designated place
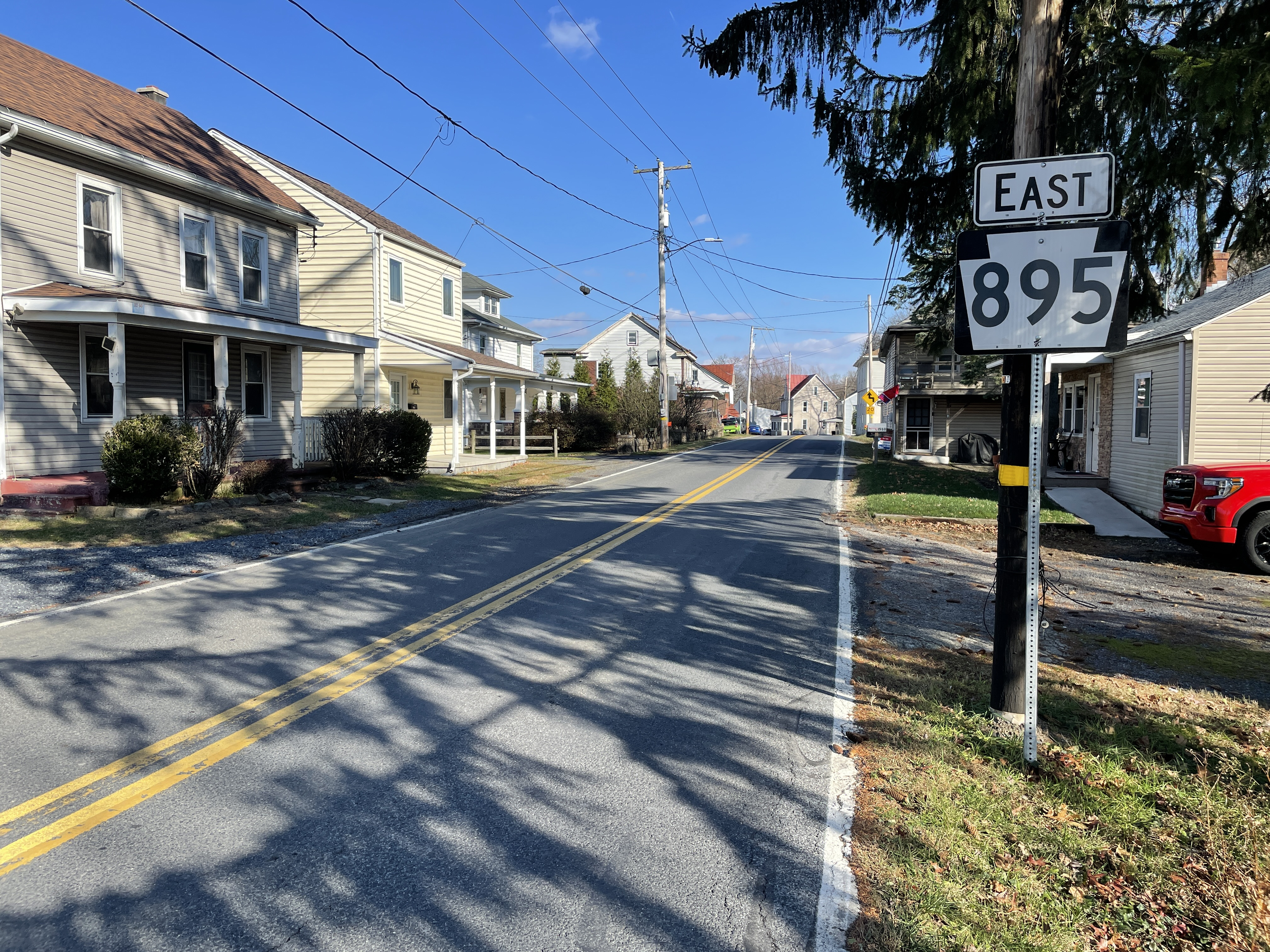
- Eastbound PA 895 (Fair Road) through Summit Station

- Location within the U.S. state of Pennsylvania Summit Station (the United States)
- Coordinates: 40°33′37″N 76°11′56″W
- Country: United States
- State: Pennsylvania
- County: Schuylkill

Area
  - Total: 1.1 sq mi (2.8 km^{2})
  - Land: 1.1 sq mi (2.8 km^{2})

Population (2000)
  - Total: 208
  - Density: 190/sq mi (74/km^{2})
- Time zone: UTC-5 (Eastern (EST))
  - Summer (DST): UTC-4 (EDT)
- ZIP code: 17979
- Area code: 570

Summit Station is a census-designated place (CDP) in Wayne Township, Schuylkill County, Pennsylvania, United States. The population is 174 as of the 2010 census.

== Geography ==
Summit Station is located at 40°33′37″N 76°11′56″W (40.560225, -76.198877).

According to the United States Census Bureau, the CDP has a total area of 1.1 square miles (2.8 km^{2}), all land.

== Demographics ==
At the 2000 census there were 208 people, 85 households, and 60 families living in the CDP. The population density was 191.9 inhabitants per square mile (74.1/km^{2}). There were 92 housing units at an average density of 84.9 per square mile (32.8/km^{2}). The racial makeup of the CDP was 97.60% White, 0.48% from other races, and 1.92% from two or more races. Hispanic or Latino of any race were 0.48%.

Of the 85 households 16.5% had children under the age of 18 living with them, 60.0% were married couples living together, 8.2% had a female householder with no husband present, and 29.4% were non-families. 22.4% of households were one person and 9.4% were one person aged 65 or older. The average household size was 2.45 and the average family size was 2.90.

The age distribution was 16.8% under the age of 18, 9.6% from 18 to 24, 30.8% from 25 to 44, 28.4% from 45 to 64, and 14.4% 65 or older. The median age was 40 years. For every 100 females, there were 89.1 males. For every 100 females age 18 and over, there were 96.6 males.

The median household income was $27,833 and the median family income was $52,639. Males had a median income of $41,111 versus $26,250 for females. The per capita income for the CDP was $16,258. None of the population or families were below the poverty line.

== Transportation ==
Summit Station is at the intersection of east–west Pennsylvania Route 895 and north–south Pennsylvania Route 183.
