= Reedsville, Schuylkill County, Pennsylvania =

Unincorporated community in Pennsylvania, US

Reedsville, Pennsylvania
- Unincorporated community
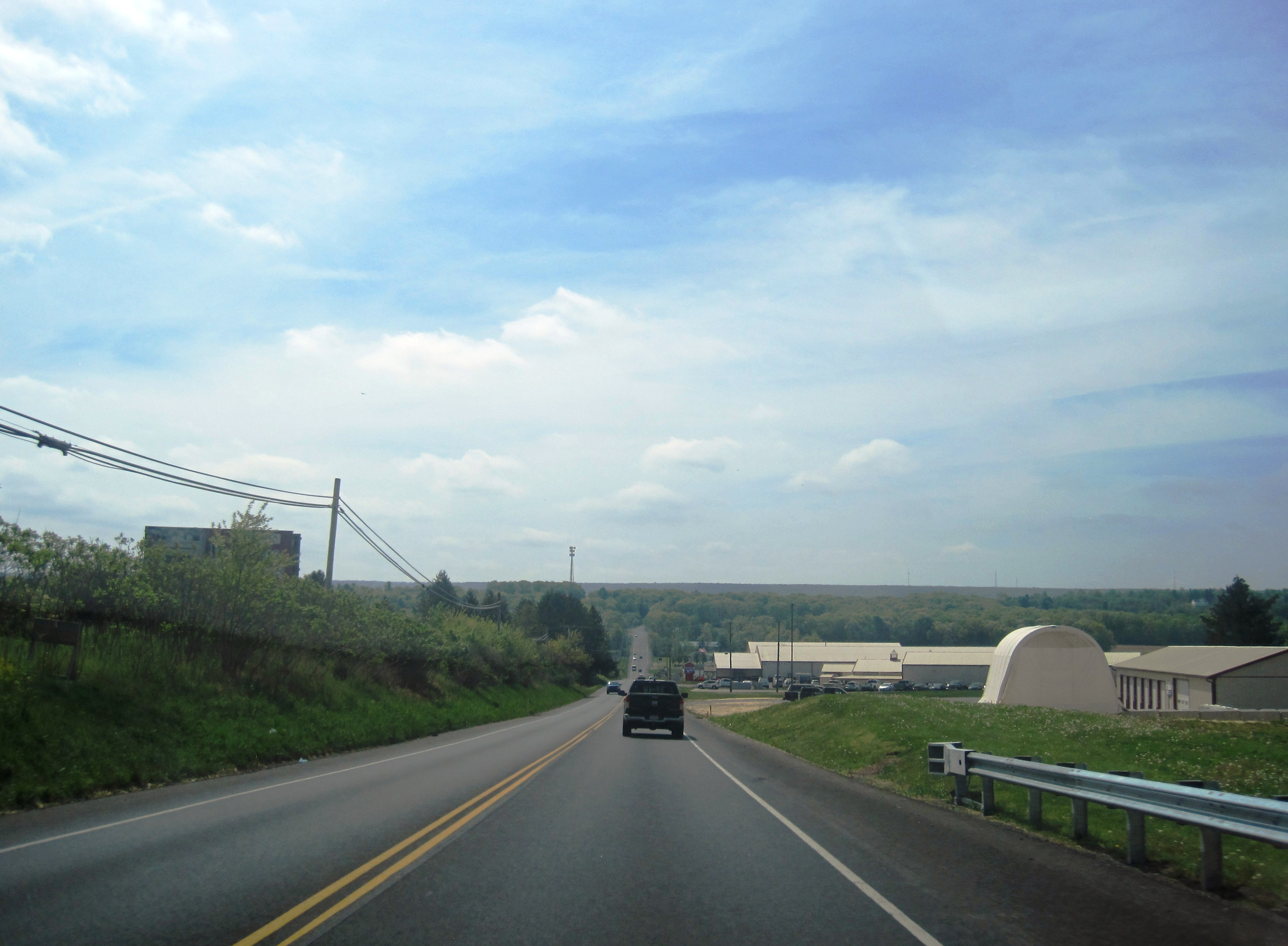
- Southbound PA 183 in Reedsville

- Location within Pennsylvania
- Coordinates: 40°34′47″N 76°12′56″W
- Country: United States
- State: Pennsylvania
- County: Schuylkill
- Township: Wayne
- Elevation: 787 ft (240 m)
- Time zone: UTC-5 (Eastern (EST))
  - Summer (DST): UTC-4 (EDT)
- Area code: 570
- GNIS feature ID: 1212324

Reedsville is an unincorporated community in Wayne Township in Schuylkill County, Pennsylvania, United States. Reedsville is located at the intersection of Pennsylvania Route 183 and Lutz Valley Road.
