= New Ringgold, Pennsylvania =

Borough in Pennsylvania, US

- Borough
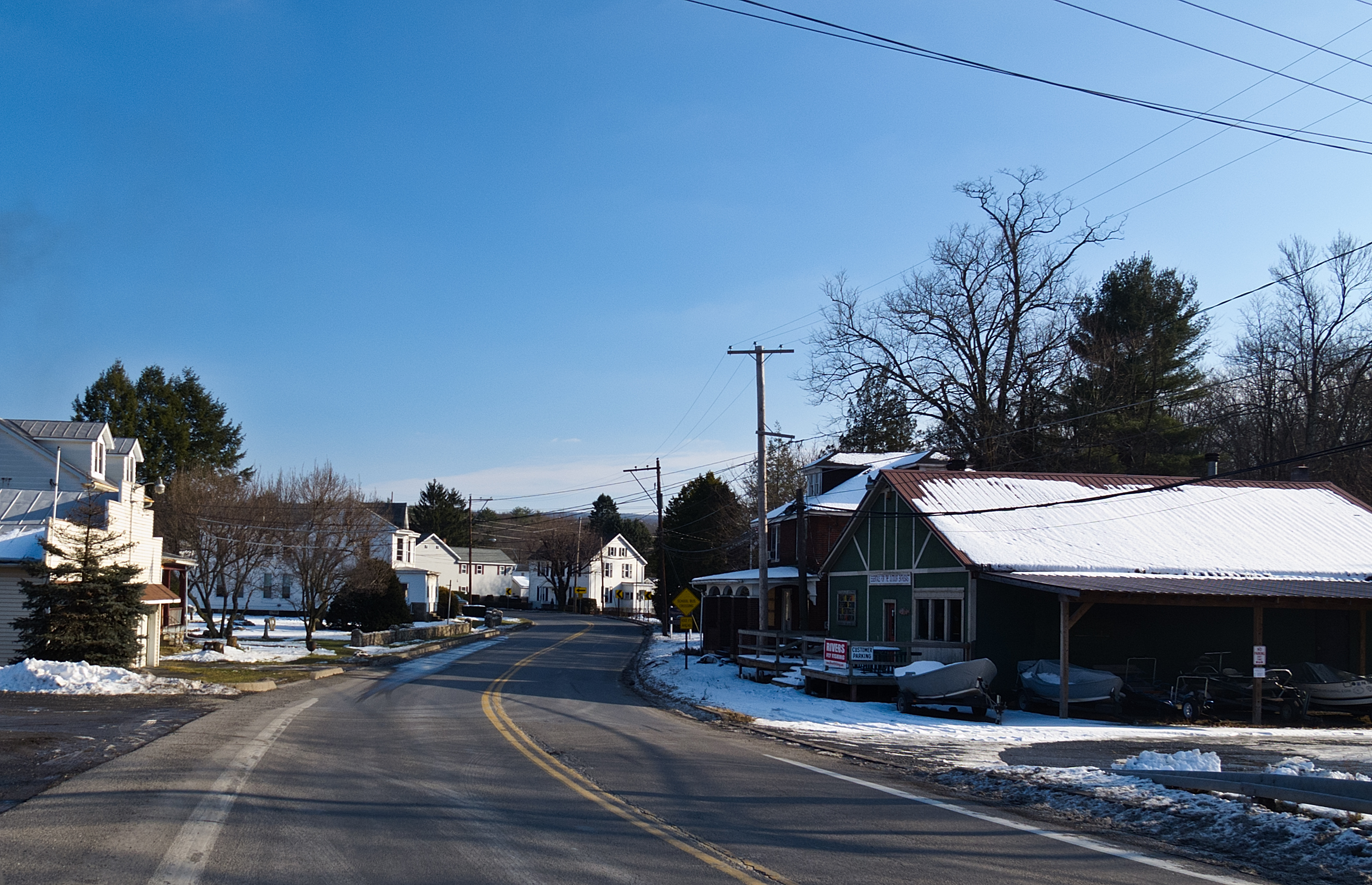
- View of entrance of New Ringgold, Pennsylvania

- Location of New Ringgold in Schuylkill County, Pennsylvania.

- Location in Pennsylvania New Ringgold (the United States)
- Coordinates: 40°41′13″N 75°59′53″W
- Country: United States
- State: Pennsylvania
- County: Schuylkill
- Settled: 1867
- Incorporated: 1877

Government
  - Type: Borough Council

Area
  - Total: 0.80 sq mi (2.07 km^{2})
  - Land: 0.80 sq mi (2.07 km^{2})
  - Water: 0 sq mi (0.00 km^{2})

Population (2020)
  - Total: 253
  - Density: 316.7/sq mi (122.27/km^{2})
- Time zone: UTC-5 (Eastern (EST))
  - Summer (DST): UTC-4 (EDT)
- ZIP code: 17960
- Area codes: 570 and 272
- FIPS code: 42-54016

New Ringgold is a borough in Schuylkill County, Pennsylvania, United States. The population was 253 at the time of the 2020 census.

ZIP Code 17960 serves the borough and portions of East Brunswick Township and West Penn Township. The town serves as a crossroad between state routes 443 and 895. The crossroads create a minor problem for trucks turning onto PA 895, because there is no stop light and cars are not required to stop.

The Reading Blue Mountain and Northern Railroad runs through the heart of the town.

== Geography ==
New Ringgold is located at 40°41′13″N 75°59′53″W (40.686969, -75.998000).

According to the United States Census Bureau, the borough has a total area of 0.9 square miles (2.3 km^{2}), all of it land.

The Little Schuylkill River flows southward through New Ringgold to meet the Schuylkill River in Port Clinton.

The borough is served by Routes 443 and 895.

New Ringgold has a hot-summer humid continental climate (Dfa) and average monthly temperatures range from 27.7 °F in January to 72.6 °F in July. The hardiness zone is 6b.

== Demographics ==
Historical population
Census	Pop.	Note	%±
1880	100		—
1890	240		140.0%
1900	228		−5.0%
1910	266		16.7%
1920	223		−16.2%
1930	245		9.9%
1940	313		27.8%
1950	302		−3.5%
1960	314		4.0%
1970	314		0.0%
1980	301		−4.1%
1990	315		4.7%
2000	291		−7.6%
2010	276		−5.2%
2020	253		−8.3%
2021 (est.)	253	Steady	0.0%

As of the census of 2000, there were 291 people, 118 households, and 82 families residing in the borough.

The population density was 340.4 inhabitants per square mile (131.4/km^{2}). There were 128 housing units at an average density of 149.7 per square mile (57.8/km^{2}).

The racial makeup of the borough was 99.66% White and 0.34% African American. Hispanic or Latino of any race were 0.69% of the population.

There were 118 households, out of which 30.5% had children under the age of eighteen living with them; 55.1% were married couples living together, 7.6% had a female householder with no husband present, and 30.5% were non-families. 25.4% of all households were made up of individuals, and 8.5% had someone living alone who was sixty-five years of age or older.

The average household size was 2.47 and the average family size was 2.95.

In the borough the population was spread out, with 21.3% under the age of eighteen, 8.2% from eighteen to twenty-four, 31.3% from twenty-five to forty-four, 23.0% from forty-five to sixty-four, and 16.2% who were sixty-five years of age or older. The median age was thirty-seven years.

For every one hundred females there were 90.2 males. For every one hundred females aged eighteen and over, there were 92.4 males.

The median income for a household in the borough was $27,083, and the median income for a family was $32,250. Males had a median income of $31,500 compared with that of $19,167 for females.

The per capita income for the borough was $13,492.

Roughly 11.1% of families and 10.2% of the population were living below the poverty line, including 13.6% of those under the age of eighteen and 7.0% of those who were aged sixty-five or older.
