= Friedensburg, Pennsylvania =

Unincorporated community in Pennsylvania, US

Friedensburg
- Census-designated place
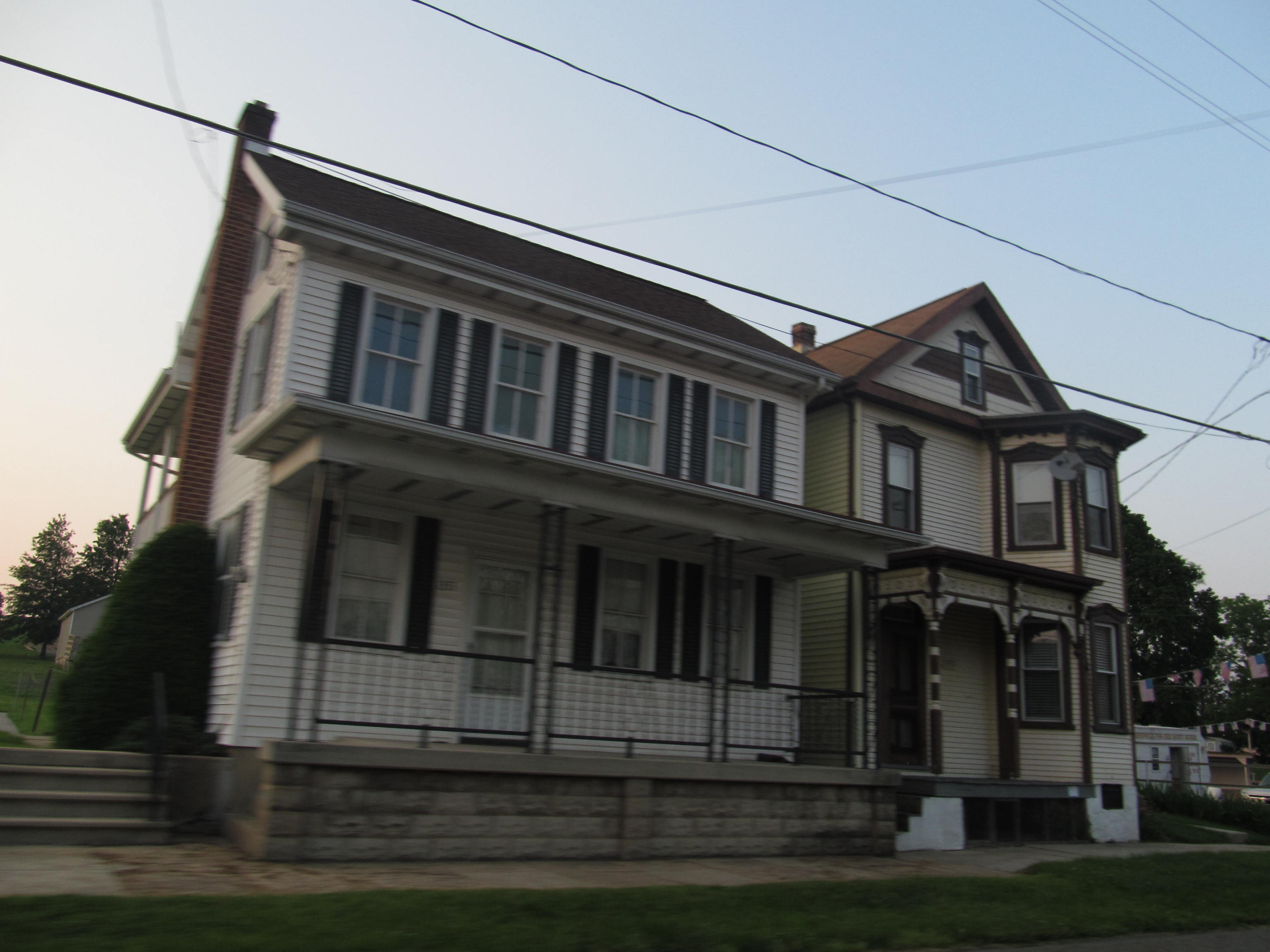

- Location within the U.S. state of Pennsylvania Friedensburg (the United States)
- Coordinates: 40°36′16″N 76°13′48″W
- Country: United States
- State: Pennsylvania
- County: Schuylkill

Area
  - Total: 1.73 sq mi (4.49 km^{2})
  - Land: 1.73 sq mi (4.49 km^{2})
  - Water: 0 sq mi (0.00 km^{2})

Population (2020)
  - Total: 1,041
  - Density: 600.8/sq mi (231.97/km^{2})
- Time zone: UTC-5 (Eastern (EST))
  - Summer (DST): UTC-4 (EDT)
- ZIP codes: 17933
- Area codes: 570 and 272
- FIPS code: 42-27936

Friedensburg is a Village and census-designated place (CDP) in Wayne Township, Schuylkill County, Pennsylvania, United States. The population was 1,041 at the time of the 2020 census.

== Geography ==
Friedensburg is located at 40°36′16″N 76°13′48″W (40.604343, -76.229900).

According to the United States Census Bureau, the CDP has a total area of 1.6 square miles (4.1 km^{2}), all land.

== Demographics ==
Historical population
Census	Pop.	Note	%±
2020	1,041		—
U.S. Decennial Census

At the 2000 census there were 828 people, 375 households, and 241 families living in the CDP. The population density was 527.2 inhabitants per square mile (203.6/km^{2}). There were 414 housing units at an average density of 263.6 per square mile (101.8/km^{2}). The racial makeup of the CDP was 99.52% White, 0.12% Native American, 0.12% from other races, and 0.24% from two or more races. Hispanic or Latino of any race were 0.60%.

Of the 375 households 23.2% had children under the age of 18 living with them, 50.7% were married couples living together, 8.5% had a female householder with no husband present, and 35.7% were non-families. 31.5% of households were one person and 16.0% were one person aged 65 or older. The average household size was 2.21 and the average family size was 2.70.

The age distribution was 19.8% under the age of 18, 5.6% from 18 to 24, 29.1% from 25 to 44, 25.4% from 45 to 64, and 20.2% 65 or older. The median age was 42 years. For every 100 females, there were 103.9 males. For every 100 females age 18 and over, there were 97.0 males.

The median household income was $33,625 and the median family income was $48,750. Males had a median income of $28,173 versus $25,714 for females. The per capita income for the CDP was $19,039. None of the families and 4.0% of the population were living below the poverty line, including no under eighteens and 4.5% of those over 64.
