= East Penn Township, Pennsylvania =

Township in Pennsylvania, US

East Penn Township
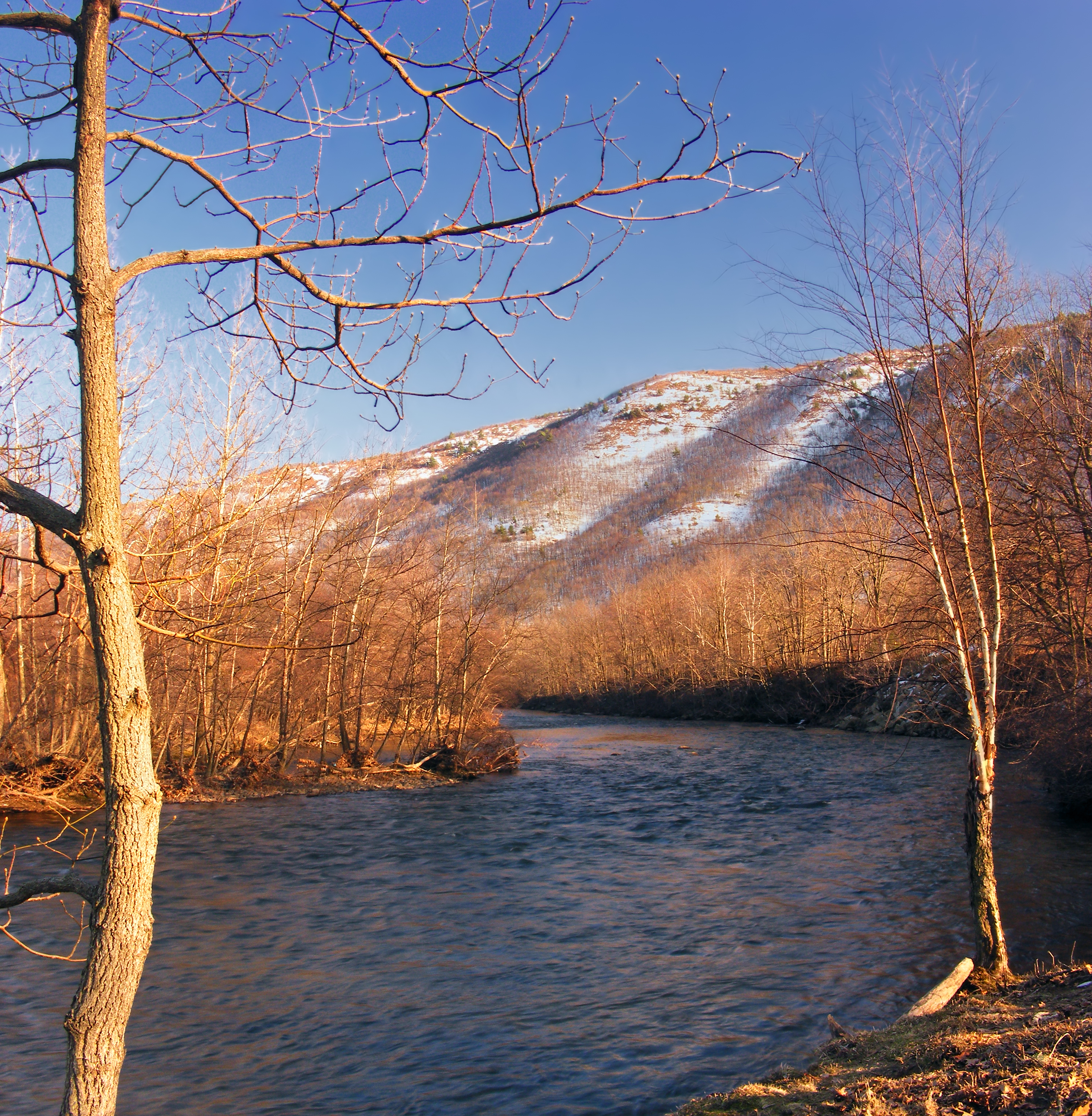
- The Lehigh River in East Penn Township in March 2010

- Flag Seal

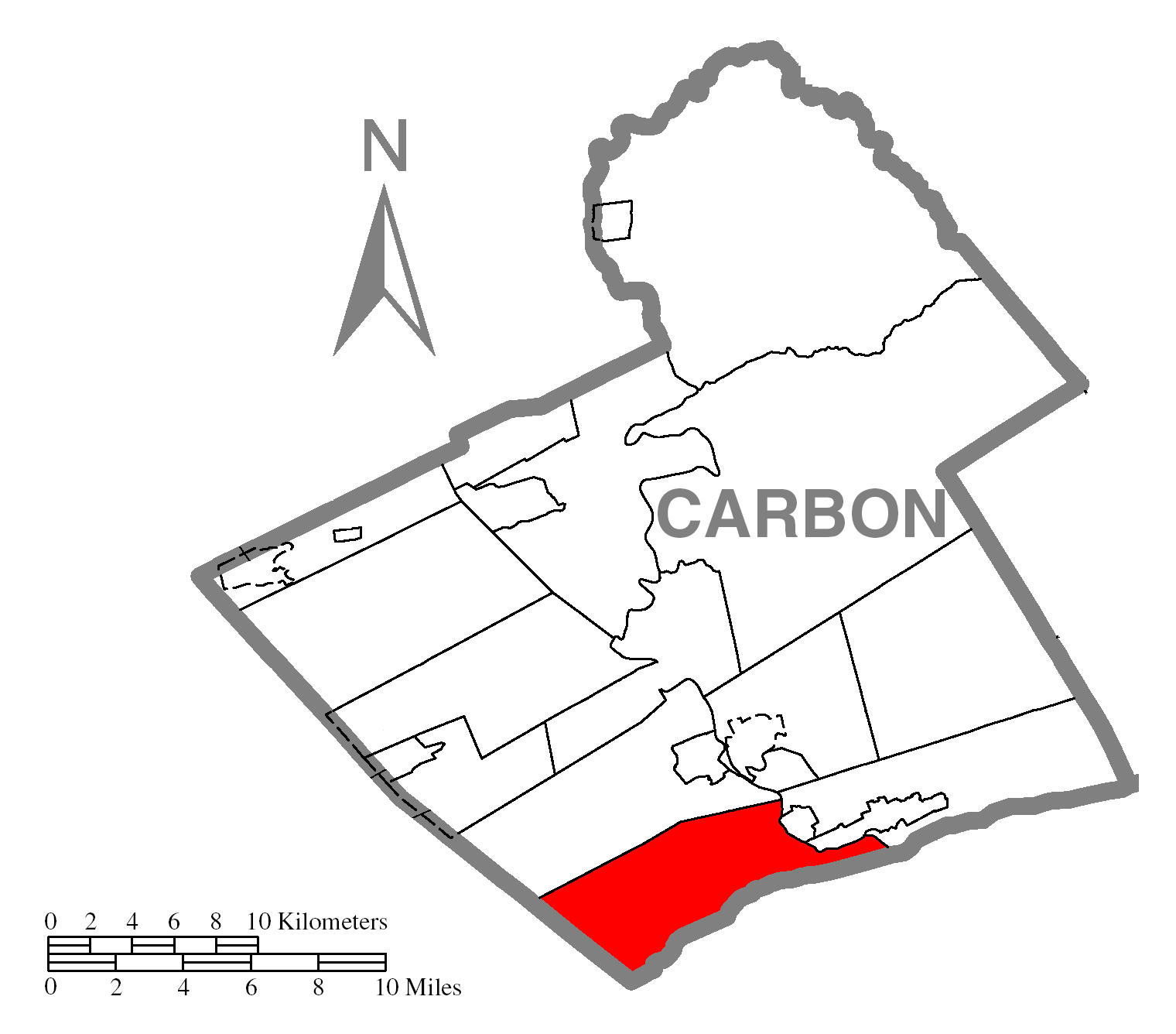
- Location of East Penn Township in Carbon County, Pennsylvania

- Location of Carbon County in Pennsylvania
- Coordinates: 40°44′30″N 75°45′05″W
- Country: United States
- State: Pennsylvania
- County: Carbon

Area
  - Total: 22.84 sq mi (59.16 km^{2})
  - Land: 22.71 sq mi (58.81 km^{2})
  - Water: 0.14 sq mi (0.35 km^{2})
- Elevation: 535 ft (163 m)

Population (2010)
  - Total: 2,881
  - Estimate (2016): 2,782
  - Density: 122.5/sq mi (47.31/km^{2})
- Time zone: UTC-5 (EST)
  - Summer (DST): UTC-4 (EDT)
- ZIP Codes: 18212, 18235, 18211
- Area codes: 570 and 610
- FIPS code: 42-025-21664
- Website: www.eastpenntownship.com

East Penn Township is a rural township in the rough uplands terrain of the eastern Mahoning Hills area of Carbon County, Pennsylvania. It is part of Northeastern Pennsylvania.

The township has a complementary or sister township, West Penn Township, directly to the west in Schuylkill County. The township sits between two ridgelines of the Ridge-and-Valley Appalachians, but with multiple hilltops, its terrain is unlike many nearby valley floors between similar ridgelines. The population was 2,881 at the 2010 United States census, up from 2,461 at the 2000 census.

== Geography ==
The township is located in the southern corner of Carbon County and is bordered by Lehigh County to the south and Schuylkill County to the west. Older USGS topographic maps show the township in a region known as the Mahoning Hills, a geologically chaotic series of hilltops surmounting a long upland more cyclic in altitude than nearby valley bottoms.

The township is drained by the Lehigh River, which flows along its northeastern boundary, with the largest tributary in the township being Lizard Creek. The southern boundary of the township follows the crest of Blue Mountain, a prominent ridge that runs across the eastern half of the state and reaches an elevation of 1,680 feet (510 m) in this area. The northern boundary runs near the broader and lower crest of Mahoning Mountain, elevation 1,150 feet (350 m). The valley floor of the township varies in elevation from 480 to 650 feet (150 to 200 m). Villages in the township include Ashfield, Germans, and West Bowmans.

According to the U.S. Census Bureau, the township has a total area of 22.9 square miles (59.2 km^{2}), of which 22.7 square miles (58.8 km^{2}) is land and 0.1 square miles (0.3 km^{2}), or 0.59%, is water.

=== Neighboring municipalities ===
- Mahoning Township (north)
- Lower Towamensing Township (east)
- Bowmanstown (east)
- Palmerton (east)
- Lehigh Township, Northampton County (tangent to the southeast)
- Washington Township, Lehigh County (south)
- Heidelberg Township, Lehigh County (south)
- Lynn Township, Lehigh County (tangent to the southwest)
- West Penn Township, Schuylkill County (west)

=== Climate ===
East Penn has a humid continental climate (Dfa/Dfb) and the hardiness zone is mainly 6a with 6b along the river and in the Lizard Valley along 895. Average monthly temperatures in Ashfield range from 27.6 °F in January to 72.4 °F in July.

== Demographics ==
Historical population
Census	Pop.	Note	%±
2010	2,881		—
2016 (est.)	2,782		−3.4%
U.S. Decennial Census

As of the 2000 census, there were 2,461 people, 947 households, and 733 families residing in the township. The population density was 109.8 inhabitants per square mile (42.4/km^{2}). There were 996 housing units at an average density of 44.4 per square mile (17.1/km^{2}). The racial makeup of the township was 98.82% White, 0.20% African American, 0.12% Native American, 0.20% Asian, 0.45% from other races, and 0.20% from two or more races. Hispanic or Latino of any race were 0.69% of the population.

There were 947 households, out of which 32.7% had children under the age of 18 living with them, 67.1% were married couples living together, 6.3% had a female householder with no husband present, and 22.5% were non-families. 18.3% of all households were made up of individuals, and 7.8% had someone living alone who was 65 years of age or older. The average household size was 2.59 and the average family size was 2.93.

In the township, the population was spread out, with 21.7% under the age of 18, 6.7% from 18 to 24, 30.2% from 25 to 44, 26.4% from 45 to 64, and 15.1% who were 65 years of age or older. The median age was 41 years. For every 100 females, there were 97.7 males. For every 100 females age 18 and over, there were 99.2 males.

The median income for a household in the township was $42,147, and the median income for a family was $47,446. Males had a median income of $32,297 versus $20,459 for females. The per capita income for the township was $17,545. About 1.0% of families and 3.4% of the population were below the poverty line, including 1.4% of those under age 18 and 5.0% of those age 65 or over.

== Transportation ==
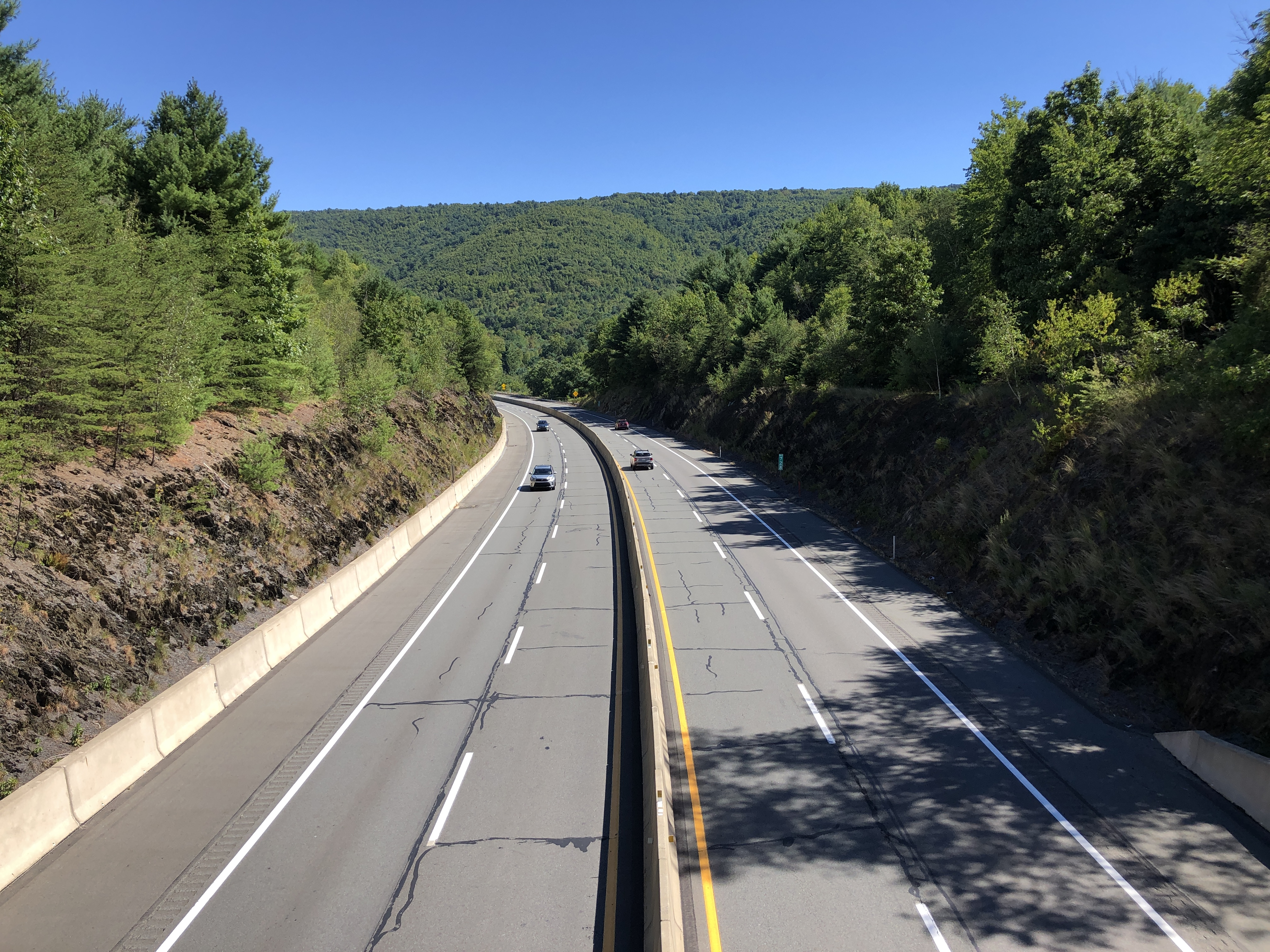
I-476/Pennsylvania Turnpike Northeast Extension southbound in East Penn Township

As of 2013, there were 56.91 miles (91.59 km) of public roads in East Penn Township, of which 2.70 miles (4.35 km) were maintained by the Pennsylvania Turnpike Commission (PTC), 14.14 miles (22.76 km) were maintained by the Pennsylvania Department of Transportation (PennDOT) and 40.07 miles (64.49 km) were maintained by the township.

Interstate 476 follows the Pennsylvania Turnpike's Northeast Extension along a northwest-southeast alignment through East Penn Township, entering the Lehigh Tunnel near the south edge of the township. However, the nearest interchange is in Franklin Township. Local access to the township is provided by Pennsylvania Route 895, which crosses the township from southwest to northeast after crossing the southern tier of Schuylkill County and ends at an interchange with Pennsylvania Route 248 across the Lehigh River in Bowmanstown. A small section of PA 248 also passes through the township, but this is an isolated segment due to a realignment of the Lehigh River near Palmerton, with no access to the rest of the township.
