= Bowmanstown, Pennsylvania =

Borough in Pennsylvania, US

- Borough
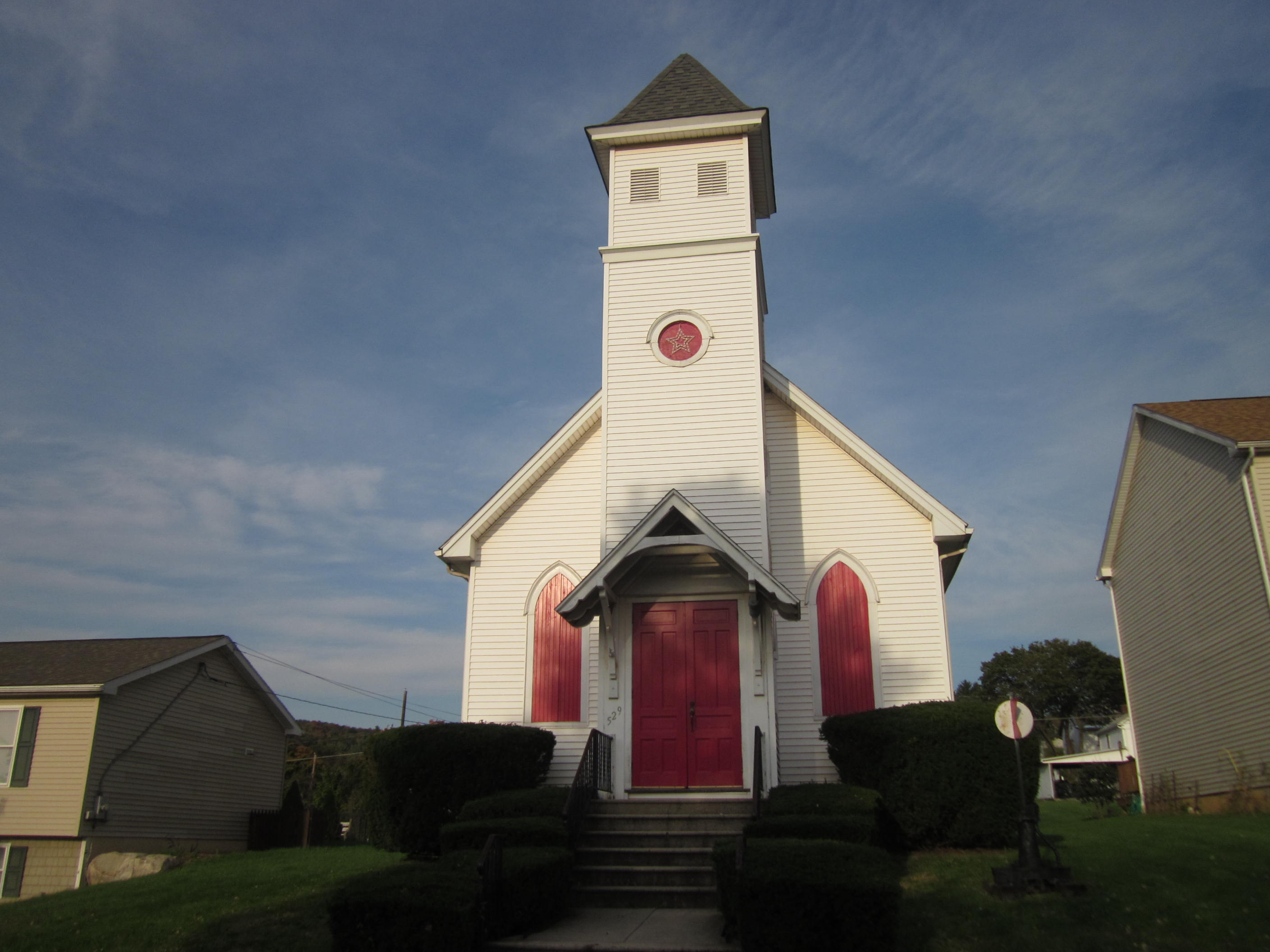

- Seal

- Location of Bowmanstown in Carbon County, Pennsylvania

- Location of Bowmanstown in Pennsylvania Bowmanstown (the United States)
- Coordinates: 40°48′03″N 75°39′44″W
- Country: United States
- State: Pennsylvania
- County: Carbon

Area
  - Total: 0.80 sq mi (2.07 km^{2})
  - Land: 0.77 sq mi (1.99 km^{2})
  - Water: 0.027 sq mi (0.07 km^{2})
- Elevation: 732 ft (223 m)

Population (2020)
  - Total: 889
  - Density: 1,155.6/sq mi (446.19/km^{2})
- Time zone: UTC-5 (EST)
  - Summer (DST): UTC-4 (EDT)
- ZIP code: 18030
- Area codes: 610 and 484
- FIPS code: 42-07880
- Website: https://bowmanstown.org/

Bowmanstown is a borough in Carbon County, Pennsylvania. It is part of Northeastern Pennsylvania. As of the 2020 census, Bowmanstown had a population of 889.

The borough is at an elevation of 437 feet (133 m). It is located 3 miles (5 km) west of Palmerton and 4 miles (6 km) south of Lehighton off Pennsylvania Route 248.

== Geography ==
Bowmanstown is located in southern Carbon County at 40°48′3″N 75°39′44″W (40.800737, -75.662167), on the northeast bank of the Lehigh River. It is bordered on the east and north by Lower Towamensing Township, on the southeast by the borough of Palmerton, and on the southwest and west by East Penn Township.

According to the U.S. Census Bureau, the borough has a total area of 0.80 square miles (2.07 km^{2}), 0.77 square miles (1.99 km^{2}) of which is land and 0.03 square miles (0.07 km^{2}), or 3.59%, of which is water.

== Transportation ==
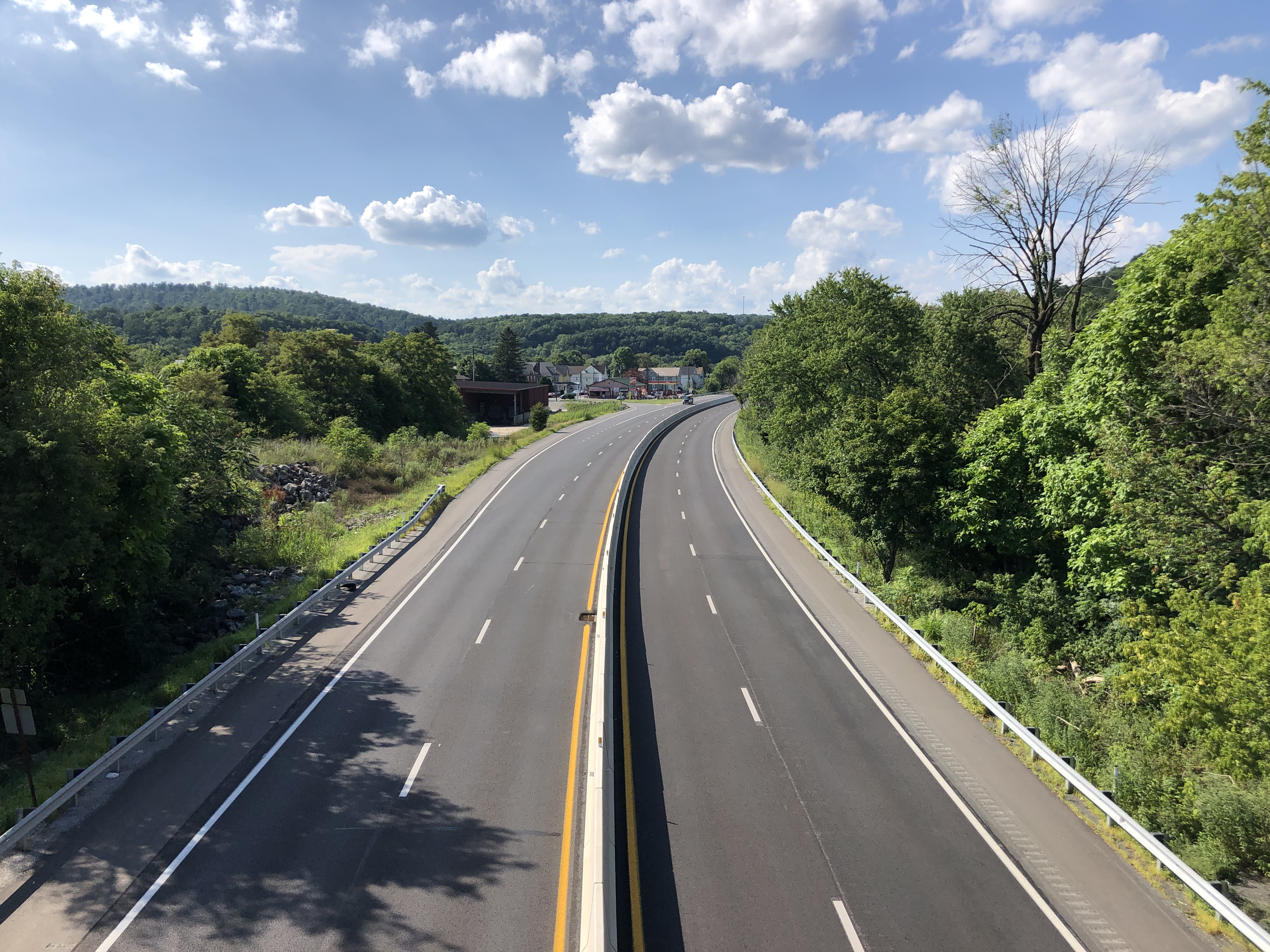
PA 248 westbound in Bowmanstown

As of 2013, there were 8.40 miles (13.52 km) of public roads in Bowmanstown, of which 3.11 miles (5.01 km) were maintained by the Pennsylvania Department of Transportation (PennDOT) and 5.29 miles (8.51 km) were maintained by the borough.

Pennsylvania Route 248 is the main highway serving Bowmanstown. It follows a northwest–southeast alignment across the southern and western portions of the borough, parallel to the Lehigh River. Pennsylvania Route 895 begins at PA 248 in Bowmanstown and heads southwestward across the Lehigh River.

== Demographics ==
Historical population
| Census | Pop. | Note | %± |
|---|---|---|---|
| 1920 | 834 | | — |
| 1930 | 843 | | 1.1% |
| 1940 | 883 | | 4.7% |
| 1950 | 878 | | −0.6% |
| 1960 | 888 | | 1.1% |
| 1970 | 864 | | −2.7% |
| 1980 | 1,078 | | 24.8% |
| 1990 | 888 | | −17.6% |
| 2000 | 895 | | 0.8% |
| 2010 | 937 | | 4.7% |
| 2020 | 889 | | −5.1% |

As of the census of 2000, there were 895 people, 389 households, and 257 families residing in the borough. The population density was 1,156.2 inhabitants per square mile (446.4/km^{2}). There were 417 housing units at an average density of 538.7 per square mile (208.0/km^{2}). The racial makeup of the borough was 99.44% White, 0.22% Asian, and 0.34% from two or more races. Hispanic or Latino of any race were 0.89% of the population.

There were 389 households, out of which 27.0% had children under the age of 18 living with them, 54.0% were married couples living together, 8.0% had a female householder with no husband present, and 33.9% were non-families. 28.5% of all households were made up of individuals, and 11.8% had someone living alone who was 65 years of age or older. The average household size was 2.30 and the average family size was 2.77.

In the borough the population was spread out, with 20.0% under the age of 18, 7.4% from 18 to 24, 29.6% from 25 to 44, 26.0% from 45 to 64, and 17.0% who were 65 years of age or older. The median age was 41 years. For every 100 females there were 92.5 males. For every 100 females age 18 and over, there were 90.4 males.

The median income for a household in the borough was $34,688, and the median income for a family was $39,018. Males had a median income of $31,845 versus $20,913 for females. The per capita income for the borough was $16,956. About 7.4% of families and 9.2% of the population were below the poverty line, including 10.5% of those under age 18 and 12.3% of those age 65 or over.
