= Lizard Creek (Pennsylvania) =

Tributary of the Lehigh River in Pennsylvania

Coordinates: 40.707648°N 75.884192°W

Lizard Creek is a 17.3-mile-long (27.8 km) tributary of the Lehigh River in Schuylkill and Carbon counties, Pennsylvania in the United States.

Lizard Creek joins the Lehigh River near the borough of Bowmanstown.

== See also ==
- List of rivers of Pennsylvania
