= Drehersville, Pennsylvania =

Unincorporated community in Pennsylvania, U.S.

Coordinates: 40°38′33″N 76°01′03″W

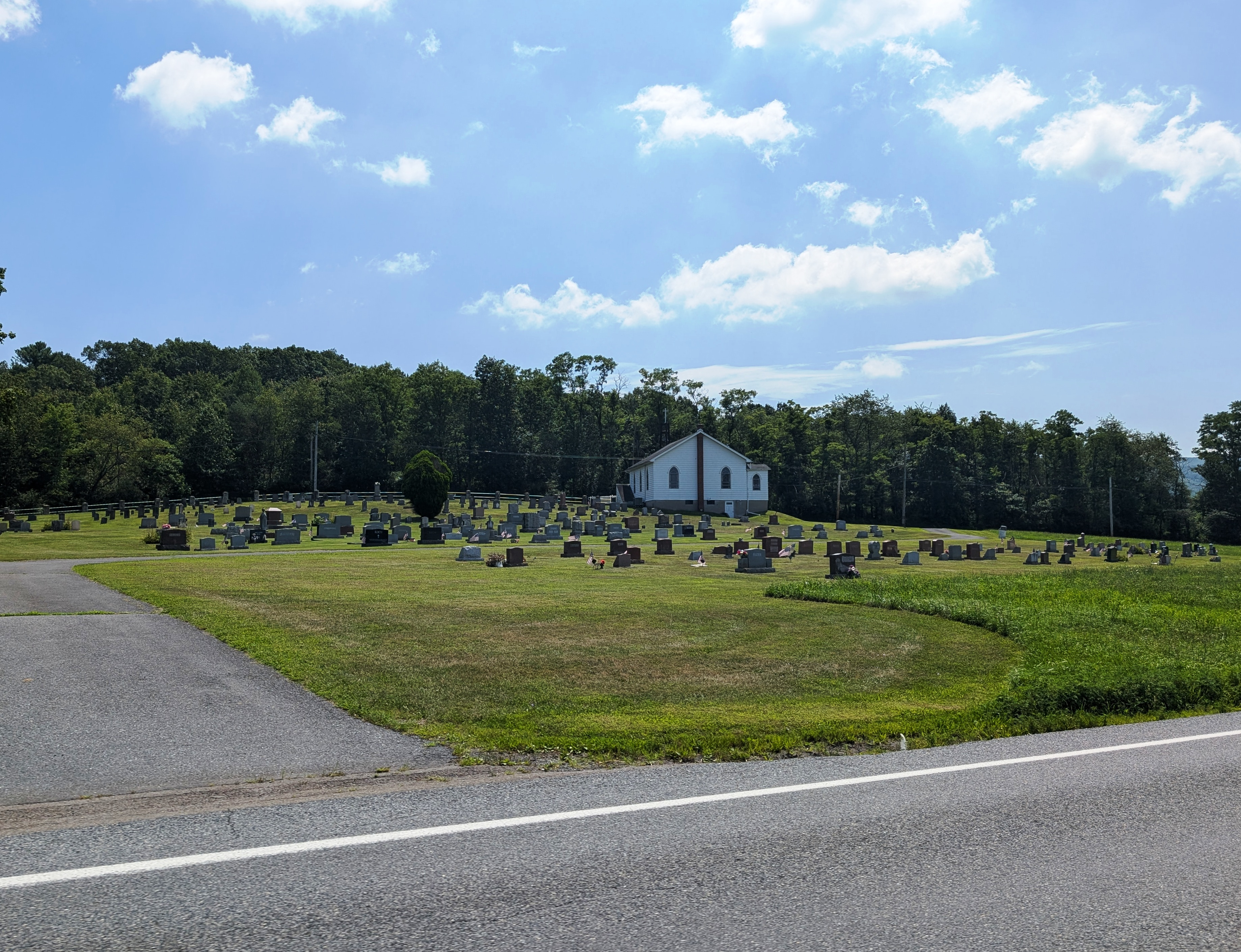
Drehersville Salem United Methodist Church, as seen from Route 895 in July 2025

Drehersville is an unincorporated community on the Little Schuylkill River and the northwestern foot of Blue Mountain in East Brunswick Township and West Brunswick Township in Schuylkill County, Pennsylvania. Drehersville was founded by William Dreher, who died in 1889.

Route 895 passes through Drehersville, which serves as a western gateway for Hawk Mountain Sanctuary. It is pronounced "DRAY-herz-vil" or occasionally "DRAIRZ-vil."

Drehersville is split between the New Ringgold and Orwigsburg post offices with the ZIP Codes of 17960 and 17961, respectively. It is served by the Blue Mountain School District. Businesses in Drehersville in the 1970s included the Hawk Mountain General Store, the Drehersville Hotel, a sawmill, and Country Sqyre's Antique Shop.
