= Indian Run (Little Schuylkill River tributary) =

Coordinates: 40°39′43″N 75°59′38″W

Indian Run is a 5.9-mile-long (9.5 km) second-order stream in East Brunswick Township, Pennsylvania. The headwater is one half mile south of Kepner, Pennsylvania, and the stream flows west for eight miles. The stream is known as a trout spawning tributary to the Little Schuylkill River at Rauschs, Pennsylvania.

== Tributaries ==
- Bear Run
- Red Run

== See also ==
- List of rivers of Pennsylvania
