= Richard H. Koch =

American judge and railroad magnate (1852–1945)

The Honorable Richard H. Koch

Personal details
- Born: Richard Henry Koch; April 2, 1852 Pottsville, Pennsylvania, U.S.
- Died: July 31, 1945 (aged 93)
- Resting place: Pottsville, Pennsylvania, U.S.
- Party: Republican
- Children: 4, including Roscoe R. Koch
- Parent(s): Daniel Koch; Mary Ann Beck Koch
- Education: State Normal School of Pennsylvania
- Profession: Trial Judge

Richard H. Koch (also known as R.H. Koch; 1852–1945) was an American judge, railroad magnate, and prominent member of the Commonwealth of Pennsylvania.

== Biography ==
Richard Henry Koch's ancestors settled Schuylkill County, Pennsylvania, in the early 1800s. Koch was born to Daniel and Mary Ann Beck Koch on April 2, 1852, in Pottsville, Pennsylvania. His mother was born in Middleport, Pennsylvania, while his father was born in East Brunswick Township on December 24, 1816. Daniel and Mary married on October 24, 1839, and together they had eleven children, one of whom was Richard.

=== Education and career ===
Koch attended the Philomathean Academy located near Birdsboro, then attended the State Normal School at Kutztown. He graduated from the SNS with first honors in his class in 1871. He went on to teach there for six years, and he did "considerable work in connection with county institutes, lecruring in Berks, Lehigh, Monroe, and Northampton counties."

In January 1887, Koch was appointed deputy district attorney in Schuylkill County. He stayed as deputy district attorney until 1890, when he was appointed district attorney. In 1892, he was nominated as a judge, but was defeated in election. Koch eventually went on to become a trial judge, deciding many cases in Pennsylvania.

In 1914, Koch was an honorary escort to the Argentinian Ambassador at the Sixteenth Annual Dinner of The Pennsylvania Society held at the Waldorf-Astoria Hotel in New York City, New York.

=== Organizations ===
Koch was elected as a member of the Historical Society of Schuylkill County on February 22, 1905.

He was also involved in a number of fraternal organizations, including: the Huguenot Lodge (No. 377); Mountain City Chapter (No. 196); Constantine Commandery (No. 41); Independent Order of Odd Fellows of Pottsville; Patriotic Order Sons of America; the Benevolent and Protective Order of Elks; Knights of the Golden Eagle; and the Royal Arcanum.

=== Family ===
On September 30, 1884, Koch married Annie S. Philips, daughter of Captain William Phillips who died in the battle of Cold Harbor. Together they had four children: Roscoe, born on June 17, 1887; Helen, born July 17, 1889; Marshall, born September 24, 1891; and Marjorie, born September 22, 1893.

Son Roscoe R. Koch became Deputy Attorney General of Pennsylvania, appointed by Attorney General Thomas J. Baldridge. He attended Pottsville High School, where he graduated with honors, then went on to attend Princeton University. Like his father, he became a lawyer. Also like his father, Roscoe was one of the directors of the Shamokin Extension Electric Railway Company. Roscoe also served as Secretary and Treasurer.

Daughter Marjorie Koch married Lieutenant John Park Hood. Together they had daughter Marjorie "Marge" Hood, who was born in Pottsville, Dec. 20, 1921. Marge married millionaire Richard Yuengling, Sr. of the Jüngling family and D.G. Yuengling & Son Brewery. Marge and Richard's son is billionaire Richard Yuengling, Jr., father of heiresses Jennifer Yuengling-Franquet, Deborah Yuengling Ferhat, Wendy Yuengling Baker, and Sheryl Yuengling.

== Railroad businesses ==
=== Pennsylvania ===
Koch was president of the Shamokin Extension Electric Railway Company, which was chartered in 1908. It was operated by the Shamokin and Edgewood Electric Railway Company. Koch also served on the board, along with son Roscoe. The vice president of the company was John Doster of Danville, Pennsylvania.

In 1895, he became vice president of the Schuylkill Electric Railway Company. Koch replaced Frederick G. Yuengling after the latter resigned. Both Koch and Yuengling were great-grandfathers of Richard L. Yuengling Jr. Eventually, Koch became president of the company.

He was a director for the Columbia and Montour Electric Railway Company.

=== Tennessee ===
Koch was on the board of a number of Tennessee railway companies:

He was President and director of the Lookout Incline & Lula Lake Railway Company. This company operated a cable line from St. Elmo to the top of Lookout Mountain.

He was President and director of the North Side Consolidated Street Railway Company, which was a reorganization of the Signal Mountain Railway Company and the Chattanooga & North Side Street Ry. Company. Their capital stock was $100,000.

He was President of the United Railways, Light & Water Company. The company owned stock in a number of other companies and built an extension from Alton Park to Rossville, Georgia.

He was President of the Lookout Point Incline Company, which was a successor to the Incline & Narrow Gauge Railway Company. The company operated a cable line from St. Elmo to the top of Lookout Mountain. Their capital stock was $100,000.

He was a director of the Chattanooga & Lookout Mountain Railway Company. This company ran from the center of Chattanooga to Lookout Mountain. Their capital stock was $250,000.

He was a director of the Rapid Transit Company of Chattanooga, whose lines connected the National Cemetery, Highland Park, Orchard Knob, Avondale, Ridgedale, East Lake, Rossville, Chickamauga Park, Hill City and Vallombrosa. The capital stock was $350,000.
