= Brunswick Township, Pennsylvania =

Brunswick Township, Pennsylvania may refer to the following:

- East Brunswick Township, Pennsylvania
- West Brunswick Township, Pennsylvania
