= East Brunswick Township =

East Brunswick Township may refer to the following townships in the United States:

- East Brunswick Township, Middlesex County, New Jersey
- East Brunswick Township, Pennsylvania
