= Pottsville Area High School =

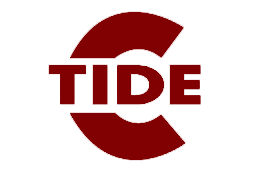

Location
- 1600 Elk Avenue; Pottsville, Pennsylvania 17901; United States; 40.6810°N 76.2143°W

Information
- Type: Public high school
- Motto: "Roll Tide"
- Established: 1853; 173 years ago
- School district: Pottsville Area School District
- Dean: Raymond Yost
- Principal: Tiffany Hummel
- Faculty: 54.16 (FTE)
- Grades: 9-12
- Enrollment: 951 (2023-2024)
- Student to teacher ratio: 17.56
- Colors: Crimson and White
- Mascot: Rip Tide
- Accreditation: Middle States Association of Colleges and Schools
- Newspaper: Tide Lines
- Yearbook: Hi-S-Potts
- Website: hs.pottsville.k12.pa.us

Pottsville Area High School is a coeducational public high school located in Pottsville, Pennsylvania. It is part of the Pottsville Area School District and is the largest public high school in Schuylkill County. It was founded in 1853 and offers a comprehensive program with an enrollment of approximately 1,000 students in ninth through twelfth grades.

Students from the neighboring Saint Clair Area School District attend the high school, with their district paying PASD tuition. The school building, with its Italian Gothic brickwork, retains its architectural and historical integrity while housing modern facilities, including four science labs, a planetarium and observatory, four computer labs, three art studios and two music studios, and two gymnasiums.

The library has a collection of 10,000 volumes, more than 40 magazine subscriptions, and access to resources throughout the state via computer systems. A formal 1,499-seat auditorium and a little theater are unique features of the building. Within the district complex are tennis courts, athletic fields, and a sports complex including a natatorium. The current high school building was constructed in 1932 and continues to stand as an example of architectural genius.

== History ==
=== 19th century ===
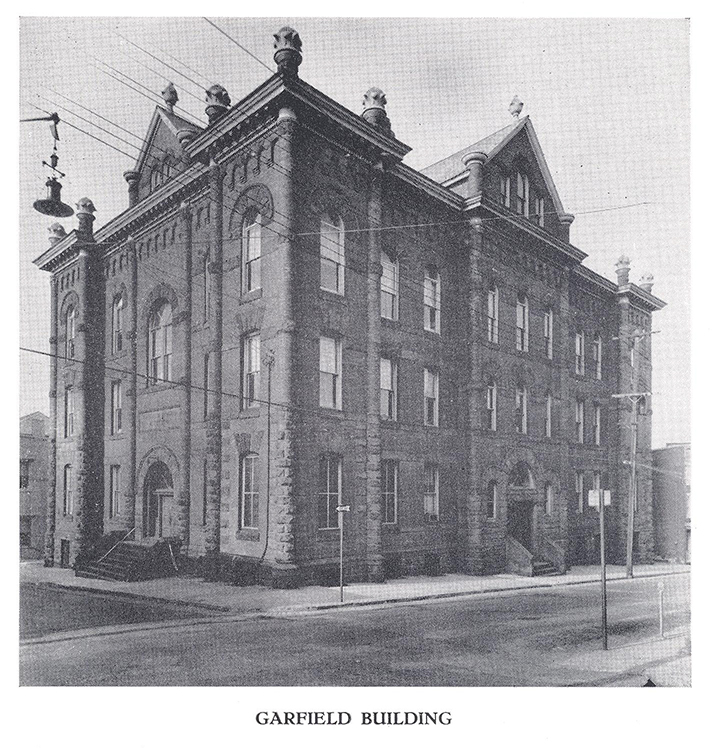
The Garfield Building served as the Pottsville High School from 1894 to 1916

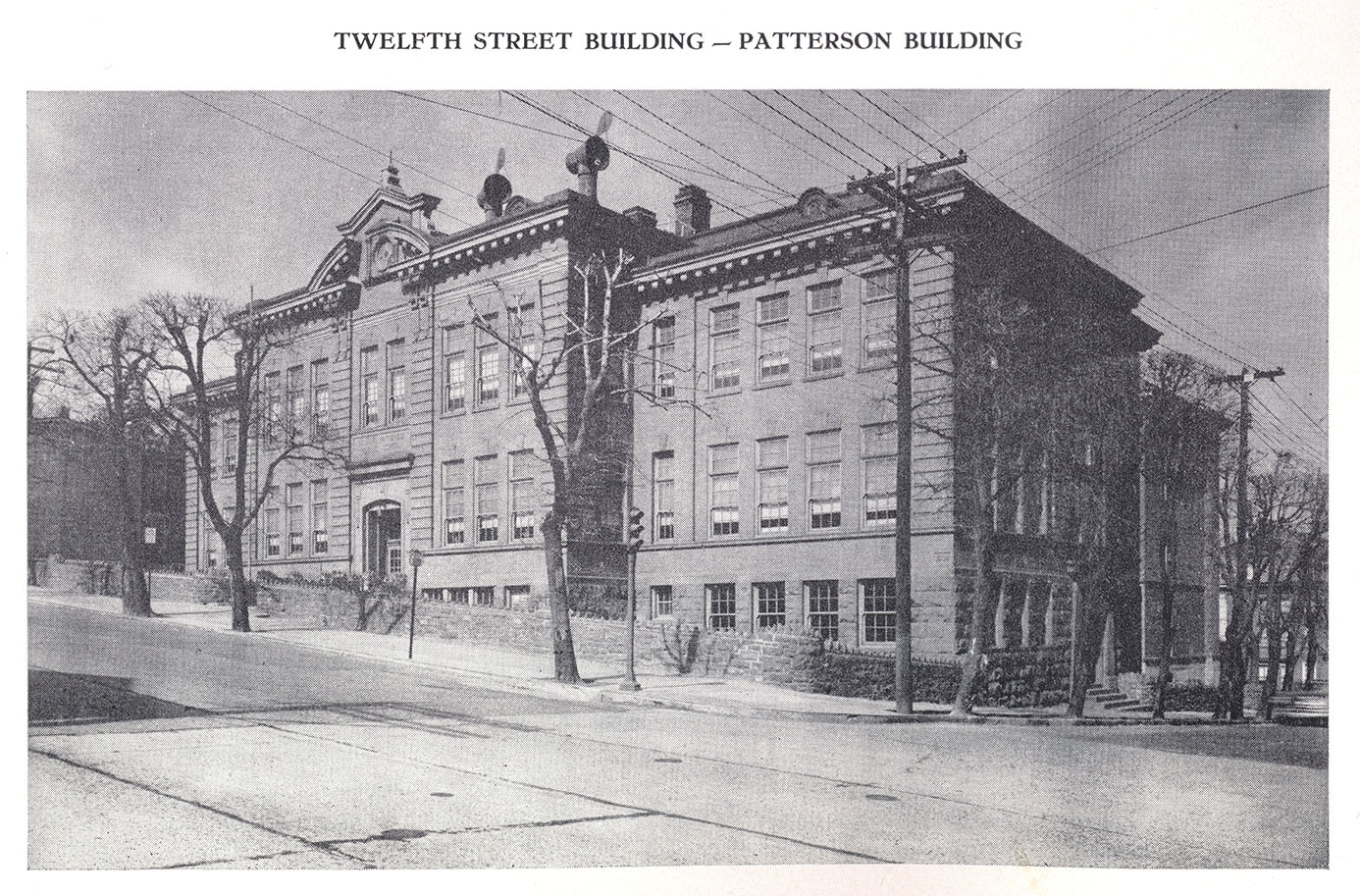
The Patterson Building served as the Pottsville High School from 1916 to 1933

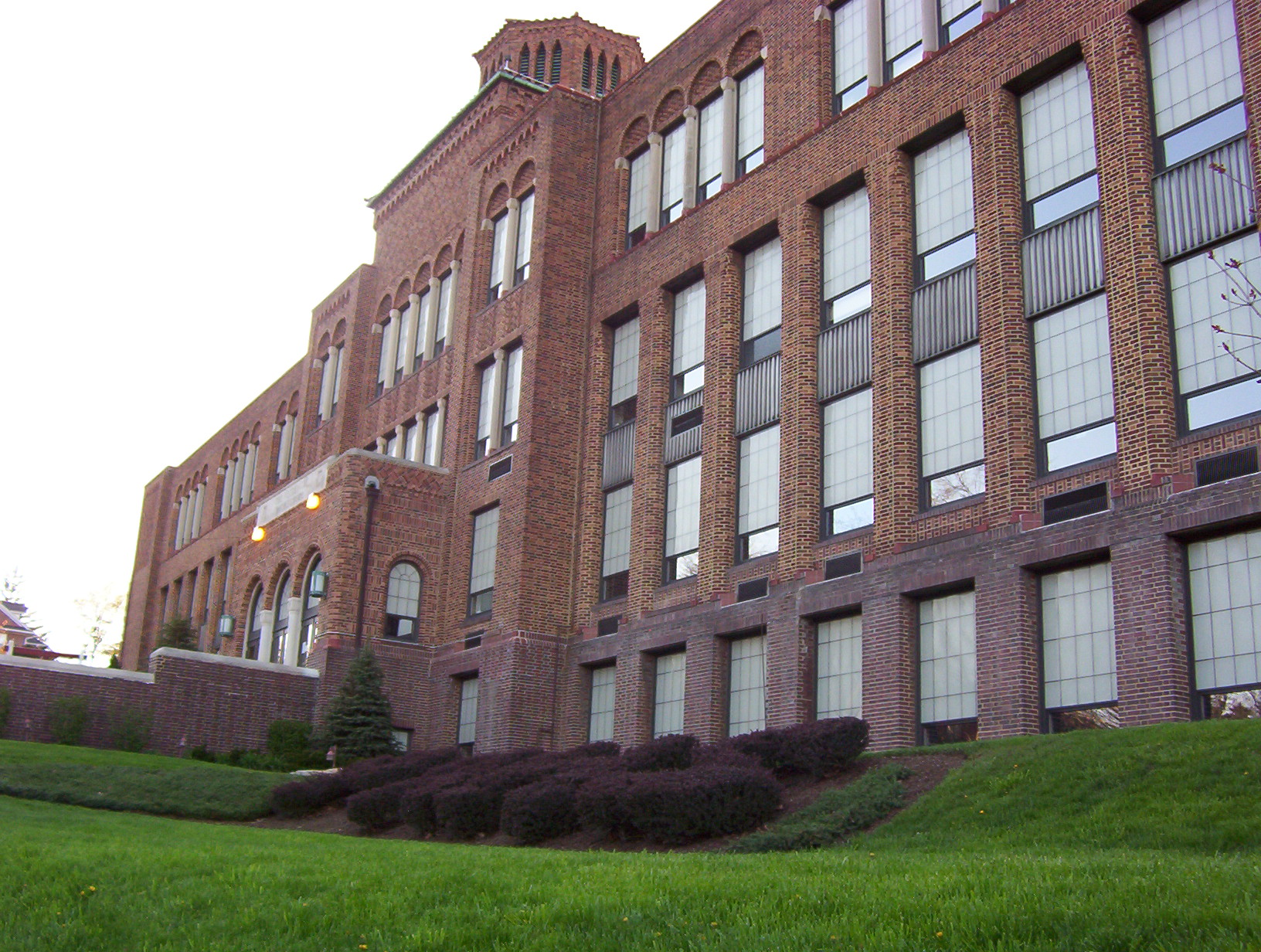
Pottsville Area High School in December 2006

The first publicly printed indication of the school board's intent to organize a high school in Pottsville appeared in a newspaper issue dated September 6, 1847. It announced that the school would open with Elias F. Perrin as principal; Monsieur F. Perrin, teacher of French and German; W. P. Koutz, of natural science, history, and elocution; and E. Sagendorf, of English. A later notation announced that Pottsville High School was to be dedicated on January 1, 1848. The above-named teachers were those who had conducted the Pottsville Academy.

On February 18, 1851, the school board advertised that applications for superintendent of schools would be received. The reply from Elias Schneider seemed to indicate definitely that the board had intended to establish a high school in September 1851, since he said in part: "I do, therefore, offer myself as a candidate for the office of a superintendent of your schools, with the expectation that the high school will be commenced next 1st of September." Mr. Schneider, who assumed his duties on April 1, 1851, received a salary of $50 a month. A report by Superintendent Schneider, on which the March 15, 1853, date of the founding of the high school is based, was received by the school board on March 3, 1853. The report asked for favorable consideration of a plan to divide the No. 1 male school. (Bunker Hill grammar school), by transferring the most advanced pupils from this room into the one above. "At present, we have a high school in reality but not in name. As we have the thing, let us have the name," Schneider's report stated. Then he continued, "A high school proper can be established without any other additional expense than the salary of a female teacher. Mr. Gotshall and I can attend to the upper classes, and the male assistant with a female can teach the others.

This arrangement would give me just about sufficient time to attend my general duties, as well as to some daily recitations." The school board of the time was faced with many problems concerning the operation of the new high school, but what they were is a matter of conjecture because historical information on the subject is meager. However, the weather did occupy the attention of the directors at a meeting on May 18, 1853, when many people petitioned the board to have only one session of school during the hot weather, from 7:30 A. M. to 1:30 P.M. A paid advertisement appearing in The Miners' Journal issue of April 26, 1851, gave the following regulations for the operation of the common schools as adopted April 10, 1851: "The hours of instruction shall be from 8 o 'clock until 12 in the morning, and from 2 P. M. until 5 in the afternoon, from the 1st of April until the 1st of October; and from 9 o 'clock until 12 in the morning and from 1 o'clock until 4 in the afternoon from the 1st of October until the 1st of April. "A vacation shall be allowed the month of August, and in the afternoon of each Saturday. The schools shall also be closed on the 1st day of January, Good Friday, in Easter week until the Tuesday following, 4th of July, and Christmas Day, and on such other days as the directors may allow."

Graduation from high school during the first eight years of its operation carried no tangible evidence of it for the boys and girls who had completed the course. According to an early newspaper clipping, the Class of 1862 was the first to receive diplomas. These went to a class of ten, seven girls and three boys. Among them were James B. Reilly (who later represented the area in Congress), Alfred J. Derr, Joseph W. Gumpfert, and Miss Wynkoop. The commencement was in the form of a public examination conducted by the faculty of the State Normal School. At the time, J. W. Roseberry was president of the school board, and Christopher Little was the secretary. The receipt of a diploma, however, didn't help the school enrollment during the Civil War period. Many scholars enlisted, and others went to work. The school became practically non-operative and higher education for Pottsville pupils virtually halted at the grammar school level.

Benjamin F. Patterson was selected as a high school principal in March 1865. On April 1, 1867, he was named superintendent, a position he held until his death in July 1906.

After the American Civil War, a committee comprising Peter W. Sheafer, William B. Wells, Christopher Little, John W. Roseberry, and David A. Smith reorganized the high school, and it was again placed on a firm basis. The P. H. S. Annual of 1905 said of the reorganization, "At this time a curriculum was adopted which has suffered little change." The then prevailing three-year course offered the following subjects: First (Junior Year) ~ History, algebra, geometry, foundation of Latin, Caesar, elocution; Second (Middle Year) ~ Geometry, physiology, literature, botany, composition, Cicero, Latin prose, Caesar, elocution, physical geography; Third (Senior Year ) ~ Physics, Cicero, Virgil, rhetoric, civics, astronomy, trigonometry, chemistry, geology, elocution.

A fourth or post-graduate year offered these subjects: Solid geometry, advanced algebra, Virgil, Cicero, prose composition, review of the three years' work in Latin, and mathematics. Elective subjects included German, French, Greek, teachers' course, and mathematics. Shortly before the school's reorganization, its location was moved to the old Academy building at Fifth and West Norwegian Streets. At the time, enrollment numbered 14 pupils. The school site was the Jackson Street building from 1876 to 1894, when it was transferred to the Garfield building at Fifth and West Norwegian Streets; then, in 1916, to the Patterson building at Twelfth and Market Streets; and finally, in January 1933, to the present location at Sixteenth Street and Elk Avenue.

Within ten years following the school's reorganization, enrollments increased. School board proceedings of the time showed the enrollment of 59 pupils and three teachers in 1873; 78 pupils and two teachers in 1878; 81 pupils and three teachers in June 1882, and 144 pupils and three teachers in November 1893. The all-time high enrollment in the school's history was 1,700 students during the 1939–40 term. During this period of rapid growth, the high school was directed by Stephen A. Thurlow, another outstanding figure in local educational circles. Thurlow was named principal in September 1881 and became superintendent in 1906 upon Patterson's death. Thurlow served as superintendent until his death on January 4, 1912.

The closing years of the Nineteenth Century marked another major step forward in Pennsylvania, making a high school education possible for many who could not otherwise afford it. The Legislature adopted the Free School Book Act, and in September 1893, all public school scholars received their textbooks without cost. Previously, high school textbooks would cost approximately $25, a large sum in those days. In commenting on the issuance of free textbooks, the P. H. S. Annual of 1894 had this to say: "The benefit to be derived from this cannot be told in a short space, but it is sufficient to say that the whole country will be benefited by graduating from the schools, intelligent and educated men and women."

=== 20th century ===
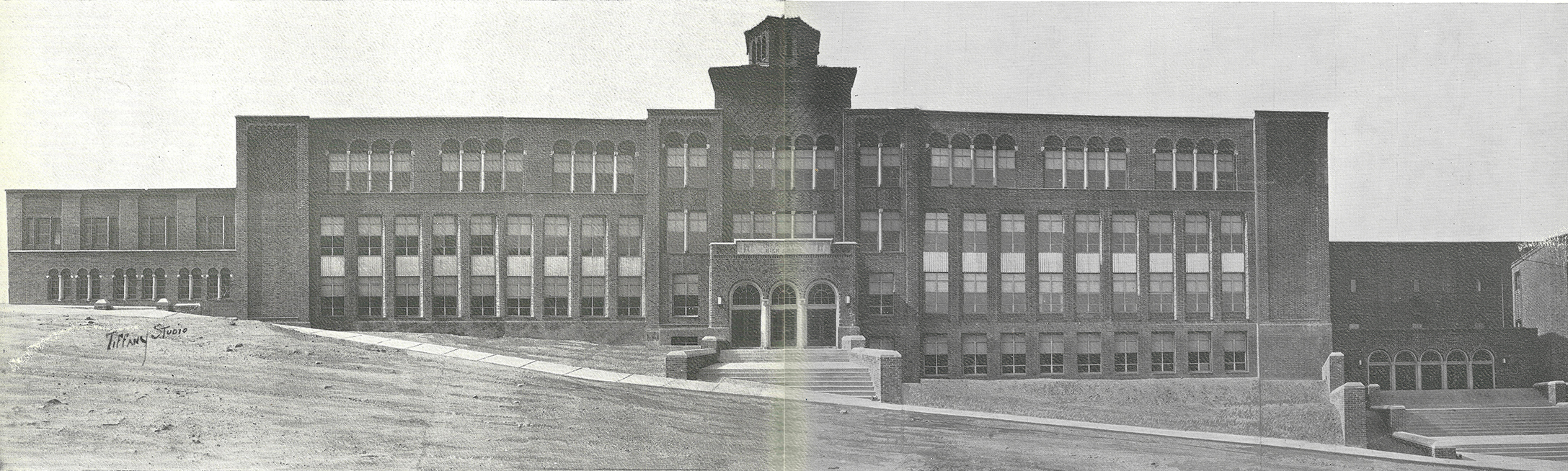
Pottsville High School, nicknamed "The Castle on the Hill," in 1932 after its completion

With the increase in the student body during the 1876-'94 period, while the school was situated in the Jackson Street building, came the first large-scale expansion of the school curriculum. A commercial department was added, but as a separate unit. On March 12, 1912, it was merged with the academic department. The beginning of the second half of the school's centennial history brought an innovation that ranked only second to the issuance of free textbooks in promoting the school's growth. This marked the inauguration of a four-year course that took effect in September 1908. The 1908 issue of the Annual related: "For some years a four-year course has been agitated for the high school, but up to this time it has received no serious attention. The visit of the State Inspector of High Schools, however, seems to have brought the matter before the minds of the board and the people in general as never before."

The Annual report stated, "A four-year course would mean much for the high school, much in the way of scholarship and in preparation for college or for immediate entrance to the business world. This expansion of the curriculum would require more space and more teachers, but surely Pottsville can afford it with its boasted wealth and love of education. Under existing conditions, we are hampered by the lack of time for such studies as rhetoric, chemistry, and astronomy, three of the most difficult and important studies in the curriculum." The Class of 1912 was the first to graduate under the four-year curriculum; there was no 1911 class, but the new educational venture brought with it new problems for the school board.

When school resumed in Fall 1914, there was not sufficient room to accommodate the pupils. Within a period of six years, the enrollment had increased from 100 to 300, and fully 100 more were listed for the 1914-'15 term. A number of plans were considered by the school board, among them a suggestion that a new building be erected at Nineteenth and Market Streets or that the Garfield building, then the site of the high school, be enlarged by adding another story. The most practical idea, however, seemed to be the one proposed for enlarging the Patterson building at Twelfth Street to accommodate the high school pupils. Architect F. X. Reilly drew up plans to enlarge the Patterson building; Contractor Wertley was awarded the contract for $44,250, and on September 29, 1916, the new school opened with an enrollment of 500 pupils.

With the outbreak of World War I, public opinion forced the school authorities to replace German with Spanish in the language department and to inaugurate an ROTC unit. An ROTC auxiliary was also formed, with every girl in the school enrolled in the unit. The training course was discontinued in 1921, and the question of new quarters for the high school again came to the attention of the school board and the public. The electorate defeated the initial plan for a new building by a 3534–1804 vote at a special election on November 5, 1924. In December 1930, the public voted 2449 to 1521 in favor of a $900,000 loan to build the present school on the site then known as Fisher's Farm. The school was ready for occupancy in January 1933.

The new school building, in its design, is an adaptation of Italian-Gothic brickwork. Its beauty is enhanced by the large, irregular, and commanding site in which it stands, and by the variety of exterior design that reflects the manifold activities of a modern school building. Due to the different grade levels, the structure evolves gradually from a three-story building on the west to a five-story plant on the east. It is planned, however, so that the two gymnasiums on the west, the general offices at the central entrances, the auditorium on the east, and the cafeteria underneath all have ground-floor entrances.

In February 1959, Veterans' Memorial Stadium, Pottsville High School's stadium, experienced numerous cave-ins because it was built on the site of the old York Farm Colliery, whose mining operations had covered the area. A sinkhole developed underneath the Press Box that was 18 feet in depth and eight feet in diameter. It was thought to compromise the integrity of the symbolic press box as well as the structure of the home side bleachers. Similar cave-ins occurred in 1937 when the east end of the stadium was deemed unstable and suffered collapses and required numerous tons of fill to render the field safe for athletic competition.

In 1966, a planetarium-observatory was added to the school's 3rd Floor. The planetarium was installed in what was the East Study Hall area and seats 72 observers, while the observatory located on the roof of the East Wing can accommodate 20 observers. The planetarium features a star projector manufactured by Spitz Laboratories, Inc., of Yorklyn, Delaware which is capable of producing night skies featuring stars, the Solar System, coordinates, and the Earth's geography. In order to accommodate the planetarium, the East Study Hall was partitioned off for the installation of a dome measuring 30-foot in diameter and two stairwells leading to the telescope in the observatory. This project was the first of its kind at the time and was approved under the Federal Elementary and Secondary Education Act, Title One. Contracting for the construction was handled by Scheider & Davis for $119,000 in 1966. The first director of the facility was Wayne L. Smiley, a graduate of Oswego State College, New York. This unique space science lab is a significant part of the science facilities of the Pottsville High School.

In 1989, the St. Clair School District, in collaboration with the Pottsville School District, decided that 230 high school students from St. Clair, Pennsylvania as well as all future students in the 9th through 12th grades would transfer to the newly named Pottsville Area High School on a tuition based model. The decision initially faced opposition from the Pennsylvania Labor Relations Board and the St. Clair Teachers Association, but was ultimately upheld and the arrangement still is in place today.

== Extracurricular activities ==
=== Performing arts ===
- Marching and Concert Band: Pottsville is home to a marching band, concert band, and jazz band.

== Athletics ==
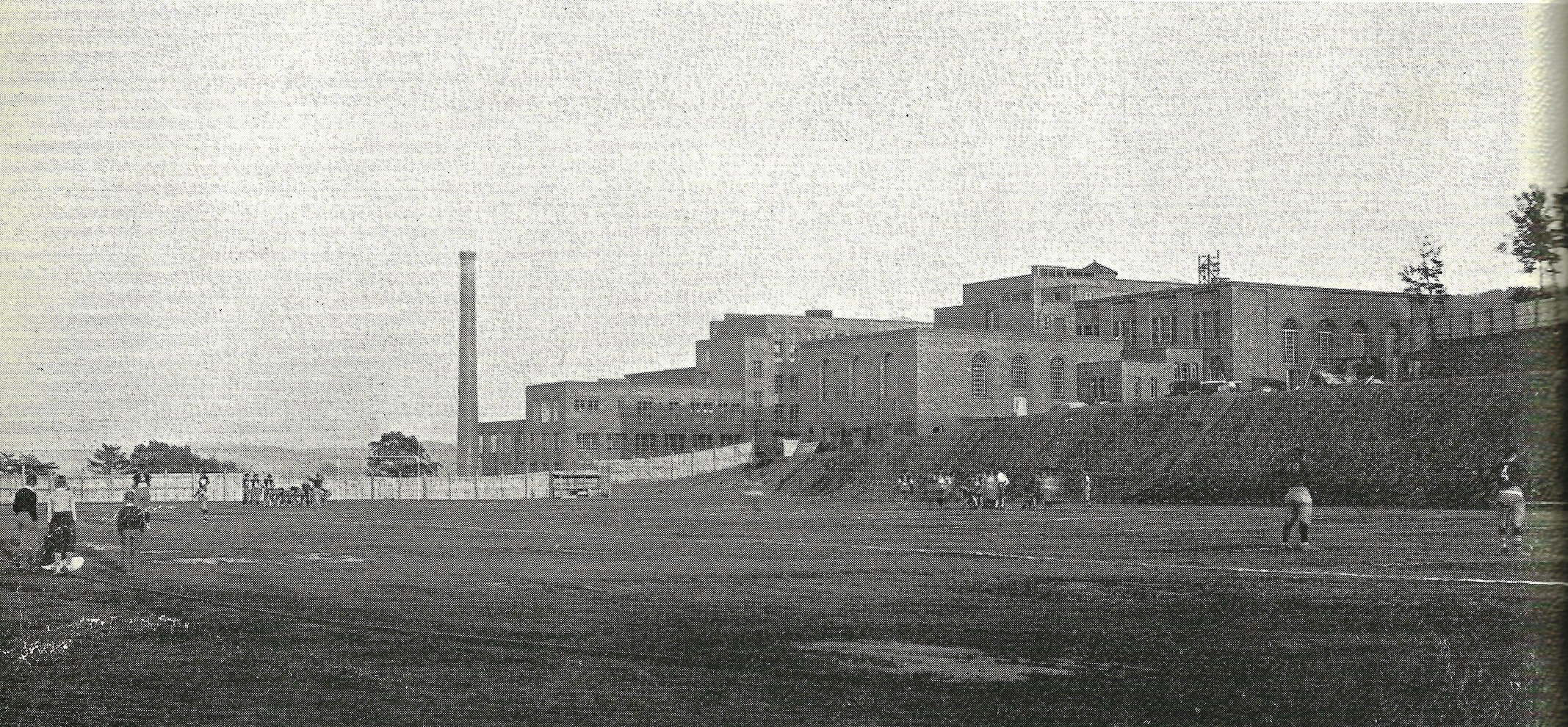
Veteran's Memorial Stadium and the newly constructed Pottsville High School in 1933

Pottsville Area High School has a longstanding football tradition dating back to the days of the Pottsville Maroons. Historically, Pottsville Area High School's primary football rival is Reading High School. The two schools compete annually for a trophy known as "The Rock" (in reality, a large chunk of coal). However, the two schools have not competed since the 2015-2016 season. Pottsville won the final game in this rivalry series 34-14. Pottsville's biggest football rivalry is now Blue Mountain High School.

Much like football, Pottsville's biggest rival for all other sports is Blue Mountain High School, known as the "Clash of 61", as the two schools are separated by less than five miles and are the two largest schools in Schuylkill County.

=== Boys ===
- Baseball
- Basketball
- Cross Country
- Football
- Golf
- Soccer
- Swimming and Diving
- Tennis
- Track and Field
- Wrestling

=== Girls ===
- Basketball
- Cross Country
- Golf
- Soccer
- Swimming and Diving
- Softball
- Tennis
- Track and Field
- Volleyball

Girls' teams participate under the nickname "Lady Tide".

== See also ==
- Pottsville Area School District
