= Saint Clair Area School District =

School district in Pennsylvania

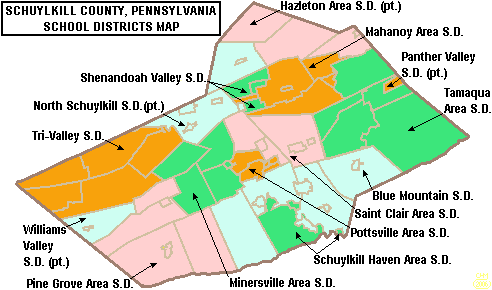
- Location of Saint Clair Area School District in Schuylkill County, Pennsylvania

Address
- 227 South Mill Street Saint Clair, Schuylkill County, Pennsylvania, 17970-1338; United States

District information
- Type: Public
- Affiliation: Pottsville Area School District

Students and staff
- District mascot: Saint the St. Bernard

Other information
- Website: www.saintclairsd.org

The St. Clair Area School District is a diminutive, suburban public school district in Schuylkill County, Pennsylvania. Centered on the borough of St. Clair, it also encompasses the boroughs of Middleport and New Philadelphia, plus the townships of Blythe Township, New Castle Township, and East Norwegian Township. The district is one of the 500 public school districts of Pennsylvania. Saint Clair Area School District encompasses approximately 48 square miles (120 km^{2}). According to 2000 federal census data, it served a resident population of 7,020. By 2010, the U.S. Census Bureau reported that the district's resident population declined to 6,695 people. The educational attainment levels for the St. Clair Area School District population (25 years old and over) were 82.6% high school graduates and 9.8% college graduates.

St. Clair Area School District operates one school that provides Kindergarten through 8th grades. High school students attend Pottsville Area High School through an agreement under which Saint Clair Area School District pays tuition for each student. Saint Clair Area School District provides transport for the students to and from Pottsville Area School District High School.

St. Clair Area School District has an extensive staff for hearing-impaired students. The Schuylkill Intermediate Unit IU 29 provides the school with a wide variety of services like specialized education for disabled students and hearing, speech and visual disability services and professional development for staff and faculty.

== Extracurriculars ==
The district provides taxpayer-funded musical instrument lessons. There is a school band.
