= Daniel Koch =

Daniel Koch may refer to:

- Daniel Koch (physician) (born 1955), Swiss physician
- Daniel Koch (politician) (1816–1903), American politician
- Dan Koch, American guitarist

== See also ==
- Wilhelm Daniel Joseph Koch (1771–1849), German physician and botanist
