= Orwigsburg, Pennsylvania =

Borough in Pennsylvania, US

Orwigsburg
- Borough
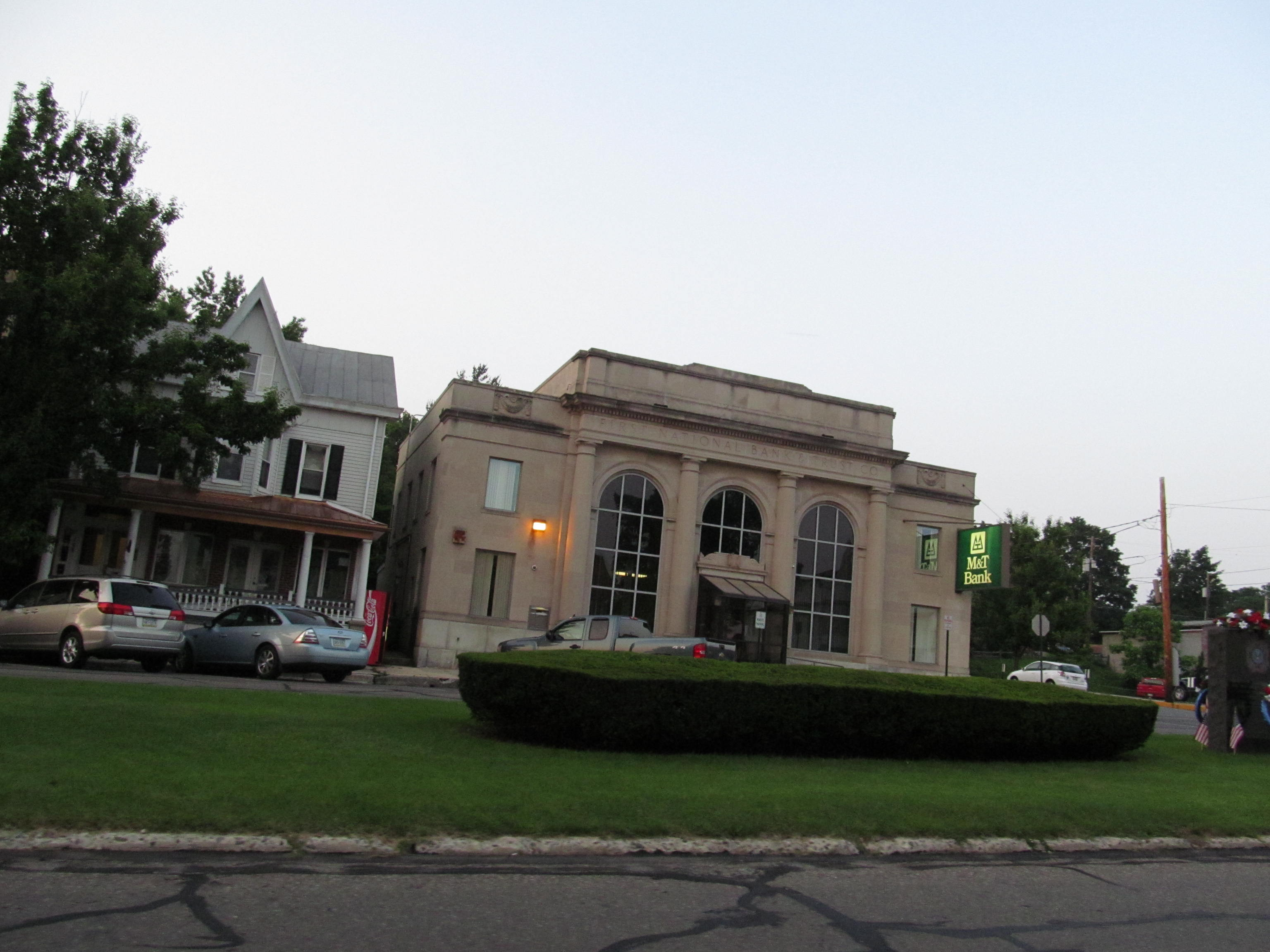
- Orwigsburg in May 2012
- Etymology: Peter Orwig
- Nickname: "O' burg"
- Location of Orwigsburg in Schuylkill County, Pennsylvania

- Location of Orwigsburg in Pennsylvania and the United States Orwigsburg (the United States)
- Coordinates: 40°39′24″N 76°6′7″W
- Country: United States
- State: Pennsylvania
- County: Schuylkill
- Founded: 1796
- Founded by: Peter Orwig

Government
  - Mayor: Barry Berger

Area
  - Total: 2.17 sq mi (5.62 km^{2})
  - Land: 2.17 sq mi (5.62 km^{2})
  - Water: 0 sq mi (0.00 km^{2})

Population (2020)
  - Total: 3,002
  - Density: 1,382.7/sq mi (533.88/km^{2})
- Time zone: UTC-5 (EST)
  - Summer (DST): UTC-4 (EDT)
- ZIP Code: 17961
- Area code: 570
- FIPS code: 42-57184
- Website: orwigsburg.gov

Orwigsburg is a borough in Schuylkill County, Pennsylvania. The borough was named for its founder, Peter Orwig, in 1796. Orwigsburg was the original county seat until the seat was moved to Pottsville in 1851.

The population was 3,002 at the time of the 2020 census.

== Geography ==
Orwigsburg is located at 40°39′24″N 76°6′7″W (40.656567, -76.101882). According to the U.S. Census Bureau, the borough has a total area of 2.2 square miles (5.7 km^{2}), all of which is land.

It has a hot-summer humid continental climate (Dfa) and average monthly temperatures range from 27.4 °F in January to 72.3 °F in July. The hardiness zone is 6b.

== Demographics ==
Historical population
Census	Pop.	Note	%±
1830	773		—
1840	779		0.8%
1850	909		16.7%
1860	828		−8.9%
1870	728		−12.1%
1880	792		8.8%
1890	1,290		62.9%
1900	1,518		17.7%
1910	1,801		18.6%
1920	1,985		10.2%
1930	2,031		2.3%
1940	2,182		7.4%
1950	2,309		5.8%
1960	2,131		−7.7%
1970	2,661		24.9%
1980	2,700		1.5%
1990	2,780		3.0%
2000	3,106		11.7%
2010	3,099		−0.2%
2020	3,000		−3.2%
2021 (est.)	2,998	▼	−0.1%

As of the census of 2000, there were 3,106 people, 1,158 households, and 795 families living in the borough.

The population density was 1,419.3 inhabitants per square mile (548.0/km^{2}). There were 1,217 housing units at an average density of 556.1 per square mile (214.7/km^{2}).

The racial makeup of the borough was 97.71% White, 0.32% African American, 0.03% Native American, 1.09% Asian, 0.06% Pacific Islander, 0.23% from other races, and 0.55% from two or more races. Hispanic or Latino of any race were 0.55% of the population.

There were 1,158 households, out of which 31.6% had children under the age of 18 living with them, 56.8% were married couples living together, 9.0% had a female householder with no husband present, and 31.3% were non-families. 27.6% of all households were made up of individuals, and 13.6% had someone living alone who was 65 years of age or older.

The average household size was 2.42 and the average family size was 2.98.

In the borough, the population was spread out, with 22.6% under the age of 18, 5.4% from 18 to 24, 26.1% from 25 to 44, 21.2% from 45 to 64, and 24.6% who were 65 years of age or older. The median age was 42 years.

For every 100 females there were 82.0 males. For every 100 females age 18 and over, there were 76.8 males.

The median income for a household in the borough was $42,400, and the median income for a family was $55,313. Males had a median income of $42,438 compared with that of $27,167 for females.

The per capita income for the borough was $22,538.

Roughly 2.5% of families and 2.7% of the population were below the poverty line, including 0.7% of those under age 18 and 4.9% of those age 65 or over.

== Education ==
Public education in Orwigsburg is provided by Blue Mountain School District. Students in grades nine through 12 attend Blue Mountain High School in Orwigsburg.
