= Roscoe R. Koch =

American politician

Roscoe Richard Koch
- Koch c. 1923
- Born: June 17, 1887; Pottsville, Pennsylvania, US
- Died: November 25, 1963 (aged 76)
- Education: Pottsville High School; Princeton University
- Occupation: Lawyer
- Known for: Deputy Attorney General of Pennsylvania
- Political party: Republican
- Parent(s): Richard H. Koch; Annie S. Phillips
- Relatives: Daniel Koch (grandfather)

Roscoe R. Koch (June 17, 1887 - November 25, 1963) was an American politician, serving as special assistant to the Attorney General of the United States and then Deputy Attorney General of Pennsylvania in the 1920s.

== Biography ==
Roscoe Richard "Ros" Koch was born to railroad magnate Richard H. Koch and Annie S. Philips on June 17, 1887. His paternal grandfather was politician Daniel Koch. He attended Pottsville High School, where he graduated with high honors. From there, he attended Princeton University, where he graduated in 1909.

In June 1915, Koch married M. Louise Smyth of Pottsville. She was born July 21, 1888, and died September 22, 1946. She is buried in the Charles Baber Cemetery in Pottsville, with her headstone bearing the inscription "Wife of Roscoe R. Koch". Together they had children Richard and Mary.

Son Richard H. Koch II who was born March 2, 1918. Richard also attended Princeton University and graduated summa cum laude. He first married Jacqueline Bloch, which resulted in sons Stephen, Chapin, and Jeremy. After their divorce, he married Joanne Godbout, executive director of the Film Society of Lincoln Center. No children resulted from that marriage, but Joanne had previously had daughter Andrea Godbout, giving Richard a stepdaughter. Richard died on June 20, 2009.

Daughter Mary Louise "Molly" Koch attended Vassar College. She started at the college in 1942 after having made her debut to the social scene at a dinner-dance just before her departure. At Vassar, one of Mary's extra curricular activities was leading people in chapel service.

After the death of his first wife, Koch married Margaret Watson Thomas. They had no children together. Margaret survived Koch when he died on November 25, 1963, in the Bryn Mawr Hospital. He died of complications with Parkinson's disease after "his health had shown a steady and progressive deterioration."

=== Business ===
Koch followed his father into law and was admitted to the Pennsylvania State Bar in 1919, after which he practiced in Pottsville.

Koch was secretary and treasurer at the Shamokin Extension Electric Railway Company which was chartered in 1903. His father Richard was the president with John P. Taylor from Pottsville acting as vice president. Along with his father and three others, Koch was also listed as a director of the company.

== Politics ==
In 1924, Koch was appointed as a special assistant to the Attorney General of the United States. He remained in that position until December 1925. In 1927, Koch was sworn in as Deputy Attorney General of Pennsylvania by Attorney General Thomas J. Baldridge.
