= Rauschs, Pennsylvania =

Unincorporated community in Pennsylvania, US

Rauschs
- Unincorporated community
- Location of Rauschs in Pennsylvania Rauschs (the United States)
- Coordinates: 40°39′52″N 75°59′33″W
- Country: United States
- State: Pennsylvania
- County: Schuylkill
- Elevation: 545 ft (166 m)
- Time zone: UTC-5 (Eastern (EST))
  - Summer (DST): UTC-4 (EDT)
- ZIP codes: 17960
- Area code: 570
- GNIS feature ID: 1184707

Rauschs is an unincorporated community and coal town in East Brunswick Township, Schuylkill County, Pennsylvania, United States. It was also called Rausch and is located along the east side of the Little Schuylkill River and on the north foot of Blue Mountain. It is served by the New Ringgold post office with the Zip Code of 17960.
