= Daniel Koch (politician) =

American politician

- Born: December 24, 1816; Kunkle's Mill, East Brunswick Township, Pennsylvania, U.S.
- Died: January 7, 1903 (aged 86)
- Occupations: Farmer, Politician
- Known for: member of the Pennsylvania House of Representatives
- Political party: Republican
- Children: 11, including Richard H. Koch
- Relatives: Roscoe R. Koch (grandson); Richard L. Yuengling Jr.

Daniel Koch (December 24, 1816 - January 7, 1903) was an American politician. A member of the Pennsylvania House of Representatives, he was elected in 1860. He was the father of railroad magnate Richard H. Koch and served as a Union soldier in the Civil War.

== Early life ==
Koch was born as the first of ten children to Henry Koch and Susanna Bock Koch on December 24, 1816. He was born at the mill that his ancestors built, called Kunkle's Mill. Susanna was the daughter of Balthaser Bock, an emigrant from Prussia. Koch was also ethnically Germanic; his ancestor Adam Koch arrived from Germany on May 30, 1741. Adam settled in Whitehall Township, Pennsylvania.

Daniel Koch's siblings were: Hugh, Henry, William and Charles (twins), Mary (who married Eli Miller), Catherine (who married William Shuman), Sarah (who married Charles T. Bowen of Pottsville), and Amanda (who married Jacob H. Pyle).

On October 24, 1839, Daniel married Miss Mary Ann Beck who was "from an old and prominent family in Pennsylvania." She was born on January 24, 1818, and died August 26, 1888. Together, Koch and Mary had eleven children, being: Harriet (who married B. F. Jacobs), Francis Daniel, Allen, Jeremiah, Albert B., Sarah Maria (who married Dr. Lentz of Fleetwood), Richard Henry, Emanuel, Arenius Glen, Catherine "Kate" Mary (who married Oscar B. Mellott), and Ambrose Ellsworth. All but Albert B. lived to maturity, who died at the age of six.

=== Business ===
After his marriage to Mary, the family moved to Middleport, Pennsylvania, where Koch joined in the mercantile business. In 1857, they moved again, and this time he began farming. Daniel's father Henry had been a successful farmer, merchant and miller. Daniel continued in that tradition and ended up owning the Koch Homestead, which comprised 143 acres. Of those, over 100 were cultivated.

In 1866, the family moved again, this time to Monocacy in Berks County. There, Koch purchased and managed a flour mill. He purchased a second mill in the town of Fleetwood, which he operated until his retirement in 1882.

== Politics ==
Koch was considered "an influential man in politics." He stumped the county with a number of influential men, including Anson Burlingame, Governor Andrew Gregg Curtin, George Francis Train, and others. He was nominated and elected to the Pennsylvania House of Representatives in 1860, as a Republican, where he was considered "a very popular public speaker and valued member of his party."

In 1863, when Pennsylvania was invaded by General Robert E. Lee of the Confederate States Army during the Civil War, Daniel and his third son Jeremiah served in protecting the state. Both joined Company E in the 27th Pennsylvania Infantry Regiment. Daniel's oldest son Francis served for three years in the Union Army against the Confederates as a company commander, gaining the rank of captain. Daniel's brothers Hugh, Henry, William and Charles also served in the Union army as well.
