= Gavin Bartholomew =

American football player (born 2003)

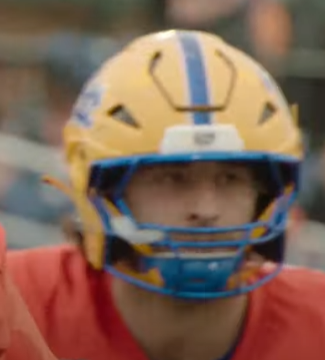
- Bartholomew at the 2025 Senior Bowl

No. 86 – Minnesota Vikings
- Position: Tight end
- Roster status: Active

Personal information
- Born: April 30, 2003 (age 23); Schuylkill Haven, Pennsylvania, U.S.
- Listed height: 6 ft 5 in (1.96 m)
- Listed weight: 249 lb (113 kg)

Career information
- High school: Blue Mountain (Schuylkill Haven, Pennsylvania)
- College: Pittsburgh (2021–2024)
- NFL draft: 2025: 6th round, 202nd overall pick

Career history
- Minnesota Vikings (2025–present)

Career NFL statistics as of Week 10, 2026
- Receptions: 10
- Receiving yards: 90
- Receiving touchdowns: 1
- Stats at Pro Football Reference

Gavin Bartholomew (born April 30, 2003) is an American professional football tight end for the Minnesota Vikings of the National Football League (NFL). He played college football for the Pittsburgh Panthers and was selected by the Vikings in the sixth round of the 2025 NFL draft.

== Early life ==
Bartholomew was born on April 30, 2003, and grew up in Schuylkill Haven, Pennsylvania. He started playing football in third grade and also competed in baseball growing up. He attended Blue Mountain High School where he competed in football, baseball and track and field. He started at quarterback at Blue Mountain, before moving to defensive end and tight end as a sophomore; he started at defensive end for his final three seasons and was a starter at tight end as a junior and senior. He caught 27 passes for 527 yards and five touchdowns as a junior and was named team captain as a senior, catching six passes for 131 yards and two touchdowns before returning to quarterback to conclude the season. A three-star recruit, he committed to play college football as a tight end for the Pittsburgh Panthers, after having flipped from the Buffalo Bulls.

== College career ==
As a true freshman with the Panthers in 2021, Bartholomew caught 28 passes for 326 yards and four touchdowns. He was named honorable mention All-Atlantic Coast Conference (ACC) and was chosen second-team Freshman All-American for his performance. He played in 13 games, 10 as a starter, in 2022, posting 21 catches for 283 yards and two touchdowns, and he then caught 18 passes for 326 yards and one touchdown in the 2023 season, during which he started all 10 games in which he appeared. As a senior in 2024, he served as a team captain and caught 38 passes for 322 yards and four touchdowns. He concluded his collegiate career having started 41 games and totaled 104 receptions for 1,248 yards and 11 touchdowns. He accepted an invite to the 2025 Senior Bowl.

== Professional career ==
Pre-draft measurables
Height	Weight	Arm length	Hand span	Wingspan	40-yard dash	10-yard split	20-yard split	20-yard shuttle	Three-cone drill	Vertical jump	Broad jump	Bench press
6 ft 4 5/8 in (1.95 m)	246 lb (112 kg)	31 3/8 in (0.80 m)	9 7/8 in (0.25 m)	6 ft 6 3/8 in (1.99 m)	4.70 s	1.59 s	2.76 s	4.30 s	7.00 s	36.5 in (0.93 m)	10 ft 2 in (3.10 m)	16 reps
All values from NFL Combine/Pro Day

Bartholomew was selected by the Minnesota Vikings in the sixth round (202nd overall) of the 2025 NFL draft. He did not make a regular-season appearances for Minnesota as the result of a back injury.

In week 10 of the 2026 NFL season against the Green Bay Packers, Bartholomew caught a 20-yard touchdown pass from Kirk Cousins in the third quarter, he made a stiff-arm over Packers safety Evan Williams to score his first NFL career touchdown. Bartholomew finished the game with three receptions for 39 yards in the 30–10 win.
