= Pottsville Area School District =

School district in Pennsylvania

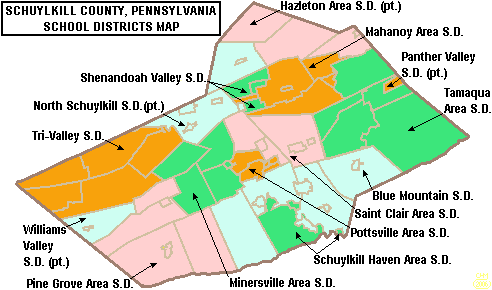
- Location of Pottsville Area School District in Schuylkill County, Pennsylvania

Address
- 1501 West Laurel Boulevard Pottsville, Schuylkill County, Pennsylvania, 17901; United States

Other information
- Website: www.pottsville.k12.pa.us

Pottsville Area School District is a midsized, rural/suburban public school district located in Pottsville, Pennsylvania, serving students in central Schuylkill County. It encompasses approximately 12 square miles (31 km^{2}). The district serves the City of Pottsville and five additional municipalities: the boroughs of Mechanicsville, Mount Carbon, Port Carbon, Palo Alto, and Norwegian Township.

== Demographics ==
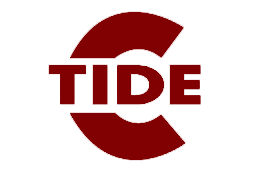
The Pottsville Area Crimson Tide logo, the district's mascot

According to 2000 census data, the school district served a resident population of 21,394. By 2010, the District's population declined to 20,095 people. The educational attainment levels for the School District population (25 years old and over) were 86.6% high school graduates and 14.3% college graduates. The district is one of the 500 public school districts of Pennsylvania. The district has a tuition-based agreement at the secondary level with the Saint Clair Area School District located in the borough of Saint Clair.

According to the Pennsylvania Budget and Policy Center, 53.5% of the District's pupils lived at 185% or below the federal poverty level as shown by their eligibility for the federal free or reduced price school meal programs in 2012. In 2013, the Pennsylvania Department of Education, reported that 13 students in the Pottsville Area School District were homeless. In 2009, the district residents’ per capita income was $17,955, while the median family income was $41,442. In Pennsylvania, the median family income was $49,501 and the United States median family income was $49,445, in 2010. In Schuylkill County, the median household income was $45,012.

By 2013, the median household income in the United States rose to $52,100, compared to a median U.S. household income of $53,700 in 2014.

== Schools ==
Pottsville Area School District operates three schools: Pottsville Area High School (grades 9–12), D.H.H. Lengel Middle School (grades 5–8), and John S. Clarke Elementary School (grades K–4).

High school students may choose to attend the Schuylkill Technology Centers for training in the construction and mechanical trades. The Schuylkill Intermediate Unit IU29 provides the District with a wide variety of services, including specialized education for disabled students, state mandated training on recognizing and reporting child abuse, speech and visual disability services, criminal background check processing for prospective employees, and professional development for staff and faculty.
