= New Ringgold Gristmill =

- U.S. National Register of Historic Places
- Mill in 2011

- Location within Pennsylvania Location within the United States
- Location: SR 53062, East Brunswick Township, Pennsylvania, U.S.
- Coordinates: 40°41′25″N 76°0′24″W
- Area: 0.3 acres (0.12 ha)
- Built: c. 1852
- NRHP reference No.: 78002464
- Added to NRHP: December 18, 1978

New Ringgold Gristmill is a historic grist mill located at East Brunswick Township in Schuylkill County, Pennsylvania. It was built about 1852, and is a small 2 1/2-story, rectangular building.

The mill is constructed of wood and native stone and has a medium gable roof.

It was added to the National Register of Historic Places in 1978.
