= Blue Mountain School District =

School district in Pennsylvania

Coordinates: 40.6552°N 76.0865°W

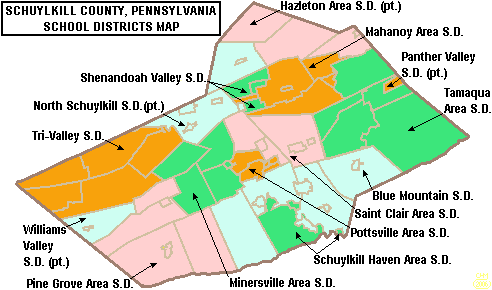
- Location of Blue Mountain School District in Schuylkill County, Pennsylvania

Address
- 685 Red Dale Road, P.O. Box 188 Orwigsburg, Schuylkill County, Pennsylvania, 17961-0188; United States

District information
- Type: Public
- Grades: K-12
- Schools: Four, including Blue Mountain High School
- Budget: $49.549 million
- NCES District ID: 4203870

Students and staff
- Students: 2,486 (2023-24)
- Teachers: 197.8 (on an FTE basis)
- Student–teacher ratio: 12.57
- District mascot: Eagles
- Colors: Blue and white

Other information
- Website: www.bmsd.org

The Blue Mountain School District is a midsized, rural public school district in Schuylkill County, Pennsylvania. The district is one of 500 public school districts of Pennsylvania. The district serves five boroughs, Auburn, Cressona, Deer Lake, New Ringgold, and Orwigsburg, and four townships, Wayne, East Brunswick, North Manheim, and West Brunswick.

== History ==
In 1954, six school districts, Cressona, Orwigsburg, New Ringgold, Wayne township, East Brunswick township, and North Manheim township joined together to create the "Blue Mountain School System". The purpose was for the "furnishing of the best possible educational opportunities for the children of these districts". Students in North Manheim township attended Schuylkill Haven High School, and continued to do so under the townships expense, while New Ringgold residents who were attending Tamaqua High School in Tamaqua would continue to do so until graduation.

From 1955-1957, all students attended Cressona High School, which was turned into an elementary school, and Orwigsburg residents attended Orwigsburg High School (which also became an elementary school, although it closed in the early 1980s and its respective students attended Elementary East instead) until Blue Mountain High School was built in 1957.

In 1966 the schools were becoming overcrowded, and the district moved forward with scheduling the establishment of a new middle school building through paying for it instead of waiting for money from the Pennsylvania state government.

== Demographics ==
Blue Mountain School District encompasses approximately 125 square miles (320 km^{2}). According to 2000 federal census data, Blue Mountain School District served a resident population of 19,436. By 2010, the district's population was 20,463 people, making it a District of the Third Class. The educational attainment levels for the Blue Mountain School District population (25 years old and over) were 88.6% high school graduates and 22.5% college graduates.

According to the Pennsylvania Budget and Policy Center, 24.1% of the district's pupils lived at 185% or below the Federal Poverty Level as shown by their eligibility for the federal free or reduced price school meal programs in 2012. In 2009, the Blue Mountain School District residents' per capita income was $21,212, and median family income was $36,276.

In Schuylkill County, the median household income was $45,012. In the Commonwealth, the median family income was $49,985 and the United States median family income was $49,445, in 2010.

By 2013, the median household income in the United States rose to $52,100. In 2014, the median household income in the USA was $53,700.

== Schools ==
Blue Mountain School District operates five schools: Blue Mountain High School, Blue Mountain Middle School, Blue Mountain Elementary East, Blue Mountain Elementary West, and Blue Mountain Virtual Academy, founded in 2016. School colors are blue and white. Blue Mountain High school students may choose to attend either of the Schuylkill Technology Centers for training in construction and mechanical trades as well as various other careers.

The Schuylkill Intermediate Unit, IU29, provides the district with a wide variety of services, including specialized education for disabled students and hearing, speech and visual disability services, mandated training on recognizing and reporting child abuse, background checks for prospective employees, and professional development for staff and faculty.

In 2022, the district closed Blue Mountain Elementary Cressona after opening its remodeled Elementary West school.

== Controversies ==
=== Rocks in defense of school intruder ===
In 2018, Superintendent Dr. David Helsel spoke at a school board meeting in which he said that students were given river stone rocks in the case of a school shooter. He also said that the district follows the ALICE training program.

=== Varsity head coach steps down ===
In January 2025, Tom Gallagher, the varsity football head coach, stepped down. His reasons for doing so were “...I can’t look over my shoulder leading a program and I can’t wonder what things are going to be coming next. That has started to happen here. That’s something that I don’t want to be involved in and that’s ultimately what led to this decision.”. His decision to step down has caused controversy for the district, as nepotism has been called into question, with a school board director having a son on the team.

== Athletics ==
Blue Mountain School District offers a variety of activities and interscholastic sports, including:

=== Boys ===
- Baseball – AAAAA
- Basketball- AAA
- Cross Country – AA
- Football – AAA
- Golf – AAA
- Soccer – AA
- Swimming and Diving – AA
- Tennis – AA
- Track and field – AAA
- Wrestling – AAA

=== Girls ===
- Basketball – AAAAA
- Cheer – AAAA
- Cross Country – AA
- Soccer (Fall) – AA
- Softball – AAA
- Swimming and Diving – AA
- Girls' Tennis – AA
- Track and Field – AAA
- Volleyball – AA

=== Middle school sports ===
==== Boys ====
- Basketball
- Cross Country
- Soccer
- Track and Field
- Wrestling (Co-Ed)
- Football
- Baseball

==== Girls ====
- Basketball
- Cross Country
- Softball
- Track and Field

According to the July 2013 PIAA directory
