= Knights of the Golden Eagle =

American fraternal organization

- KGE
- Founded: 1872; 154 years ago Baltimore, Maryland, US
- Type: Fraternal order
- Affiliation: Independent
- Status: Defunct
- Scope: National
- Members: 74,000+ lifetime
- Headquarters: North Wales, Pennsylvania; United States

The Knights of the Golden Eagle (KGE) was an American fraternal organization founded in Baltimore, Maryland, in 1872. At its height in the 1920s, the organization had 73,340 members in 26 states. It ceased operations in the late 1960s or early 1970s.

== History ==
Knights of the Golden Eagle was established in Baltimore, Maryland, in 1872. The order's original objectives were to help its members find employment and aid them while unemployed. Membership was open to males over 18, who were able to write and support themselves, were law-abiding, of sound moral character, and the Christian faith. Its core purpose was to help members find employment, provide aid to the unemployed, and offer support to widows and orphans. There was a female auxiliary called the Ladies of the Golden Eagle.

In the early years of its existence, the group received assistance from other secret societies and fraternal groups. The Odd Fellows helped them become established in Philadelphia in 1875 and the Knights of Pythias helped them become established in Massachusetts in 1880.

== Organization ==
Local lodges were called "Castles", statewide structures were called "Grand Castles", and the overall group "Supreme Castle". In the early 1920s, the Knights were headquartered at 814−816 North Broad Street, Philadelphia. The last known headquarters of the group was in North Wales, Pennsylvania.

== Membership ==
Membership was open to men over 18 who were of good moral character, sound mental and physical health, able to write and support themselves, and were law-abiding citizens. By the early 1920s, the group had 73,340 members in 26 states. Membership began to decline in the 1930s. In 1965, the group had 15,000 members, mostly concentrated in Pennsylvania. In the late 1970s, scholar Alvin J. Schmidt was unable to locate a current address for the group and determined that it was extinct.

Female Auxiliary: A female auxiliary, the Ladies of the Golden Eagle, existed, though it's unclear if it still functions.

== Ritual ==
The Knights' ritual worked three degrees, based on the history of the Crusades: the first degree accented the pilgrim and taught the candidate fidelity to God and man; the second degree used the medieval knight as its role model to teach the member to revere religion, fidelity, valor, charity, courtesy and hospitality; the third degree was based on the figure of the crusader and it "equipped the member against the evil of his enemies." Members of the Ladies of the Golden Eagle took one degree, the Temple Degree, upon being initiated. Oaths were sworn on an open Bible.

== Eagle Home Association ==
This was the mutual benefit arm of the Knights, whose object was to protect aged members of the order, as well as their orphans and widows. It was supported by a per capita tax on such Castles as were enrolled in it. (Note: Preuss was unable to get in touch with this group in the early 1920s.)

== Notable members ==
- Leon Czolgosz, anarchist who assassinated United States President William McKinley
- Richard H. Koch, judge and railroad magnate
- John Buchanan Robinson, U.S. House of Representatives, Pennsylvania House of Representatives, and Pennsylvania State Senate

== See also ==
- List of general fraternities
- Benefit society
