= Blue Mountain High School =

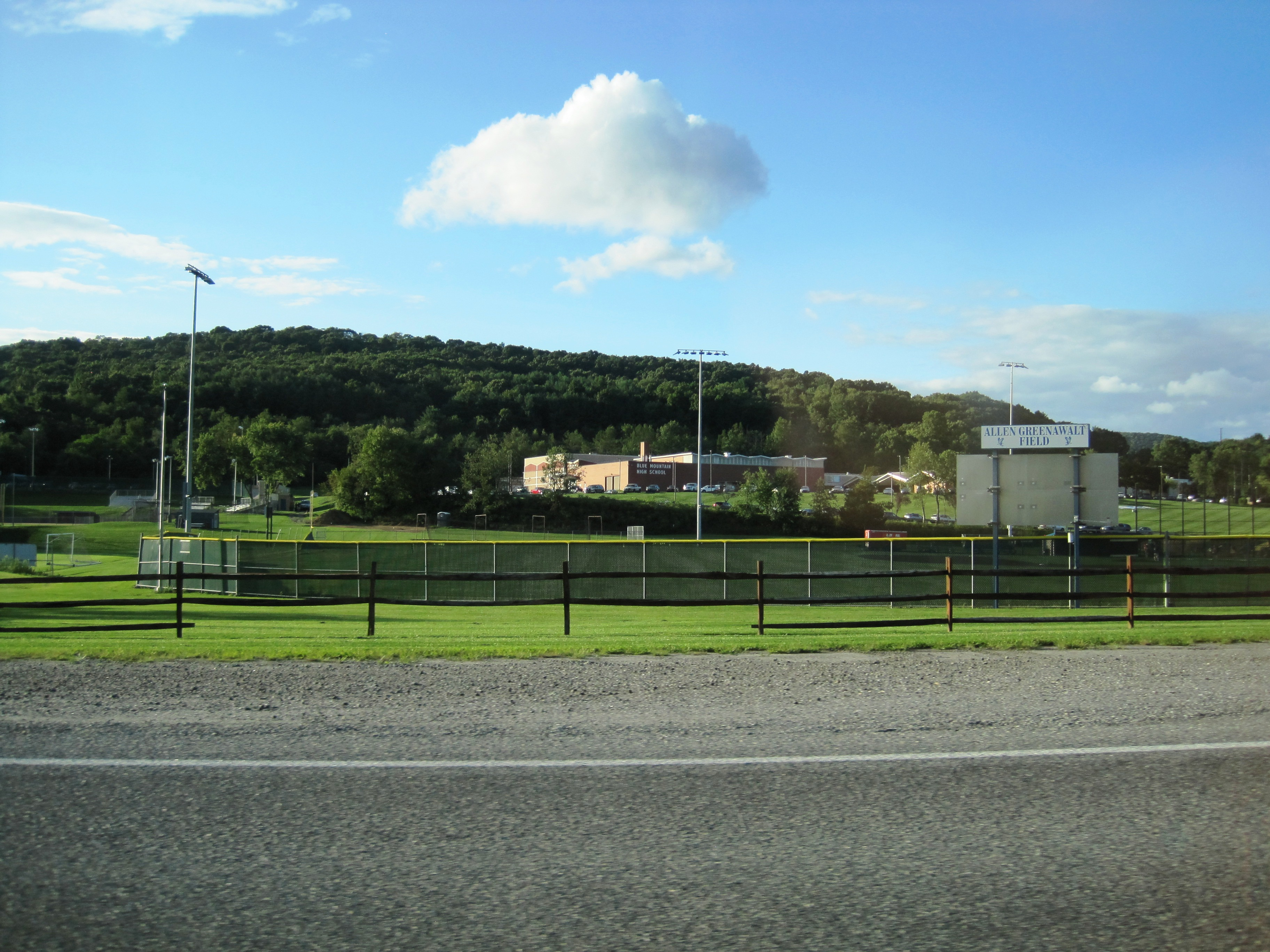
- Photo of school from PA 443

Location
- 1076 W Market Street; Orwigsburg, Schuylkill County, Pennsylvania 17972-9801; United States; 40.647610°N 76.135510°W

Information
- Type: Public high school
- School district: Blue Mountain School District
- NCES School ID: 420387003891
- Principal: Eric Schaeffer
- Faculty: 70.8 (on an FTE basis)
- Grades: 9–12
- Enrollment: 815 (2023–24)
- Student to teacher ratio: 11.51
- Colors: Navy and white
- Nickname: Eagles
- Website: www.bmsd.org/high-school

Blue Mountain High School is a rural public high school in Orwigsburg, Pennsylvania. The school, which was built in 1957, was renovated from 1999 to 2001. It is part of the Blue Mountain School District. As of the 2023–24 school year, there were 815 students enrolled in the school and 70.8 teachers on an FTE basis for a student-teacher ratio of 11.51, according to National Center for Education Statistics data.

An original Wanamaker Eagle was donated to the school when the department store it had decorated for many years went out of business. The bronze Eagle stands in front of the school.

High school students may choose to attend the Schuylkill Technology Center for training in the construction and mechanical trades. The Schuylkill Intermediate Unit IU29 provides the school with a wide variety of services like: specialized education for disabled students; state mandated training on recognizing and reporting child abuse; speech and visual disability services; criminal background check processing for prospective employees and professional development for staff and faculty. In 2016–17, Blue Mountain School District began to offer a virtual academy for its pupils.

== Extracurriculars ==
Blue Mountain School District offers a variety of clubs, activities and an extensive sports program.

Clubs

=== Art Club ===
This club is for people to make and enjoy art. The art club has several yearly contests such as the ornament contest and the Jambandoree poster contest. The Art Club also hosts the annual Jambandoree and Art Show. Profits from the Jambandoree benefit the Art Club.

=== Improv Club ===
A new addition to Blue Mountain High School, the Improv Club meets bi-weekly. the Improv Club's goal is to show students that acting can be both fun and educational.

=== Yearbook ===
The yearbook staff designs and publishes the annual Blue Mountain Eagle Echo. The yearbook staff takes pictures, forms layouts, hosts club and activity picture day, and distributes yearbooks to the school.

=== Newspaper ===
The BMHS newspaper is called the Aerie and communicates information on school and world events.

=== Music Program ===
The band program encompasses a variety of ensembles.

==== Marching band ====
The Marching Band performs at football games and competes in various events throughout the season. The Marching Band has an auxiliary unit called the Guard, which is a flag corps. The marching band has competed in several major events. These include Tournament of Bands Championships at Lackawanna County Stadium, Cadets Marching Band Cooperative (now USBands) at Giants/Jets Stadium, Cavalcade of Bands, Walt Disney World Parade, Azalea Festival Parade (Richmond, Virginia), and others.

==== Symphonic Band ====
The Symphonic Band performs at spring concerts, adjudications, and school and community events throughout the spring semester. This ensemble studies and plays pieces spanning five centuries of musical genres.

==== Jazz Band ====
The Jazz Ensemble performs concerts each year. This ensemble features extra instrumentation in the rhythm section and allows selected band members to experience the jazz genre of music.

==== Indoor Drumline ====
In December of each year, the Indoor Drumline begins its intensive rehearsals for its competition season, during which it performs in weekly competitions beginning in March. The ensemble consists of snare drums, a series of pitched bass drums, quints, cymbals, and various pit instruments, including marimba, xylophone, vibraphone, timpani and other auxiliary instruments.

In 2006 and 2017, Blue Mountain's indoor drumline won the Atlantic Cost Championship in Wildwood, NJ.

==== Indoor Color Guard ====
As an extension of the outdoor marching band color guard the indoor guard was formed in the fall of 2001 to better serve the needs of the program year-round. The color guard performs several times throughout the winter and spring months ending with championships in late April or early May. The group can consist of as many as 30 members or as few as 5. BMHS guard typically averages around 9–12 members. Each year, staff selects recorded music to which the color guard will perform. Equipment consists of flags, rifles, and sabers. The guard typically incorporates dance into the shows to add a layer of difficulty and design.

In 2008, the guard won the Chapter Championships. A week later, they qualified for the All-Chapter Championships and finished 8th.

== Athletics ==
Blue Mountain offers a variety of District XI sports. Blue Mountain consists of football, boys' and girls' cross country, golf, girls' tennis, and girls' volleyball in the fall, boys' and girls' basketball, wrestling, and swimming and diving in the winter, and baseball, softball, track and field, girls' soccer and boys' tennis in the spring. In most sports, it is a AAA school, although swimming and soccer are AA.

=== Baseball ===
Blue Mountain's baseball team is the most successful sports team in the history of the school. Having one losing season in program history, they have won District titles in 2008, 2009, 2011, 2012, and 2018. They have also had second-place finishes in 2007, 2014, and 2015. The team is coached by Jarrod Kramer.

=== Boys' and girls' swimming and diving ===
The Blue Mountain Girls' Varsity Swim Team won the District XI AA Title in 2007 for the second year in a row. The Girls' team also won the Schuylkill League Championships in 2007, 2013, 2015, 2016,2017, 2018, 2019, 2020, 2021, and 2022. The boys' team has won the Schuylkill League Title in 2013, 2014, 2016, 2017, 2019, and 2020. They won the District XI AA Title in 2019 and 2020. Both teams have sent swimmers to the PIAA state meet. They are currently coached by Pete Sarnes and assistant coach Rebecca Donahue.

=== Boys' basketball ===
The Blue Mountain Boys' Basketball team won the District XI Championship in 1996, 2003, 2007, and 2023. The Eagles have won the Schuylkill League Championship, most recently in 2023. The team's head coach is Dustin Werdt.

=== Boys' soccer ===
The Blue Mountain boys' soccer team was one of the first schools in the county to embrace soccer as a varsity sport thanks to the efforts of ex-Blue Mountain chemistry teacher and former head coach Rob Burcik. The team has won multiple Schuylkill League championships since its founding, most recently in 2020, 2021, & 2022 by the varsity squad. The team is currently coached by Chris Brauer.

=== Cross Country ===
The Cross Country team started in 1968 as a club under the direction of Mr. Ralph Jeager, who would coach until 1987. Mr. Jordan Sullivan and Mr. Ed Taylor coached for several years each. In 1999, Mr. Cory Cantwell became head coach, assisted by Tyler Maley. From 1971 to 1984, the team met phenomenal success, winning League titles each year and District titles in twelve of the fourteen years. From 2001 to 2007 the cross country team has met phenomenal success because of coach Jared Buckman who took over the team. The girls' cross country team won leagues three years in a row from 2005 to 2007 while placing third in the 2004 season. The boys' team also succeeded by finishing in the top teams in the league meets for the past couple years. The current head coach is Justin O'Brien.

=== Football ===
The Blue Mountain football team was started in 1957 when the school was completed. The team's main rivals are Schuylkill Haven High School, known as the "Backyard Brawl", and Pottsville Area High School, known as the "Clash of 61". Chuck Kutz is the current head coach.

=== Girls' basketball ===
Blue Mountain's girls' basketball team has had a strong record and made it to the league playoffs and district championships many times.

=== Girls' softball ===
The Blue Mountain Varsity softball team won the Schuylkill League Championship in 2006. In 2023, they won the 4A Pennsylvania State Championship. The current head coach is Mike Rollman.

=== Girls' volleyball ===
The Blue Mountain girls' volleyball team is a growing sport at the school. In 2008, the team won the Division I league and played in the league semi-finals. In 2009, the team was Schuylkill League runner-ups, losing in the finals to Nativity BVM High School (Pottsville, PA).

=== Golf ===
The Blue Mountain golf team won the Schuylkill League fourteen straight years, from 1999 through 2012. It is one of the school's best teams. The head coach is Dr. Richard Eckert.

=== Varsity club ===
The BMHS Varsity Club is a club for athletes with at least one varsity letter. It is dedicated to fulfilling service projects to the school and community.

=== Wrestling ===
The Blue Mountain wrestling team placed in the top four in the 2007-2008 District 11 duals and qualified for two consecutive years. In 2007–08, they qualified seven wrestlers to the Northeast regional finals, a new school record, and had two state finalists one taking first and one taking second. In the 08–09 season, the team placed 6th at the Iron Man and qualified for the state duals for the first time, but fell in the state semifinals. They then had eight qualify for Northeast Regionals. The team then qualified six wrestlers for the state competition. The Eagles had five state winners then and were the state runner-up, giving Blue Mountain its first-ever state wrestling trophy. The Eagles wrestling team has nine 100 wins. They are coached by Head Coach Todd Kindig, assistant coach Harry Myers, and Gary Keener.

== Notable alumni ==
- Gavin Bartholomew, professional football player, Minnesota Vikings
- John E. Jones III, former federal judge
- Lance Rautzhan, former professional baseball player, Los Angeles Dodgers and Milwaukee Brewers
- Matt Stankiewitch, former professional football player, Jacksonville Jaguars
