= Little Schuylkill River =

River in Pennsylvania, United States

Coordinates: 40°34′44″N 76°01′35″W

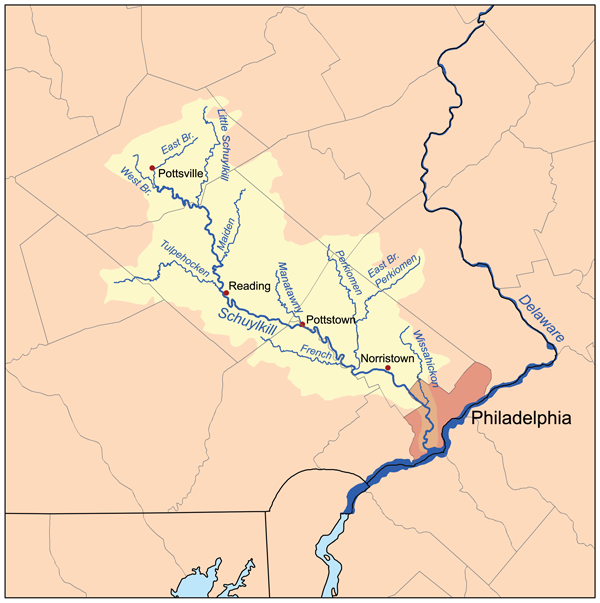
The Little Schuylkill River joins the Schuylkill River southeast of Pottsville, Pennsylvania,

The Little Schuylkill River is a 30.6-mile-long (49.2 km) tributary of the Schuylkill River in Northeastern Pennsylvania.

It rises south of McAdoo Heights near Haddock, Kline Township in Schuylkill County, Pennsylvania, on top of Broad Mountain. It flows south, then southwest passing through the communities of Tamaqua and New Ringgold. The river joins the Schuylkill River near Port Clinton west of Hawk Mountain. The Pennsylvania Fish and Boat Commission has designated several parts of the stream special trout stocking areas.

== History ==
The Little Schuylkill River was known as the Tamauguay Creek or River in the 18th and early to mid-19th centuries. Its name is derived from the Lenape word for "beaver" (tëmakwe or tamaqua) and also the Lenape method for using "hunter’s hints," which identified it as the "place of the beavers".

When European settlers arrived in the region, the Little Schuylkill River, a tributary of the Schuylkill River, came to be known as Little Schuylkill River with the name Schuylkill coming from the Dutch language word that translates as "hidden river".

== Tributaries ==
- Indian Run
- Rattling Run
- Lofty Creek
- Locust Creek
- Panther Creek
- Wabash Creek
- Owl Creek
- Cold Run
- Koenigs Creek
- Brushy Run
- Swamp Run
- Rabbit Run
- Still Creek
- Pine Creek

== See also ==
- List of Pennsylvania rivers
