= Middleport, Pennsylvania =

Borough in Pennsylvania, US

- Borough
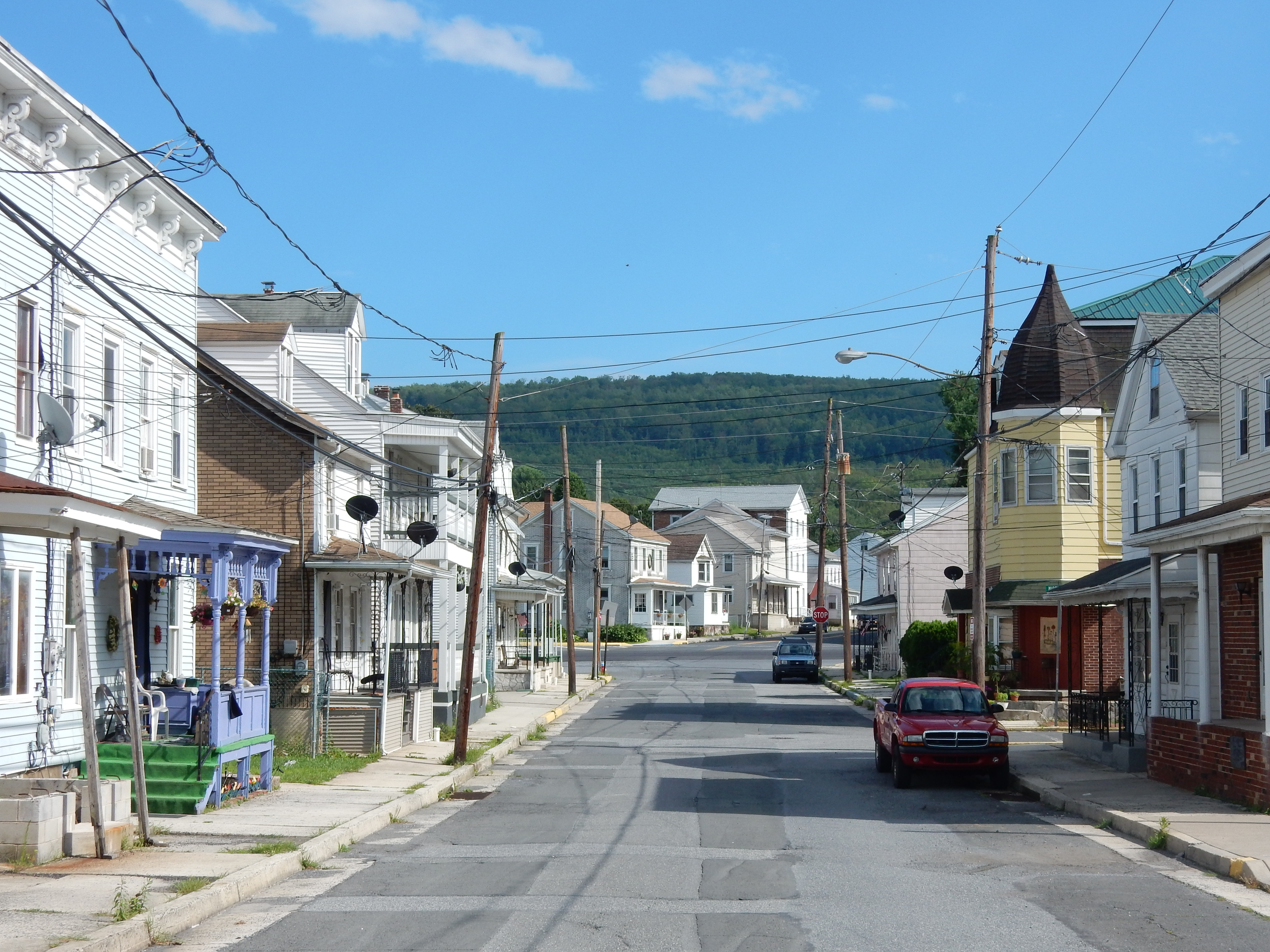
- Main Street in Middleport.

- Location of Middleport in Schuylkill County, Pennsylvania.

- Location in Pennsylvania Middleport (the United States)
- Coordinates: 40°43′49″N 76°05′08″W
- Country: United States
- State: Pennsylvania
- County: Schuylkill
- Settled: 1829
- Incorporated: 1859

Government
  - Type: Borough Council

Area
  - Total: 0.44 sq mi (1.14 km^{2})
  - Land: 0.44 sq mi (1.14 km^{2})
  - Water: 0 sq mi (0.00 km^{2})

Population (2020)
  - Total: 362
  - Density: 824.5/sq mi (318.34/km^{2})
- Time zone: UTC-5 (Eastern (EST))
  - Summer (DST): UTC-4 (EDT)
- ZIP code: 17953
- Area code: 570
- FIPS code: 42-49048

Middleport is a borough in Schuylkill County, Pennsylvania, United States. The population was 363 at the time of the 2020 census.

The town was named for being the mid-point of the sixteen-mile distance between Pottsville and Tamaqua.

== Geography ==
Middleport is located at 40°43′39″N 76°5′8″W (40.727464, -76.085565).

According to the United States Census Bureau, the borough has a total area of 0.4 square miles (1.0 km^{2}), all of it land.

== Demographics ==
Historical population
Census	Pop.	Note	%±
1860	421		—
1870	377		−10.5%
1880	230		−39.0%
1890	381		65.7%
1900	540		41.7%
1910	1,100		103.7%
1920	984		−10.5%
1930	1,225		24.5%
1940	1,077		−12.1%
1950	942		−12.5%
1960	775		−17.7%
1970	609		−21.4%
1980	577		−5.3%
1990	520		−9.9%
2000	458		−11.9%
2010	405		−11.6%
2020	362		−10.6%
2021 (est.)	363	▲	0.3%

As of the census of 2000, there were 458 people, 196 households, and 121 families living in the borough.

The population density was 1,065.4 inhabitants per square mile (411.4/km^{2}). There were 245 housing units at an average density of 569.9 per square mile (220.0/km^{2}).

The racial makeup of the borough was 99.56% White, 0.22% Native American, 0.22% from other races. Hispanic or Latino of any race were 0.22% of the population.

Of the 196 households 25.0% had children under the age of eighteen living with them, 47.4% were married couples living together, 10.7% had a female householder with no husband present, and 37.8% were non-families. 34.2% of households were one person and 20.9% were one person aged sixty-five or older.

The average household size was 2.34 and the average family size was 3.04.

The age distribution was 22.1% under the age of eighteen, 6.3% from eighteen to twenty-four, 28.2% from twenty-five to forty-four, 20.1% from forty-five to sixty-four, and 23.4% who were sixty-five or older. The median age was forty years.

For every one hundred females there were 94.9 males. For every one hundred females who were aged eighteen and over, there were 93.0 males.

The median household income was $30,114 and the median family income was $34,688. Males had a median income of $30,333 compared with that of $18,750 for females.

The per capita income for the borough was $13,931.

Roughly 10.3% of families and 9.5% of the population were living below the poverty line, including 12.4% of those who were under the age of eighteen and 12.2% of those who were aged sixty-five or over.

== Gallery ==
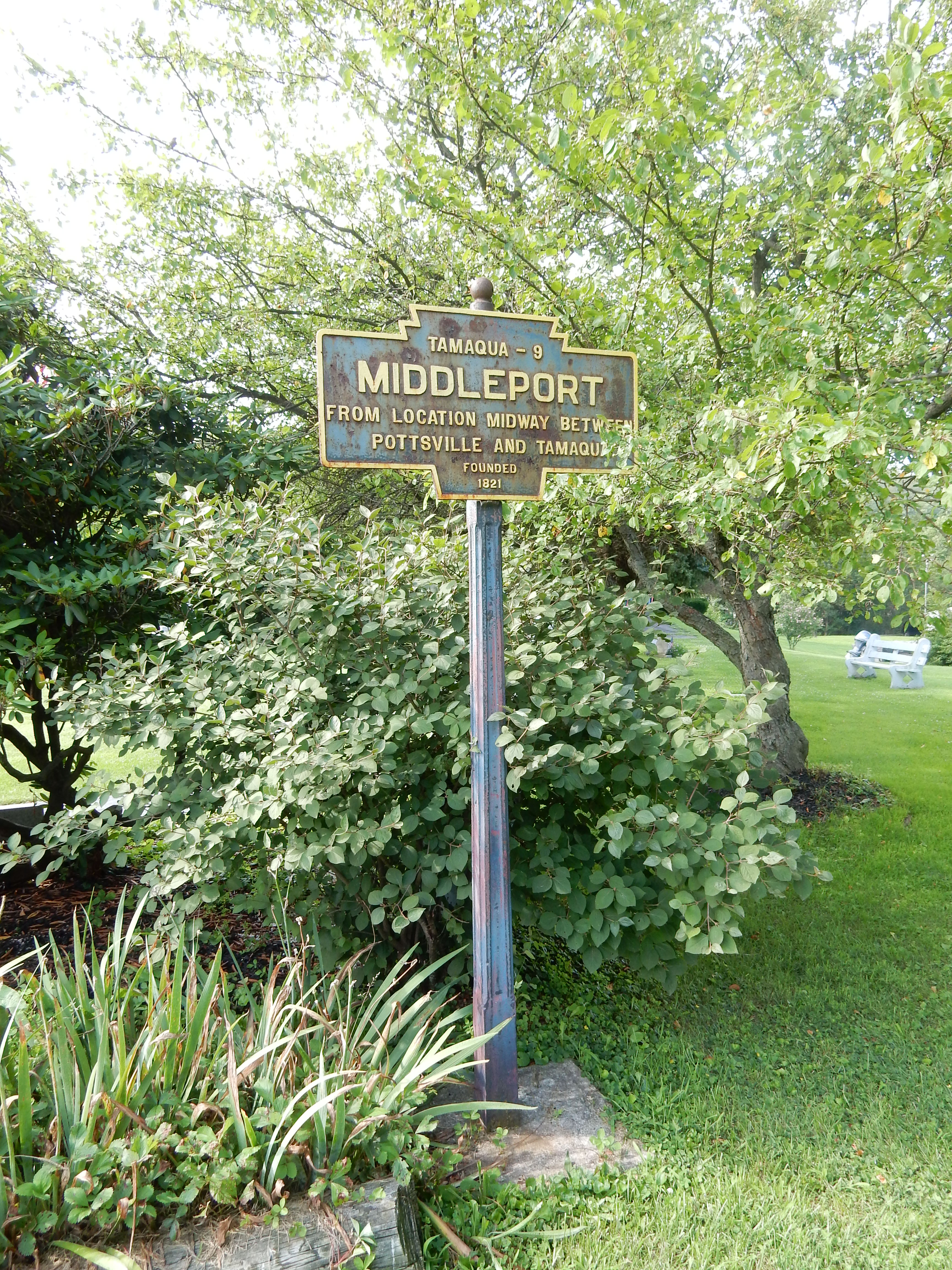
Borough sign

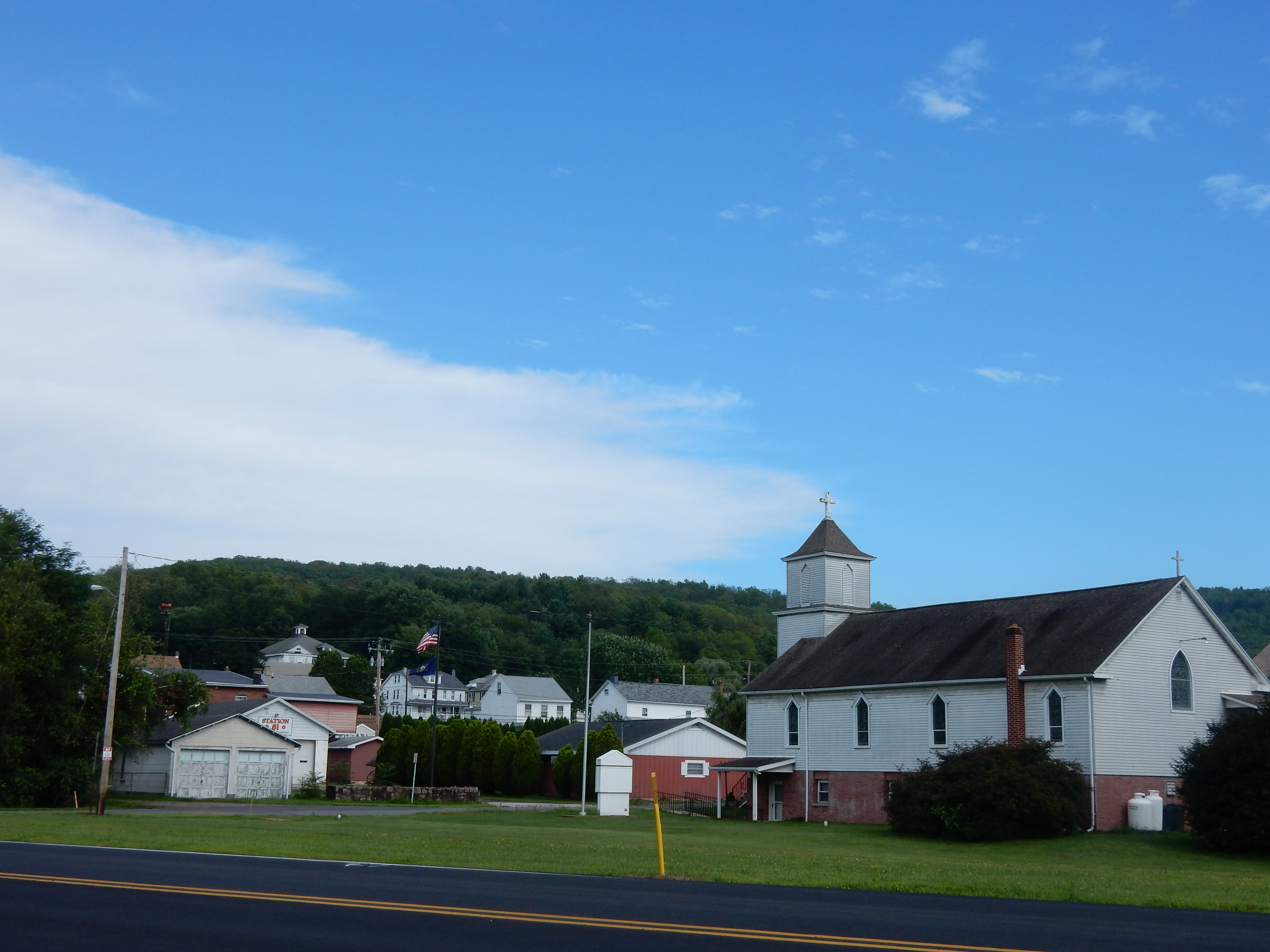
Union Street (U.S. Route 209)

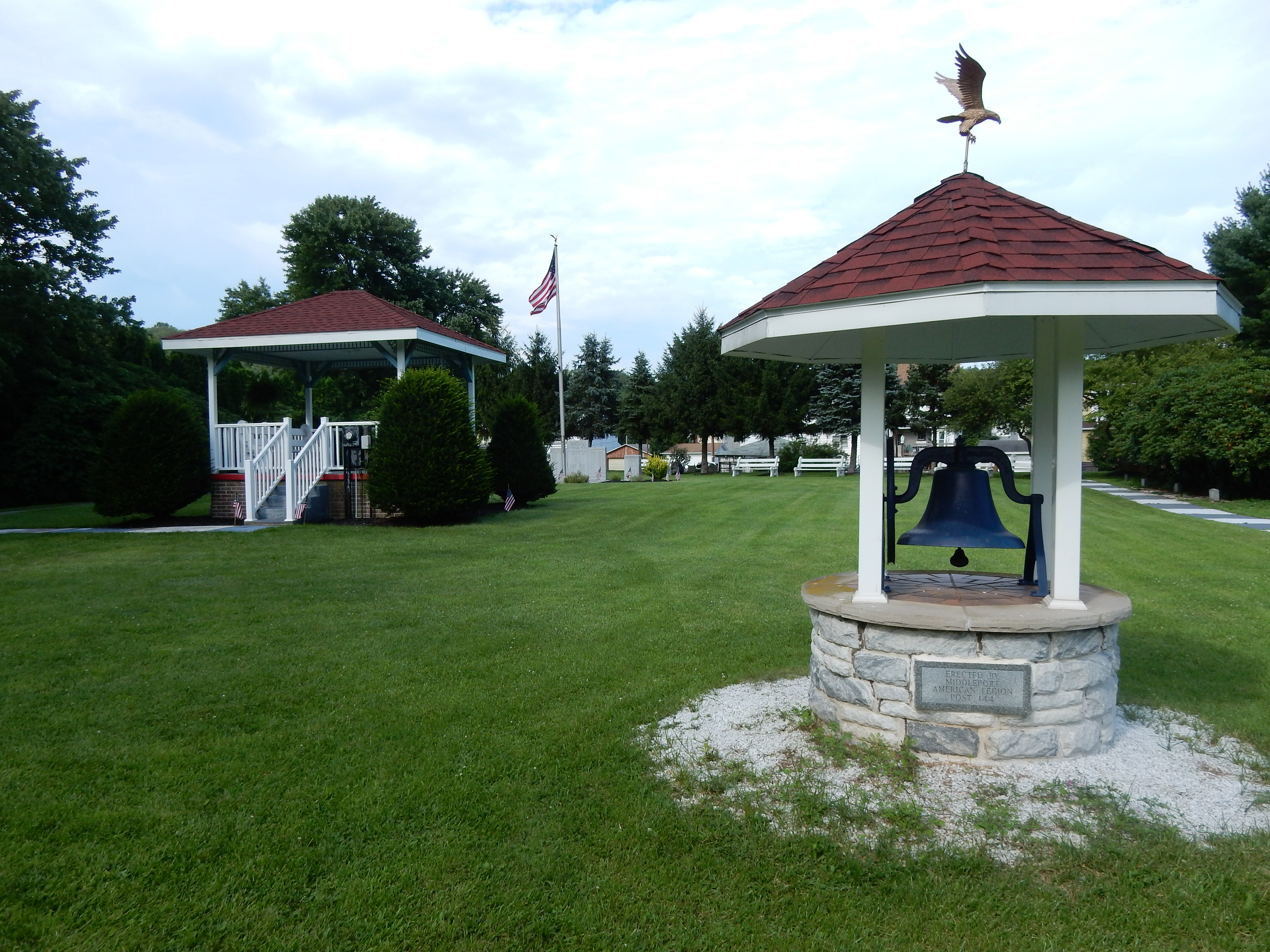
War Memorial Park

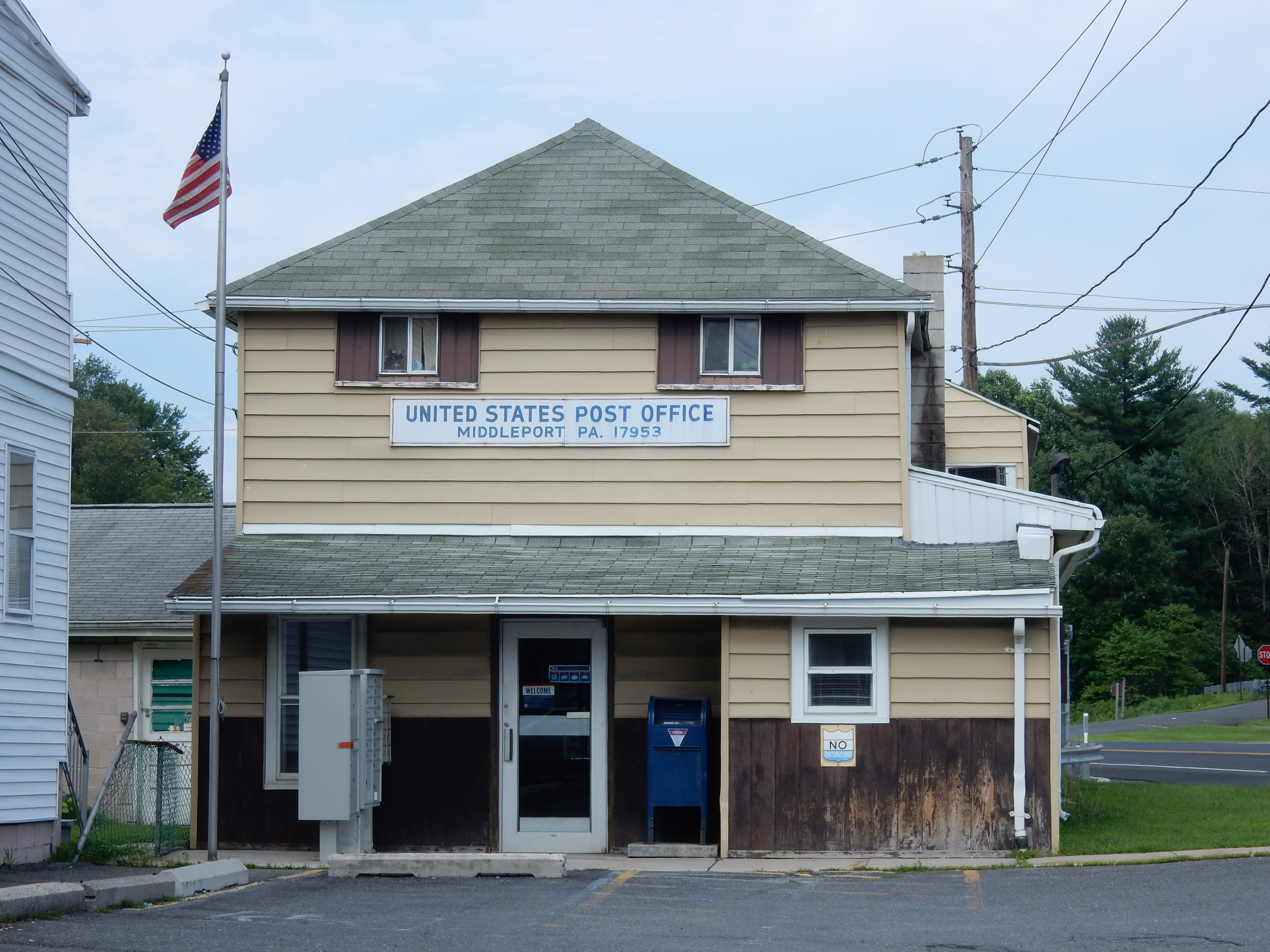
U.S. Post Office

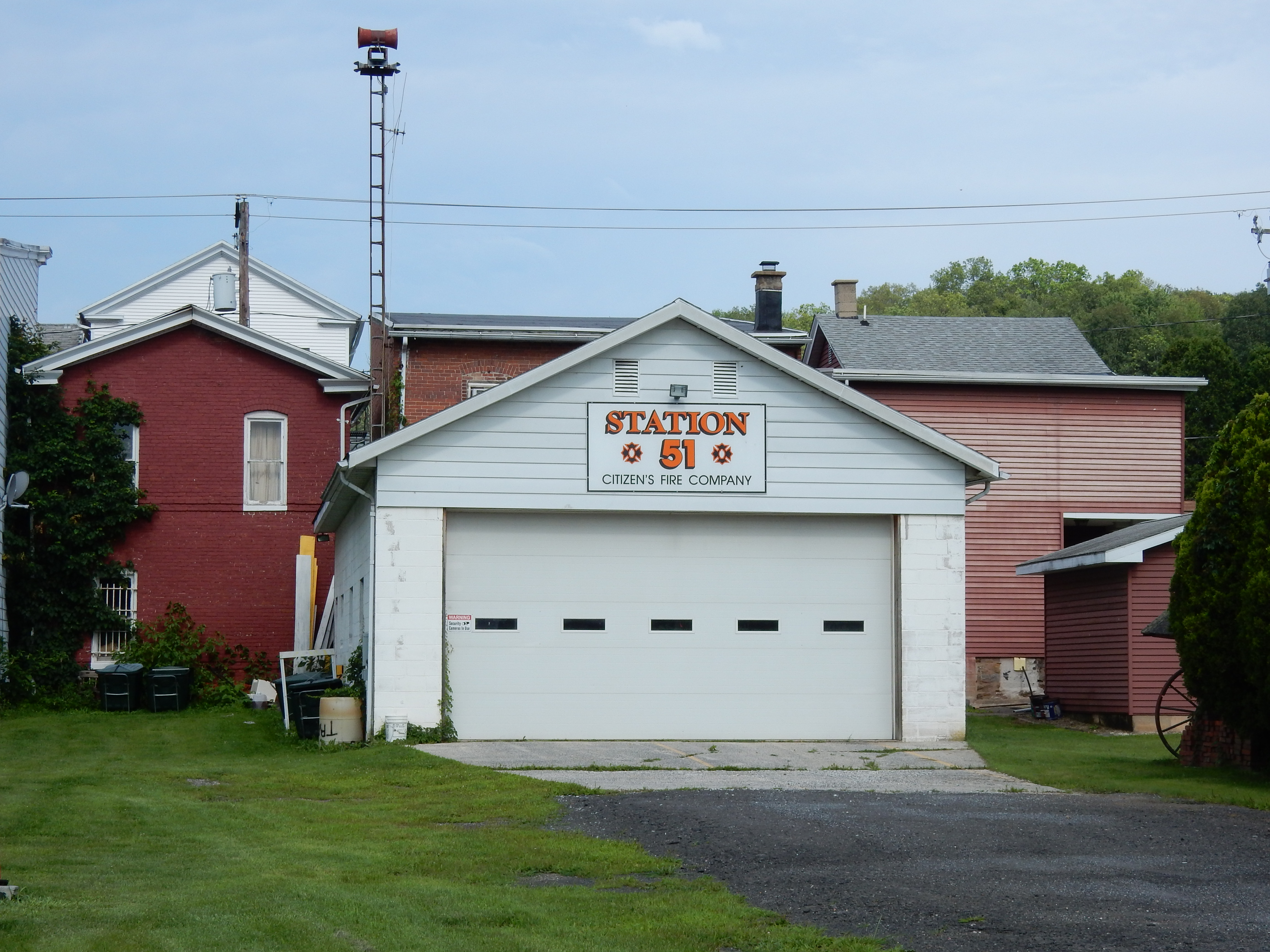
Station 51, Citizen's Fire Company

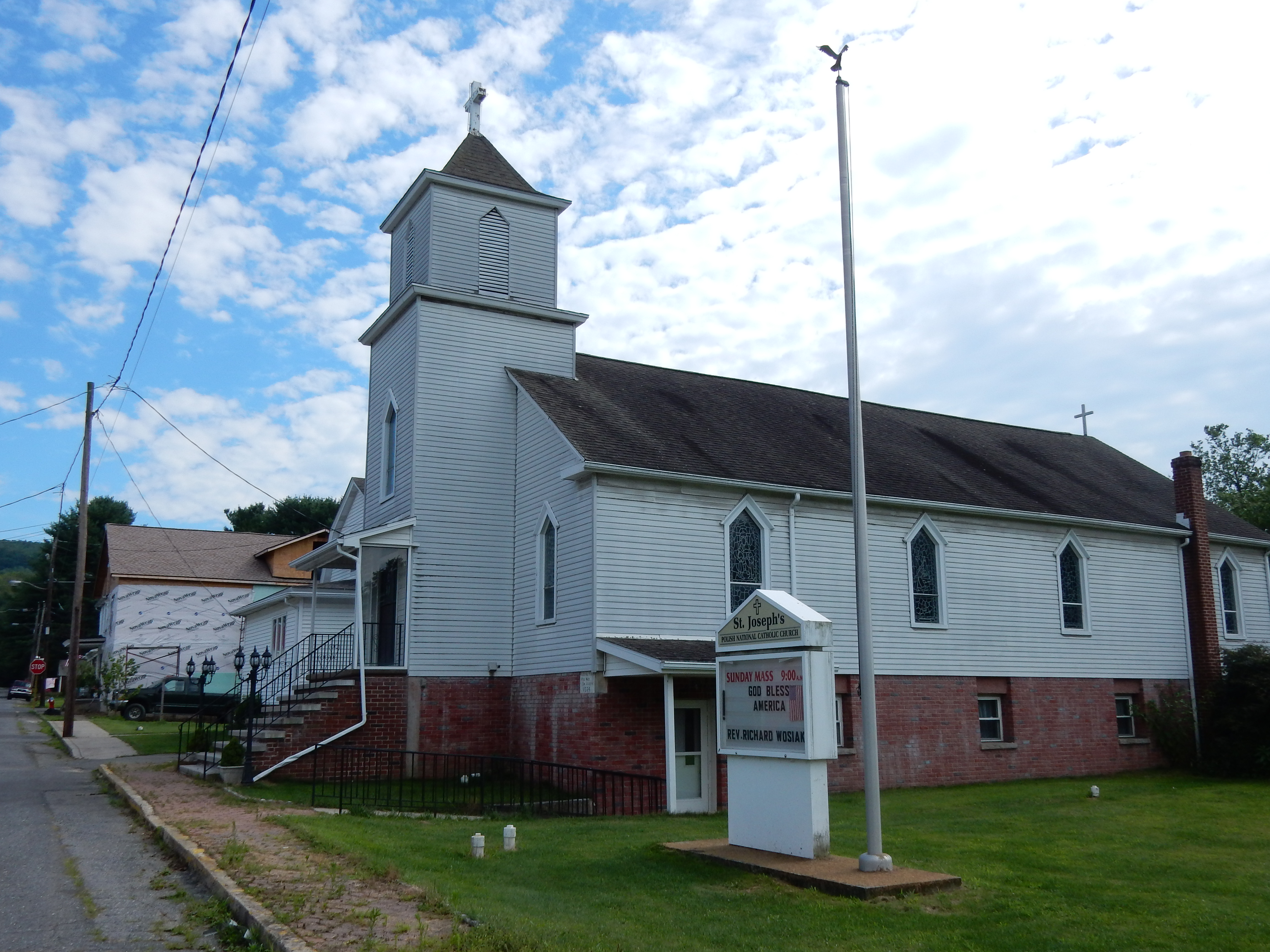
St. Joseph's Polish National Catholic Church
