= West Brunswick Township, Pennsylvania =

Township in Pennsylvania, US

Coordinates: 40°38′02″N 76°03′45″W

- Township
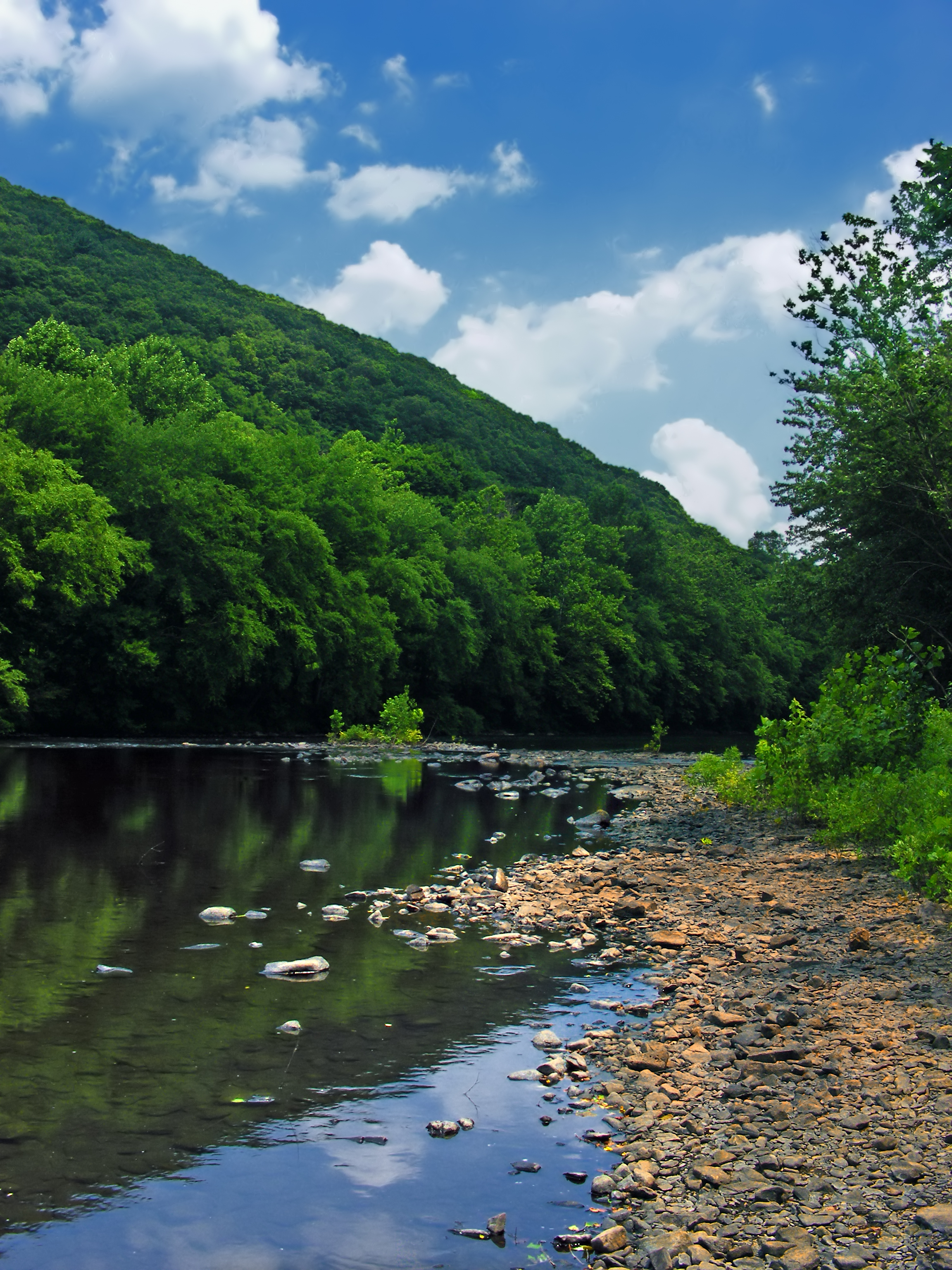
- The Schuylkill River in West Brunswick Township

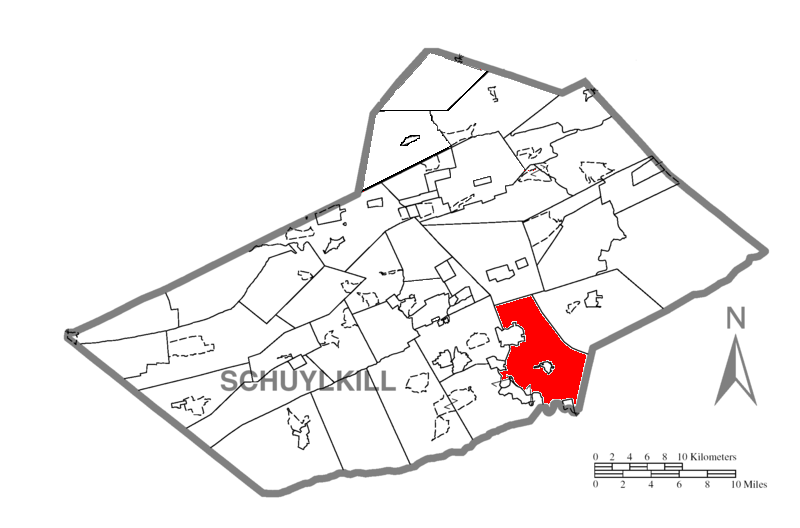
- Location of West Brunswick Township in Schuylkill County, Pennsylvania

- Location of Schuylkill County, Pennsylvania in Pennsylvania
- Country: United States
- State: Pennsylvania
- County: Schuylkill
- Settled: 1801
- Incorporated: 1835

Area
  - Total: 30.59 sq mi (79.22 km^{2})
  - Land: 30.43 sq mi (78.82 km^{2})
  - Water: 0.15 sq mi (0.40 km^{2})

Population (2020)
  - Total: 3,282 ▼
  - Estimate (2021): 3,285
  - Density: 107.0/sq mi (41.32/km^{2})
- Time zone: UTC-5 (Eastern (EST))
  - Summer (DST): UTC-4 (EDT)
- Area code: 570
- FIPS code: 42-107-82632

West Brunswick Township is a township located in Schuylkill County, Pennsylvania, United States.

== History ==
This township was formed in 1801 as one of the original townships of Schuylkill County, being named for Brunswick (Braunschweig), Germany. In 1835, Brunswick Township was divided into East and West Brunswick Townships.

The village names in the township include Molino, Pinedale and Frisbie.

== Geography ==
According to the U.S. Census Bureau, the township has a total area of 30.5 square miles (79.1 km^{2}), of which 30.3 square miles (78.6 km^{2}) is land and 0.2 square mile (0.5 km^{2}; 0.66%) is water.

== Demographics ==
Historical population
Census	Pop.	Note	%±
2010	3,327		—
2020	3,282		−1.4%
2021 (est.)	3,285		0.1%
U.S. Decennial Census

As of the census of 2000, there were 3,428 people, 1,323 households, and 998 families living in the township.

The population density was 113.0 inhabitants per square mile (43.6/km^{2}). There were 1,402 housing units at an average density of 46.2 per square mile (17.8/km^{2}).

The racial makeup of the township was 96.65% White, 0.23% African American, 0.06% Native American, 2.22% Asian, 0.12% from other races, and 0.73% from two or more races. Hispanic or Latino people of any race were 0.26% of the population.

There were 1,323 households, out of which 31.2% had children who were under the age of eighteen living with them, 67.2% were married couples living together, 5.4% had a female householder with no husband present, and 24.5% were non-families. Out of all of the households that were documented, 21.4% were made up of individuals, and 7.7% had someone living alone who was sixty-five years of age or older.

The average household size was 2.54 and the average family size was 2.96.

Within the township, the population was spread out, with 22.3% of residents who were under the age of 18, 6.4% from 18 to 24, 26.9% from 25 to 44, 28.7% from 45 to 64, and 15.7% who were 65 years of age or older. The median age was 42 years.

For every one hundred females, there were 99.5 males. For every one hundred females who were aged eighteen or older, there were 95.5 males.

The median income for a household in the township was $47,091, and the median income for a family was $51,292. Males had a median income of $39,886 compared with that of $22,398 for females.

The per capita income for the township was $27,436.

Approximately 4.7% of families and 5.4% of the population were living below the poverty line, including 2.8% of those who were under the age of eighteen and 9.9% of those who were aged sixty-five or older.

== Recreation ==
Portions of the Pennsylvania State Game Lands Number 106 and Number 110, which carry the Appalachian National Scenic Trail, are located along the southern border of the township.
