= East Brunswick Township, Pennsylvania =

Township in Pennsylvania, US

Coordinates: 40°40′48″N 75°56′59″W

- Township
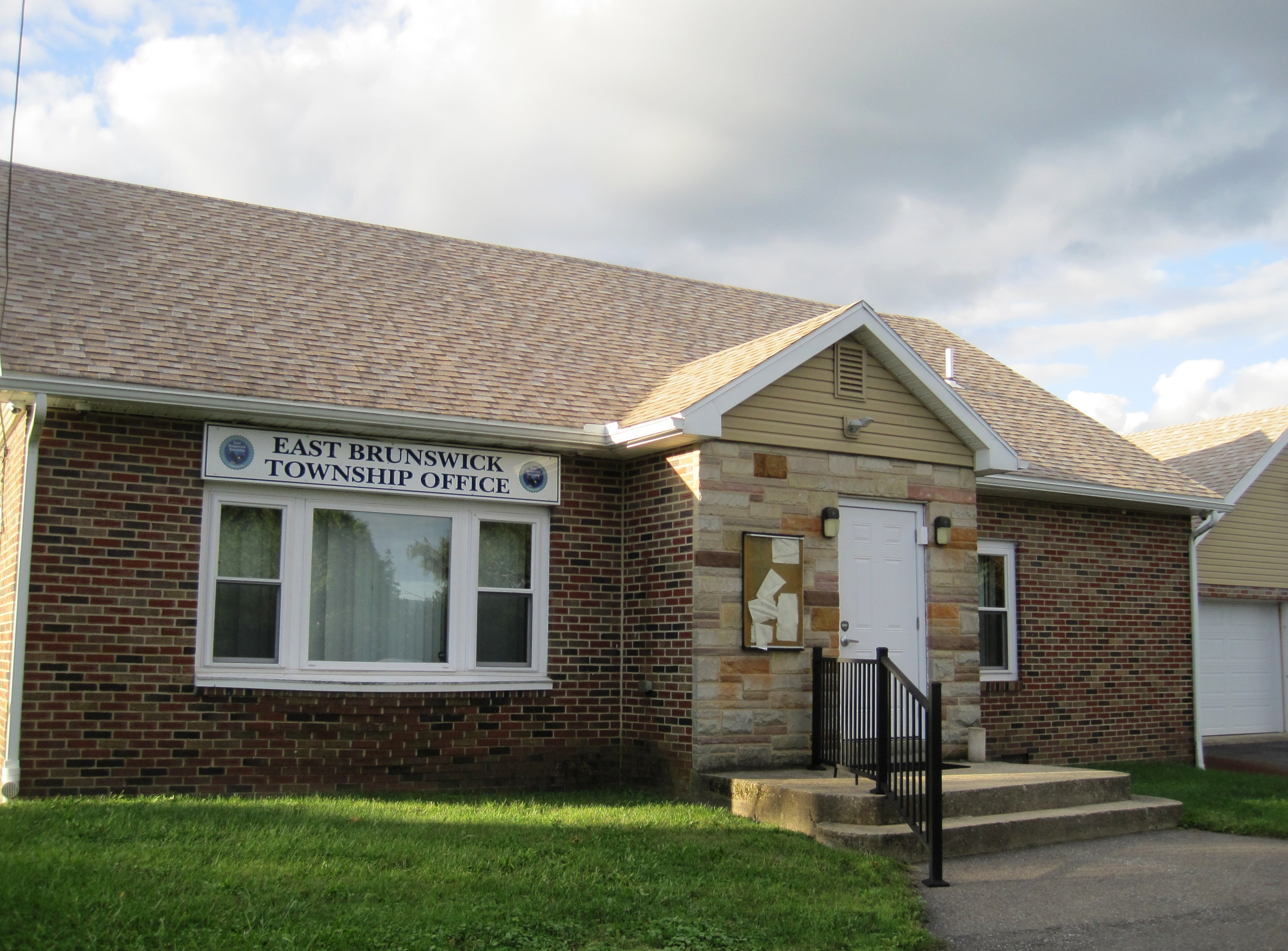
- Town hall

- Seal Logo

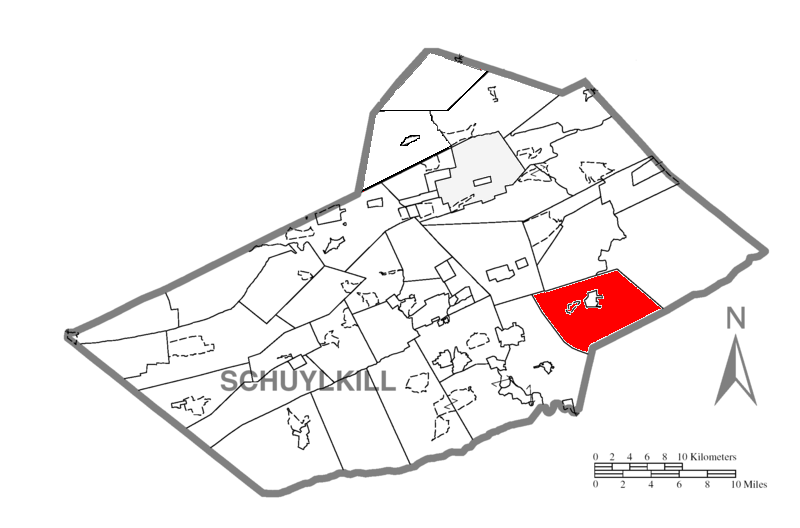
- Location of East Brunswick Township in Schuylkill County, Pennsylvania (above)

- Location of Schuylkill County in Pennsylvania
- Country: United States
- State: Pennsylvania
- County: Schuylkill
- Settled: 1801
- Incorporated: 1834

Area
  - Total: 30.62 sq mi (79.30 km^{2})
  - Land: 30.60 sq mi (79.25 km^{2})
  - Water: 0.019 sq mi (0.05 km^{2})

Population (2020)
  - Total: 1,846 ▲
  - Estimate (2023): 1,877
  - Density: 57.5/sq mi (22.19/km^{2})
- Time zone: UTC-5 (Eastern (EST))
  - Summer (DST): UTC-4 (EDT)
- Area code: 570
- FIPS code: 42-107-20880
- Website: eastbrunswicktownshippa.org

East Brunswick Township is a township in Schuylkill County, Pennsylvania. Brunswick Township was formed in 1801 as one of the original townships of Schuylkill County, being named for Brunswick (Braunschweig), Germany. In 1834, Brunswick Township was divided into East and West Brunswick Townships. Today both townships are served by the Blue Mountain School District.

== History ==
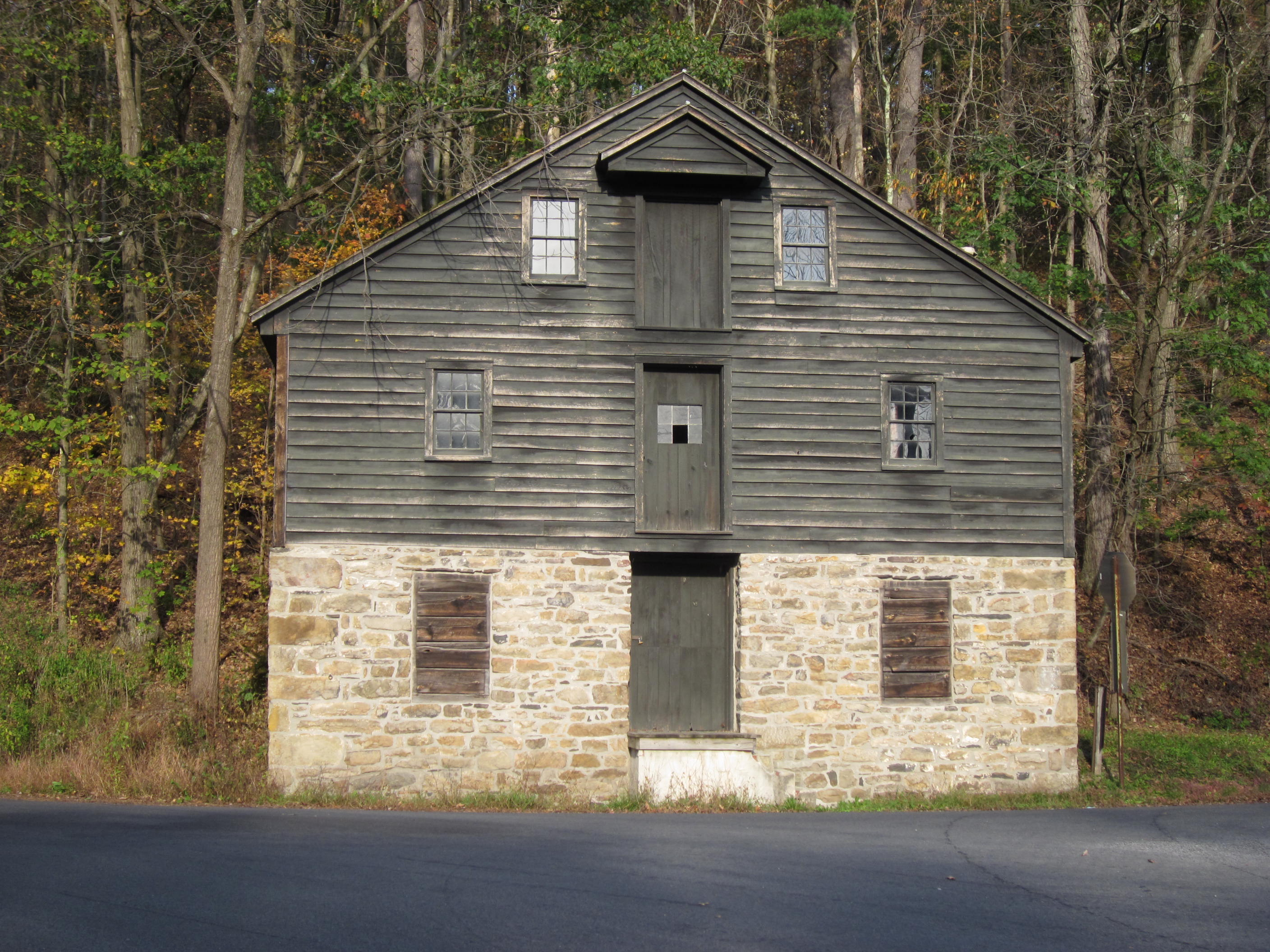
New Ringgold Gristmill in East Brunswick Township

The New Ringgold Gristmill was added to the National Register of Historic Places in 1978.

== Geography ==
According to the U.S. Census Bureau, the township has a total area of 30.5 square miles (79 km^{2}) of which 30.5 square miles (79 km^{2}) is land and 0.04 square miles (0.10 km^{2}) (0.07%) is water. It is in the Schuylkill watershed and the Little Schuylkill River, which flows southward through the township, drains almost all of it except for an extreme west portion drained by the Pine Creek via Deer Lake directly to the Schuylkill River. Blue Mountain separates it from Berks County.

Routes 443 and 895 serve the township and run together between New Ringgold and McKeansburg. The unincorporated communities of East Brunswick include Drehersville, which is also in West Brunswick, Hecla, Kepner, which is in West Penn, McKeansburg, Rauschs, and Rene Mont.

=== Neighboring municipalities ===
- West Brunswick Township (west)
- Blythe Township (northwest)
- Walker Township (north)
- West Penn Township (northeast)
- Albany Township, Berks County (southeast)
- New Ringgold (surrounded)

== Demographics ==
Historical population
Census	Pop.	Note	%±
2010	1,793		—
2020	1,846		3.0%
2023 (est.)	1,877		1.7%
U.S. Decennial Census

As of the census of 2000, there were 1,601 people, 616 households and 473 families residing in the township. The population density was 52.5/sq mi (20.3/km^{2}). There were 679 housing units at an average density of 22.3/sq mi (8.6/km^{2}). The racial makeup of the township was 98.50% White, 0.06% Native American, 0.44% Asian, and 1.00% from two or more races. Hispanic or Latino of any race were 0.50% of the population.

There were 616 households, of which 32.8% had children under the age of 18 living with them, 66.7% were married couples living together, 6.7% had a female householder with no husband present, and 23.1% were non-families. 20.0% of all households were made up of individuals, and 10.1% had someone living alone who was 65 years of age or older. The average household size was 2.60 and the average family size was 2.99.

In the township the population was spread out, with 23.3% under the age of 18, 6.1% from 18 to 24, 31.0% from 25 to 44, 25.4% from 45 to 64, and 14.1% who were 65 years of age or older. The median age was 40 years. For every 100 females there were 102.9 males. For every 100 females age 18 and over, there were 101.6 males.

The median income for a household in the township was $39,821, and the median income for a family was $45,893. Males had a median income of $33,194 versus $22,679 for females. The per capita income for the township was $19,737. About 4.1% of families and 5.0% of the population were below the poverty line, including 4.1% of those under age 18 and 9.5% of those age 65 or over.

== Recreation ==
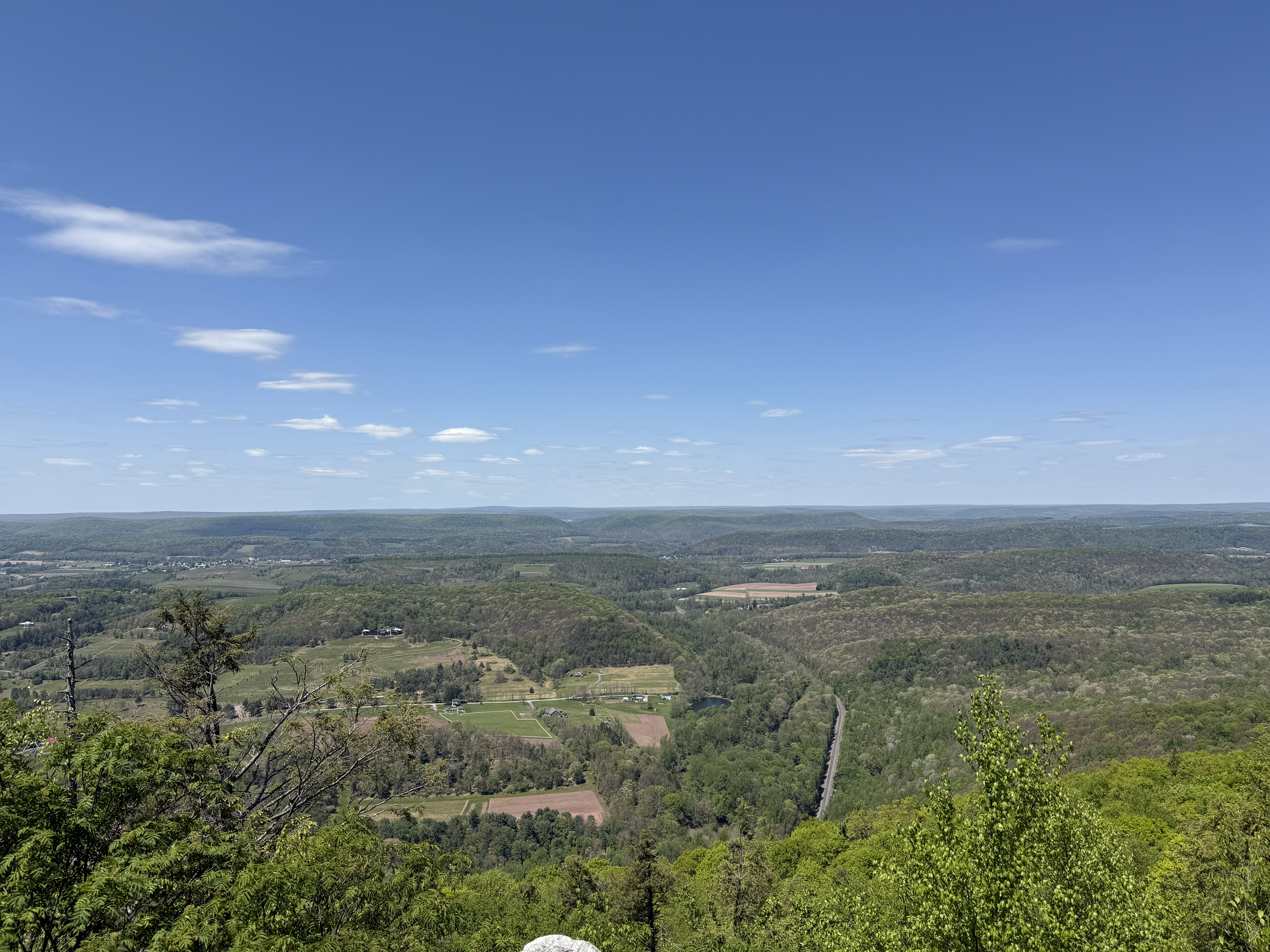
East Brunswick Township from lookout at Hawk Mountain Sanctuary

The Appalachian National Scenic Trail and portions of the Pennsylvania State Game Lands Number 106 are located along the southern border of the township.

== Notable person ==
- Daniel Koch, former Pennsylvania state legislator
