= Pennsylvania Route 645 =

State highway in Pennsylvania, US

Pennsylvania Route 645

Route information
- Maintained by PennDOT
- Length: 14.120 mi (22.724 km)
- Existed: April 17, 1962–present

Major junctions
- South end: US 422 in Myerstown
- I-78 / US 22 in Bethel Township
- North end: PA 443 in Pine Grove Township

Location
- Country: United States
- State: Pennsylvania
- Counties: Lebanon, Berks, Schuylkill

Highway system
- Pennsylvania State Route System; Interstate; US; State; Scenic; Legislative
← PA 643	→ PA 646

Pennsylvania Route 645 (PA 645) is a state highway in the U.S. state of Pennsylvania. The route runs from U.S. Route 422 (US 422) in Myerstown, Lebanon County north to PA 443 in Pine Grove Township, Schuylkill County. PA 645 heads north from Myerstown into agricultural areas and enters Berks County, where it passes through Frystown and comes to an interchange with Interstate 78 (I-78)/US 22. Past here, the route heads across forested Blue Mountain and continues into Schuylkill County, where it reaches its northern terminus. PA 645 is a two-lane undivided road its entire length. The road was paved for a short distance north of Myerstown by 1928. The paved portion was extended to Frystown in the 1930s and north of there by 1953. PA 645 was designated onto its current alignment in 1962.

== Route description ==
PA 645 begins at an intersection with US 422 at the north edge of the borough of Myerstown in Lebanon County, where North Locust Street heads south into Myerstown. From this intersection, the route heads north on two-lane undivided North Locust Street into Jackson Township, passing near residential neighborhoods. PA 645 runs through agricultural areas with some homes, curving northwest briefly before turning north again onto Kutztown Road. The road passes through the residential community of Kutztown before it heads back into farmland. The route turns east onto East Rosebud Road before it heads north onto Hilltop Road, passing through a mix of farms and residential development and curving northwest.

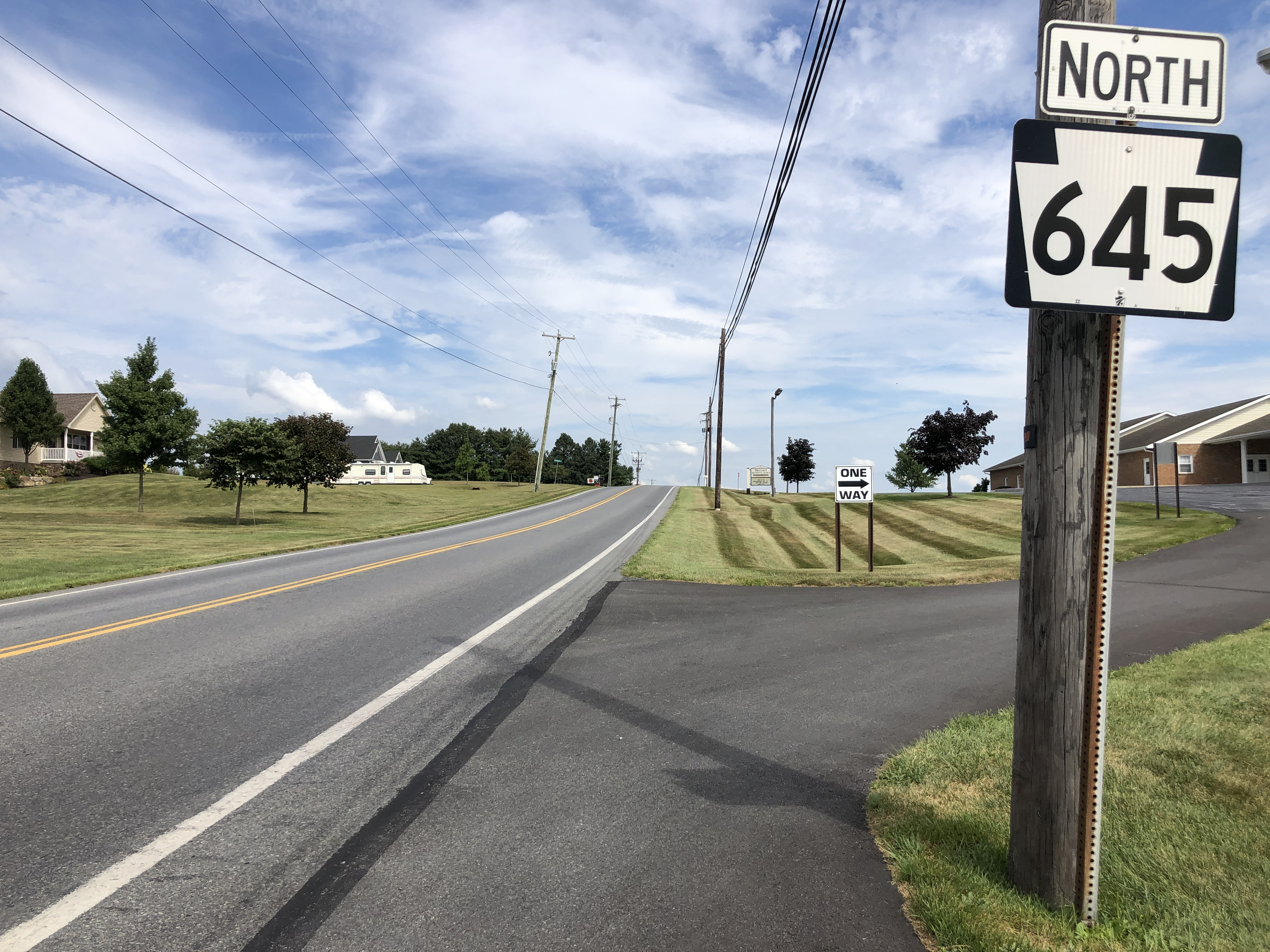
PA 645 northbound in Tulpehocken Township

The route enters Tulpehocken Township in Berks County and becomes Camp Swatara Road, running north-northwest through agricultural areas with some homes and commercial development. PA 645 crosses the Little Swatara Creek into Bethel Township, where it turns north. The road passes through the residential community of Frystown, where it intersects Frystown Road, before running through more farmland. The route passes near businesses and comes to an interchange with I-78/US 22. Past this interchange, the road heads through farmland and woodland with some homes. PA 645 turns to the west and enters forested areas, where it begins to ascend Blue Mountain. The route turns to the north and continues to climb the mountain, heading to the northeast. At the summit of Blue Mountain, PA 645 crosses the Appalachian Trail and heads into Pine Grove Township in Schuylkill County. At this point, the name becomes Geary Wolf Road and the road winds north to descend the forested mountain. At the bottom of the mountain, the route heads through a mix of farmland and woodland with some homes, passing through the community of Brookside. PA 645 passes near residences and an industrial park, crossing Swatara Creek before it reaches its northern terminus at an intersection with PA 443 south of the borough of Pine Grove.

== History ==
When routes were first legislated in Pennsylvania in 1911, present-day PA 645 was not given a legislative number. By 1928, the road from Myerstown to a point north of Kutztown was paved while the remainder was unpaved; at this time the road was unnumbered. The road was paved north to Frystown in the 1930s. By 1953, the road north of Frystown was paved. PA 645 was designated on April 17, 1962, to run between US 422 in Myerstown and PA 443 near Pine Grove. The route was created in order to provide a route number at the Frystown interchange of I-78/US 22. PA 645 has remained on the same alignment since it was designated.

== Major intersections ==
County	Location	mi	km	Destinations	Notes
Lebanon	Myerstown	0.000	0.000	US 422 (West Lincoln Avenue) – Reading, Lebanon	Southern terminus
Berks	Bethel Township	6.865	11.048	I-78 / US 22 – Harrisburg, Allentown	Exit 10 (I-78/US 22)
Schuylkill	Pine Grove Township	14.120	22.724	PA 443 (Suedberg Road) to I-81 – Fort Indiantown Gap, Pine Grove	Northern terminus
1.000 mi = 1.609 km; 1.000 km = 0.621 mi
