= Christian Lower =

American politician (1740–1806)

Christian Lower (January 7, 1740 – December 19, 1806) was a member of the U.S. House of Representatives from Pennsylvania.

== Biography ==
Christian Lower was born on January 7, 1740, in Klapperthall Junction, Tulpehocken Township, Pennsylvania. He worked as a blacksmith and was later proprietor of an iron foundry. During the American Revolution, he served as a colonel of associated battalions in 1775 and sublieutenant in 1780. He was county commissioner of Berks County, Pennsylvania, from 1777 to 1779. He was a member of the Pennsylvania House of Representatives in 1783–1785, 1793, 1794, and 1796. He served in the Pennsylvania State Senate from 1797 to 1804.

Lower was elected as a Republican to the Ninth Congress and served until his death at his home in Klapperthall Junction in Tulpehocken Township, Berks County, Pennsylvania. Interment was initially made at the Tulpehocken Church Burial Ground; his remains were later disinterred and reburied at the Christ Lutheran Cemetery in Stouchsburg, Pennsylvania.

== Family ==
Lower was the grandson of Michael Lauer, who was among the men and women who emigrated from Germany as part of the 18th century mass emigration of German Palatines to the American Colonies. His son, Christian Lauer, was Lower's father. The elder Christian Lauer migrated from New York's Schoharie Region to the Tulpehocken settlement in Berks County, Pennsylvania in 1723, and ultimately became the owner of the Moselem Forge. Michael Lauer then followed in 1728. Twelve years later, Christian Lower was born in Klapperthall Junction.

Lower's sister, Eva Magdalena Lauer (1744–1815), wed Michael Ley, who built the Tulpehocken Manor Plantation near Myerstown, Pennsylvania. Their son (and Lower's nephew), Christian Ley, went on to serve in the Pennsylvania House of Representatives and Pennsylvania State Senate, and later built Nutting Hall, another of Pennsylvania's historic homes.

== See also ==
- List of members of the United States Congress who died in office (1790–1899)
- Nutting Hall (Pine Grove, Pennsylvania)
- Tulpehocken Manor Plantation (near Myerstown, Pennsylvania)

U.S. House of Representatives
Preceded by Isaac Anderson; John Whitehill; Joseph Hiester	Member of the U.S. House of Representatives from Pennsylvania's 3rd congressional district 1805-1806 alongside: Isaac Anderson and John Whitehill	Succeeded by Isaac Anderson; John Whitehill
