= Christian Ley =

American politician

- Born: February 20, 1762; Lebanon County, Pennsylvania
- Died: October 13, 1831 (aged 69); Lebanon County, Pennsylvania
- Occupations: Politician and member of the Pennsylvania House of Representatives
- Spouse: Anna Catherine Koppenhoffer
- Parent(s): Michael and Eva Magdalena Ley

Christian Ley (February 20, 1762 – October 13, 1831) was an American politician who served as a member of the Pennsylvania House of Representatives, serving in the 24th Pennsylvania General Assembly from 1799 to 1802. He subsequently filled the vacant Pennsylvania Senate seat of John Kean, holding that position from 1805 to 1806.

Ley also achieved prominence with his business dealings, and was the man for whom Nutting Hall was built. A historic home located at 205 South Tulpehocken Street in the Borough of Pine Grove, in Schuylkill County, Pennsylvania, it was placed on the National Register of Historic Places on July 23, 1980.

== Formative years ==
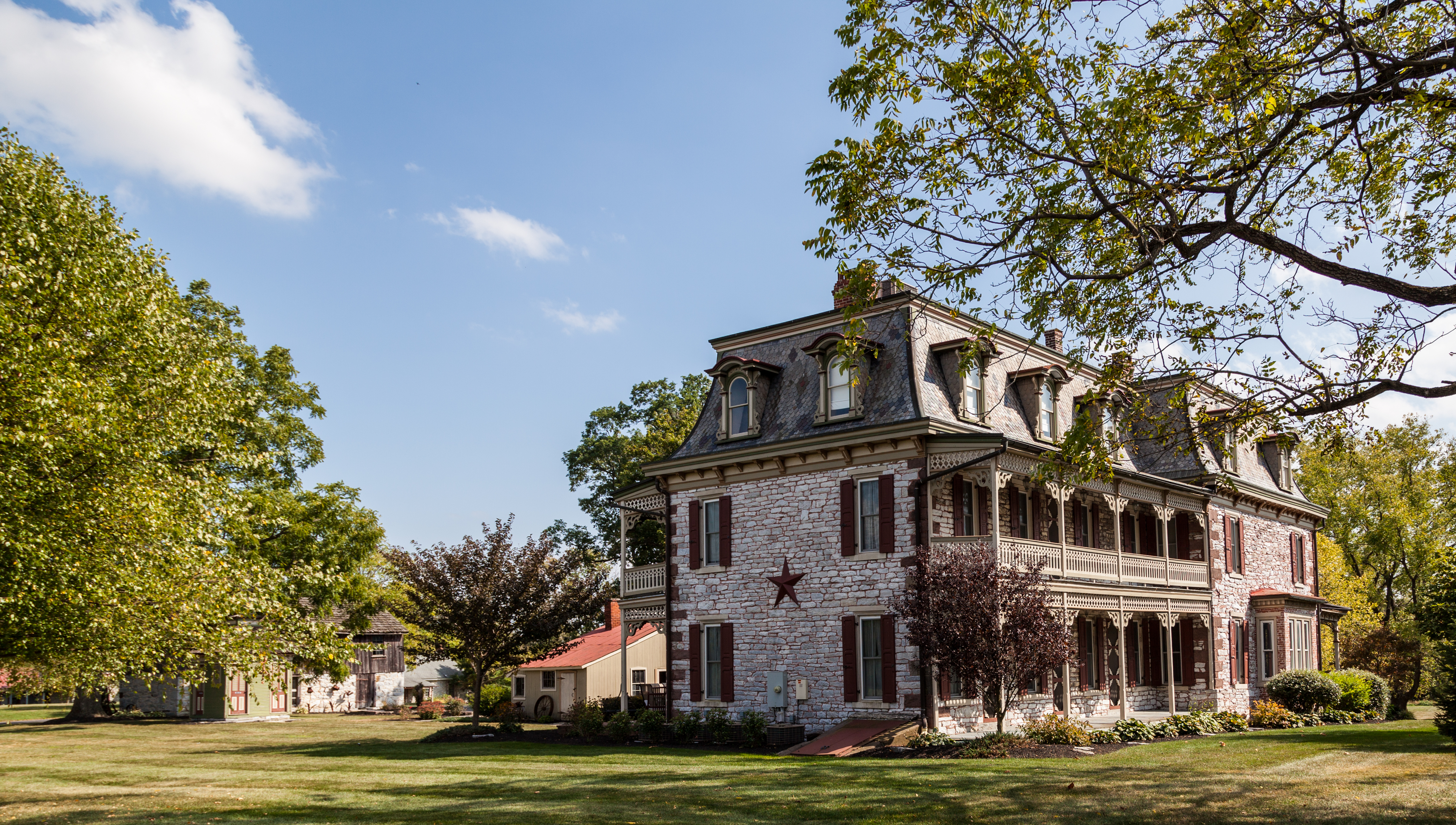
Tulpehocken Manor Plantation, c. 2014.

Born on February 20, 1762, on his family's homestead in Lebanon County, Pennsylvania, near what is, today, the community of Myerstown, Christian Ley was a son of Michael Ley, an officer in the Continental Army, and Eva Magdalena Ley. Raised with his siblings on land which had been granted to his grandfather, Christopher Ley, by the sons of William Penn, Christian Ley grew up in an eight-room, two-story, Georgian-style mansion which had been built by his father on a portion of that Ley family land. Michael Ley's homestead would later come to be known as the Tulpehocken Manor Plantation; it was visited by U.S. President George Washington three times between 1777 and 1794 during the teenage years of Christian Ley.

Trained in agricultural pursuits as a youth, Christian Ley subsequently became a miller during his early adult years. By 1798, he had become so successful as a farmer and miller that his financial holdings were calculated by tax assessors to be the area's highest — totaling $18,182.

== Public service and political career ==
As a member of one of Lebanon County's prominent families and the son of a former officer with the Continental Army during the American Revolution, Christian Ley also chose a path of public service, becoming a driving force behind the planning and development of the western Tulpehocken Lutheran Church and a captain in Pennsylvania's state militia. According to Pennsylvania historian William Henry Egle, Ley was commission captain of the Sixth Company of the Dauphin County Militia's Fourth Battalion, serving under Lieutenant-Colonel James Woods and Major George Bowman. The unit had been one of a number formed in 1792 response to orders from the United States Congress to form a provisional army to address the "encroachments of the European powers upon American rights."

After running unsuccessfully for Pennsylvania's General Assembly (the Pennsylvania House of Representatives) in 1797, in a race in which he placed fifth out of eight candidates, garnering just 155 votes compared to the 306 earned by that year's winner, David Krause, Ley succeeded in being elected to that body before the decade was over. From 1799 to 1802, he represented Lebanon and Dauphin counties in the General Assembly, and was then appointed to fill the Pennsylvania Senate seat which had been vacated by John Kean, serving in that capacity between 1805 and 1806.

== Planning and construction of Nutting Hall ==
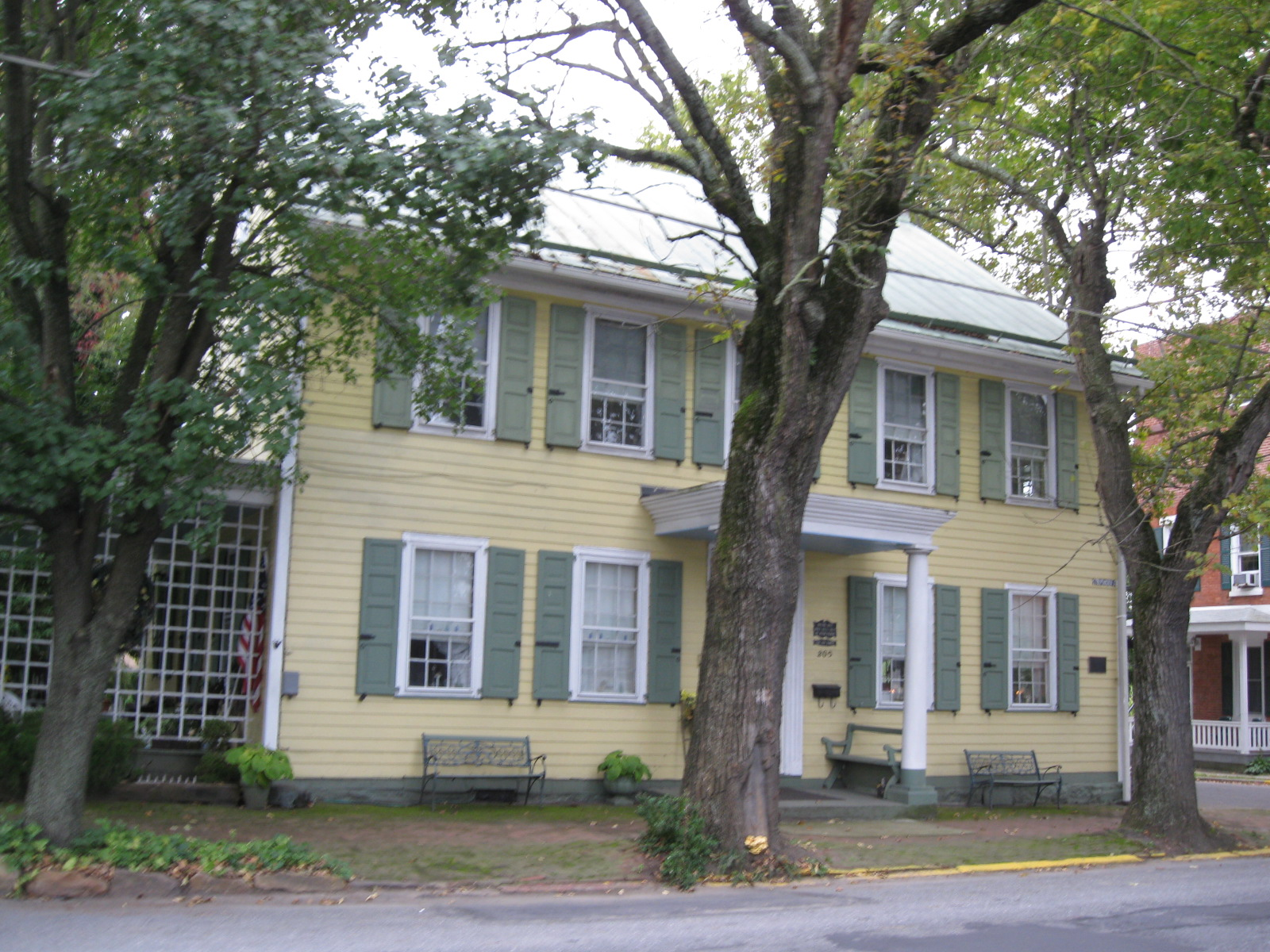
Nutting Hall, c. 2009.

Following the completion of his service with the Pennsylvania Senate, Christian Ley relocated to the Borough of Pine Grove in Schuylkill County, where he became one of that county's prominent businessmen due to his buying, selling and rental of land. It was also during this period that Ley chose to build a new residence for his wife, Anna Catherine Koppenhoffer (1769-1822), and their three children, Christian Jr., John and Catherine. He selected Peter Filbert to perform the work, which was completed between 1823 and 1825. Ley resided there with his family for the remainder of his life.

== Death and interment ==
Preceded in death by his wife, Christian Ley died on October 13, 1831, and was interred at the Union Cemetery in Myerstown, Pennsylvania.

== See also ==
- Nutting Hall (Pine Grove, Pennsylvania)
- Pine Grove Historic District (Pine Grove, Pennsylvania)
- Tulpehocken Manor Plantation (Myerstown, Pennsylvania)
