= Frystown, Pennsylvania =

Unincorporated community in Pennsylvania, US

- Census-designated place
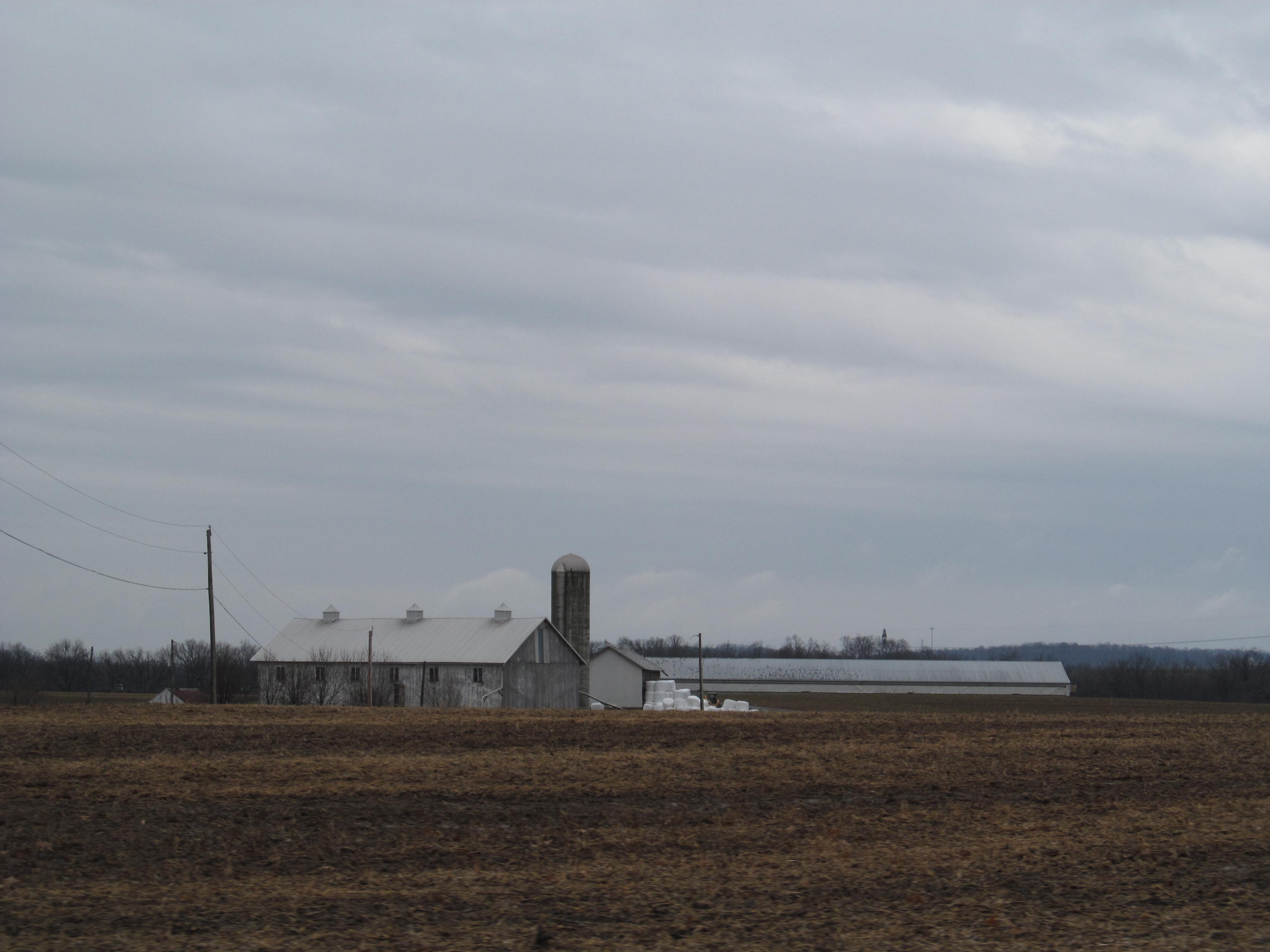

- Location within Pennsylvania Location within the United States
- Coordinates: 40°26′59″N 76°20′03″W
- Country: United States
- State: Pennsylvania
- County: Berks
- Township: Bethel

Area
  - Total: 1.22 sq mi (3.17 km^{2})
  - Land: 1.21 sq mi (3.14 km^{2})
  - Water: 0.012 sq mi (0.03 km^{2})
- Elevation: 466 ft (142 m)

Population (2020)
  - Total: 355
  - Density: 292.8/sq mi (113.04/km^{2})
- Time zone: UTC-5 (Eastern (EST))
  - Summer (DST): UTC-4 (EDT)
- ZIP codes: 17067 & 19507
- Area code: 717
- FIPS code: 42-28128
- GNIS feature ID: 1175322

Frystown is a census-designated place in Bethel Township, in far western Berks County, Pennsylvania, United States. It is located near the township line with Tulpehocken Township. The community is served by the Tulpehocken Area School District. As of the 2010 census, the population was 380 residents. The Little Swatara Creek forms the natural southern boundary of Frystown and flows westward into the Swatara Creek, a tributary of the Susquehanna River. Interstate 78 has an interchange with Route 645 in Frystown. The CDP is split between the Myerstown and Bethel post offices, which use the ZIP codes of 17067 and 19507, respectively.

== Demographics ==
Historical population
Census	Pop.	Note	%±
2020	355		—
U.S. Decennial Census

== See also ==
Media related to Frystown, Pennsylvania at Wikimedia Commons
