= Tulpehocken Manor Plantation =

Historic house in Pennsylvania, United States

- U.S. National Register of Historic Places
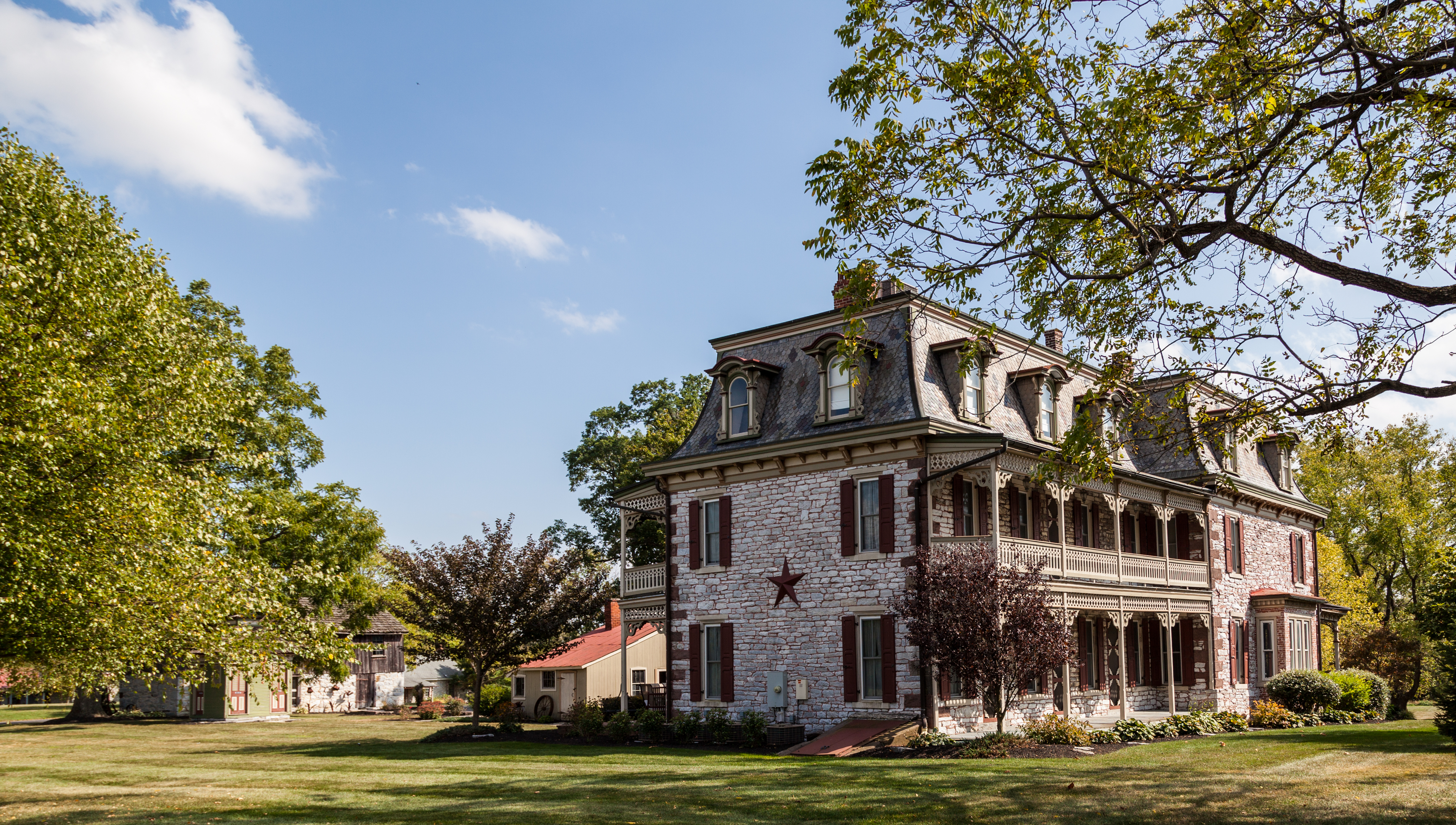

- Location within Pennsylvania Location within the United States
- Location: 2 miles (3.2 km) west of Myerstown on U.S. Route 422, Jackson Township, Pennsylvania
- Coordinates: 40°21′48″N 76°20′25″W
- Area: 150 acres (61 ha)
- Built: c. 1740, 1769, 1883
- Architectural style: Georgian, Second Empire, "Swiss bank"
- NRHP reference No.: 75001648
- Added to NRHP: May 12, 1975

Tulpehocken Manor Plantation, also known as the Ley Home, is a historic property which is located near Myerstown, Jackson Township, Lebanon County, Pennsylvania.

Added to the National Register of Historic Places on May 12, 1975, the building now serves as the headquarters of the Hanover Rifle Battalion, Revolutionary War re-enactors.

== History ==
A historic home which was awarded National Register status on May 12, 1975, the Tulpehocken Manor Plantation is tied to both the late 18th century mass emigration of German Palatines to the American Colonies and to George Washington, the first President of the United States through its association with the Ley family, whose patriarch, Christopher Ley (1695-1745), came to America from the German Palatinate in 1732. A recipient of an early to mid-1700s land grant from the sons of William Penn near what is today Myerstown, Pennsylvania, Christopher Ley quickly began to improve that land and build a life with his wife, Barbara. Among their nine children was son Michael Ley (1739-1824), who first met United States President George Washington as a boy, a relationship that would continue well into Michael Ley's adult years.

Still residing in the vicinity of Myerstown during his 20s and 30s, Michael Ley then became the owner of his father's land after paying 680 pounds for it on November 6, 1760. Nine years later, he finished building his own residence there. An eight-room, two-story mansion, it was initially designed in a Georgian style and would ultimately come to be known as the Tulpehocken Manor Plantation. It was also where he would raise a family with his wife, Eva Magdalena (Lower) Ley, who was a daughter of Christian Lower (1740-1806), a blacksmith who became actively involved in the American Revolution and served as a member of the Pennsylvania House of Representatives. Their children included son Christian Ley (1762-1831), who would also go on to serve in the Pennsylvania House from 1799 to 1802, and would also later build another of Pennsylvania's historic homes, Nutting Hall.

Within a few short years, Michael Ley's residence (Tulpehocken Manor) would come to be known as a place of relaxation for President Washington, most notably during three trips that Washington made to Lebanon County between 1777 and 1794. During the first, Washington traveled to Ley's home from Valley Forge, where the Continental Army was encamped, for a brief respite from his military command duties. On two subsequent visits, he specifically visited the property to inspect work on four locks that were under construction there as part of Pennsylvania's Union Canal system.

Despite the close connection with America's first President and Michael Ley's own service as an officer in the Continental Army, the Ley family underwent serious financial hardships following the Revolutionary War. Having spent significant sums of money to support Washington's troops during the war and then having also lost heavily when their coal industry speculations failed post-war, they were forced to repeatedly mortgage their property until finally losing it in a sheriff's sale in 1834 to Conrad Loos. Loos then subsequently transferred the home and land to his daughter, Elizabeth, and her husband, Cyrus Shark. Their daughter, Eliza, then became the owner during the 1880s after her husband, Samuel Urich, purchased the property. During their tenure of ownership, they remodeled and enlarged the residence into a 27-room Victorian manor house with a mansard roof, a process which took place between 1883 and 1885. Subsequently, purchasing two houses and land to the east from the Spangler family, they also then bought a small frame house on the western side of the property in 1886. That small building then became known as the Cyrus Sherk Pipe Smoking House.

In 1960, the Urich family sold the buildings and land to John S. Nissly, his daughter, Esther E. Nissly, and James Henry.

The Tulpehocken Manor Plantation was added to the National Register of Historic Places on May 12, 1975. From May 2 to May 3, 1997, the entire contents of the inn and plantation were sold at auction by James G. Cochran, Auctioneer, of Boonboro, Maryland. According to pre-sale newspaper advertisements that were published in February 1997, "The contents of the twenty-seven room Michael Ley Mansion, the guest houses and outbuildings on the 160 acre plantation include a sulfur inlaid walnut Kas dated 1771; painted architectural corner cupboard with glass doors; a Charles Cooner-Lebanon tall case clock; a painted mantel and pediment dated 1769 and all original to the home; painted benches; fireplace and cooking items; over 50 quilts; oriental, hooked and braided rugs; over ten walnut Victorian bedroom sets; many marble top tables; a mohair Victorian parlor set and other sofas and chairs; Victorian cellerette; ornate walnut organ; wall clocks; chandeliers and lamps; gilded pier mirrors and overmantels; hall trees; towel racks; many nice paintings and prints; a double silhouette of Mr. and Mrs. Mier - founders of Myerstown; stoneware; china and glassware; carriages; farm equipment; vehicles; tools and many other items not mentioned" (which were subsequently printed in the auctioneer's catalog for the sale that was released on March 15, 1997).

Tulpehocken Manor currently serves as the headquarters of the Hanover Rifle Battalion, Revolutionary War reenactors.

== Architecture and grounds ==
In addition to the manor house, which was initially constructed in the Georgian style as an eight-room, two-story mansion, and then remodeled and enlarged in the Second Empire style in 1883, the property is home to 18 contributing buildings, one contributing site, and four contributing structures, including a small gambrel roofed dwelling known as the Cyrus Sherk House, a mid-19th century stone bank barn, numerous sheds and other farm outbuildings, a seven-seat outhouse, a large stone quarry, and the ruins of four locks from the Union Canal which were built in 1794.

== See also ==
- Nutting Hall (Pine Grove, Pennsylvania)
