= Richard Wheeler =

Richard Wheeler may refer to:

- Richard S. Wheeler (1935–2019), American novelist and newspaper editor
- Richard "Dick" Wheeler (1922–2008), American military historian
- Dick Wheeler (1898–1962), American baseball player
