= Immel =

Immel is a surname. Notable people with the surname include:

- Eike Immel (born 1960), German football goalkeeper and manager
- Jan-Olaf Immel (born 1976), German team handball player
- Jerrold Immel (born 1936), American television music composer

== See also ==
- John Immel House
