= Clamtown, Pennsylvania =

Unincorporated community in Pennsylvania, US

Coordinates: 40.693°N 75.993°W

Clamtown is an unincorporated community on Route 443 in West Penn Township, Pennsylvania, United States, approximately five miles south of Tamaqua. The Little Schuylkill River forms its natural northern and western boundaries and separates it from Walker Township. It is split between the post offices of New Ringgold and Tamaqua, with the zip codes of 17960 and 18252, respectively. Clamtown is in Area Code 570 served by the 386 exchange.

== Local features ==
Clamtown is a village surrounded by rolling, forested mountains. There is a small creek running directly through the village that feeds into the Little Schuylkill River. The village also has a small lake commonly known as the "Little Schuylkill Lake" that is just outside of it. Some fish such as trout can be found there. The lake itself is presumed to be manmade, due to the abandoned train depot directly next to it. In the 1950s and 1960s, Clamtown residents dealt with the health, road safety, and sanitation problems caused by black dust blowing from a nearby desilting basin owned by the Pennsylvania Department of Forests and Waters.
