= Walker Township, Pennsylvania =

Walker Township is the name of some places in the U.S. state of Pennsylvania:

- Walker Township, Centre County, Pennsylvania
- Walker Township, Huntingdon County, Pennsylvania
- Walker Township, Juniata County, Pennsylvania
- Walker Township, Schuylkill County, Pennsylvania
