= Nutting Hall =

Historic house in Pennsylvania, United States

- U.S. National Register of Historic Places
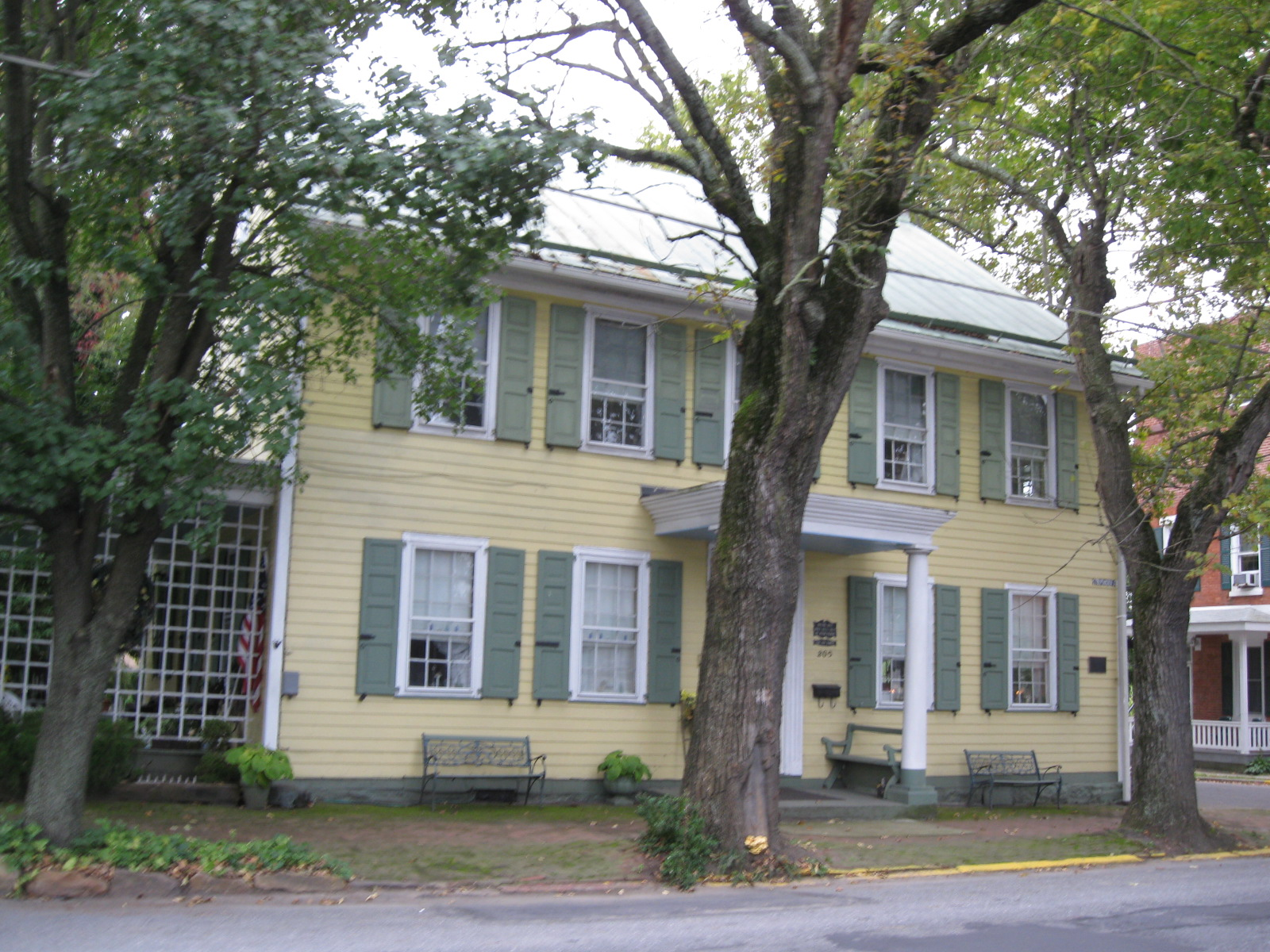
- Nutting Hall in 2009

- Location within Pennsylvania Location within the United States
- Location: 205 S. Tulpehocken St., Pine Grove, Pennsylvania
- Coordinates: 40°32′48″N 76°23′5″W
- Area: 0.5 acres (0.20 ha)
- Built: 1823-1825
- Built by: Filbert, Peter
- NRHP reference No.: 80003627
- Added to NRHP: July 23, 1980

Nutting Hall is a historic home located at 205 South Tulpehocken Street in the Borough of Pine Grove, in Schuylkill County, Pennsylvania. Erected between 1823 and 1825 for Christian Lay who had, as a boy, met and come to know American President George Washington, it was built by Peter Filbert, a pioneering industrialist who was involved in Pine Grove's founding.

Currently owned by Margery Wheeler Mattox, who purchased it after it had been converted to rental apartments by the former owner, it was restored over a period of 25 years by Mattox before being placed on the National Register of Historic Places on July 23, 1980. The home still retains its original wood siding.

== Architectural features ==
Built between 1823 and 1825, Nutting Hall is a 2 1/2-story, five bay wide frame dwelling, with a 2 1/2-story rear ell and gable roof. Measuring 40 feet by 60 feet, it sits on a stone foundation on its lot at 205 South Tulpehocken Street in Pine Grove, Pennsylvania.

== History ==
A historic home which was awarded National Register status in 1980, Nutting Hall is tied to both the late 18th century mass emigration of German Palatines to the American Colonies and to George Washington, the first President of the United States through its association with the Ley family, whose patriarch, Christopher Ley (1695-1745), came to America from the German Palatinate in 1732. Ley, who would ultimately become the grandfather of Nutting Hall's first owner (Christian Ley, Sr.), began his family with wife Barbara in what is now Myerstown, Pennsylvania. Among their nine children was son Michael Ley (1739-1824), who built Myerstown's historic Tulpehocken Manor Plantation, where Washington stayed during three visits to Lebanon County between 1777 and 1794.

It was Michael Ley's son, Christian Ley (1762-1831), who went on to build what would eventually become "Nutting Hall," and to also serve in the Pennsylvania House of Representatives from 1799 to 1802 and then, for one year, in the Pennsylvania Senate. Thirty-two years old at the time that Washington made his final visit to Tulpehocken Manor, Christian Ley was representing Lebanon and Dauphin Counties in the Pennsylvania House during this time. He then relocated to Pine Grove in Schuylkill County, where he became one of that county's prominent businessmen due to his buying and selling of land. It was during this period that Christian Ley contracted with Peter Filbert to erect a new residence for his wife, Anna Catherine Koppenhoffer (1769-1822), and their three children, Christian Jr., John and Catherine.

Completed by Filbert between 1823 and 1825, that home was occupied by Christian Ley and his family until Ley's death in 1831. It was then sold in 1837 to William Graeff, a tanner who had opened a large general store in Pine Grove. Following Graeff's death in 1873, the home was then inherited by his daughter, Barbara Ann, who had married Bowdoin College graduate James L. Nutting (1818-1880), the owner of a large farm in nearby Brookside, Pennsylvania who went on to become a public and private school teacher and school director in Pine Grove. Barbara Ann (Graeff) Nutting and her husband, who also had interests in the coal and iron industry, had three children, only one of whom (Anne) survived to adulthood.

That child, Anne Nutting, then went on to marry Richard Wigton in the backyard at Nutting Hall and, following her father's death in 1880, became the next to inherit the historic home. She and her husband subsequently had three children of their own: Jeanette (born in 1882), Kathryn, Nutting, Elizabeth and Richard (born in 1883). Her son, Richard, then became the home's sole owner, and continued to maintain ownership until his death in 1952.

At this point, the home was sold to Reuben and Anne Riggen. This was the first time in the history of Nutting Hall that the home and property had left the family. Owned by the Riggens for ten years, it was then sold to Glenn Schell in 1963, who converted parts of the home into individual apartments.

=== Later history ===
Nutting Hall's construction date and name of its builder, Peter Filbert, reportedly were still visible on the home's original plaster from its completion in 1825 until the 1963 apartment conversion.

In 1974, Margery Wheeler Mattox purchased Nutting Hall from Glenn Schell, and launched a 25-year restoration initiative. A native of Reading, Pennsylvania, Mattox had fond memories of watching Decoration Day parades across the street from Nutting Hall while visiting relatives in Pine Grove during her childhood, and had previously restored historic homes in New Smithville (near Allentown) and Aspers (near Gettysburg). Following its restoration, the home was then placed on the National Register of Historic Places on July 23, 1980.

In 1997, Mattox's brother, Richard "Dick" Wheeler, came to live with Mattox at Nutting Hall. A World War II veteran who went on to become a military historian and author of 17 books, including The Bloody Battle for Suribachi, Dick Wheeler was frequently contacted for technical advice about the Battle of Iwo Jima by film and television writers and directors, including those involved with the development and release of Flags of Our Fathers, and continued to reside with Mattox at Nutting Hall until his death there in 2008.

In 2011, Aperture Press published Mattox's book, A Lifetime of Illusions.

== See also ==
- Pine Grove Historic District (Pine Grove, Pennsylvania)
- Tulpehocken Manor Plantation (Myerstown, Pennsylvania)
