= Isaac Meier Homestead =

Historic house in Pennsylvania, United States

- U.S. National Register of Historic Places
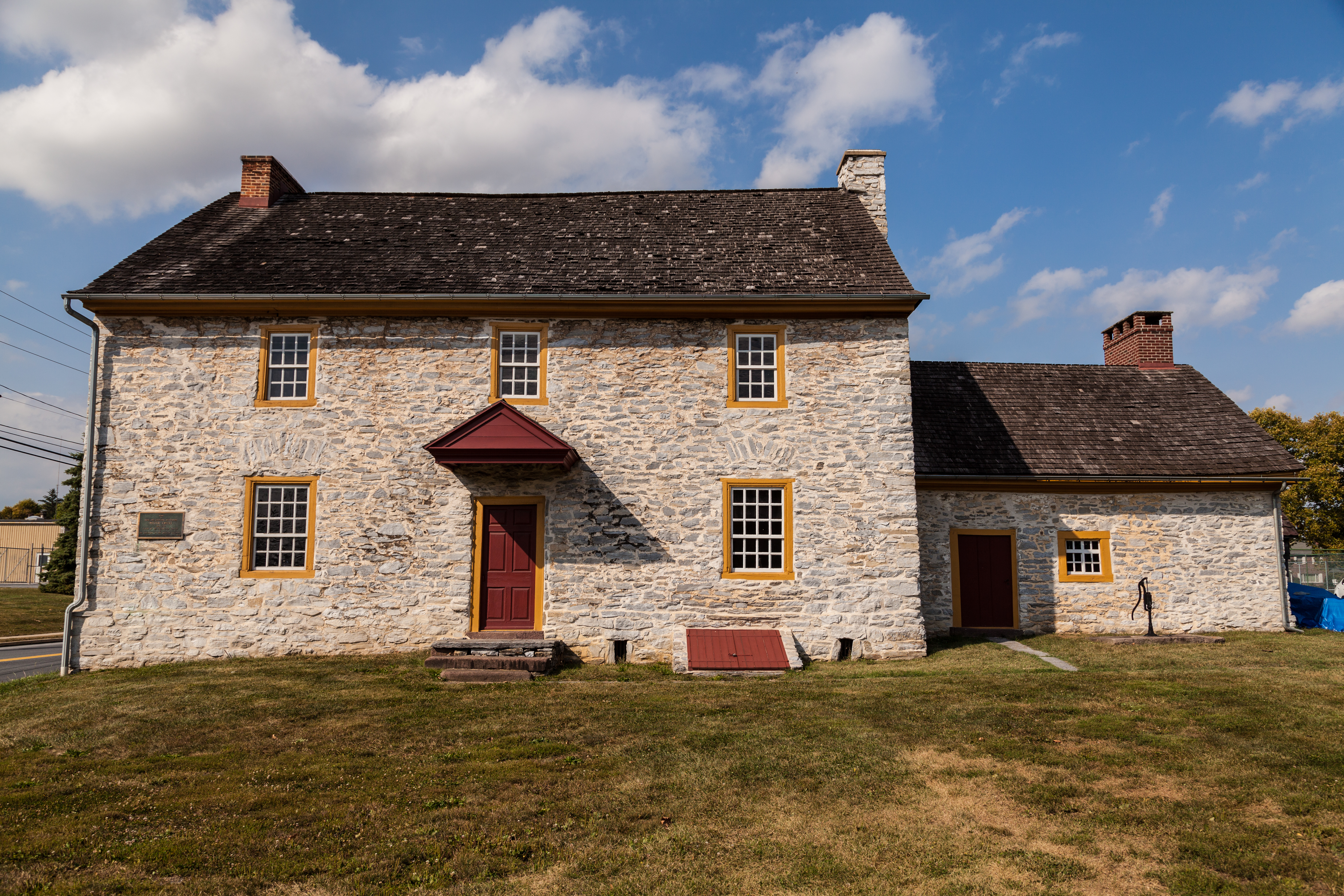

- Location within Pennsylvania Location within the United States
- Location: 524 S. College St., Myerstown, Pennsylvania
- Coordinates: 40°22′9″N 76°18′19″W
- Area: 0.3 acres (0.12 ha)
- Built: c. 1750
- NRHP reference No.: 73001639
- Added to NRHP: April 2, 1973

The Isaac Meier Homestead, also known as "The Old Fort," Isaac Myer Homestead, Isaac Meyers Homestead, and Isaac Myers Homestead, is an historic home which is located in Myerstown, Lebanon County, Pennsylvania, United States.

It was added to the National Register of Historic Places in 1973.

== History and architectural features ==
Built circa 1750, this historic structure is a 2 1/2-story, three-bay-wide limestone residence. It has a 1 1/2-story kitchen wing that pre-dates the main house, and is one of the oldest buildings in Myerstown. It was the home of its founder Isaac Meier.
