= Deturksville, Pennsylvania =

Unincorporated community in Pennsylvania

Deturksville (De Turksville on federal maps) is an unincorporated community in Schuylkill County, in the U.S. state of Pennsylvania. Deturksville is located along Pennsylvania Route 443 in Washington Township.

== History ==
A post office called De Turksville was established in 1876, and remained in operation until it was discontinued in 1905.
