= Richard "Dick" Wheeler =

American historian and writer

- Born: January 8, 1922; Reading, Pennsylvania. U.S.
- Died: October 21, 2008 (aged 86); Nutting Hall, Pine Grove, Pennsylvania, U.S.
- Occupations: Historian; author

Richard "Dick" Wheeler (August 1, 1922 – October 21, 2008) was an American military historian who authored seventeen books and served as a military consultant for multiple film and television projects. A member of the United States Marine Corp's Easy Company, (2nd Battalion, 28th Marines, 5th Marine Division) during World War II, he was seriously wounded during the Battle of Iwo Jima.

Post-war, he penned an account of that battle, The Bloody Battle for Suribachi, and became a military historian. Following his first book's release in 1965, he then published additional works, including Voices of the Civil War in 1976 and Iwo, which was released in 1980. He received a 1973 Christopher Award for Voices of 1776 and the Fletcher Pratt Award for Voices of the Civil War.

== Formative years ==
Born on January 8, 1922, in the city of Reading in Berks County, Pennsylvania, Wheeler was a son of Reading native Clarence E. Wheeler and Margaret (Wenrich) Wheeler, a native of Pine Grove, Schuylkill County, Pennsylvania. He and his sister, Marjery, subsequently spent their formative years in Laureldale, Pennsylvania after relocating there with their parents in 1926.

Editor of the Muhlenberg Township High School newspaper during his senior year of school, he secured a job as a writer for the Reading Shopping Bulletin after graduating, and worked there until he enlisted in the United States Marine Corps.

== Military service ==
Following the attack by Japanese military forces on Pearl Harbor on December 7, 1941, Wheeler promptly enlisted for World War II military service. After enrolling with the United States Marine Corps, he was assigned to the corps' Easy Company, 2nd Battalion, 28th Marines, 5th Marine Division. Seriously wounded during the Battle of Iwo Jima in 1945 while serving with Easy Company as a private first class, he spent a significant period of time recuperating from his injuries before heading home after being honorably discharged.

According to Major General Fred Haynes, in a later analysis of his combat experiences, Wheeler said:

"It's true that a combat team must be composed mainly of cautious men; wholesale heedlessness under fire would certainly bring the team to disaster. But there is also a need for an audacious minority. It's this minority that sets the pace for an attack. If everyone were to dig in deeply and move only when it was really necessary—which is all that duty requires—the team's effort would lack vigor. There must be a scattering of men who neglect their safety and act with a daring initiative. Most of the tough feats that win the medals are performed by men like this."

== Post-war life and publishing career ==
After returning home from his World War II service, Wheeler returned to his job with the Reading Shopping Bulletin. Over time, he also began to secure work as a freelance writer of poetry and prose for various national publications, including the Saturday Evening Post.

In 1965, he published his first book, The Bloody Battle for Suribachi, which he based on his diary entries and recollections of the Battle of Iwo Jima. As additional print and audio books followed, he became an increasingly respected military history writer and consultant to film and television writers and directors, including those involved with the development and release of Flags of Our Fathers.

=== Works by Richard Wheeler ===
- The Bloody Battle for Suribachi. New York, New York: Crowell, 1965. OCLC 1416031

• Voices of 1776, New York New York, Crowell, 1972.

- Voices of the Civil War. New York, New York: Crowell, 1976. OCLC 1818393
- We Knew Stonewall Jackson. New York, New York: Crowell, 1977. OCLC 918284789
- We Knew William Tecumseh Sherman. New York, New York: Crowell, 1976. OCLC 918287385
- Sherman's March. New York, New York: Crowell, 1978. OCLC 493675572
- Iwo. New York, New York: Lippincott & Crowell, 1980. OCLC 252378851
- A Special Valor: The U.S. Marines and the Pacific War. New York, New York: Harper & Row, 1983. OCLC 10341353
- Sword Over Richmond: An eyewitness history of McClellan's Peninsula campaign. New York, New York: Harper & Row, 1986. OCLC 645872536
- Wheeler, Richard and Bronson Pinchot. Witness to Gettysburg: Inside the battle that changed the course of the Civil War (audiobook). Blackstone Audio, 1987. OCLC 933390971
- Voices of the Civil War. New York, New York: Meridian, 1990. OCLC 214987653
- On Fields of Fury: From the Wilderness to the Crater, an eyewitness history. New York, New York: Harper Collins, 1991. OCLC 906559833
- Lee's Terrible Swift Sword: From Antietam to Chancellorsville: An eyewitness history. New York, New York: Harper Perennial, 1992. OCLC 317849296
- A Rising Thunder: From Lincoln's Election to the Battle of Bull Run: An eyewitness history. New York, New York: Harper Collins, 1994. OCLC 924842097
- The Bloody Battle for Suribachi. Annapolis, Maryland: Naval Institute Press, 1994. OCLC 60283569
- Iwo. Annapolis, Maryland: Naval Institute Press, 1994. OCLC 31693687
- Gettysburg 1863: Campaign of endless echoes. New York, New York: Plume, 1999. OCLC 40821077
- Wheeler, Richard and Dick Estell. Witness to Appomattox (audiobook). Blackstone Audio Inc., 2005. OCLC 144560296
- The Bloody Battle for Suribachi: The amazing story of Iwo Jima that inspired Flags of Our Fathers. New York, New York: Skyhorse, 2007. OCLC 798563531

== Later years ==
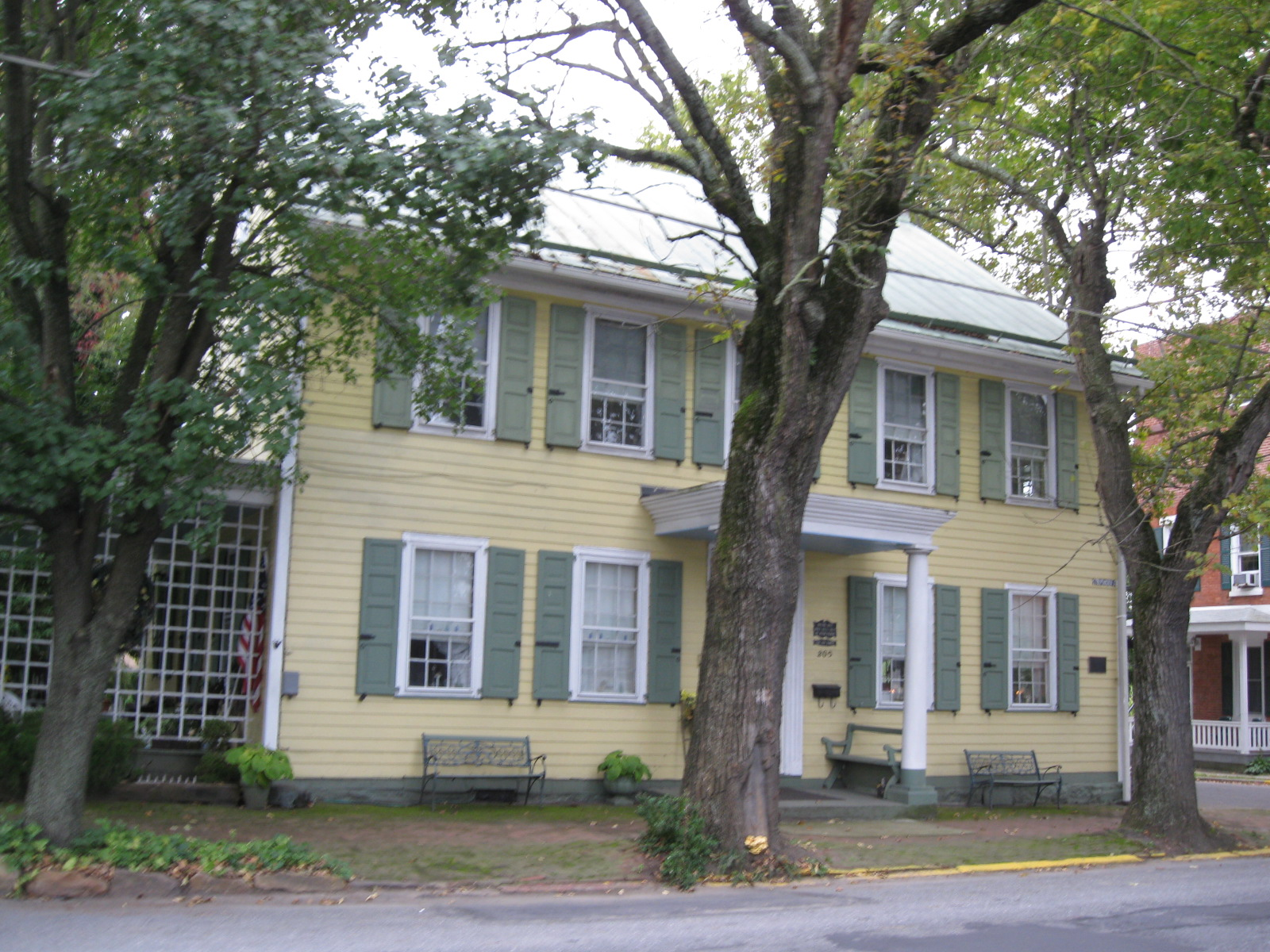
Nutting Hall, Pine Grove, Pennsylvania, c. 2009

In 1997, Wheeler relocated to Pine Grove, Pennsylvania, where he resided at Nutting Hall, the historic home owned by his sister, Marjery Wheeler Mattox. He continued to research and write military history books, and also continued to serve as a consultant for television and film productions.

In 2006, he joined several survivors from his Iwo Jima platoon in attending a Veterans Day breakfast at the White House with President George W. Bush.

== Death and interment ==
Still residing with his sister at Nutting Hall in 2008, he died there at the age of 86 on October 21, 2008, and was interred at Saint Peter's Cemetery in Pine Grove.

== See also ==
- Nutting Hall (Pine Grove, Pennsylvania)
