= John Immel House =

Demolished Historic 19th Century Limestone Farm House in Pennsylvania, U.S.

- Formerly listed on the U.S. National Register of Historic Places
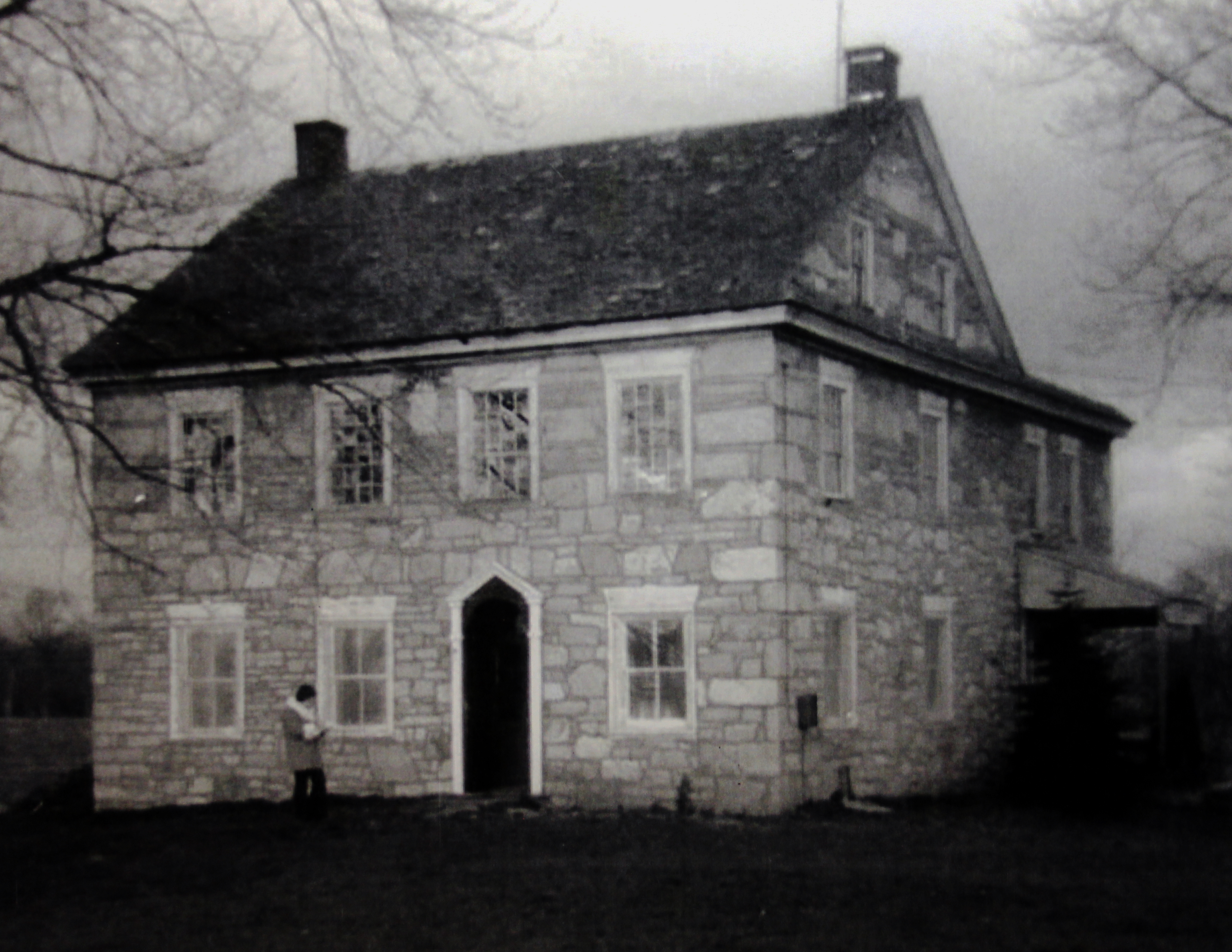
- John Immel House - southeast view - featured exquisite limestone masonry work (as it appeared in 1978).

- Location within Pennsylvania Location within the United States
- Location: East of Myerstown on Flanagan Road, Jackson Township, Pennsylvania
- Coordinates: 40°22′8″N 76°16′21″W
- Area: 2.7 acres (1.1 ha)
- Built: 1814
- Built by: Immel, John
- Demolished: ca. 1990
- NRHP reference No.: 80003548

Significant dates
- Added to NRHP: April 17, 1980
- Removed from NRHP: December 16, 2022

The John Immel House was an historic farmhouse that was located in Jackson Township, Lebanon County, Pennsylvania.

== History and architectural features ==
Built in 1814, in the Pennsylvania German Traditional architecture style, using locally quarried limestone, this historic structure featured master masonry work. It was strategically located near the Union Canal towpath to take advantage of quick access to the fastest transportation system in the southeastern Pennsylvania area during the early nineteenth century.

== Immel family ==
The Immel family are descendants of original German Palatine immigrants. The Immel family was influential in the southeastern Pennsylvania area in the early nineteenth-century as they were involved in religious activities, civic functions and business transactions.

== Pennsylvania German Traditional Architecture ==
The John Immel House was a 2 1/2-story, L-shaped farmhouse, four bays wide and four bays deep. Its main section measured thirty-two feet by thirty-two feet, and included a rear extension that measured eighteen feet by eighteen feet. The front facade featured a classically designed main entranceway with a full pediment and an unusual fan-shaped top transom. The structure included a full basement under both sections, and had a one-room attic above the main section.

The house's most noticeable feature was its excellent early nineteenth-century master masonry workmanship. Examples of this workmanship included non-uniformly shaped limestone building blocks intricately fitted together and large limestone quoins.

It was a near picture-perfect example of Pennsylvania German Traditional architecture because it contained most of the identifiable features of the style including a steep pitched main gable roof, thick stone outer wall construction, four over four front bay façade design, dual gable end brick chimneys, and stood 2 1/2 stories high

== National Register of Historic Places ==
The John Immel House was added to the National Register of Historic Places on April 17, 1980, for its architectural significance as an early nineteenth-century Pennsylvania German Traditional farmhouse. It was delisted in 2022.

== Demolition ==
The John Immel House caught fire circa 1990, and suffered damage that was beyond economic repair. It was demolished soon afterwards. A contributing wooden shed that was located next to it was also demolished around the same time.
