= Pine Grove Historic District (Pine Grove, Pennsylvania) =

Historic district in Pennsylvania, United States

- U.S. National Register of Historic Places
- U.S. Historic district
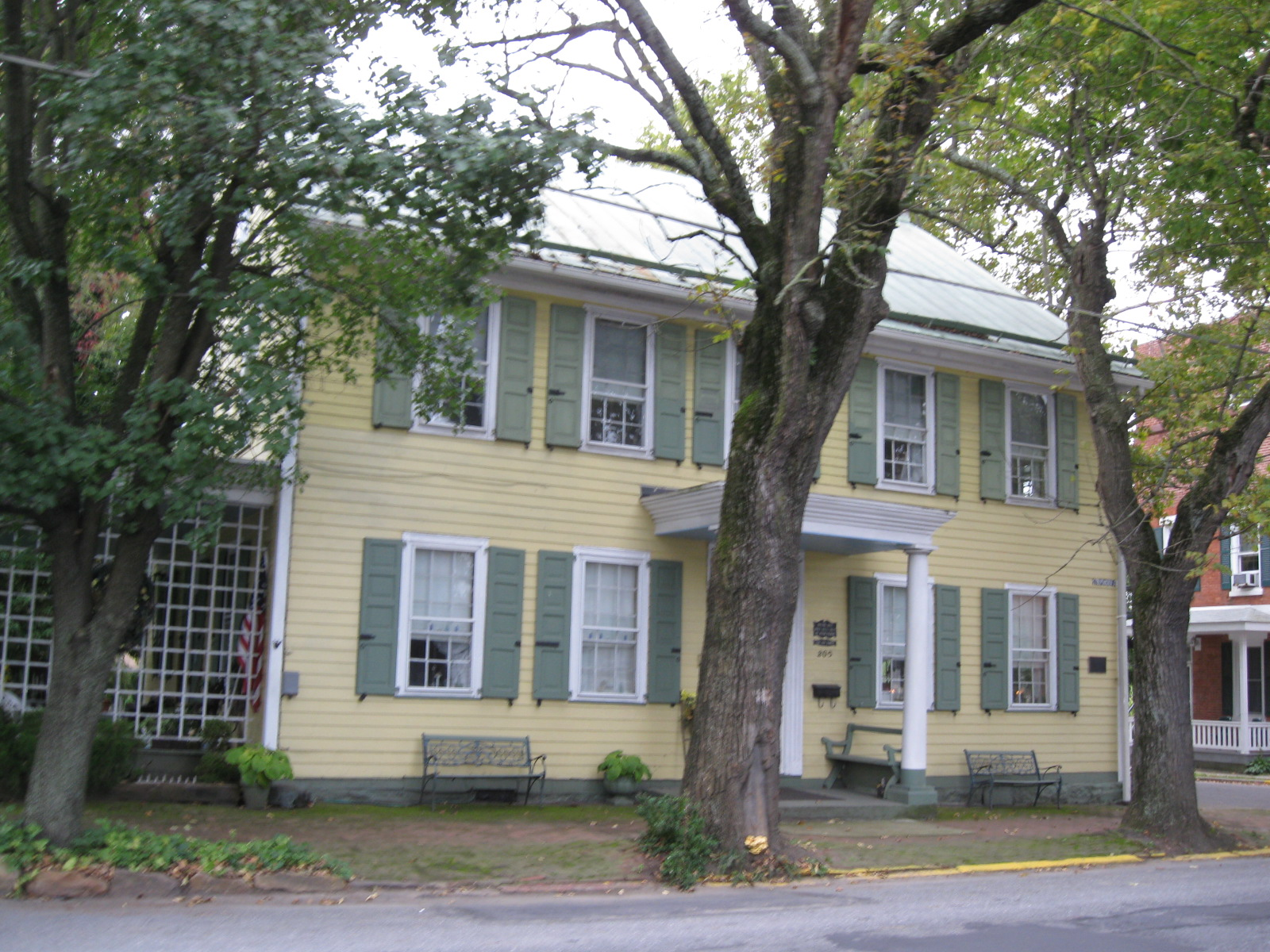
- Nutting Hall, Pine Grove, Pennsylvania

- Location within Pennsylvania Location within the United States
- Location: S. Tulpehocken & Mill Sts., & Swatara Creek, Pine Grove, Pennsylvania
- Coordinates: 40°32′47″N 76°23′04″W
- Area: 177 acres (72 ha)
- Architect: Multiple
- Architectural style: Bungalow/craftsman, Late Victorian, Federal
- NRHP reference No.: 87002210
- Added to NRHP: December 31, 1987

The Pine Grove Historic District is a national historic district located in Pine Grove, Schuylkill County, Pennsylvania. Added to the National Register of Historic Places in 1987, it encompasses 1,770 acres, 233 contributing buildings, one contributing site, and one contributing structure in a residential section of Pine Grove, and is bordered by South Tulpehocken and Mill streets and the Swatara Creek.

== History ==
The Pine Grove Historic District encompasses 1,770 acres, 233 contributing buildings, one contributing site, and one contributing structure in a residential area within the Borough of Pine Grove in Schuylkill County, Pennsylvania, and is bordered by South Tulpehocken and Mill streets and the Swatara Creek.

The completion of the National Register of Historic Places Registration Sheet was done by Gabrielle Ramsauer, a planner with the Economic Development Council of Northeastern Pennsylvania, and William Sisson of the Pennsylvania Historical and Museum Commission, and submitted to the National Park Service of the United States Department of the Interior in 1987 in preparation for the district's listing on the National Register of Historic Places. This district was then officially added to the National Register of later that same year.

== Notable buildings and other structures ==
The majority of contributing buildings that are included in this district are 2- to 2 1/2-story frame residences (single family and duplex) which were primarily constructed in Craftsman/Bungalow, Federal, Queen Anne, or Second Empire architectural styles, and which date to the 19th and early-20th century. Other historic structures were built in Beaux-Arts, Eastlake, Georgian, Gothic Revival, Italianate, or Tudor Revival styles. Most of this historic district's structures were erected between 1850 and 1937; the oldest dwelling was built circa 1750. Additional features of the vernacular buildings include gable roofs with chimneys, weatherboard siding, double hung windows, paneled doors with plain wooden frames, and shed roof front porches supported by simple rounded or squared columns. Most of these homes are also two to five bays wide.

A 1 1/2-story Bungalow-style home, which was erected during the 1920s and is located at 286 South Tulpehocken Street, features a small wooden dormer and a porch with square posts and wooden balustrade.

Nutting Hall, a 2 1/2-story wood-frame home located at 205 South Tulpehocken Street, was designed in the Federal style, and built between 1823 and 1825. Five bays wide, it features a standing seam metal-covered gable roof, six over six windows with paneled shutters, and an entry portico flanked by two columns.

Another Federal-style home is the 1830s-era Barto residence at 159 South Tulpehocken Street. A 2 1/2-story brick structure which is three bays wide with a gable roof, it is distinguished by its two round-headed dormers, windows with period shutters, and front entrance with entablature and pilasters.

The Miller mansion, which was built circa 1870 and is located at 191 South Tulpehocken Street, is one of several Second Empire-style, three-story homes that were designed with mansard roofs, round-headed dormers, and cornices with carved brackets. A brick structure, its most distinguishing features are its elaborately decorated front porch and balcony with openwork panels and turned posts.

Highspire, the brick, three-story, three-bay-wide, Queen Anne home which was built in 1900, is one of the more prominent structures in this district. Located at 177 South Tulpehocken Street, it features a period door with transom, Queen Anne-style decorative glass windows, a large, column-flanked, side porch with decorative balustrade, and a three-story tower topped by a pointed slate roof and cast iron finial.

Also included in the district are seven commercial buildings, four churches, and a school. The sole factory located in this historic district, the Summit Station Manufacturing Company, a two-story, wood-frame vernacular, is located at 194-196 South Tulpehocken Street. Located nearby at 213 South Tulpehocken, the brick, 2 1/2-story Pine Theater was designed in the Beaux-Arts style. The brick, two-story, Federal-style structure, which stands at 209 South Tulpehocken, served as office space for a coal company before being converted into apartments. Redesigned for use as a bakery, its function was subsequently changed to that of a Masonic Hall.

Saint Peter's Evangelical Lutheran Church, which had its beginnings in another church that had been erected across the street from the present-day stone structure located at 312 South Tulpehocken Street, was established by Jacob Gunkle in 1782. The foundation for the "new" stone church at 312 S. Tulpehocken was then laid in the spring of 1816. Topped by a shingle roof, it featured a tall, white pulpit, which was accessible by a flight of steep, winding stairs. In 1851, the church's congregation added a bell tower; the bell, which was tuned to B-flat, was produced by the Meneeby Bell Foundry in Troy, New York. It lasted 60 years. The church building was then remodeled between 1870 and 1872 to add a basement, replace the existing pulpit and gallery, replace existing windows while enclosing others in stone, raise the ceiling, add two new stairways, and improve the bell tower. A reed organ was added in 1901. The church was then remodeled again between 1914 and 1915 to add a stone chancel at the building's south end, remove the gallery, install new art glass windows, Fresco the walls of the church auditorium, replace the altar, pews, pulpit and lectern, add new carpeting, install a new steam heating system, and erect a new stone bell tower above the building's northeast corner. The existing bell was replaced with a duplicate B-flat-toned bell from the same manufacturer, the Meneeby Bell Foundry, and the church was rededicated on November 21, 1915. The bell tower was then shored up with steel girders in 1926; church leaders also added a new hardwood floor in the Sunday school room that same year, enlarged the primary room, and upgraded the heating system. A decade later, the reed organ was replaced with a pipe organ. Sidewalks, curbs and a stone wall were added to the property's grounds in 1941. The church was then expanded again, beginning with the construction of a one-story addition to the rear of the church in 1955, which extended the building 40 feet on the north side. The sanctuary was then renovated, the pipe organ was rebuilt, and new Sunday school rooms were also added before the existing bell tower was replaced with a new stone bell tower, and the existing parsonage was relocated to the upper lot behind the church. Additional improvements have continued to be made since that time.

The Pine Grove Armory, which is located at 143 South Tulpehocken Street, is a 10,182-square-foot brick, castellated, Gothic Revival structure which was built circa 1908. It was once home to the 228th Brigade Support Battalion's D Company. In 2015, newspapers reported that the Borough of Pine Grove purchased the former armory building.

In addition, the eastern side of this historic district is home to a former Union Canal basin while the southern section of South Tulpehocken Street borders a small cemetery.

== Gallery ==
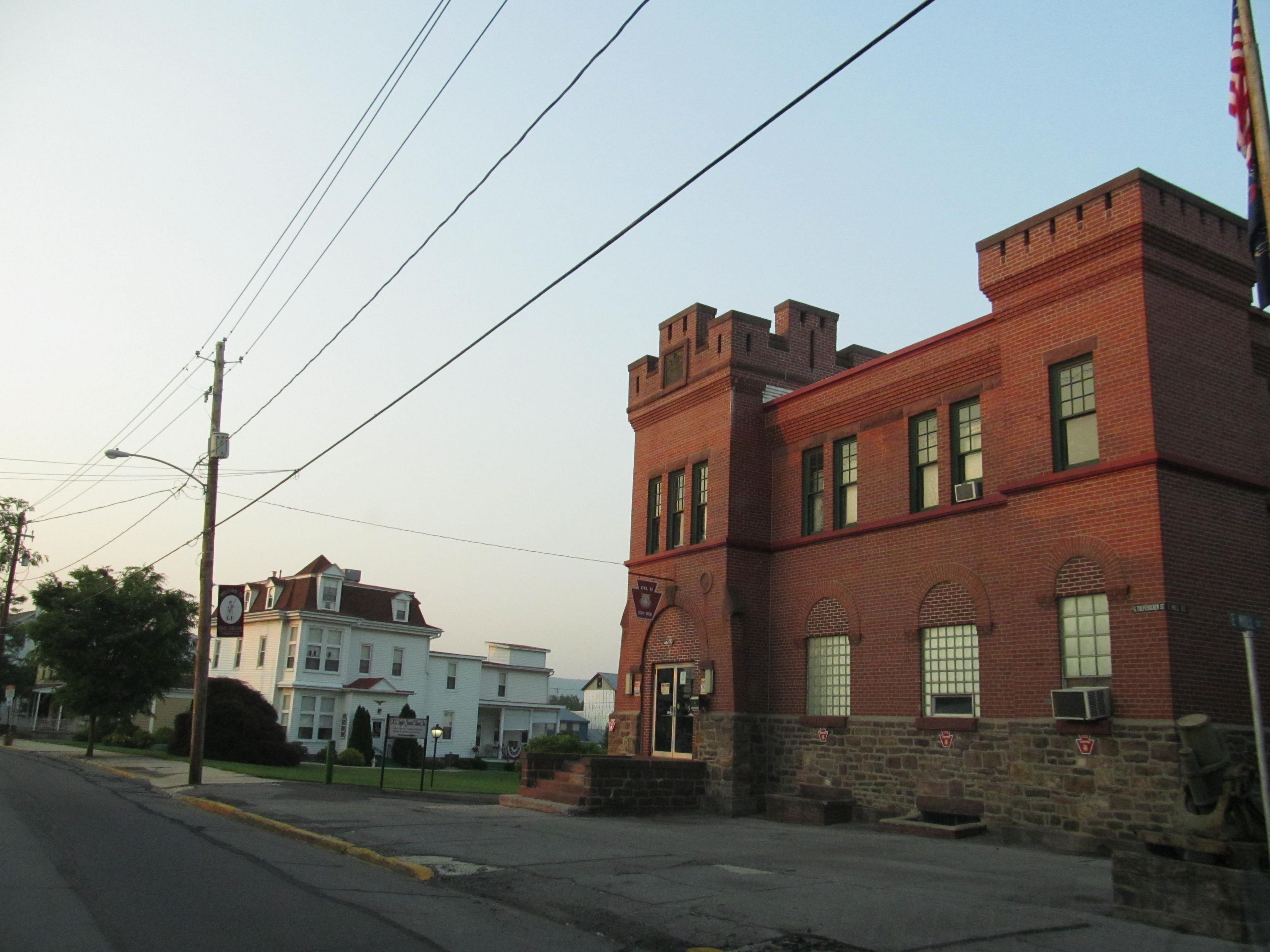
Pine Grove Armory, 143 S. Tulpehocken (Armory: brick building, right; H.L. Snyder Funeral Home: white building, left)

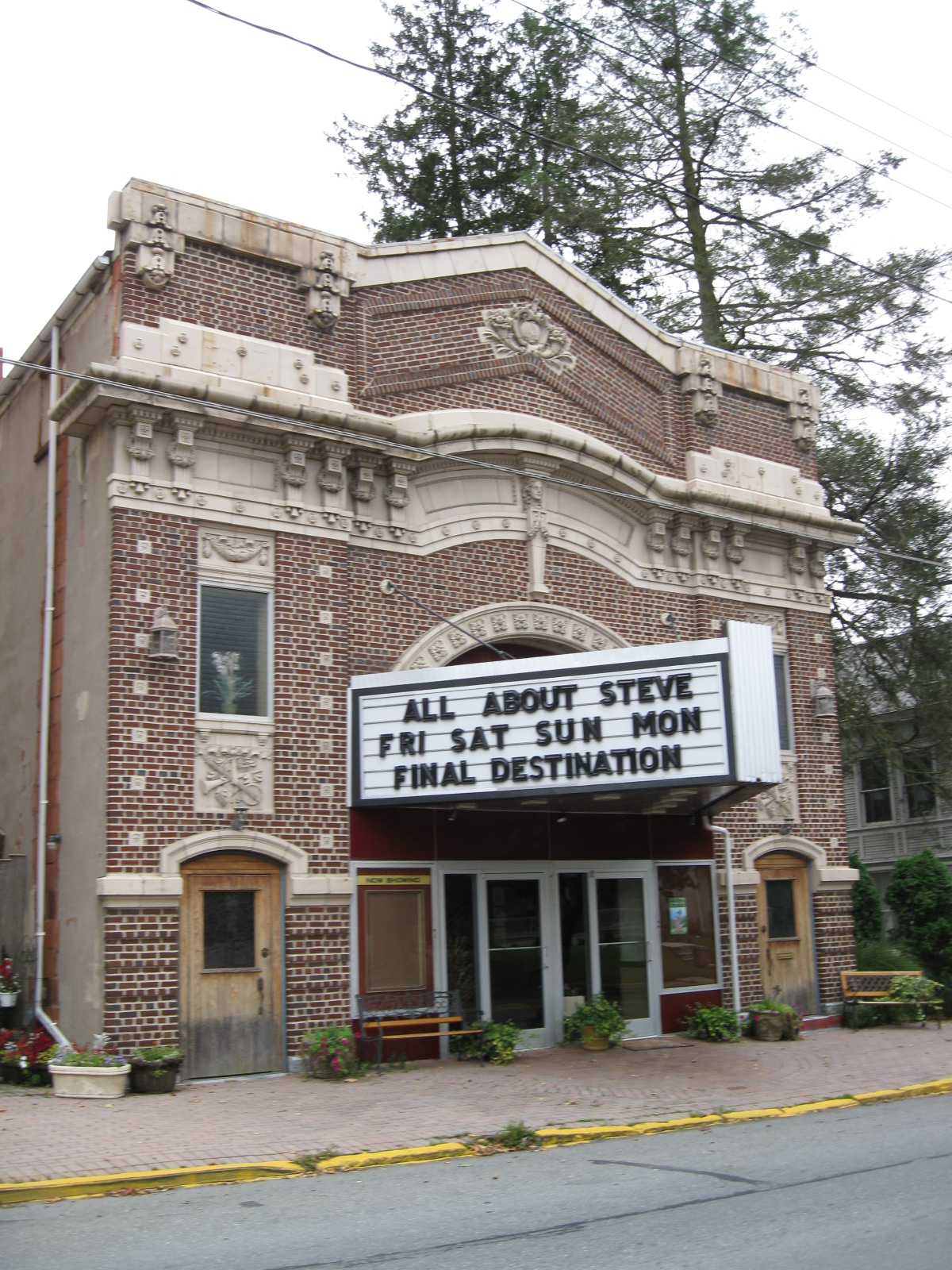
Pine Theater, 213 S. Tulpehocken

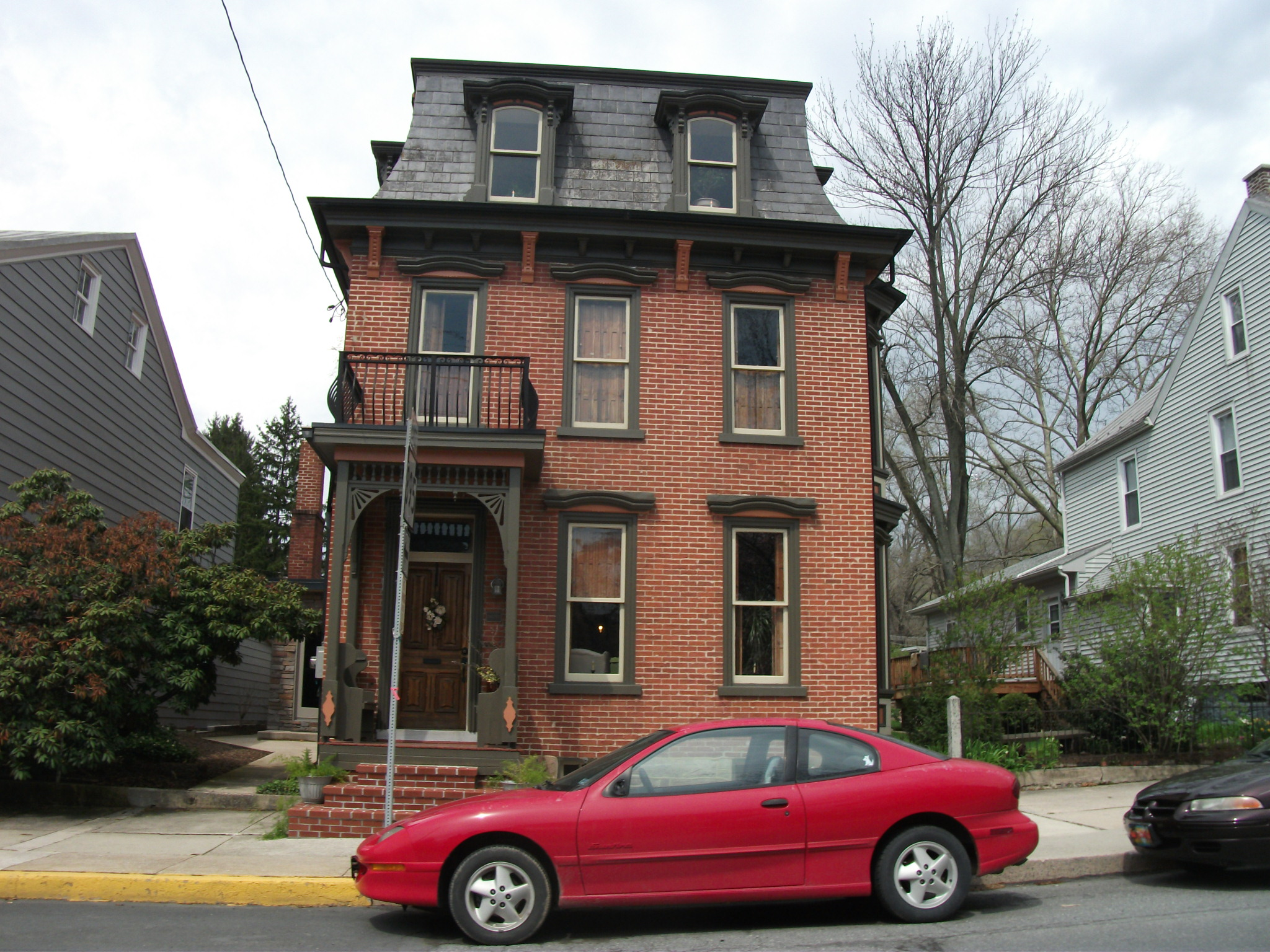
Residence, 240 S. Tulpehocken

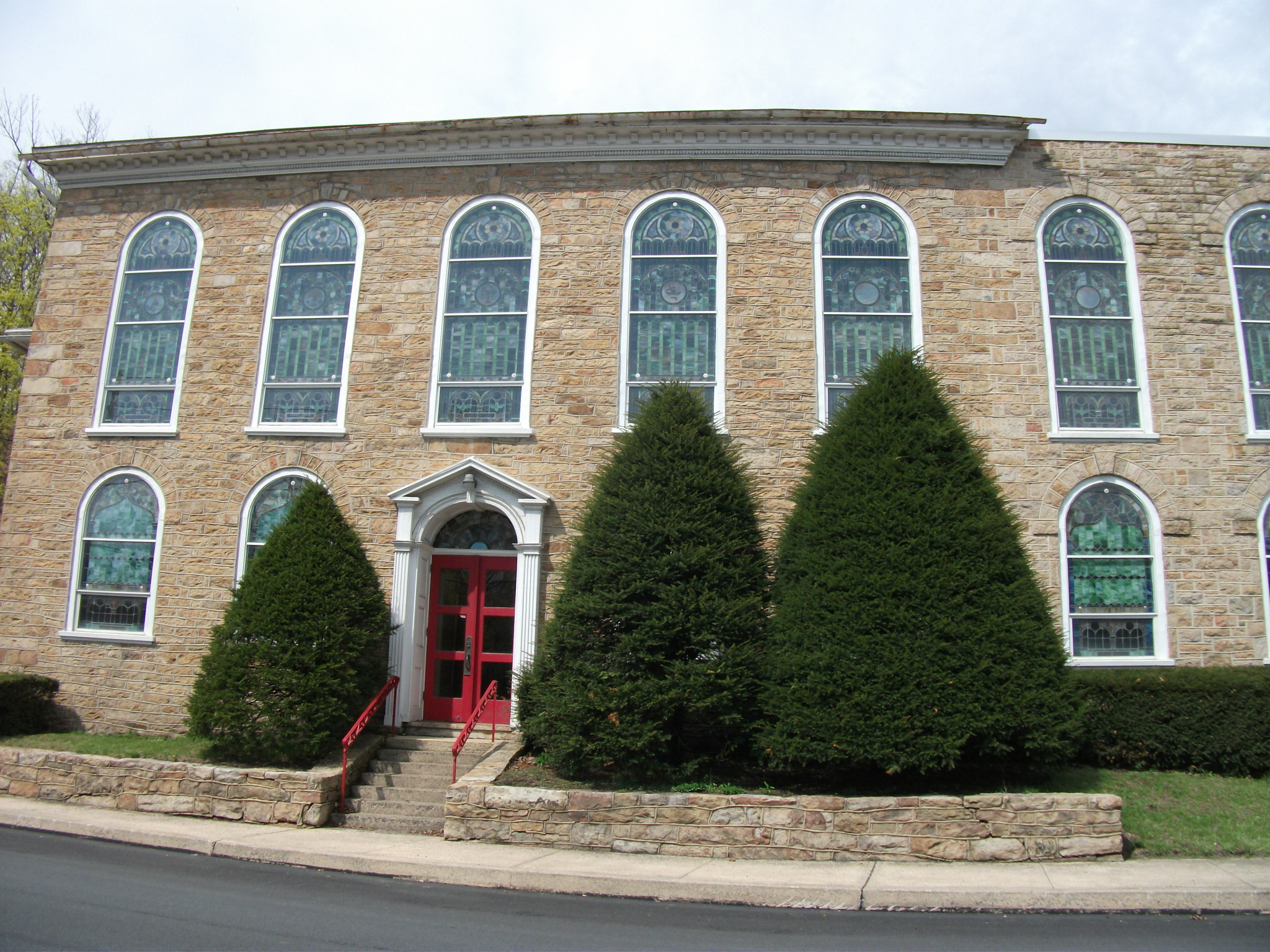
St. Peter's Evangelical Lutheran Church, 312 S. Tulpehocken
- Media related to Category:Pine Grove, Schuylkill County, Pennsylvania at Wikimedia Commons
