= Pine Grove, Schuylkill County, Pennsylvania =

Borough in Pennsylvania, US

Pine Grove, Pennsylvania
- Borough
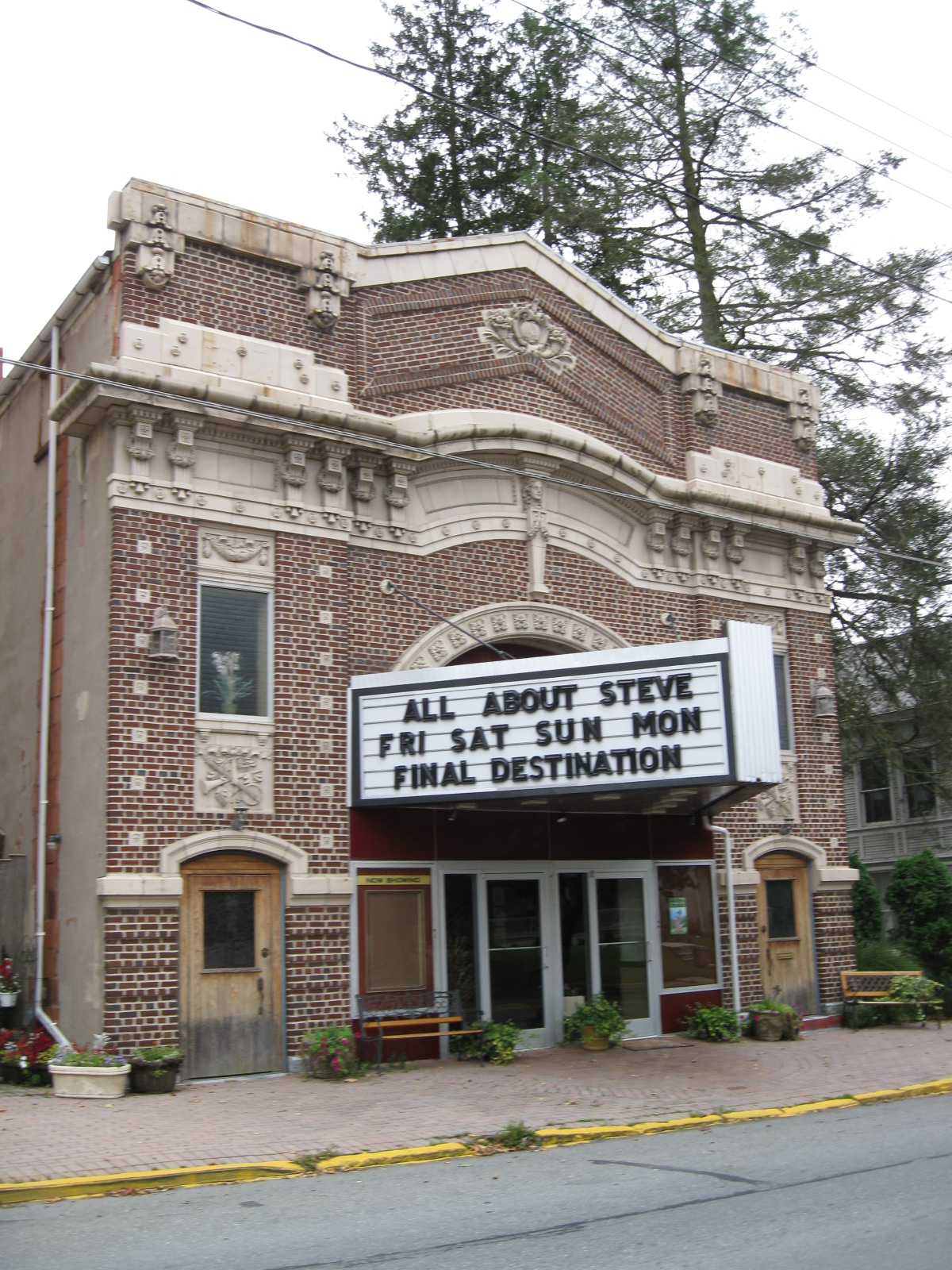
- Pine Grove Theatre, which opened in Pine Grove in 1910 and closed in 2019

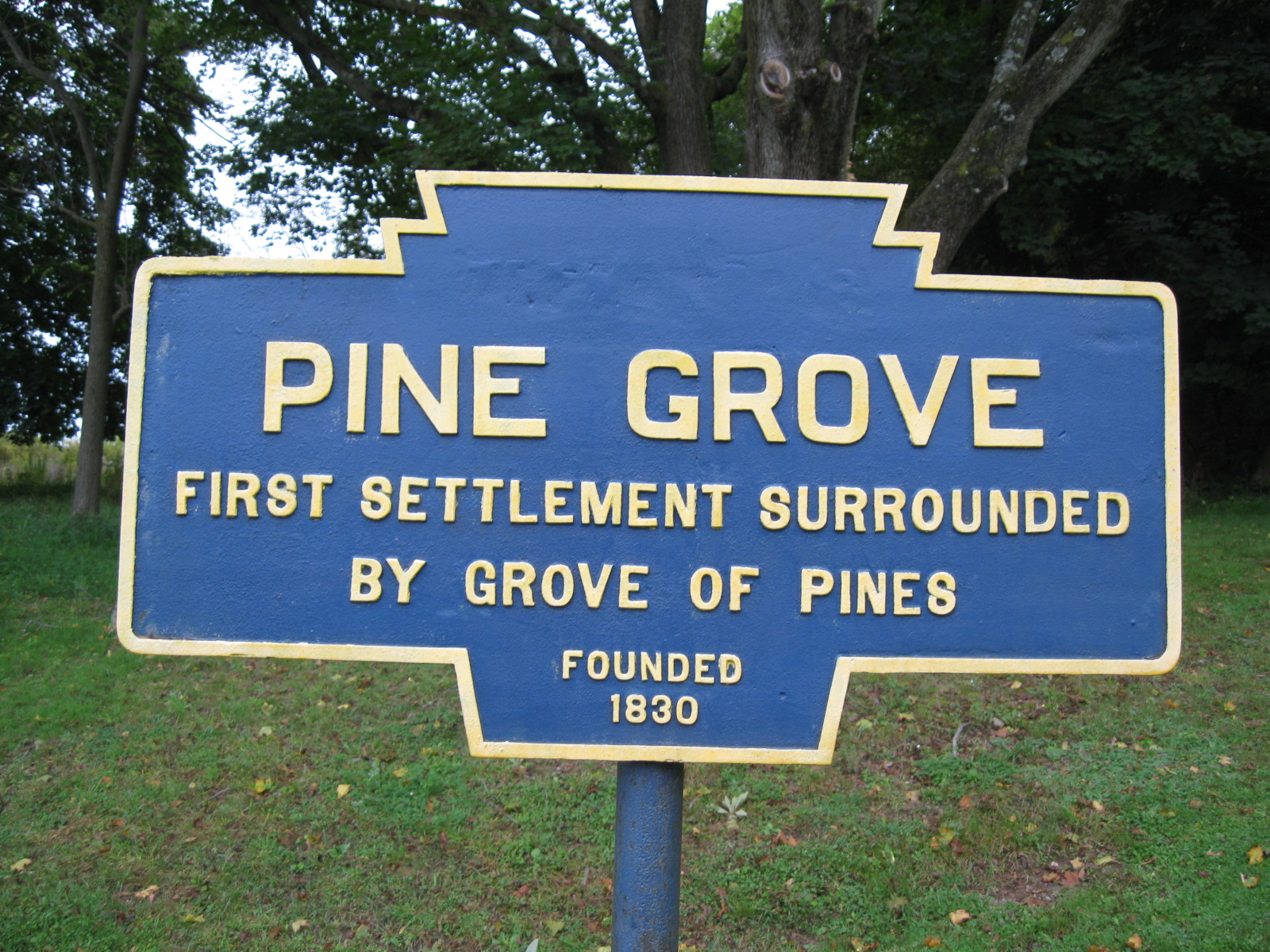
- Keystone marker

- Location of Pine Grove in Schuylkill County, Pennsylvania

- Location of Pine Grove in Pennsylvania Pine Grove (the United States)
- Coordinates: 40°33′04″N 76°23′06″W
- Country: United States
- State: Pennsylvania
- County: Schuylkill
- Settled: 1830
- Incorporated: 1832

Government
  - Type: Borough Council
  - Mayor: Willard Shiffer

Area
  - Total: 1.07 sq mi (2.76 km^{2})
  - Land: 1.07 sq mi (2.76 km^{2})
  - Water: 0 sq mi (0.00 km^{2})

Population (2020)
  - Total: 2,049
  - Density: 1,925/sq mi (743.1/km^{2})
- Time zone: UTC-5 (Eastern (EST))
  - Summer (DST): UTC-4 (EDT)
- ZIP code: 17963
- Area code: 570
- FIPS code: 42-60456
- GNIS feature ID: 1215563

Pine Grove is a borough in Schuylkill County, Pennsylvania, United States. As of the 2020 census, the borough population was 2,054.

Pine Grove Area School District, serving students from three municipalities and multiple surrounding townships, is located in the borough.

== History ==
Pine Grove was officially incorporated in 1832.

European settlement of the area by German Palatines, however, pre-dates this official founding date by at least several decades. Historical records document the Jacob Gunkle building was Lutheran church in the area as early as 1782.

The historic Nutting Hall was built between 1823 and 1825. Both Nutting Hall and the surrounding Pine Grove Historic District are listed on the National Register of Historic Places.

The 335-seat Pine Grove Theatre, which is also part of the Pine Grove Historic District, opened in 1910 and is still up and running {2021}.

== Geography ==
Swatara Creek, a tributary of the Susquehanna River, runs through Pine Grove.

A 22-mile (35 km) feeder branch of the Union Canal connected the Swatara Creek at Pine Grove to Union Water Works between 1830 (or 1832) and 1862, until its destruction when the Swatara flooded in June 1862. The branch canal was used to ship anthracite and supply water to the Water Works. Parts of Swatara State Park are located along the Swatara Creek within Pine Grove.

== Demographics ==
Historical population
Census	Pop.	Note	%±
1850	646		—
1870	845		—
1880	957		13.3%
1890	1,103		15.3%
1900	1,084		−1.7%
1910	1,352		24.7%
1920	1,778		31.5%
1930	2,257		26.9%
1940	2,239		−0.8%
1950	2,237		−0.1%
1960	2,267		1.3%
1970	2,197		−3.1%
1980	2,244		2.1%
1990	2,118		−5.6%
2000	2,154		1.7%
2010	2,186		1.5%
2020	2,054		−6.0%
2021 (est.)	2,057		0.1%

At the 2000 census, there were 2,154 people,877 households, and 558 families residing in the borough. The population density was 1,997.0 inhabitants per square mile (771.0/km^{2}). There were 937 housing units at an average density of 868.7 per square mile (335.4/km^{2}). The racial makeup of the borough was 98.75% White, 0.14% African American, 0.00% Native American, 0.51% Asian, 0.00% Pacific Islander, 0.09% from other races, and 0.51% from two or more races. 0.05% of the population were Hispanic or Latino of any race.

Of the 877 households, 27.6% had children under the age of 18 living with them, 50.4% were married couples living together, 9.7% had a female householder with no husband present, and 36.3% were non-families. 30.9% of households were one person, and 17.7% were one person aged 65 or older. The average household size was 2.36 and the average family size was 2.98.

In Pine Grove, the population was spread out, with 21.9% under the age of 18, 7.9% from 18 to 24, 28.6% from 25 to 44, 22.6% from 45 to 64, and 19.1% 65 or older. The median age was 39 years. For every 100 females, there were 89.3 males. For every 100 females age 18 and over, there were 87.4 males.

The median household income was $35,865 and the median family income was $49,737. Males had a median income of $31,369 versus $21,818 for females. The per capita income for the borough was $19,547. 5.9% of the population and 2.6% of families were below the poverty line. Out of the total people living in poverty, 2.9% are under the age of 18 and 5.6% are 65 or older.

== Education ==
The school district is Pine Grove Area School District.

== Notable people ==
- Susan Manbeck Corbett, wife of former Pennsylvania governor Tom Corbett and first lady of Pennsylvania
- David Horst, professional soccer player, Real Salt Lake of Major League Soccer
- Conrad Richter, novelist
- Richard "Dick" Wheeler, author and historian
