= Jackson Township, Lebanon County, Pennsylvania =

Township in Pennsylvania, US

Coordinates: 40°22′00″N 76°17′59″W

- Township
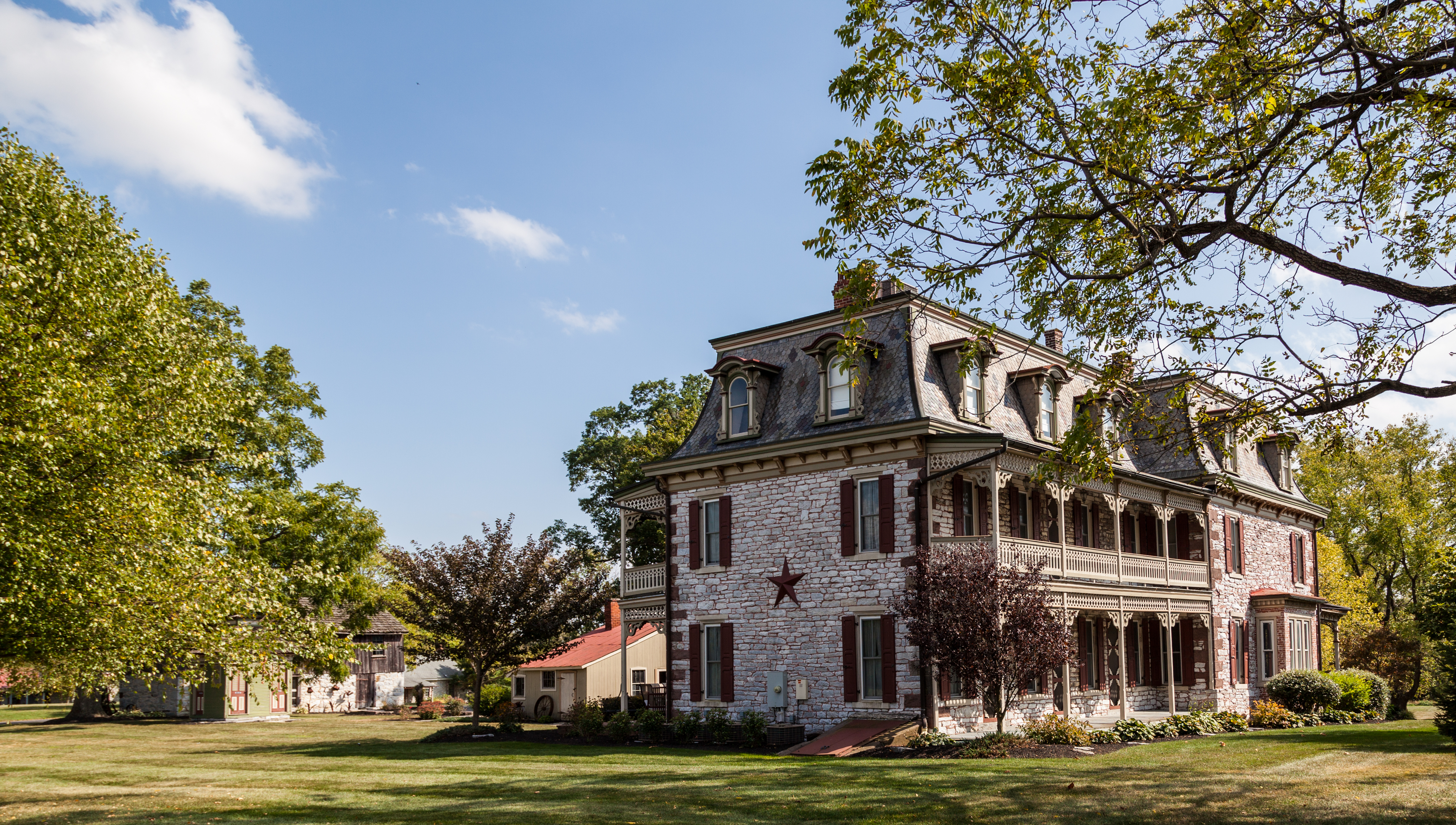
- The Tulpehocken Manor Plantation, a historic site in the township

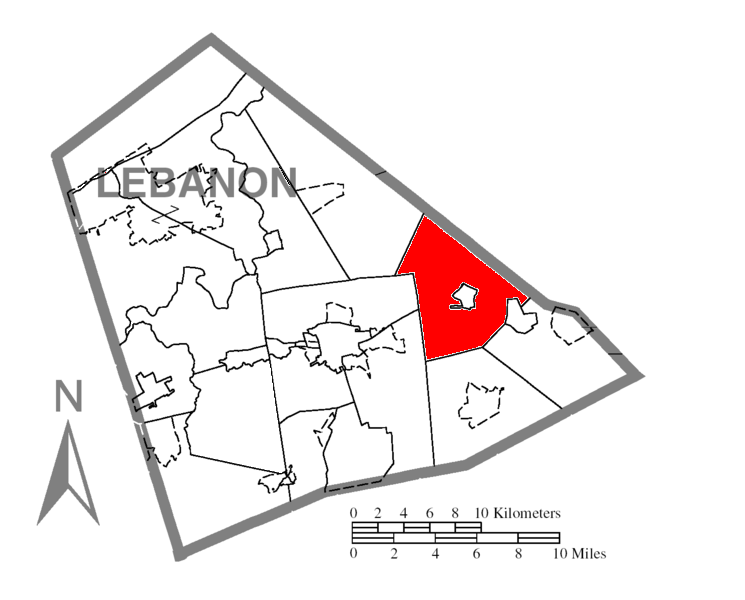
- Location in Lebanon County, Pennsylvania

- Map of Lebanon County, Pennsylvania
- Country: United States
- State: Pennsylvania
- County: Lebanon
- Settled: 1700
- Incorporated: 1813

Area
  - Total: 24.14 sq mi (62.51 km^{2})
  - Land: 24.05 sq mi (62.30 km^{2})
  - Water: 0.077 sq mi (0.20 km^{2})

Population (2020)
  - Total: 9,352 ▲
  - Estimate (2021): 9,336
  - Density: 365.8/sq mi (141.23/km^{2})
- Time zone: UTC-5 (Eastern (EST))
  - Summer (DST): UTC-4 (EDT)
- Area code: 717
- FIPS code: 42-075-37392
- Website: jacksontownship-pa.gov

Historical population
Census	Pop.	Note	%±
2000	6,338		—
2010	8,163		28.8%
2020	9,352		14.6%
2021 (est.)	9,336		−0.2%
U.S. Decennial Census

Jackson Township is a township that is located in Lebanon County, Pennsylvania, United States. The population was 9,352 at the time of the 2020 census.

== History ==
The John Immel House and Tulpehocken Manor Plantation are listed on the National Register of Historic Places.

== Geography ==
According to the United States Census Bureau, the township has a total area of 23.9 square miles (62 km^{2}), of which 23.8 square miles (62 km^{2}) is land and 0.1 square miles (0.26 km^{2}) (0.54%) is water.

== Demographics ==
As of the census of 2000, there were 6,338 people, 2,397 households, and 1,824 families residing in the township.

The population density was 266.4 inhabitants per square mile (102.9/km^{2}). There were 2,478 housing units at an average density of 104.1 per square mile (40.2/km^{2}).

The racial makeup of the township was 98.60% White, 0.28% African American, 0.09% Native American, 0.36% Asian, 0.02% Pacific Islander, 0.30% from other races, and 0.35% from two or more races. Hispanic or Latino of any race were 0.76% of the population.

There were 2,397 households, out of which 28.8% had children under the age of 18eighteen living with them; 67.6% were married couples living together, 5.7% had a female householder with no husband present, and 23.9% were non-families. 20.9% of all households were made up of individuals, and 12.5% had someone living alone who was sixty-five years of age or older.

The average household size was 2.60 and the average family size was 3.03.

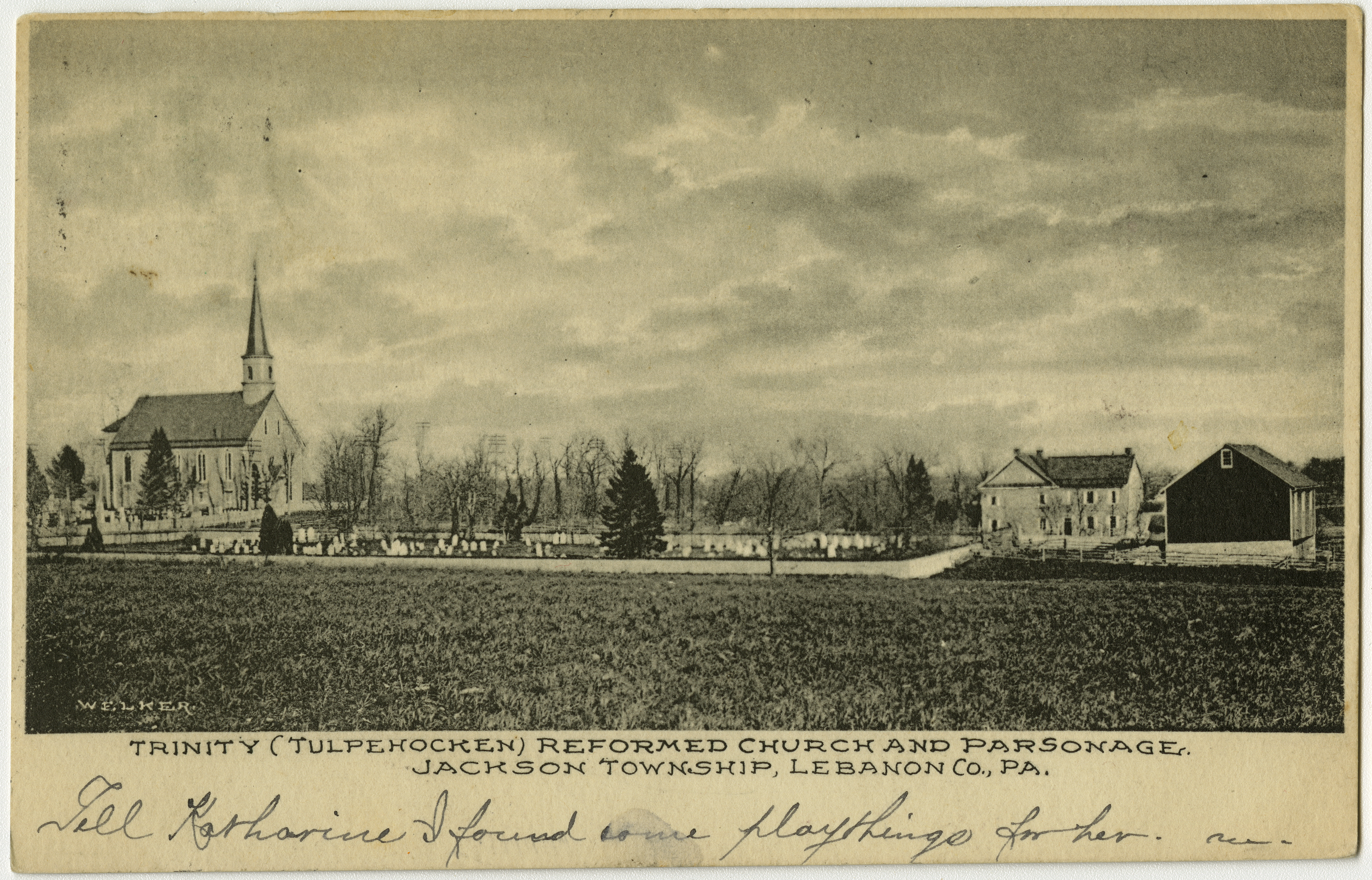
Tulpehocken Trinity Church on an old postcard

Within the township, the population was spread out, with 23.9% under the age of eighteen, 7.6% from eighteen to twenty-four, 23.7% from twenty-five to y-four, 24.8% from forty-five to sixty-four, and 20.0% who were sixty-five years of age or older. The median age was forty-one years.

For every one hundred females there were 93.3 males. For every one hundred females who were aged eighteen or older, there were 92.0 males.

The median income for a household in the township was $40,469, and the median income for a family was $45,213. Males had a median income of $32,015 compared with that of $22,654 for females.

The per capita income for the township was $18,166.

Approximately 4.6% of families and 6.3% of the population were living below the poverty line, including 10.5% of those who were under the age eighteen and 7.4% of those who were aged sixty-five or older.
