= Walker Township, Schuylkill County, Pennsylvania =

Township in Pennsylvania, US

Coordinates: 40°44′00″N 76°00′59″W

- Township
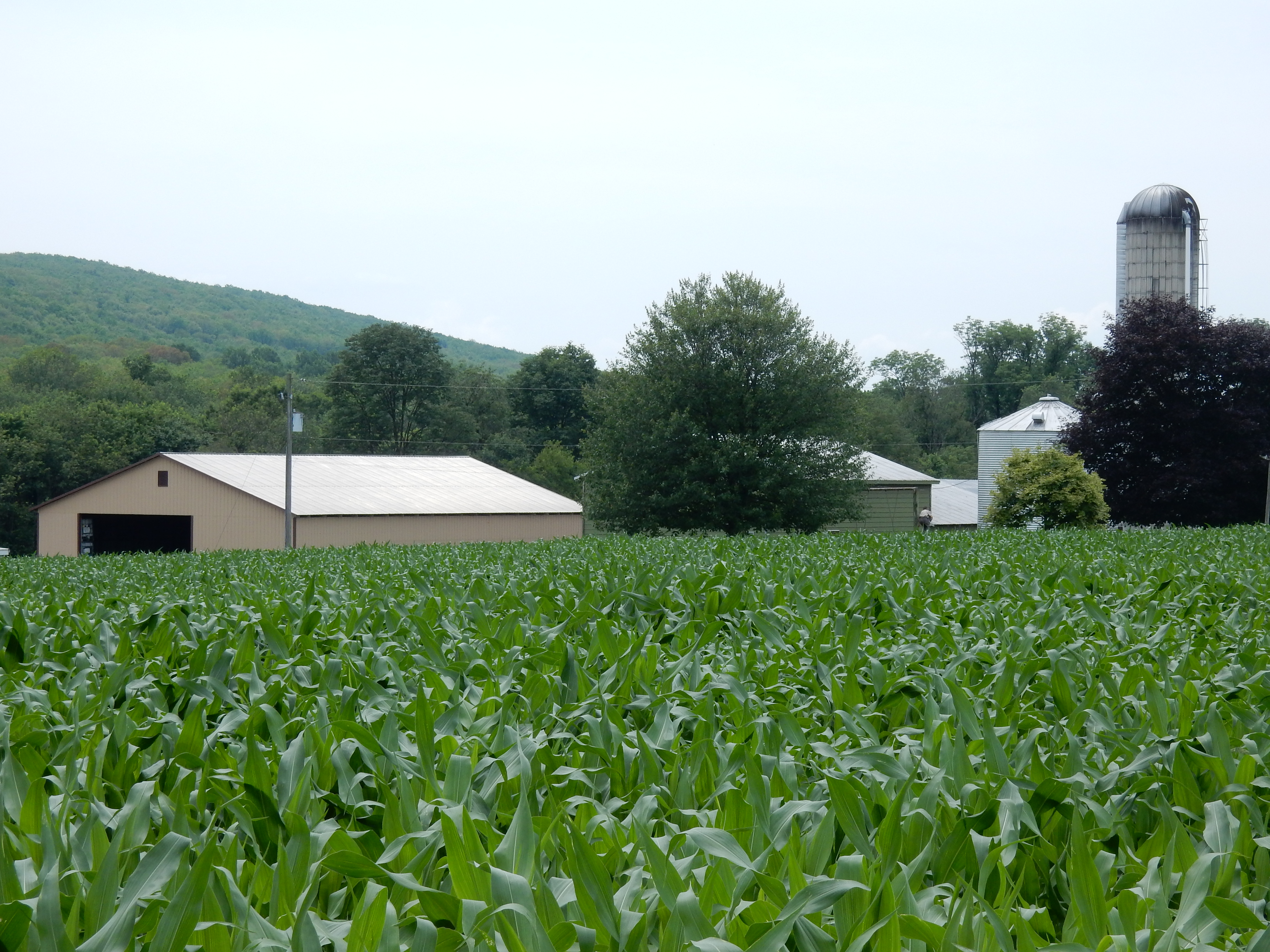
- Farm on Valley Road in Walker Township

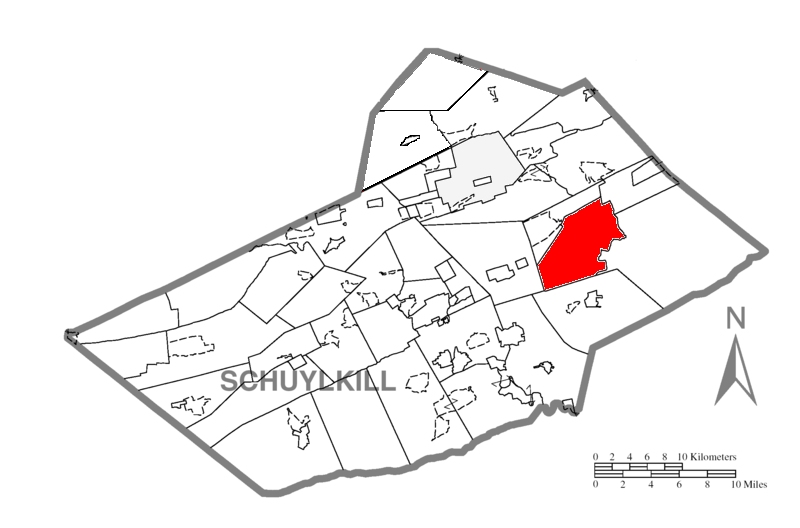
- Map of Schuylkill County, Pennsylvania Highlighting Walker Township

- Map of Schuylkill County, Pennsylvania
- Country: United States
- State: Pennsylvania
- County: Schuylkill
- Settled: 1803
- Incorporated: 1878

Area
  - Total: 22.85 sq mi (59.19 km^{2})
  - Land: 22.81 sq mi (59.08 km^{2})
  - Water: 0.042 sq mi (0.11 km^{2})

Population (2020)
  - Total: 994 ▼
  - Estimate (2021): 999
  - Density: 44.7/sq mi (17.25/km^{2})
- Time zone: UTC-5 (Eastern (EST))
  - Summer (DST): UTC-4 (EDT)
- Area code: 570
- FIPS code: 42-107-80576
- Website: http://www.walkertwp.com/Pages/default.aspx

Walker Township is a township that is located in Schuylkill County, Pennsylvania, United States. The population was 994 at the time of the 2020 census.

== Geography ==
According to the United States Census Bureau, the township has a total area of 22.9 square miles (59.3 km^{2}), of which 22.8 square miles (59.1 km^{2}) is land and 0.1 square mile (0.1 km^{2}) (0.22%) is water.

== Demographics ==
Historical population
Census	Pop.	Note	%±
2010	1,054		—
2020	994		−5.7%
2021 (est.)	999		0.5%
U.S. Decennial Census

At the time of the 2000 census, there were 936 people, 361 households, and 283 families living in the township.

The population density was 41.0 inhabitants per square mile (15.8/km^{2}). There were 383 housing units at an average density of 16.8/sq mi (6.5/km^{2}).

The racial makeup of the township was 99.47% White, 0.21% Asian, and 0.32% from two or more races. Hispanic or Latino of any race were 0.21%.

Of the 361 households documented in this township, 31.3% had children who were under the age of eighteen living with them, 67.6% were married couples living together, 6.6% had a female householder with no husband present, and 21.6% were non-families. 18.6% of households were one person and 11.1% were one person aged sixty-five or older.

The average household size was 2.59 and the average family size was 2.95.

The age distribution was 23.4% of residents who were under the age of 18, 7.6% from 18 to 24, 27.2% from 25 to 44, 24.1% from 45 to 64, and 17.6% 65 or older. The median age was 41 years.

For every 100 females, there were 100.9 males. For every 100 females who were aged eighteen or older, there were 102.0 males.

The median household income was $44,167 and the median family income was $51,146. Males had a median income of $32,981 compared with that of $23,750 for females.

The per capita income for the township was $18,608.

Approximately 7.6% of families and 10.1% of the population were living below the poverty line, including 22.2% of those who were under the age of eighteen and 6.3% of those who were aged sixty-five or older.
