= Myerstown, Pennsylvania =

Borough in Pennsylvania, US

- Borough
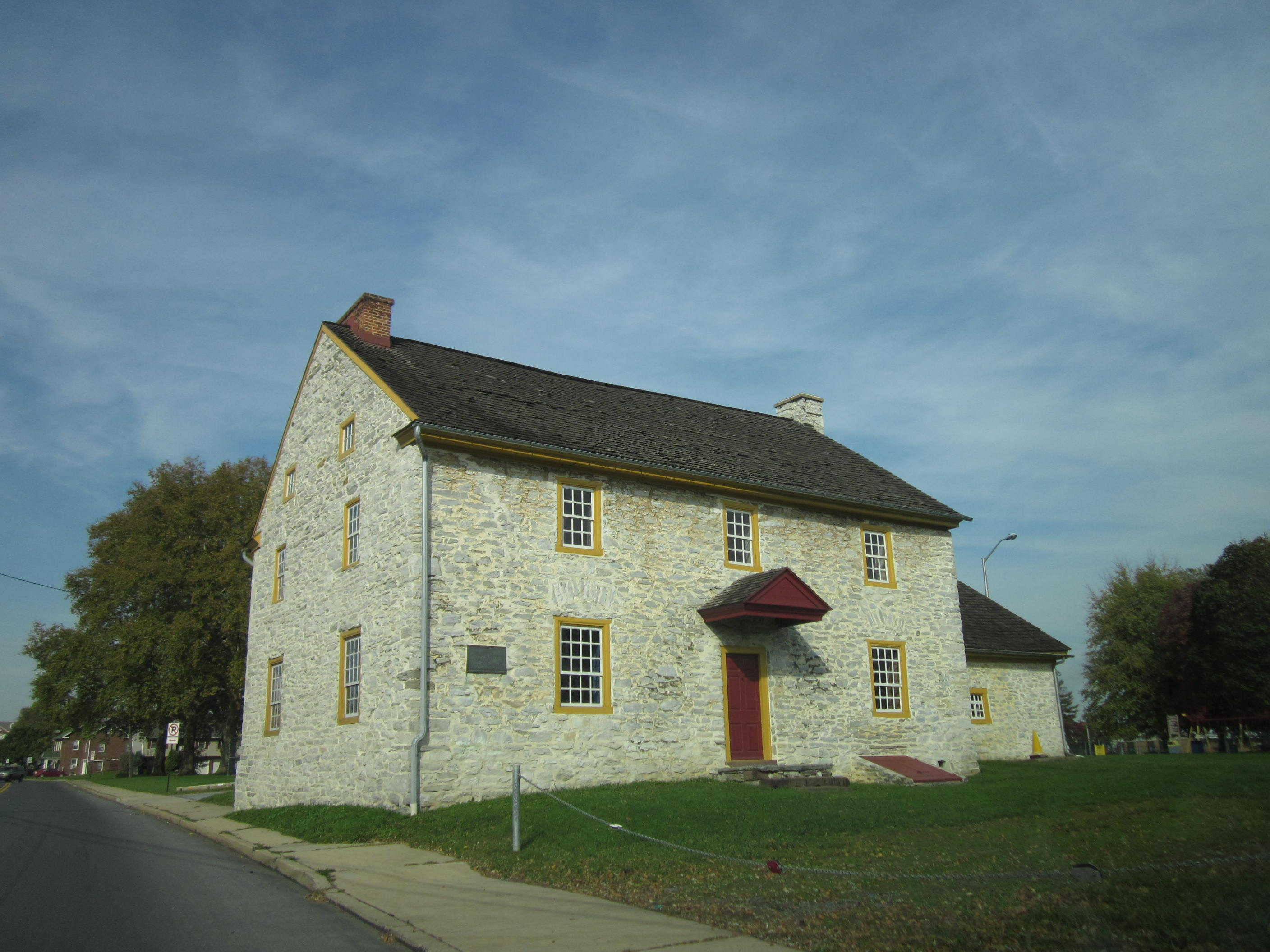
- The historic Isaac Meier home in Myerstown in October, 2011

- Location of Myerstown in Lebanon County, Pennsylvania.

- Location in Pennsylvania Location in the United States
- Coordinates: 40°22′19″N 76°18′15″W
- Country: United States
- State: Pennsylvania
- County: Lebanon
- Settled: 1763
- Incorporated: 1912

Government
  - Type: Borough Council

Area
  - Total: 0.86 sq mi (2.22 km^{2})
  - Land: 0.86 sq mi (2.22 km^{2})
  - Water: 0 sq mi (0.00 km^{2})

Population (2020)
  - Total: 3,094
  - Density: 3,612.6/sq mi (1,394.82/km^{2})
- Time zone: UTC-5 (Eastern (EST))
  - Summer (DST): UTC-4 (EDT)
- ZIP Code: 17067
- Area codes: 717 and 223
- FIPS code: 42-52488
- Website: myerstownpa.org

Myerstown (Pennsylvania Dutch: Moyerschteddel) is a borough located in Lebanon County, Pennsylvania. It is part of the Lebanon, Pennsylvania Metropolitan statistical area. The population was 3,103 at the 2020 census. It is home to over 100 businesses, including a Bayer manufacturing plant, a GAF manufacturing plant, Farmer Boy Ag, Stoneridge Towne Centre and Wengers of Myerstown. The Evangelical Seminary is located on South College Street.

== History ==
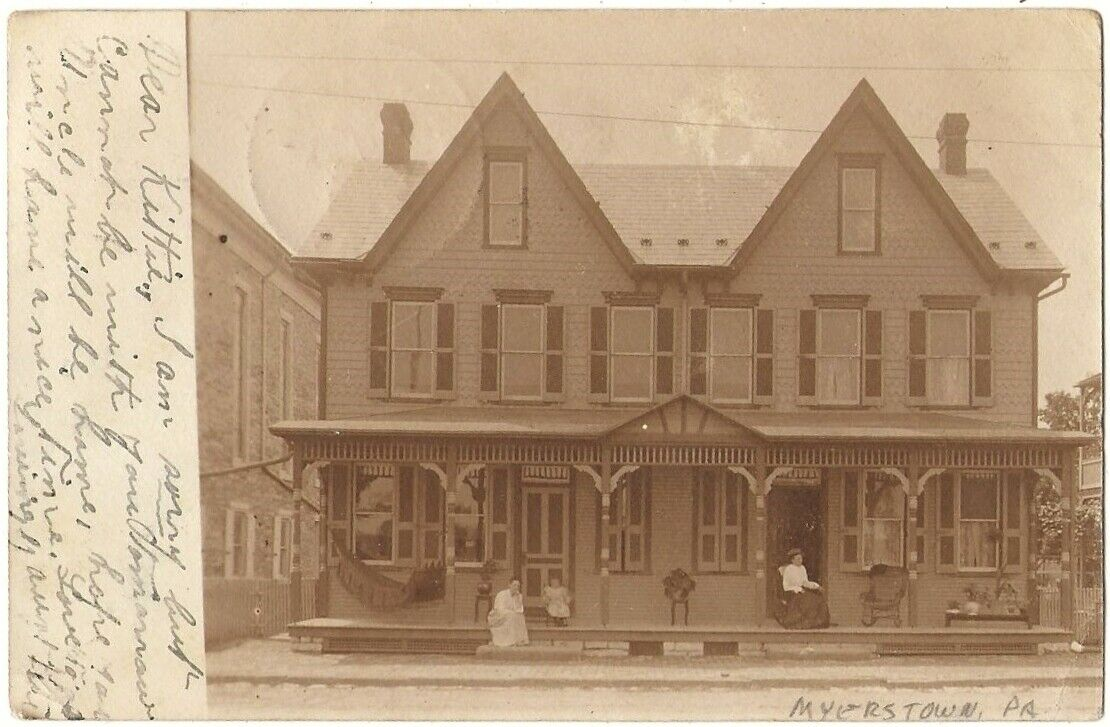
A Myerstown house in a postcard mailed on August 7, 1906

On December 24, 1757, 249 acres (1.01 km^{2}) of land was deeded to Isaac Meier and wife Catherine, who built their house at the Hergelrode site on South College Street. As early as 1763 he began deeding out lots and planned to make a town which he called Tulpehocken Town, after the Tulpehocken Creek, which runs through the borough.

Meier was fatally shot by an unknown assassin on July 14, 1770, at the Henry Buch House on 40 West Main Street which was a tavern at that time. After his death the citizens of Tulpehocken Town began to call it Meier's Town after him.

The Isaac Meier Homestead was added to the National Register of Historic Places in 1973.

== Geography ==
Myerstown is located at 40°22'19" North, 76°18'15" West (40.372058, -76.304208). According to the U.S. Census Bureau, the borough has a total area of 0.9 square miles (2.3 km^{2}), all land.

Myerstown is completely surrounded by Jackson Township. It has a hot-summer humid continental climate (Dfa) and the local hardiness zone is 6b. Average monthly temperatures range from 29.2 °F in January to 74.1 °F in July.

Border detail of Myerstown and surrounding municipality

== Demographics ==
Historical population
Census	Pop.	Note	%±
1880	1,580		—
1890	1,880		19.0%
1920	2,385		—
1930	2,593		8.7%
1940	2,692		3.8%
1950	3,050		13.3%
1960	3,268		7.1%
1970	3,645		11.5%
1980	3,131		−14.1%
1990	3,236		3.4%
2000	3,171		−2.0%
2010	3,062		−3.4%
2020	3,094		1.0%
2021 (est.)	3,107	▲	0.4%

=== 2020 census ===
As of the 2020 census, Myerstown had a population of 3,094. The median age was 39.4 years. 22.6% of residents were under the age of 18 and 20.8% of residents were 65 years of age or older. For every 100 females there were 94.8 males, and for every 100 females age 18 and over there were 87.9 males age 18 and over.

100.0% of residents lived in urban areas, while 0.0% lived in rural areas.

There were 1,274 households in Myerstown, of which 29.4% had children under the age of 18 living in them. Of all households, 40.3% were married-couple households, 18.8% were households with a male householder and no spouse or partner present, and 30.0% were households with a female householder and no spouse or partner present. About 31.5% of all households were made up of individuals and 15.9% had someone living alone who was 65 years of age or older.

There were 1,372 housing units, of which 7.1% were vacant. The homeowner vacancy rate was 2.5% and the rental vacancy rate was 5.4%.

Racial composition as of the 2020 census
Race	Number	Percent
White	2,818	91.1%
Black or African American	60	1.9%
American Indian and Alaska Native	0	0.0%
Asian	24	0.8%
Native Hawaiian and Other Pacific Islander	1	0.0%
Some other race	46	1.5%
Two or more races	145	4.7%
Hispanic or Latino (of any race)	197	6.4%

=== 2000 census ===
At the 2000 census, there were 3,171 people, 1,265 households, and 810 families residing in the borough. The population density was 3,559.1 inhabitants per square mile (1,374.2/km^{2}). There were 1,339 housing units at an average density of 1,502.9 per square mile (580.3/km^{2}). The racial makeup of the borough was 97.48% White, 1.41% African American, 0.00% Native American, 0.44% Asian, 0.00% Pacific Islander, 0.22% from other races, and 0.45% from two or more races. 0.95% of the population were Hispanic or Latino of any race.

There were 1,265 households, 29.6% had children under the age of 18 living with them, 50.4% were married couples living together, 9.5% had a female householder with no husband present, and 35.9% were non-families. 31.5% of households were made up of individuals, and 16.1% were one person aged 65 or older. The average household size was 2.33 and the average family size was 2.91.

In the borough, the population was spread out, with 22.2% under the age of 18, 7.0% from 18 to 24, 29.6% from 25 to 44, 19.2% from 45 to 64, and 22.0% 65 or older. The median age was 38 years. For every 100 females there were 85.8 males. For every 100 females age 18 and over, there were 81.5 males.

The median household income was $36,563 and the median family income was $45,698. Males had a median income of $31,985 versus $20,684 for females. The per capita income for the borough was $17,177. 6.6% of the population and 4.6% of families were below the poverty line. 8.4% of those under the age of 18 and 9.5% of those 65 and older were living below the poverty line.

== Notable person ==
- Kate Stoltz, model
