= Tamaqua =

Tamaqua may refer to:

- Tamaqua, Pennsylvania, a borough in eastern Schuylkill County, Pennsylvania
- Tamaqua station, a disused railway station in Tamaqua, Pennsylvania
- Tamaqua (Lenape chief), a Lenape chief who died in 1770
- Tamaqua (YTB-797), a United States Navy Natick-class large harbor tug named for Tamaqua, Pennsylvania.
