= Tamaqua Historic District =

Historic district in Pennsylvania, United States

- U.S. National Register of Historic Places
- U.S. Historic district
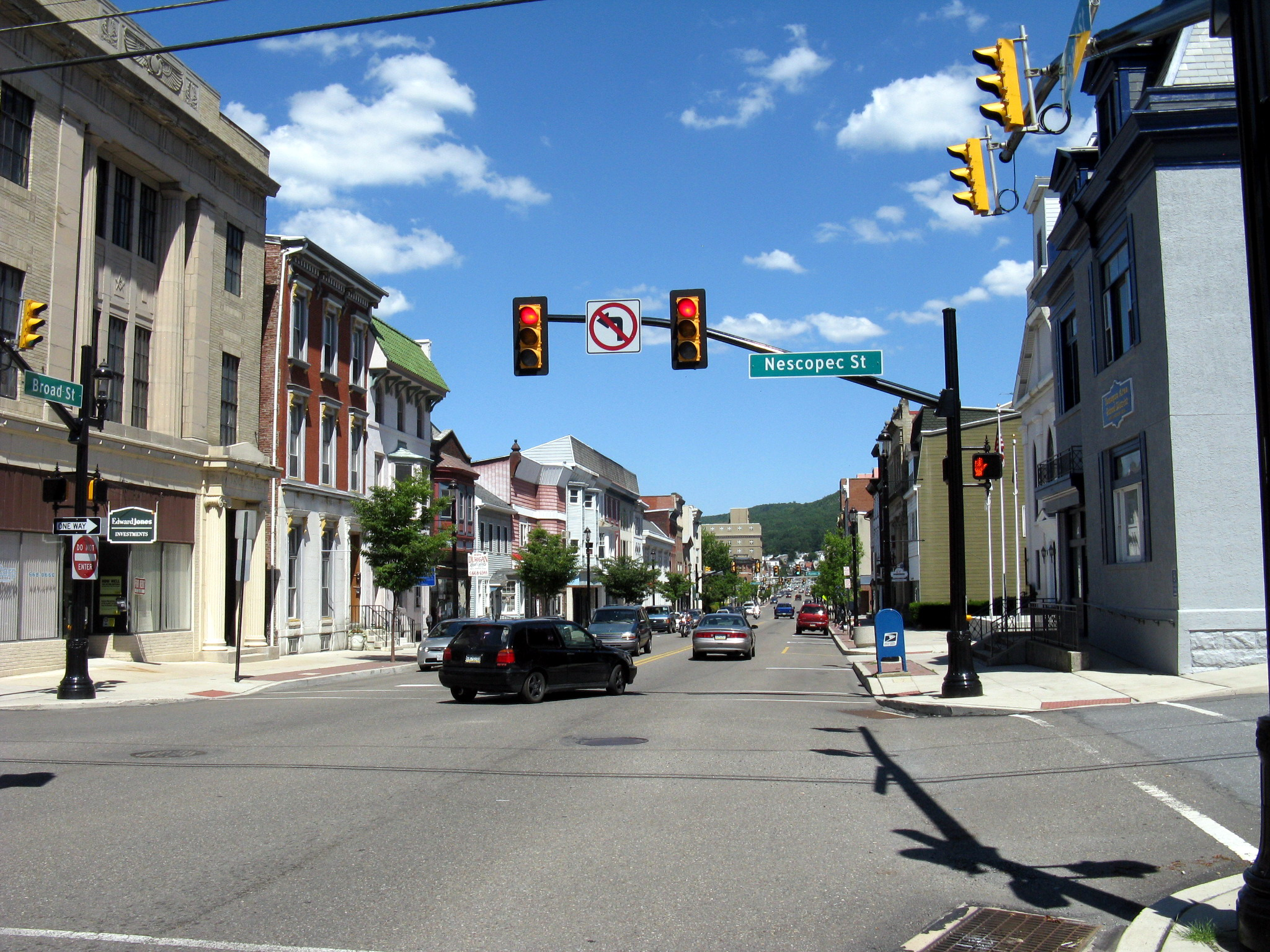
- Tamaqua Historic District, July 2010

- Location within Pennsylvania Location within the United States
- Location: Roughly bounded by the Odd Fellows Cemetery, Rowe & Mauch Sts., East End Ave., Mountain Ave., and West Cottage Ave., Schuylkill Township and Tamaqua, Pennsylvania
- Coordinates: 40°47′59″N 75°57′29″W
- Area: 178.6 acres (72.3 ha)
- Built: 1801
- Architect: Schlegel, James; et al.
- Architectural style: Queen Anne, Second Empire, et al.
- NRHP reference No.: 01000059
- Added to NRHP: February 2, 2001

The Tamaqua Historic District is a national historic district that is located in Schuylkill Township and Tamaqua, Schuylkill County, Pennsylvania.

== History and architectural features ==
This district includes 944 contributing buildings, three contributing sites, eight contributing structures, and three contributing objects that are located in the central business district and surrounding residential areas of Tamaqua.

The residential buildings principally date to the early twentieth century and are mostly two-story structures of brick and frame construction that were designed in a variety of popular architectural styles, including Queen Anne, Late Victorian, Italianate, and Colonial Revival.

Notable non-residential buildings include the Little Schuylkill Hotel (1827), White Swan (c. 1845), Washington House (c. 1842-1850), Shepp Building, Elks Lodge, Peoples Trust Company Building (c. 1915), Tamaqua National Bank (1908), First National Bank of Tamaqua (1905, 1919), U.S. Post Office (1932), Majestic Theater and Hotel, Hegarty Blacksmith Shop (1848), Conrad Biscoff Planing Mill and Furniture Factory (1865), Tamaqua Manufacturing Company (1910), Calvary Episcopal Church (1851), First Methodist Church (1852), St. Jerome's Roman Catholic Church (1856), American Hose Company (1881), East End Fire Co. (1923), and the former Tamaqua Armory.

The contributing sites are St. Jerome's Cemetery (c. 1837), Odd Fellows Cemetery (1865), and the foundation of the Fitzpatrick Shirt Factory (1888). Contributing structures include three runs of iron steps and five bridges.

Located in the district and separately listed are the Anthracite Bank Building, George Ormrod House, and Tamaqua station.

It was added to the National Register of Historic Places in 2001.
