= Jacob Kulick =

- Born: Jacob Adam Kulick; April 11, 1992 (age 34); Allentown, Pennsylvania, U.S.
- Origin: West Penn Township, Pennsylvania, U.S.
- Genre: Alternative
- Occupations: Singer, songwriter, record producer, audio engineer
- Labels: RCA, ENCI
- Website: www.kulickofficial.com

Jacob Kulick (born April 11, 1992), also known as KULICK, is an American recording artist, singer, songwriter, multi-instrumentalist, record producer, and audio engineer.

== Early life and education ==
Kulick was born in Allentown, Pennsylvania, on April 11, 1992. He grew up in West Penn Township, Pennsylvania with his two brothers, John and Joel Kulick, and parents John Kulick Jr. and Pamela Erbe. He was born with sensorineural hearing loss in both ears, and was bullied for his hearing aids while attending school in Tamaqua, Pennsylvania.

He began journaling and writing songs at the age of 12 as an outlet for bullying and anxiety. He taught himself several instruments while growing up. Between the ages of 13 and 16, he taught himself how to track and mix his own music, and fell in love with the songwriting process.

In 2008, Kulick started a band in high school, Story of Another. They also started playing covers and incorporating originals in their set list. The band played many bar shows as well as charity events. Kullick also self-recorded a 15-song album of his own originals in 2009 entitled For My Sanity. He sold the album on CDs to his classmates. Once graduating high school in 2010, the band members went to college, and the band was no longer active.

Kulick attended the Art Institute of Philadelphia to obtain his BS in audio engineering.

== Career ==
Kulick began his music career playing his own songs as a solo act and got his start playing shows by winning an online competition to open for YouTube sensation Tyler Ward in 2012. He continued to play venues around Philadelphia for the next few years.

In 2013, Kulick self-recorded a short acoustic rock EP titled Runaway. He performed the single "Runaway" and a cover of "Mr. Brightside" by The Killers live on WRFF, Philadelphia's alternative rock station, shortly after releasing the EP.

In 2014, he released his next self-recorded and produced studio album Truth and Liars independently under his full name "Jacob Kulick." Jacob shot his first music video for his single "Truth and Liars" in August 2013.

In 2015, a nine-song EP High in Limbo was released and made available via Spotify and iTunes. Shortly after this release, Ja Kulkick started working at CBS Radio in New York City, where he met a contact who connected him with RCA Records executive Joe Riccitelli. Kulick met with Joe Riccitelli for the first time in September 2015, playing him songs from High in Limbo.

Over the next two years, Kulick wrote over 100 songs, showing his progress to RCA on a monthly basis. In 2016, he decided to start fresh with a new logo and a new stage name, slimmed down from "Jacob Kulick" to "Kulick."

In 2017, Kulick started releasing songs that he wrote from the past two years, titling the collection "PRJ001." In January 2017, he released singles "Entropath", "Goner", and "Last Call."

On February 1, 2017, Kulick released a special project titled "H", which included a documentary and song. The project is about the heroin epidemic happening in his hometown of Tamaqua, Pennsylvania. The song is a poem that was written by Alexandria Sienkiewicz two months before her accidental overdose.

The song and documentary created online traction, reaching over 22,000 people on Facebook. It received coverage from multiple radio stations and local television, which created some traction for Kulick with RCA.

In July 2017, KULICK signed with RCA / Gold N' Retriever Records. He also signed a publishing deal with Sony ATV. His band inckuded Keith Gensure (drummer) and Jerome Betz (bass player) (formerly members of Story of Another).

KULICK released his first single "Ghost" along with a music video on April 27, 2018. The song entered at number 33 on the Billboard Mainstream Rock in July. This release was also the start of Kulick's first nationwide radio promo tour. On October 27, 2018, KULICK performed the single, along with a few other songs at 94.5FM's Buzzfest, sharing the stage with A Perfect Circle, Chevelle, Dirty Heads, Mike Shinoda, Puddle of Mudd, Scott Stapp, The Struts, The Nixons, Badflower, and others.

KULICK released his second single "Colors" along with a music video on October 29, 2018.

Kulick released his third single "Hole in My Head" along with a music video on November 15, 2018.

Kulick released his first EP with RCA Records on November 16, 2018, titled Hydroplane. The body of work received over 1,000,000 streams within six months of its release on Spotify.

Kulick released "Scatterbrain," a song co-written with April Rose Gabrielli on March 28, 2019.

Kulick released his debut album "Yelling in a Quiet Neighborhood" on October 16, 2020. The album consist of 9 songs, including the singles "Rope," "Talking To The Ceiling," "The Way I Am," and "Just Be Friends."

In June 2018, Kulick began his first tour with Sleeping With Sirens and The Rocket Summer as an acoustic opener. This was their first nationwide tour, consisting of playing 500–1000 cap rooms across the United States from July 7 to August 9. On October 27, 2018, the band performed at 94.5FM's Buzzfest, a radio festival in Houston.

In November 2018, KULICK went on his first headline tour, playing major cities for rock and pop music bands, including New York City, Philadelphia, and Scranton. The eight day tour went on from November 26 to December 3.

Kulick toured the United States and Canada from April to May 2019, supporting Andy Black and The Faim. After this tour, they played shows, opening for New Politics, Third Eye Blind, and Jimmy Eat World.

== Personal life ==
In 2013, Kulick engaged his high school sweetheart, Samantha, while they were living together in Philadelphia. They married in the fall of 2016. They divorced in early 2020.

== Discography ==
=== As Jacob Kulick ===
- "For My Sanity" (2009)
- Runaway EP (2013)
- Truth and Liars EP (2014)
- High in Limbo (2015)
- "Entropath" (Single) (2017)
- "Goner" (Single) (2017)
- "Last Call" (Single) (2017)
- "H" (Single) (2017)

=== As Kulick ===
- "Ghost" (Single) No. 33 U.S. Hot Mainstream Rock Tracks (2018)
- "Colors" (Single) (2018)
- "Hole in My Head" (Single) (2018)
- Hydroplane (EP) (2018)
- "Scatterbrain" (Single) (2019)
- "Yelling in a Quiet Neighborhood" (Album) (2020)
- "Everyone I Know Will Die" (Album) (2022)
