= Playa del Fuego =

Mid-Atlantic BurningMan Regional Event

Coordinates: 40.777480°N 76.02282°W

- Frequency: Once annually (Memorial Day Weekend) Was twice annually until Spring 2017 (Spring and Fall)
- Locations: Tamaqua, Pennsylvania, U.S.
- Inaugurated: August 1998
- Most recent: May 21-25, 2026
- Participants: 1200
- Website: playadelfuego.org

Playa del Fuego, also known as PDF, is a regional event held annually in Tamaqua, Pennsylvania. It is inspired by the annual Burning Man festival in Nevada. The event is held in the Mid-Atlantic U.S. annually. The event is held over Memorial Day weekend (there is no longer a second, fall event). The event draws national participation from Delaware, Maryland, New Jersey, Pennsylvania, and other states. The 2026 event was held from May 21 to May 25 in Tamaqua. The 2027 event will be from May 27 to May 31.

Playa del Fuego is a camping event that celebrates art for art's sake and espouses a gift economy where no vending, sales or barter are permitted. Visual and performance artists from all over the mid-atlantic region and the East Coast create a temporary community for the weekend. Participants share a wide range of talents from sculpting, painting, music, theatre, and DJing, to alternative forms of expression such as games, performance art, and circus talents such as juggling and fire spinning.

The event adheres to the ten principles of the Burning Man event in Nevada. Among these are the LNT (Leave No Trace) philosophy, an environmental policy whereby participants are obligated to remove every piece of refuse that they generate while at the event, taking it with them when they leave. The themes of radical self-expression and radical self-reliance are also borrowed from Burning Man. In addition, the event is considered a "no spectators" event, meaning that all attendees are expected to actively participate in its creation, staffing, and general philosophy.

According to the official website, it is "a celebration of the spirit of radical self-expression, community, and participation". The event is planned and run completely by volunteers. The volunteer areas include: the PDF Rangers, First Aid, Gate Crew, DPW, LNT, Participation Station, Lamp Lighters, and Sound Patrol.

Gates open for Playa del Fuego Thursday afternoon of Memorial Day weekend. Playa del Fuego culminates with a bonfire on Saturday night; however, instead of a human effigy as at Burning Man, a wooden pony is burned in honor of the event's origins on Assateague Island in Maryland. A Fire Conclave and Drum Circle directly precede the main burn. In recent festivals, a secondary burn has taken place the following night, during which other works of "burnable art" are burned. The event ends on Monday at noon.

== History ==
PDF began with a small group in 1998 on a beach at Assateague Island. Eventually, the event grew too large for that location and moved to private property in the Odessa/Townsend area of Delaware to accommodate the hundreds of participants who were attending the event. In 2018, the event moved to Tamaqua, Pennsylvania

=== Timeline of the Assateague Beach Burn ===
The Assateague Beach Burn was the progenitor event of Playa Del Fuego.

	Season/Year	Dates of Event	Location	Participants	Description of Effigy	Historical Notes
i	Summer 1998	8/1 to 8/2/1998	Assateague Island	~20	The first effigy was a "Burning Man," facing and pointing west toward the Black Rock Playa.	First ever Assateague Beach Burn.
ii	Fall 1998	10/24 to 10/25/1998	Assateague Island	~30	Burning Woman effigy with square breasts. Artists: Glenn and Ursula.	
iii	Spring 1999	5/22 to 5/23/1999	Assateague Island	~30	Burning Man effigy; medium: cardboard. Artist: Lizard. Burning Man effigy; medium: popsicle sticks, scrap wood. Artist: Andy Wing.	
iv	Summer 1999	7/24 to 7/25/1999	Assateague Island	n/a	Burning Man effigy supported by tripod; medium: solid wood blocks.	
v	Fall 1999	10/23 to 10/24/1999	Assateague Island	~60	Burning Man effigy, arms raised. Artist: Kevin.	

=== Timeline of Playa Del Fuego (since 2000) ===
	Season/ Year	Dates of Event	Location	Ticket Price	Participants	Registered Theme Camps	Description of Effigy	Historical Notes
I	Spring 2000	5/11 to 5/13/2000	Assateague Island	No tickets	70+	n/a	Burning Man effigy, arms raised, fire shooting from each hand. Artist: Kevin. Also 5 popsicle stick men. Artist: Andy Wing.	Regarded as the first "Playa Del Fuego" by event historian Andy Wing because this was the first time that the Assateague Beach Burn was extended to a 3-day event.
II	Summer 2000	8/4 to 8/6/2000	Assateague Island	No tickets	n/a	n/a	Unknown	
III	Fall 2000	10/13 to 10/15/2000	Assateague Island	No tickets	n/a	n/a	Burning Man effigy.	
IV	Spring 2001	4/27 to 4/29/2001	Assateague Island	No tickets	150+	n/a	"Leaning Man" effigy, 20 ft tall. Artist: Fred. Also 5 popsicle stick men, each 6 ft tall. Artist: Andy Wing.	Last Playa Del Fuego held on the beach at Assateague Island.
V	Fall 2001	10/19 to 10/21/2001	Odessa, DE	Unknown	230+	n/a	First time that a "Burning Pony" was placed atop the ceremonial bonfire in honor of the event's historical roots on Assateague Island.	First time Playa Del Fuego held in Odessa, DE. First time tickets are sold and event is insured.
VI	Spring 2002	5/24 to 5/27/2002	Odessa, DE	Unknown	382	n/a	n/a	
VII	Fall 2002	10/11 to 10/14/2002	Odessa, DE	Unknown	n/a	n/a	n/a	
VIII	Spring 2003	5/23 to 5/26/03	Odessa, DE	Unknown	n/a	n/a	n/a	This was the legendary "Mud Burn."
IX	Fall 2003	10/10 to 10/13/03	Odessa, DE	Unknown	n/a	n/a	n/a	
X	Spring 2004	5/28 to 5/31/2004	Odessa, DE	Unknown	n/a (sold out)	n/a	n/a	First time tickets were sold out.
XI	Fall 2004	10/8 to 10/11/2004	Odessa, DE	Unknown	n/a	n/a	n/a	
XII	Spring 2005	5/27 to 5/30/2005	Odessa, DE	Unknown	625 (sold out)	n/a	n/a	
XIII	Fall 2005	10/7 to 10/10/2005	Odessa, DE	Unknown	n/a	n/a	n/a	
XIV	Spring 2006	5/25 to 5/29/2006	Odessa, DE	Unknown	800+	n/a	n/a	First time event was extended from 4 to 5 days (beginning on Thursday). pyramid of exotic hardwood (aka pyramid of porn) burned on Friday
XV	Fall 2006	10/5 to 10/9/2006	Odessa, DE	$35	~800	n/a	Sculpture of horse bucking back, lit with giant zippo light and fuse. major pyrotechnics. mounted on shipping container with the 3 wise monkeys made of steel, revealed as it burnt down. artist monk e burnswell; medium: natural wood and plywood.	Rain and mud Friday and Saturday, beautiful sunshine Sunday.
XVI	Spring 2007	5/24 to 5/28/2007	Odessa, DE	$35	800 (sold out)	n/a	Pegasus taking flight; medium: natural wood and wicker.	Burn took place during a fantastic night time electrical storm which surrounded the playa with lightning strikes. fall of the house of burner burned on Saturday night with a fire so bright you could "see it from space"
XVII	Fall 2007	10/4 to 10/8/2007	Odessa, DE	$35	800 (sold out)	n/a	7 pony head totem minor pyrotechnics also lit with single match; medium: natural wood, plywood and paper mache'. artist monk e burnswell	
XVIII	Spring 2008	5/22 to 5/26/2008	Odessa, DE	$35	1000 (sold out)	n/a	Silhouette cut-out of a horse head; medium: plywood.	Ticket cap increased by 25%, and still sold out. First Totem Burn on Sunday night.
XIX	Fall 2008	10/9 to 10/13/2008	Odessa, DE	$35	1000 (sold out)	n/a	Seahorse; medium: natural wood and driftwood; minor pyrotechnics.	
XX	Spring 2009	5/21 to 5/25/2009	Odessa, DE	$35	1000 (sold out)	n/a	Silhouette cut-out of a horse rearing up; medium: painted plywood and wood scales.	Second Totem Burn on Sunday night.
XXI	Fall 2009	10/8 to 10/12/2009	Odessa, DE	$35	1000 (sold out)	n/a	Huge rocking horse (multicolored); fully interactive prior to burn; medium: painted wood; pyrotechnics. Artists: Amira and The Wineman.	
XXII	Spring 2010	5/27 to 5/31/2010	Odessa, DE	$50	1275 (sold out)	n/a	Exterior: My Little Pony (pink); Interior: Skeletal demon dark horse (black); medium: painted wood effigy and pedestal; ignited by flaming arrows; pyrotechnics. Artist: The Connecticut Oakburners	Ticket cap increased by 27.5%, and still sold out. Ticket price increased nearly 43% to help create a fund for future purchase of land. New ticket purchasing system used. First year that the back gate was staffed for entire event.
XXIII	Fall 2010	10/7 to 10/11/2010	Odessa, DE	$50	1275 (sold out)	n/a	Large Pegasus with Movable wings created by Barrel of Fun	TBD
XXIV	Spring 2011	5/26 to 5/30/2011	Odessa, DE	$50	1275 (sold out)	40	Two story "pony tower" with a pony on both the first and second stories; artist Gordon B. McCracken medium: thick beam construction for tower, plywood ponies.	Tallest effigy in PDF history.
XXV	Fall 2011	10/6 to 10/10/2011	Odessa, DE	$50	1275 (sold out)	42	Rocking Pony by Fogie Camp.	Muddiest site conditions since Spring 2003. For the first time, a temple was built for the festival and burned on Sunday evening.
XXVI	Spring 2012	5/24 to 5/28/2012	Odessa, DE	$50	1275 (sold out)	21+	Kissing ponies; two wicker ponies, rearing up on hind legs and nuzzling noses.	New sound policy enforced. Beautiful secondary burn on Sunday night.
XXVII	Fall 2012	10/4 to 10/8/2012	Odessa, DE	$50	1275 (sold out)	40	"Single Carousel Horse on a Pole" by Reginald Conyard Jr. Painted carousel horse with zebra stripes; layered plywood with a weighted rope an pulley system; pony shifted into 3 different poses as specific ropes burned.	Fairly muddy conditions.
XXVIII	Spring 2013	5/23 to 5/27/2012	Odessa, DE	$50	1275 (sold out)	40	Built by Camp Buffalo, an interactive pony with a slide that allowed participants to be "reborn a buffalo."	Rainy, windy, and muddy.
XXIX	Fall 2013	10/10 to 10/14/2013	Odessa, DE	$50	1275 (sold out)	57	Multiple tiers with a central platform with a pony statue.	Rainy, muddy, and windy. That burn we had a "lake".
XXX	Spring 2014	5/22 to 5/26/2014	Odessa, DE	$50	~1375 (sold out)	??	Pallet pile with wire-wrap pony sculpture hidden inside.	Muddy Thursday. Sunny, warm and dry for the rest.
XXXI	Fall 2014	10/10 to 10/13/2014	Odessa, DE	$50	~1400 (sold out)	??	Wooden Pegasus with flapping connected to a pulley system.	
XXXII	Spring 2015	5/21 to 5/25/2015	Odessa, DE	$50	??	??		
XXXIII	Fall 2015	10/8 to 10/12/2015	Odessa, DE	$50	??	??		
XXXIV	Spring 2016	5/26 to 5/30/2016	Odessa, DE	$50	??	??		
XXXV	Fall 2016	10/6 to 10/10/2016	Odessa, DE	$50	??	??	"Everything is Awesome" Pony - Participants were invited to play with collection of oversized modular blocks which were later assembled into a large, colorful pony effigy.	Muddy exodus. Cars stuck in field.
XXXV	Spring 2017	5/25 to 5/29/2017	Odessa, DE	$50	??	??	"Sleipnir" - a rearing 8-legged horse effigy built with a heavy timber skeleton then clad with wood.	Muddiest event to occur on the land in Odessa, DE. Eventually became the last event to occur on that particular site.
XXXVI	Fall 2017	09/28 to 10/01	Elkins, West Virginia	$50	??	35		Fall event renamed "Constellation"
XXXVII	2018	05/24 to 05/28	Tamaqua, PA, PA	$50	??	26	"Free Biscuit" - a geometric pony effigy with a central structure of lumber intersected by triangular planes of plywood. Fireworks.	Hot and dry weather
XXXVIII	2019	05/23 to 05/27	Tamaqua, PA, PA	500 Tier 1 tickets at $65 each / 250 Tier 2 at $80	759 attendees of 811 tickets sold	26	An elevated platform with a pony cutout topped with a circular table supporting a rearing pony effigy. Fireworks.	
2020	Cancelled	N/A	N/A	N/A	N/A	N/A	Due to COVID-19 Pandemic event was cancelled.	
2021	Cancelled	N/A	N/A	N/A	N/A	N/A	Due to COVID-19 Pandemic event was cancelled.	
XXXIX	2022	??	Tamaqua, PA, PA	??	836 attendees of 1,077 tickets sold	??	??	

== Event size and ticketing ==
As of spring 2010, the ticket cap was raised to 1,275. Tickets offered for sale on the PDF website generally sell out quickly. The primary factor which prevents the ticket cap from being increased to meet demand is the number of volunteers available to staff various aspects of the event. Over the years, as the volume of volunteers (people x shifts covered) has increased, the ticket cap was increased. Other factors taken into account when raising the ticket cap are the availability of space for parking and the impact of noise on surrounding residents.

Tickets cost US$90 each (though a few hardship ticket scholarships are available by application), and are sold in two releases, with about half the event tickets sold in the first release, and the remaining half sold in the second release. Tickets sales for the spring PDF usually begin mid-March on the event website, and ticket sales for the fall event usually begin in mid-August.

== Ethics ==
Several themes and/or ethics are encouraged during the event, based on the ten principles of Burning Man. These include:

- Leave No Trace (or LNT) - everyone at the event is asked to clean up after themselves so that when the event is done, the campground's state has not deteriorated.
- Gift Economy - no sale or barter is allowed at the event. Participants are asked to bring what they can and gift as they are able.
- Radical Inclusion - everyone is welcome to be a part of the event.
- Radical Self-Reliance - do what needs to be done and do not be a burden to others.
- Radical Self-Expression - be yourself, however you wish. Allow others to do the same.
- Communal Effort - work together to make the best possible.
- Civic Responsibility - every citizen bears a responsibility to contribute to the community as a whole.
- Participation - no one attending is an observer; no spectators.
- Immediacy - participants are to become part of the event and explore their inner selves in relation to the event and surroundings
- Decommodification - rejection of corporate advertising, branding and sales of any kind.
