= Lydia Holman =

American nurse (1868–1960)

- Born: January 5, 1868; Tamaqua, Pennsylvania, U.S.
- Died: February 25, 1960 (aged 92); Asheville, North Carolina, U.S.
- Occupation: Nurse

Lydia Holman (1868–1960) was an American nurse who dedicated her life to promoting rural public health. She worked as a nurse and provided social services in the community in Mitchell County, North Carolina. She also served in the United States Army Nurse Corps during the Spanish-American War.

== Early life and education ==
Holman was born in Tamaqua, Pennsylvania, on January 5, 1868, to Robert Holman and Elizabeth Ann Holman. She graduated from the Philadelphia General Hospital School of Nursing in 1895.

== Career ==
From 1895 to 1897, Holman served as a nurse for physicians in Pottsville, Pennsylvania. When the Spanish-American War began, she served in the United States Army Nurse Corps, first in Lexington, Kentucky in 1898, then in Columbus, Georgia in 1899.

In December 1900, Holman was called to the rural town of Ledger in Mitchell County, North Carolina to nurse a patient suffering from typhoid. As her patient recovered, she began nursing other members of the rural community, and she was moved by the community’s lack of access to health care. She moved to Philadelphia to work as a nurse among the poor in May 1901, and from 1901 to 1902 she worked at the Henry Street Settlement in New York City. But she returned to Ledger late in 1902, and she continued working in Mitchell County until the 1950s, when she retired due to illness.

As a nurse in Ledger, she lived alone and rode on horseback to her patients’ homes, accepting whatever patients could pay according to their means. She also served as a midwife and performed minor surgeries and dental work. In 1907, she delivered an address to the Nurses’ Associated Alumnae of the United States (now called the American Nurses Association), describing her work and appealing for support.

In 1911, she moved to Altapass, another small town in Mitchell County. Together with Dr. William Welch of Johns Hopkins Medical School, she founded the Holman Association for “the promotion of rural nursing, hygiene, and social service” throughout the United States. Although the association was dissolved two years later, after the American Red Cross announced that it would begin supporting rural nursing across the nation, it helped finance the founding of a hospital in Altapass. The hospital, built on land donated by Carolina, Clinchfield, and Ohio Railway, was run by Holman and was the only hospital in the county at the time.

In addition to nursing patients in Mitchell County and surrounding counties, Holman provided social services and public health education to the community. She taught people about hygiene, proper clothing and nutrition, and dental health, distributing food, toothbrushes, and toothpaste to those who needed it. Next to the Holman Hospital, she founded and ran a library that lent books to children and schools in the area. Every year, she collected toys and warm clothing, and on Christmas she would dress up as Santa Claus and distribute a gift to each child in the community, earning her the nickname “Santa Claus’s Helper.” She also fought to improve roads in the area, and her efforts led to the improvement of the road to Altapass. She received funding and supplies from Holman Committees in Brooklyn, Boston, and Philadelphia, which circulated yearly reports on her and her work.

== Leadership and awards ==
Holman served on the first board of directors of the National Organization for Public Health Nursing. When state and federal funding for public health became available in Mitchell County, she was put in charge of these funds, and in 1936 she was elected a member of Mitchell County Board of Health. Her work was endorsed by the Russell Sage Foundation, the American Red Cross, and the National Organization for Public Health Nursing.

== Death and legacy ==
On February 25, 1960, at age 92, Holman died in the Oteen Veterans Administration Hospital in Asheville, North Carolina. She is buried in Memorial Cemetery in Spruce Pine, North Carolina.

Her papers are now in the Schlesinger Library at the Radcliffe Institute for Advanced Study at Harvard University.
