= Coaldale, Schuylkill County, Pennsylvania =

Borough in Pennsylvania, US

Coaldale, Pennsylvania
- Borough
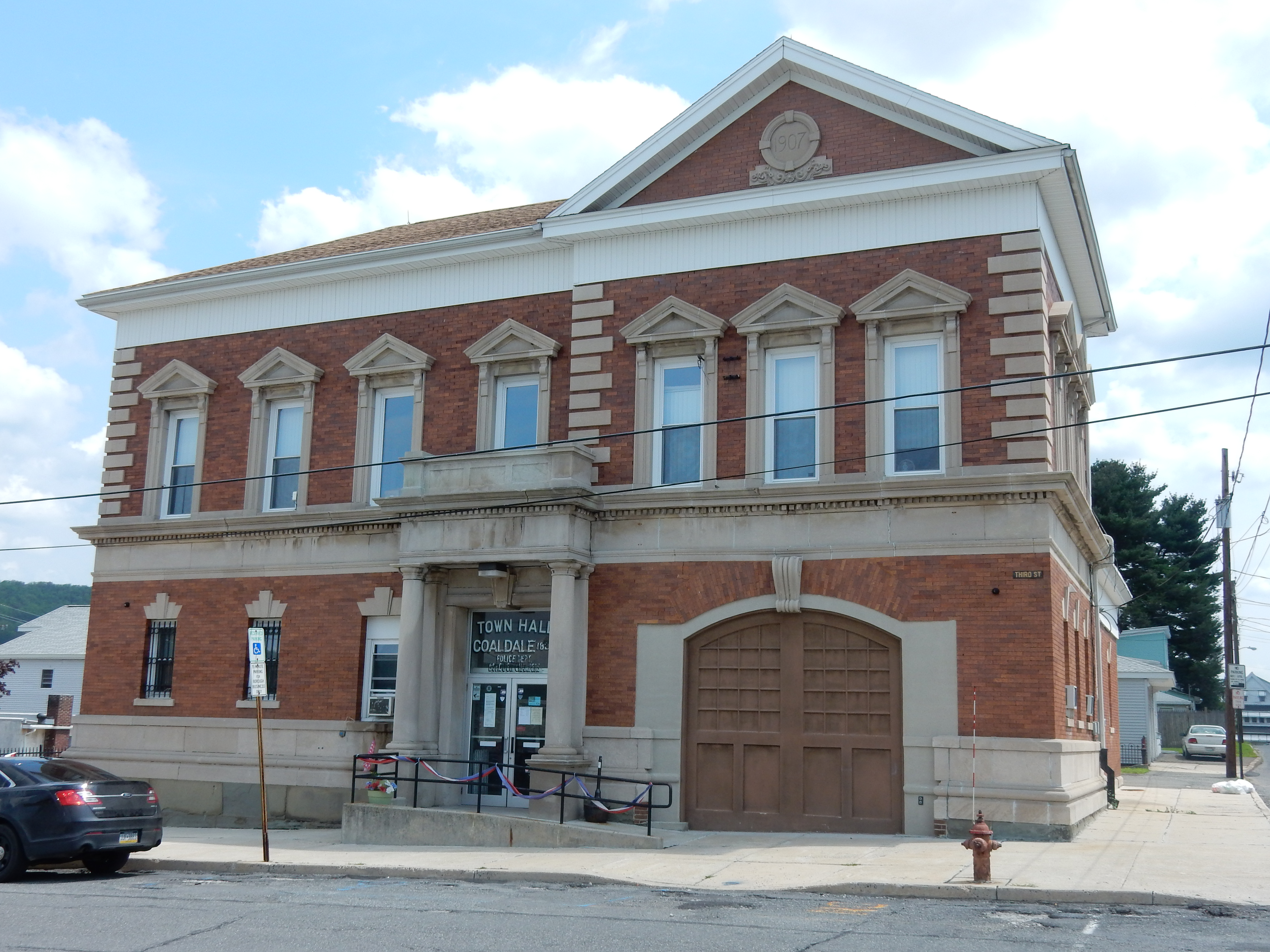
- Coaldale Town Hall in July 2015

- Location of Coaldale in Schuylkill County, Pennsylvania

- Location of Coaldale in Pennsylvania Coaldale (the United States)
- Coordinates: 40°49′20″N 75°54′36″W
- Country: United States
- State: Pennsylvania
- County: Schuylkill
- Incorporated: 1906

Government
  - Type: Borough Council
  - Mayor: Daniel Weiksner

Area
  - Total: 2.17 sq mi (5.63 km^{2})
  - Land: 2.17 sq mi (5.63 km^{2})
  - Water: 0 sq mi (0.00 km^{2})
- Elevation: 968 ft (295 m)

Population (2020)
  - Total: 2,426
  - Density: 1,115.2/sq mi (430.58/km^{2})
- Time zone: UTC-5 (Eastern (EST))
  - Summer (DST): UTC-4 (EDT)
- ZIP Code: 18218
- Area codes: 570 and 272
- FIPS code: 42-14600
- GNIS feature ID: 1215545
- Website: coaldaleborough.org

Coaldale is a borough in Schuylkill County, Pennsylvania, United States. Initially settled in 1827, it was incorporated in 1906 from part of the former Rahn Township. The borough is named for the coal industry when it was one of the principal early coal mining centers. Coaldale is in the southern Anthracite Coal region in the Panther Creek Valley, a tributary of the Little Schuylkill River, along which U.S. Route 209 was eventually built between the steep climb up Pisgah Mountain from Nesquehoning to its east and Tamaqua, approximately five miles to its west.

The town is virtually joined at the hip to nearby Lansford, to its immediate east; both were founded as company towns on lands owned by and mined by the Lehigh Coal & Navigation Company (LC&N) while technically on opposite sides of the county lines. The history, business situation, and fortunes of not just the two, but of three towns, the third being the nearby Summit Hill, located a few thousand feet upslope, were tied in decades of co-development because the LC&N had built the western terminus of the nation's second railroad, the Summit Hill and Mauch Chunk Gravity Railway to ship coal out, and opened multiple mines throughout Coaldale and Lansford and the rest of the Panther Creek Valley in the days when railroads were coming into their own. The town has a bus stop with a mural on one side reading: "Everybody's Goal Is Mine More Coal" and the other side reading: "A Car More a Day Means More Pay". The area on the western border of the borough is known as Seek.

There is a historical marker for Mother Jones located in Coaldale, as she organized many strikes and protests on behalf of coal miners around the country for improved pay, safer work environment and child labor laws. She organized a march for child workers that started in Coaldale and proceeded to McAdoo. At one trial for Mary Jones, a prosecution lawyer famously said, "there sits the most dangerous woman in America... to put down their tools and walk out."

== History ==
=== 19th century ===
The origins of today's Coaldale have their beginnings in West Penn and Rahn townships. Rahn Township was formed from West Penn Township in 1860. Initially, the land was developed for its timber tracts, with only a few farms to indicate an attempt at agriculture. The beginnings of present-day Coaldale date from 1827, when John Moser and his wife settled there. Moser was born on May 24, 1805, in Tamaqua and was the son of Mr. and Mrs. Burkardt Moser, the original settlers of Tamaqua. Upon arriving at a site that is present day Coaldale, John Moser built a log cabin on the north side of what was known as the Manila Grove Park. Today, the St. Luke's Hospital is located on this site.

Coaldale (alternatively known in the 19th century as Coal Dale) developed from scattered villages. The first dwelling houses (other than Moser's) were erected nearby in 1846 in what was known as Bugtown, located along the main road directly below the current St. Luke's Hospital. Houses were then erected in 1848 at old Coal Dale on the Summit Hill road.

Gearytown was established in 1866. That village was named in honor of the then Pennsylvania Governor, John W. Geary. Houses in Bull Run were erected in 1864 by the Greenwood Coal Co., run by Charles F. Shoener and William Carter, who purchased the nearby breaker of the same name. Shortly after the mines began working, the population increased, and many new dwellings were built, practically all by the company. New Wales, or New Coal Dale, began later in 1868 or 1869. Housing on the line of Schuylkill and Carbon counties were erected beginning in 1870. Centerville was located on the south side of Coaldale but was abandoned because of mines located beneath the surface.

Coal Dale received a post office in 1871, thereby formalizing the name. The Greenwood breaker burned down in 1874 and in 1878 the Lehigh Navigation and Coal Co. purchased this property. Coaldale was in the midst of the following LC&N mines - Nos. 4–6, Lansford; Nos. 8, 9, 12, Coaldale; Nos. 10 and 15, Greenwood; No. 11, Rahn; and No. 14, Tamaqua.

Coaldale was historically a coal-mining town, where the entire region was effectively the property of the Lehigh Coal & Navigation Company. The mine, the railroads the LC&N put in and a small shirt factory were the main historic industries in Coaldale. Because of the adverse topology, the LC&N took several decades to survey and drive a railbed with a negotiable grade from Mauch Chunk through Nesquehoning, along the Nesquehoning ridge to Hometown, and then up the Panther Creek Valley from Tamaqua.

=== 20th century ===
Coaldale also became the site of a State Hospital that was established to take care of coal miners. During the early years of mining in the Panther Valley, badly injured miners were taken to Ashland or Pottsville. This took a great deal of time. In 1909, the miners of the valley volunteered a pay day for the construction of a hospital, while the LC&N donated a site for the building and matched every dollar donated. The area chosen for the hospital was Manila Grove, a park near where John Moser had built his first home. The hospital was completed on July 11, 1910. and exists today as St. Luke's Miners Memorial Medical Center.

== Geography ==
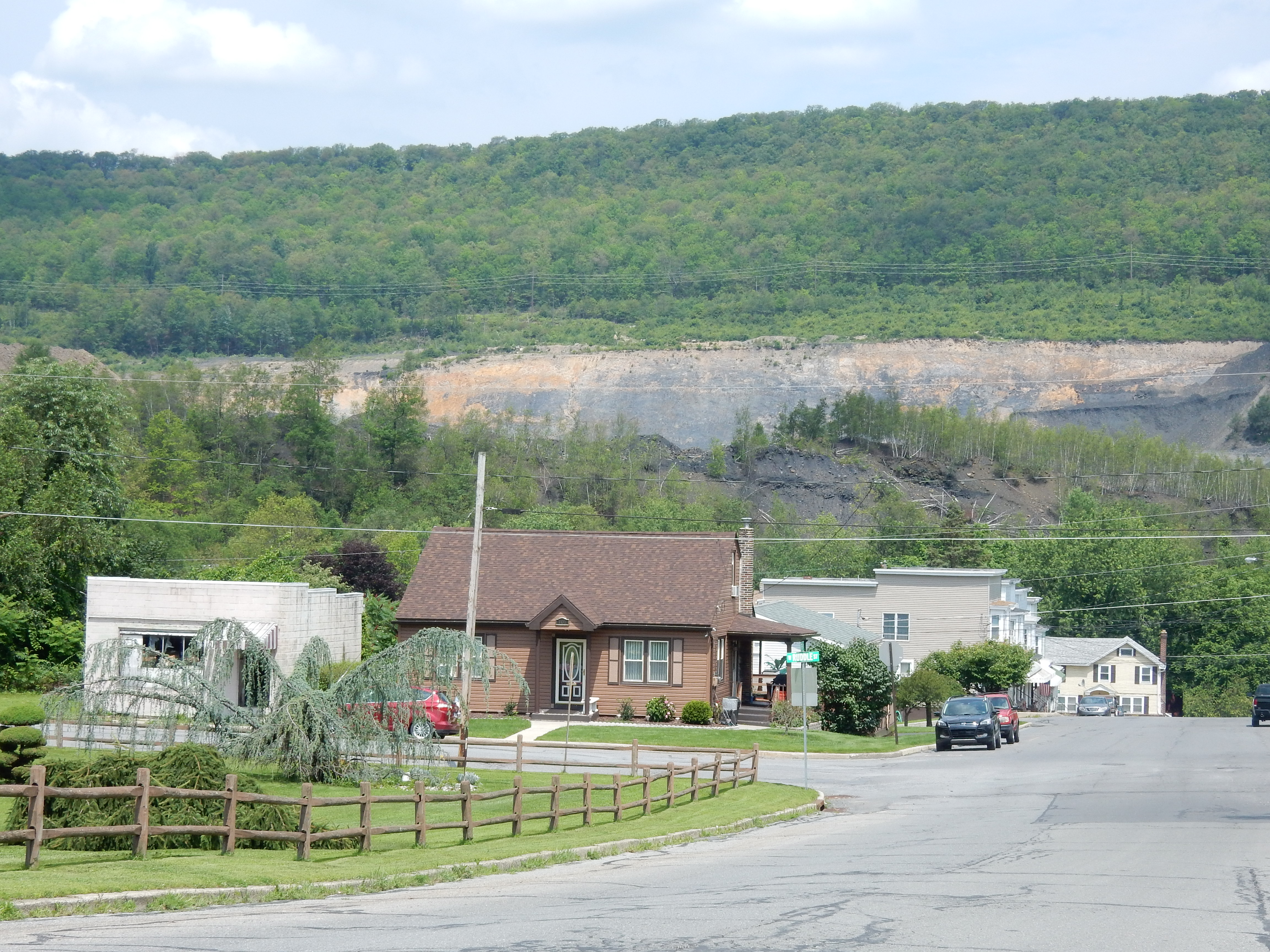
Coaldale in July 2015

Coaldale is located at 40°49′20″N 75°54′36″W (40.822234, -75.910115), which is (technically) one mile southwest of Lansford as both municipalities lie along the border of Carbon and Schuylkill Counties. It is also five miles northeast of Tamaqua, 27 miles northwest of Allentown, and nine miles south of Hazleton. It is located on the northwestern fringe of the Lehigh Valley and just two ridgelines away from the nearby Poconos, and drains to the Delaware River by way of Panther Creek, the Little Schuylkill River, and the Schuylkill River. Coaldale sits atop one of the richest coal seams in the eastern end of the southern Coal Region, which is still being exploited by a successor company of the LC&N (called the Old Company in the valley), the Lehigh Coal and Navigation Company (or the New Company). Coaldale's elevation is 1050 feet above sea level. According to the United States Census Bureau, the borough has a total area of 2.2 square miles (5.7 km^{2}), all land.

Coaldale is served by U.S. Route 209, which runs through neighboring Lansford's business district, serving both municipalities as their main thoroughfare. The borough's terrain is mostly hilly, many of those ancient mine tailings or culm piles, and when not developed, its lands are mostly forested.

== Demographics ==
Historical population
Census	Pop.	Note	%±
1910	5,154		—
1920	6,336		22.9%
1930	6,921		9.2%
1940	6,163		−11.0%
1950	5,318		−13.7%
1960	3,949		−25.7%
1970	3,023		−23.4%
1980	2,762		−8.6%
1990	2,531		−8.4%
2000	2,295		−9.3%
2010	2,281		−0.6%
2020	2,432		6.6%
2021 (est.)	2,431		0.0%

As of the census of 2000, there were 2,295 people, 1,046 households, and 606 families residing in the borough. The population density was 1,055.2 inhabitants per square mile (407.4/km^{2}). There were 1,209 housing units at an average density of 555.9 per square mile (214.6/km^{2}). The racial makeup of the borough was 98.34% White, 0.31% African American, 0.04% Native American, 0.26% Asian, 0.57% from other races, and 0.48% from two or more races. Hispanic or Latino of any race were 1.13% of the population.

There were 1,046 households, out of which 22.3% had children under the age of 18 living with them, 40.2% were married couples living together, 11.9% had a female householder with no husband present, and 42.0% were non-families. 38.7% of all households were made up of individuals, and 24.4% had someone living alone who was 65 years of age or older. The average household size was 2.14 and the average family size was 2.84.

In the borough the population was spread out, with 19.2% under the age of 18, 7.1% from 18 to 24, 25.6% from 25 to 44, 19.6% from 45 to 64, and 28.5% who were 65 years of age or older. The median age was 44 years. For every 100 females, there were 87.5 males. For every 100 females age 18 and over, there were 83.3 males.

The median income for a household in the borough was $23,362, and the median income for a family was $31,905. Males had a median income of $28,317 versus $18,083 for females. The per capita income for the borough was $14,021. About 8.3% of families and 13.2% of the population were below the poverty line, including 23.7% of those under age 18 and 10.5% of those age 65 or over.

== Architecture ==
Coaldale's combined town hall and fire department building was constructed in 1907 to the designs of the Wilkes-Barre architect, Owen McGlynn.

== Notable people ==
- Christine Donohue, justice of the Supreme Court of Pennsylvania
- Johnny Gildea, former professional football player
- George Welsh, former college football player, Penn State, and college football coach, Navy and University of Virginia

== Gallery ==
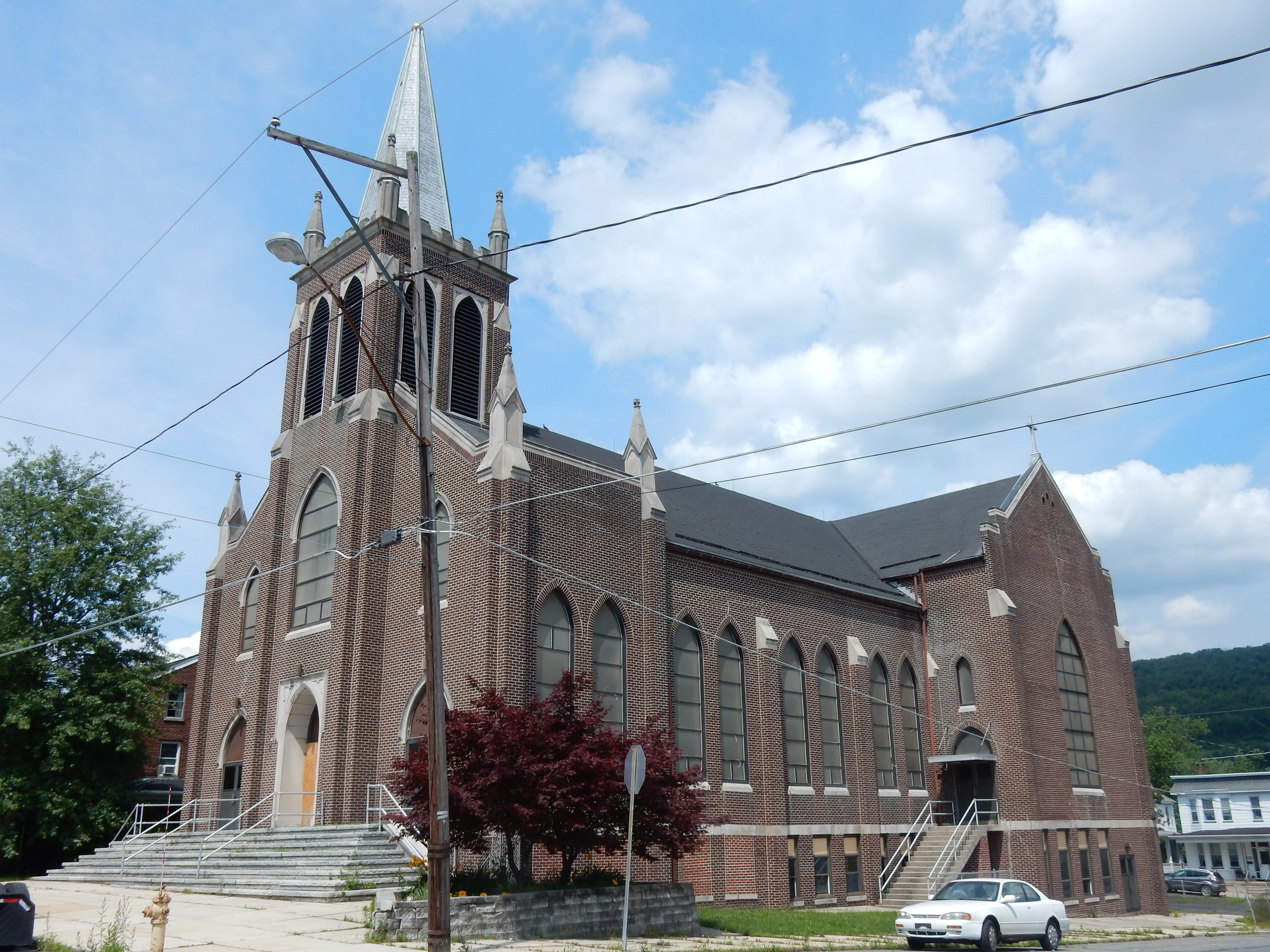
Church on Ruddle St.

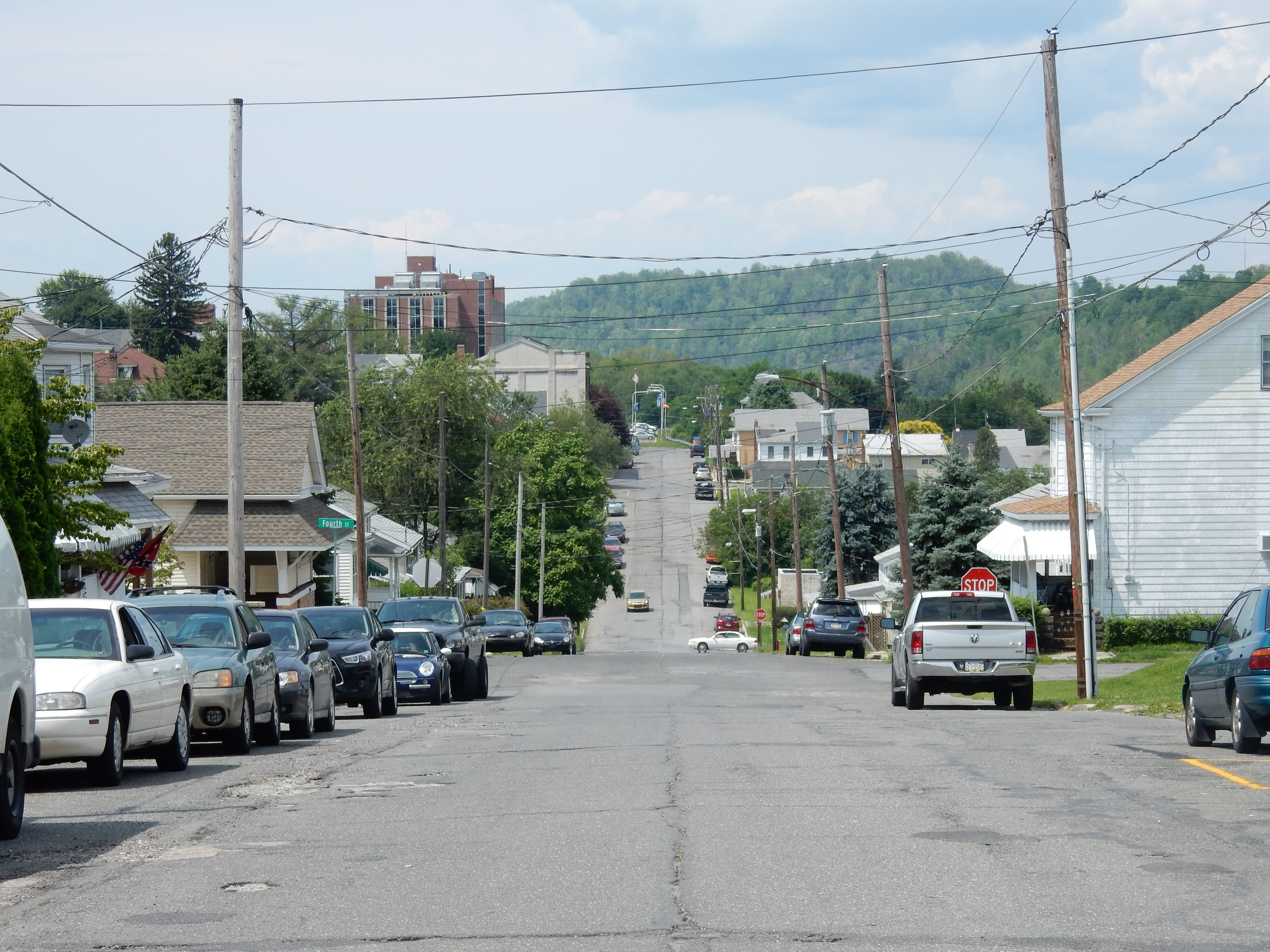
Ruddle St.

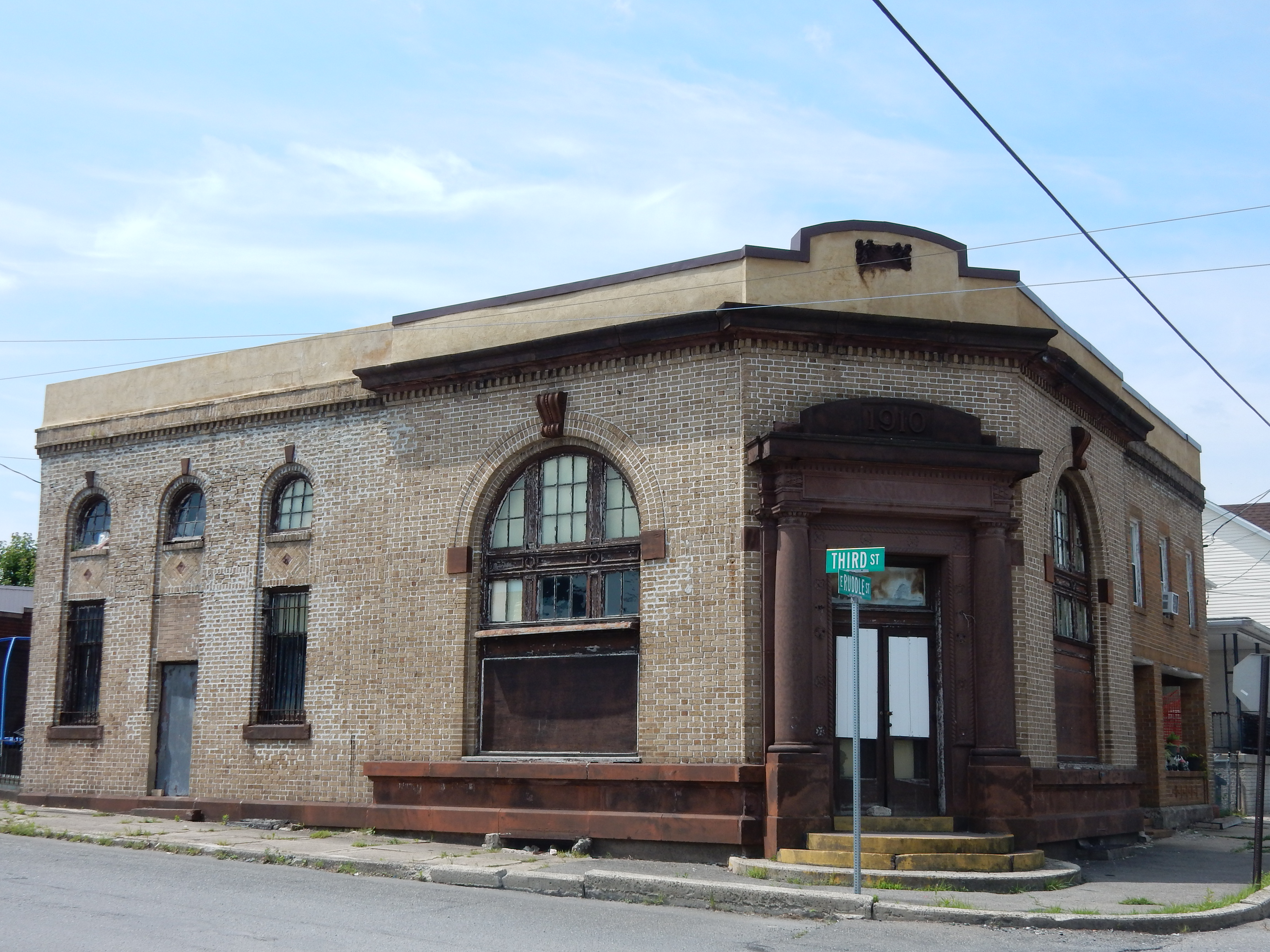
Former bank, 1910

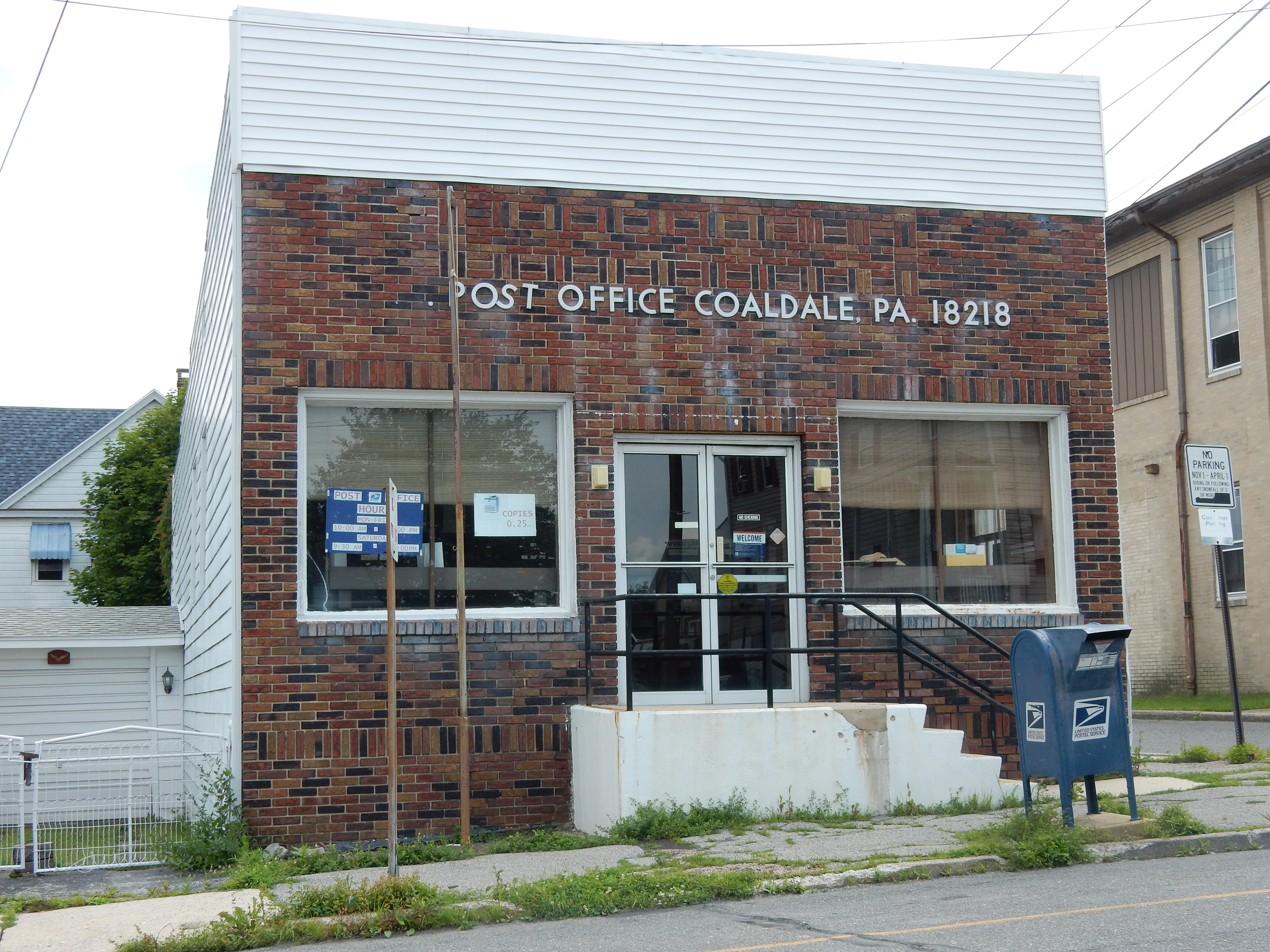
Post Office

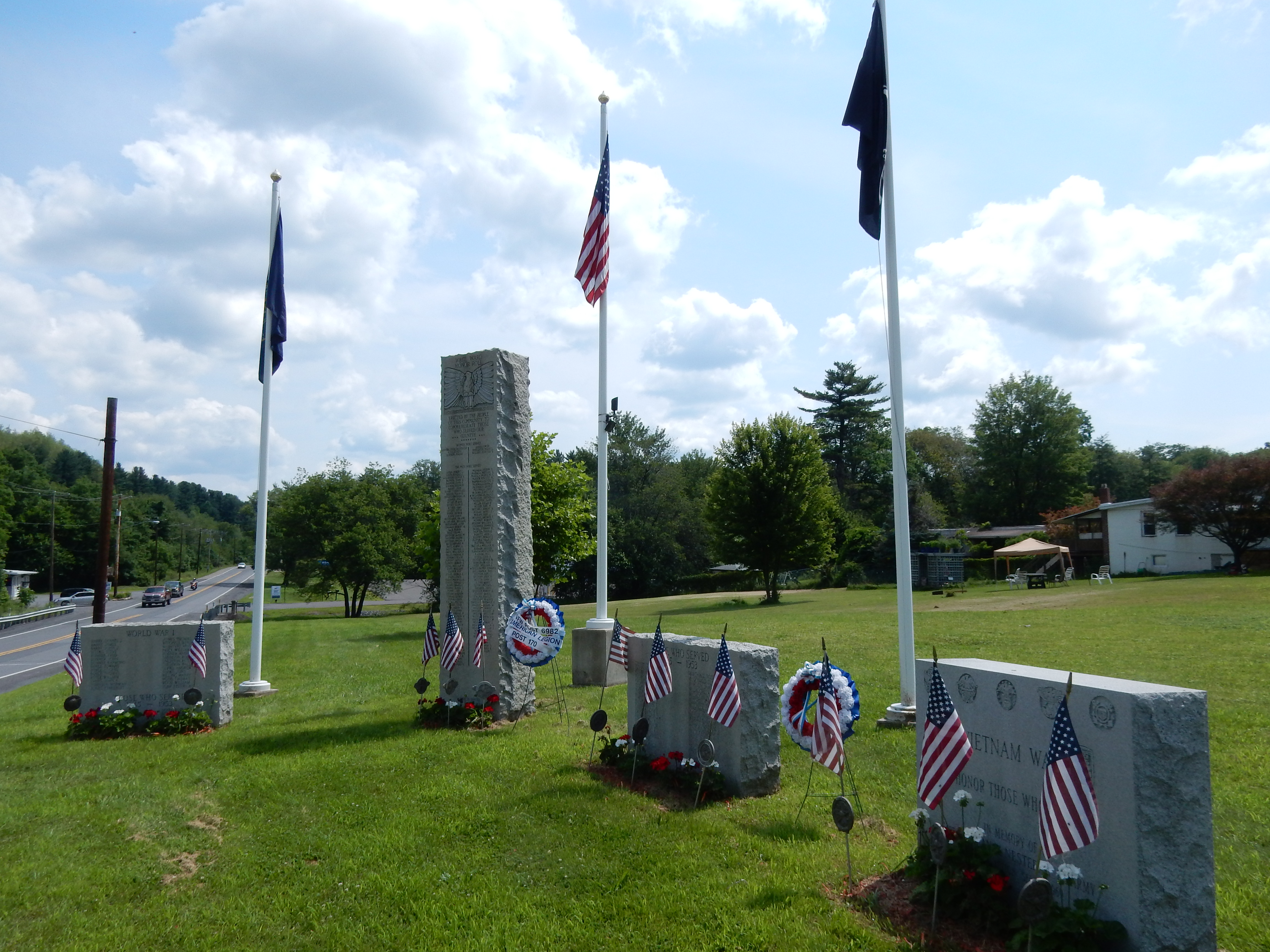
War Memorial
