= Tamaqua (YTB-797) =

Tugboat of the United States Navy

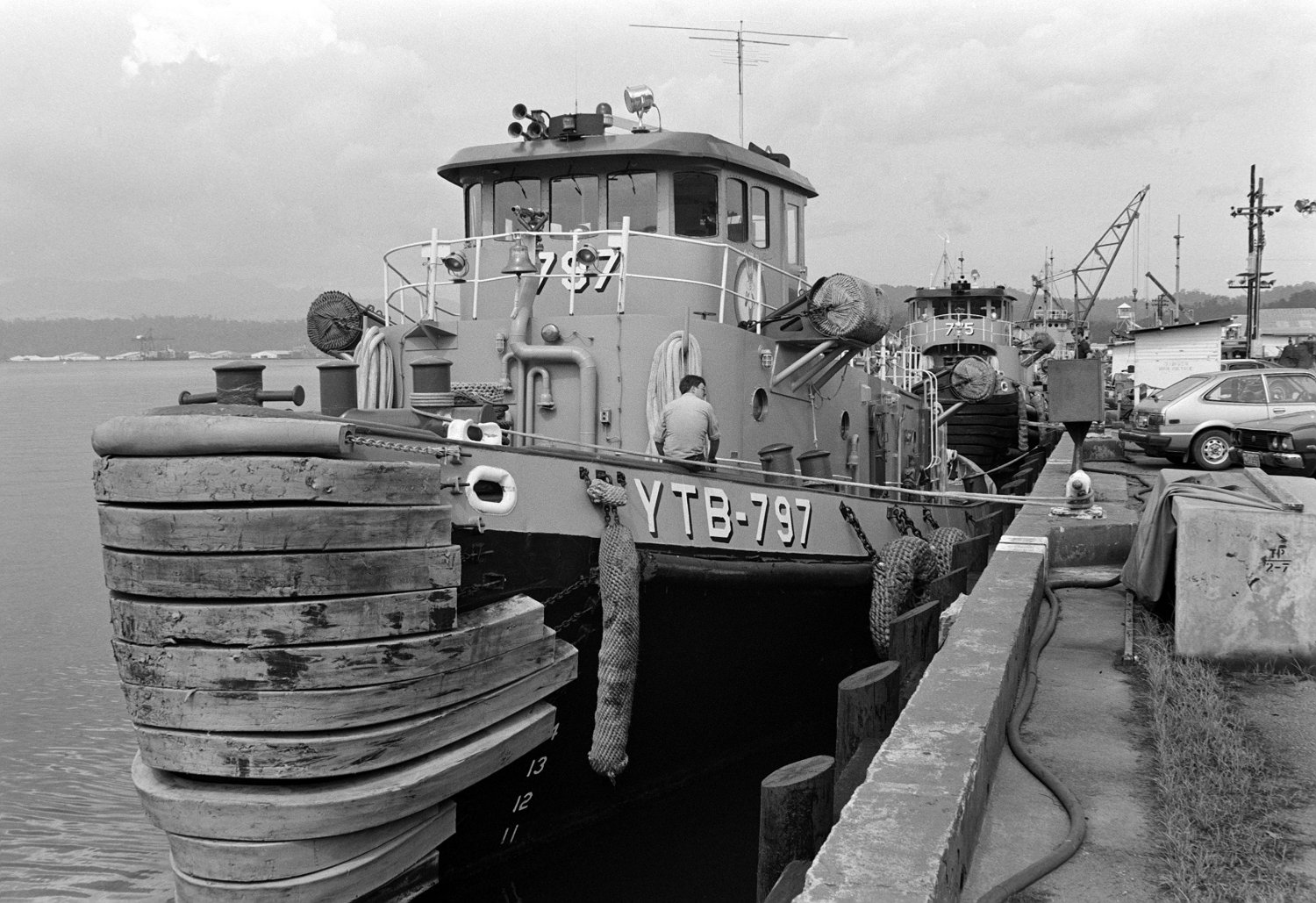
- Tamaqua (YTB-797) moored at Naval Station Subic Bay, Philippines, 26 October 1983.

History

United States
- Ordered: 15 June 1967
- Builder: Marinette Marine, Marinette, Wisconsin
- Laid down: 16 January 1968
- Launched: 14 August 1968
- In service: 26 January 1969
- Stricken: 25 May 2005
- Fate: Scrapped 18 October 2005

General characteristics
- Class & type: Natick-class large harbor tug
- Displacement: 283 long tons (288 t) (light); 356 long tons (362 t) (full)
- Length: 109 ft (33 m)
- Beam: 31 ft (9.4 m)
- Draft: 14 ft (4.3 m)
- Speed: 12 knots (14 mph; 22 km/h)
- Complement: 12
- Armament: None

Tamaqua (YTB-797) was a United States Navy Natick-class large harbor tug named for Tamaqua, Pennsylvania.

== Construction ==
The contract for Tamaqua was awarded 15 June 1967. She was laid down on 16 January 1968 at Marinette, Wisconsin, by Marinette Marine and launched 14 August 1968.

== Operational history ==
Tamaqua was assigned to the Pacific Fleet and has served at Naval Station Subic Bay throughout her career.

Stricken from the Navy List 25 May 2005, she was scrapped 18 October 2005.
