= Frank E. Graeff =

Reverend Frank E. Graeff
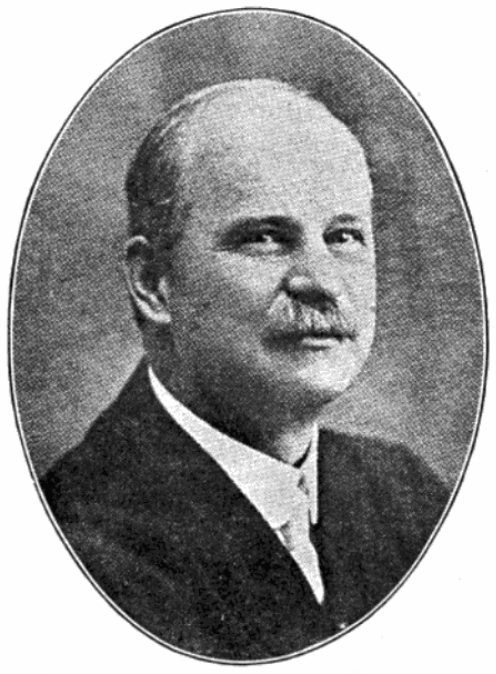
- Graeff in 1916
- Born: Frank Ellsworth Graeff; December 19, 1860; Tamaqua, Pennsylvania, U.S.
- Died: July 29, 1919 (aged 58); Ocean Grove, New Jersey, U.S.
- Other names: Sunshine minister
- Occupation: Minister
- Years active: 1890 — 1919
- Religion: Christian
- Church: Methodist Episcopal Church
- Ordained: 1890
- Writings: The Minister's Twin; "Does Jesus Care?"

Signature
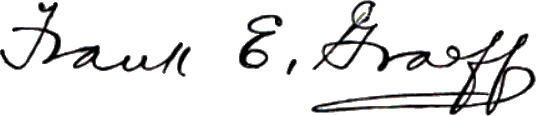

Frank Ellsworth Graeff (December 19, 1860 — July 29, 1919) was an American hymnwriter and minister in the Philadelphia Conference of the Methodist Episcopal Church. He is the author of Does Jesus Care?, which was composed by J. Lincoln Hall and published in 1905 by Hall-Mark Company in the hymn New Songs of Gospel volume two.

== Life ==
Graeff was born on December 19, 1860, in Tamaqua, Pennsylvania. At a young age, he was admitted into the Pennsylvania Conference of the Methodist Episcopal Church in 1890. He was known for his story telling ability which earned him the title "sunshine minister". Graeff wrote 200 hymns and a novel The Minister's Twin.

Graeff died on July 29, 1919, in Ocean Grove, New Jersey, at age 68.
