= Paul H. Knepper =

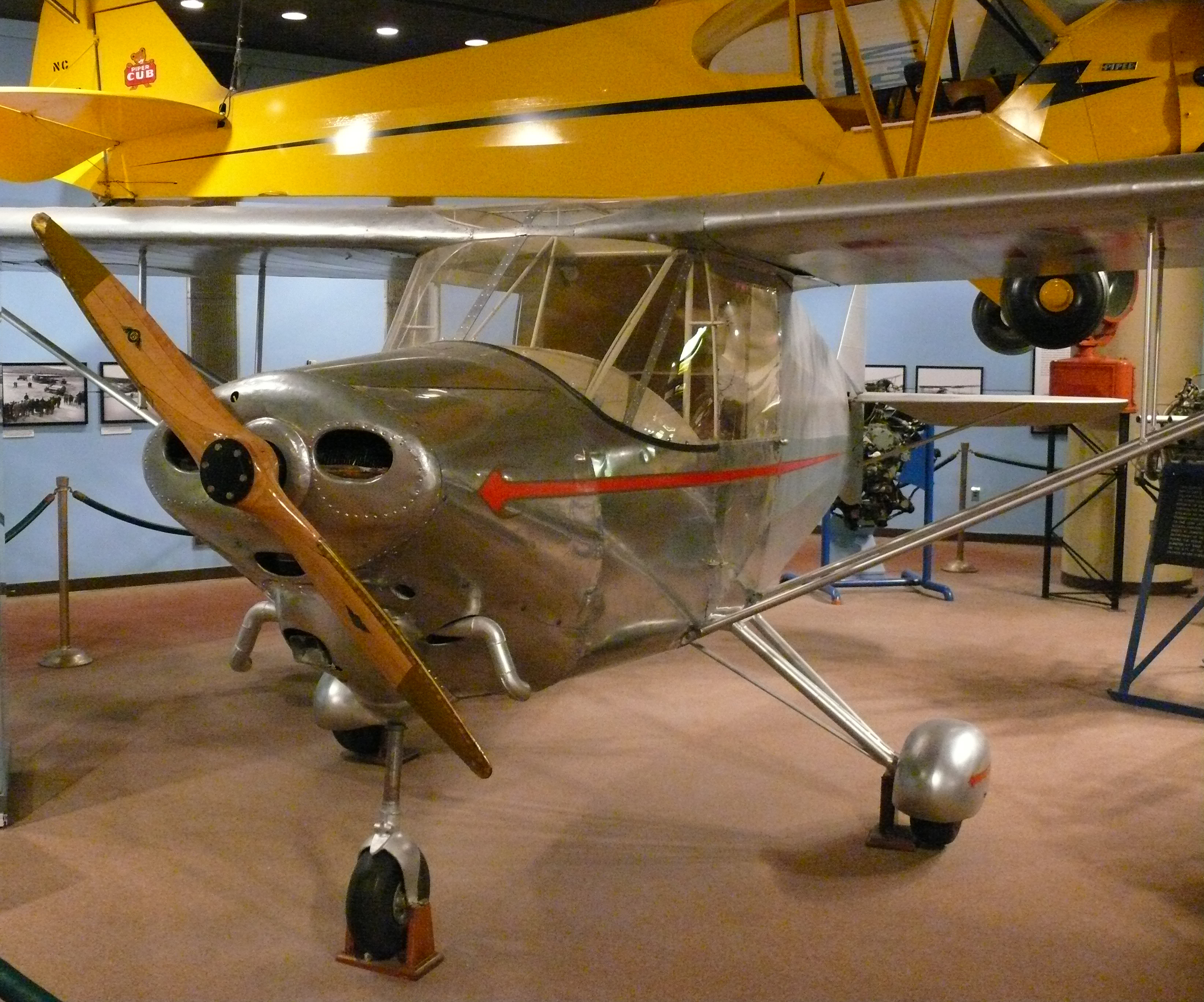
Ka-1 in the State Museum of Pennsylvania in Harrisburg

Paul H. Knepper was an American aircraft engineer.

== Early life ==
Knepper was born in Tamaqua, Pennsylvania.

== Career ==
He worked at several aircraft companies before becoming an instructor at the Pittsburgh Institute of Aeronautics, where he designed his first airplane, the Ka-1 Crusader as a prototype for a training plane that he wanted to commercially produce in Lehighton, Pennsylvania. The two-seater featured an innovative tricycle landing gear with a wheel under its nose, instead of the tail, from dragging upon landing.

Although advanced for its day the Crusader was never commercially produced, since World War II forced a halt in the manufacture of commercial aircraft.

In 1990, friends of Paul Knepper restored the Crusader, and it was donated by his widow, Ruth I. Knepper to the State Museum of Pennsylvania in Harrisburg.
