= Rahn Township, Pennsylvania =

Coordinates: 40°48′8″N 75°56′40″W

- Interactive map of Rahn Township, Pennsylvania
- Country: United States
- State: Pennsylvania
- City: Penn Township
- Neighborhood: Rahn Township

Rahn Township, Pennsylvania was a former Pennsylvania township created from the lightly populated former Penn Township of Schuylkill County, in eastern Pennsylvania.

Rahn Township was in existence from 1788–1971 and was the governmental body of the less populated lands between today's boroughs of Tamaqua and Coaldale, and Bull Run now absorbed by their growth.

Beginning in 1820, when anthracite coal deposits were being first exploited by the Lehigh Coal Mine Company and its successor Lehigh Coal & Navigation Company (1818), the sections of lands of Penn Township that would become the future Rahn Township along the Carbon County border was the mining camp that would grow to become Summit Hill, Pennsylvania, where the early coal pits exploited were at and around the peak called Sharpe Mountain of Pisgah Ridge, the place where hunter Phillip Ginter had discovered the deposits in 1791. Sharpe Mountain today is a depression, as the LC&N Co. mined that place until well into the 1840s before they had to retreat down hill and drive shaft mines at Coaldale and Lansford.
