= Megan Valentine =

American engineer

Megan T. Valentine
- Born: Circa 1976 (age 49–50); Tamaqua, Pennsylvania, U.S.

Academic background
- Education: Lehigh University (BS, physics, 1997); University of Pennsylvania (MS, physics, 1999); Harvard University, (PhD, physics, 2003)
- Thesis: Mechanical and microstructural properties of biological materials (2003)

Academic work
- Institutions: University of California, Santa Barbara

Megan T. Valentine is an American engineer. She is a professor of mechanical engineering at the University of California, Santa Barbara and Co-Director of the California NanoSystems Institute. Valentine's research focuses on understanding how forces are generated and transmitted in living materials and how they control cellular outcomes. Valentine is a Fellow of the American Physical Society and the American Institute for Medical and Biological Engineering.

== Early life and education ==
Valentine was born to parents Jonathan and Margaret Valentine in Tamaqua, Pennsylvania and attended St. Jerome's Regional School and Marian Catholic High School in Tamaqua.

While in high school, she was named a National Science Scholars Program Semi-Finalist and was chosen to attend the 1991 Central Pennsylvania Leadership Seminar. In 1993, her article His Girls was published in The Writer, a national high school student newspaper.

Valentine was the first member of her family to attend college. In 1997, she received her bachelor's degree in physics from Lehigh University in Bethlehem, Pennsylvania. She earned a master's degree in physics from the University of Pennsylvania in Philadelphia in 1999 and a PhD in physics from Harvard University in 2003. She completed a postdoctoral fellowship at Stanford University in the department of biological science.

== Career ==
In 2007, Valentine accepted an assistant professor position at the University of California, Santa Barbara (UCSB), but deferred her start date to 2008 so that she could build "sophisticated microscopy rooms that provided temperature control in a low noise (acoustic, electromagnetic, vibration) environment." Upon accepting her placement at the school, Valentine began working as the co-principal investigator for the Nanosystems Science, Engineering and Technology (INSET) program.

== Awards and honors ==
In 2013, in recognition of her research, Valentine was the recipient of the National Science Foundation's CAREER Award for her proposal, "An Integrated Approach to Neuron Mechanics: Deciphering the Functional, Mechanical, and Structural Interactions between Microtubules and Actin." In 2015, Valentine received a Fulbright Scholarship to collaborate with Professor Creton at ESPCI ParisTech to study the strength, toughness and self-healing properties of living materials in synthetic system.

In 2019, Valentine was elected a Fellow of the American Physical Society for her "pioneering research in the development of microrheology and the applications of biomechanics at multiple length scales to diverse biological systems." Two years later, she was also elected a Fellow of the American Institute for Medical and Biological Engineering for "outstanding contributions to the microscale analysis of biomaterials, fundamental science of cellular mechanics, and generation of novel bioinspired materials.' In the same month, Valentine agreed to serve as Co-Director of the California NanoSystems Institute.
