= Sharp Mountain =

Ridgeline of the Appalachians in east central Pennsylvania

Coordinates: 40.86182°N 75.83966°W

Sharp Mountain or Sharp Ridge (historically also spelled Sharpe) in eastern central Pennsylvania in the United States is a ridgeline (fold) of the Ridge-and-Valley Appalachians cut through on its east-side in the Tamaqua gap by the Little Schuylkill River which sunders it from the eastern extension of the ridgeline, the Nesquehoning Ridge. The ridgeline, located in the heart of Pennsylvania's anthracite Coal Region, drains to the Schuylkill River along its western slopes and into the Little Schuylkill River tributary of the Schuylkill River on its east.

The heavily forested, relatively steep slopes of the Sharp and Nesquehoning Mountains characterize the landscapes within Pennsylvania's Anthracite Upland. Sharp Mountain is reported as the first locale where the coal of the region was discovered by a man hunting in 1788. When another hunter found and reported anthracite five to six miles to the east of Tamaqua in what ultimately became Summit Hill, the Lehigh Coal Mining Company was formed in 1792 and began exploiting these finds.

Large areas in the valley to the northwest have been disturbed by coal mining-related activities. Much of the runoff from strip mines is retained in abandoned pits and therefore lesser amounts of surface runoff is discharged into the local creeks.
