= Dirty Head =

Mountain in the American state of Idaho

Coordinates: 42°00′19″N 112°05′08″W

Dirty Head is a summit in Franklin County, Idaho and Cache County, Utah, in the United States. With an elevation of 5,236 feet (1,596 m), Dirty Head is the 1933rd highest summit in the state of Idaho.
