= Tamaqua station =

Disused railway station in Tamaqua, Pennsylvania

Tamaqua
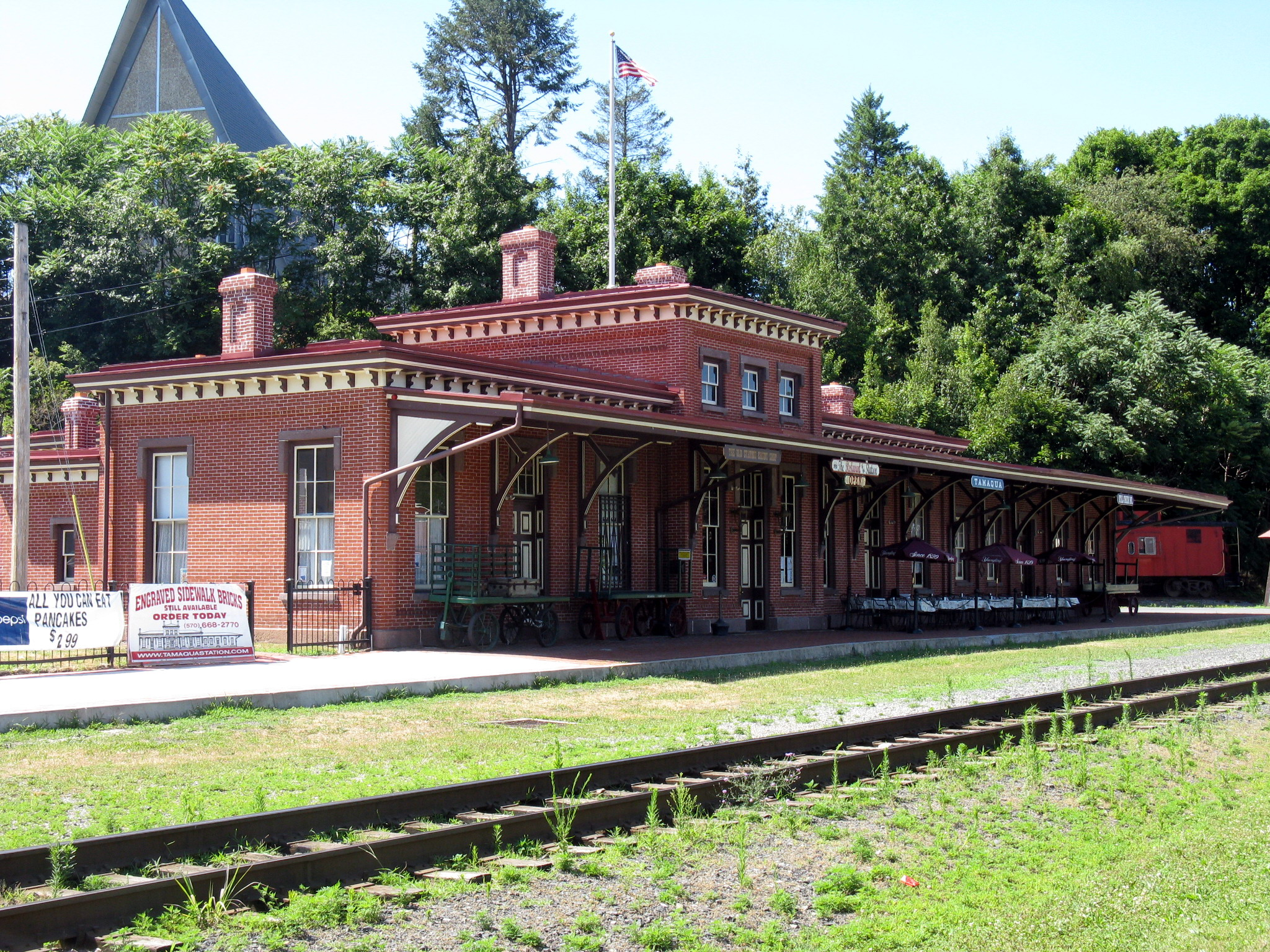
- Tamaqua station in July 2010

General information
- Location: 18 N. Railroad St., Tamaqua, Pennsylvania, U.S.
- Coordinates: 40.7980°N 75.9701°W
- System: Former Reading Railroad station

Construction
- Architectural style: Italianate

History
- Opened: 1874
- Closed: 1961
- Rebuilt: 1880, 1885

Former services
Preceding station	Reading Railroad	Following station
Newkirk toward Pottsville	Schuylkill Valley Branch	Terminus
- Reading Railroad Passenger Station—Tamaqua
- U.S. National Register of Historic Places
- NRHP reference No.: 85003164
- Added to NRHP: December 26, 1985
Location

The Tamaqua station is a historic railway station in Tamaqua, Pennsylvania, that currently serves as a visitor center, restaurant, and boarding location for Reading Blue Mountain and Northern Railroad excursion trains. It is part of the Tamaqua Historic District.

It was listed on the National Register of Historic Places on December 26, 1985, as the Reading Railroad Passenger Station-Tamaqua.

== History and architectural features ==
=== 19th century ===
This station was originally built by the Philadelphia and Reading Railroad in 1874, which had earlier acquired the Little Schuylkill Navigation, Railroad and Coal Company. It is a one-story brick building that was designed in the Italianate style.

In 1880, an addition was made to the original 1874, giving it a T-plan. In 1885, a freight house was added.

=== 20th century ===
The station ceased train operations in 1961 and was formally abandoned in 1981.

In 1984, a local family offered to purchase the railroad station and proposed that the building would be turned into a museum, similar to Steamtown, U.S.A. in Scranton.

On December 26, 1985, it was listed on the National Register of Historic Places as Reading Railroad Passenger Station—Tamaqua.

=== 21st century ===
Following a $1.5 million restoration, the building was reopened in 2004 as a heritage center.

In 2023, the station was featured on a USPS Forever stamp in a 5-stamp "Railroad Stations" series. The stamp illustrations were made by Down the Street Designs, and Derry Noyes served as the art director.
