= Anthracite Bank Building =

- U.S. National Register of Historic Places
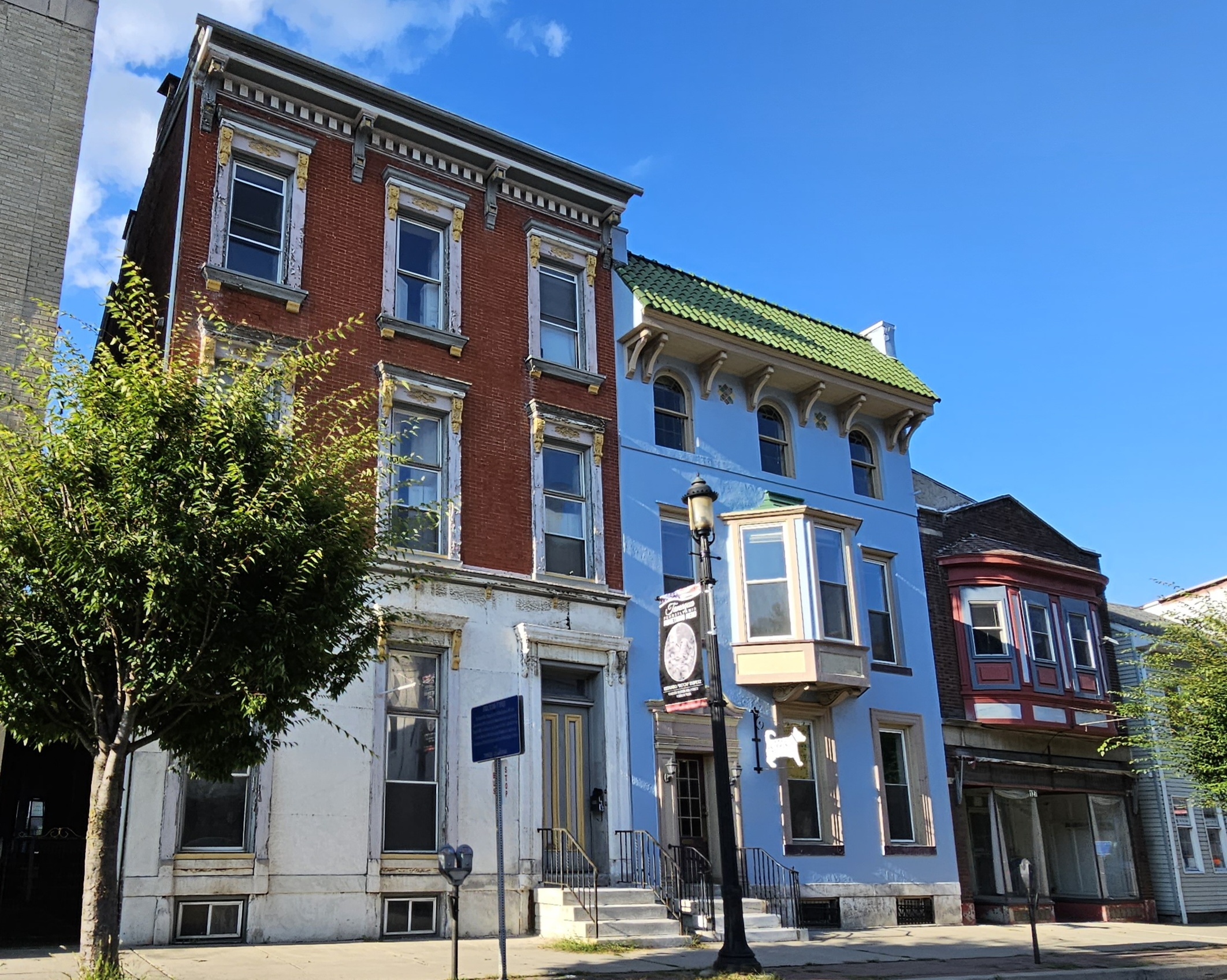
- The building (left) in 2023

- Location within Pennsylvania Location within the United States
- Location: 133 W. Broad St., Tamaqua, Pennsylvania, U.S.
- Coordinates: 40°47′50″N 75°58′23″W
- Area: 0.2 acres (0.081 ha)
- Built: 1850
- Architectural style: Italianate
- NRHP reference No.: 78002469
- Added to NRHP: September 13, 1978

Anthracite Bank Building, also known as The Beard Building, is a historic former bank building located in Tamaqua, Pennsylvania. It was built in 1850, and is a three-story, three bay wide, brick building in the Italianate style. The first floor exterior is white marble. It housed Tamaqua's first financial institution until 1865.

The building later served as home of Civil War hero Col. Henry L. Cake and wife Eliza. Cake commanded the 96th Pennsylvania Infantry Regiment, rose to the rank of brigadier general, and later served as a member of the fortieth and forty-first U.S. Congress. For several years beginning in 2002, the building served as the Anthracite Inn Bed and Breakfast, operated by owner Donald Serfass.

It was added to the National Register of Historic Places in 1978.
