= George Ormrod House =

Historic house in Pennsylvania, United States

- U.S. National Register of Historic Places
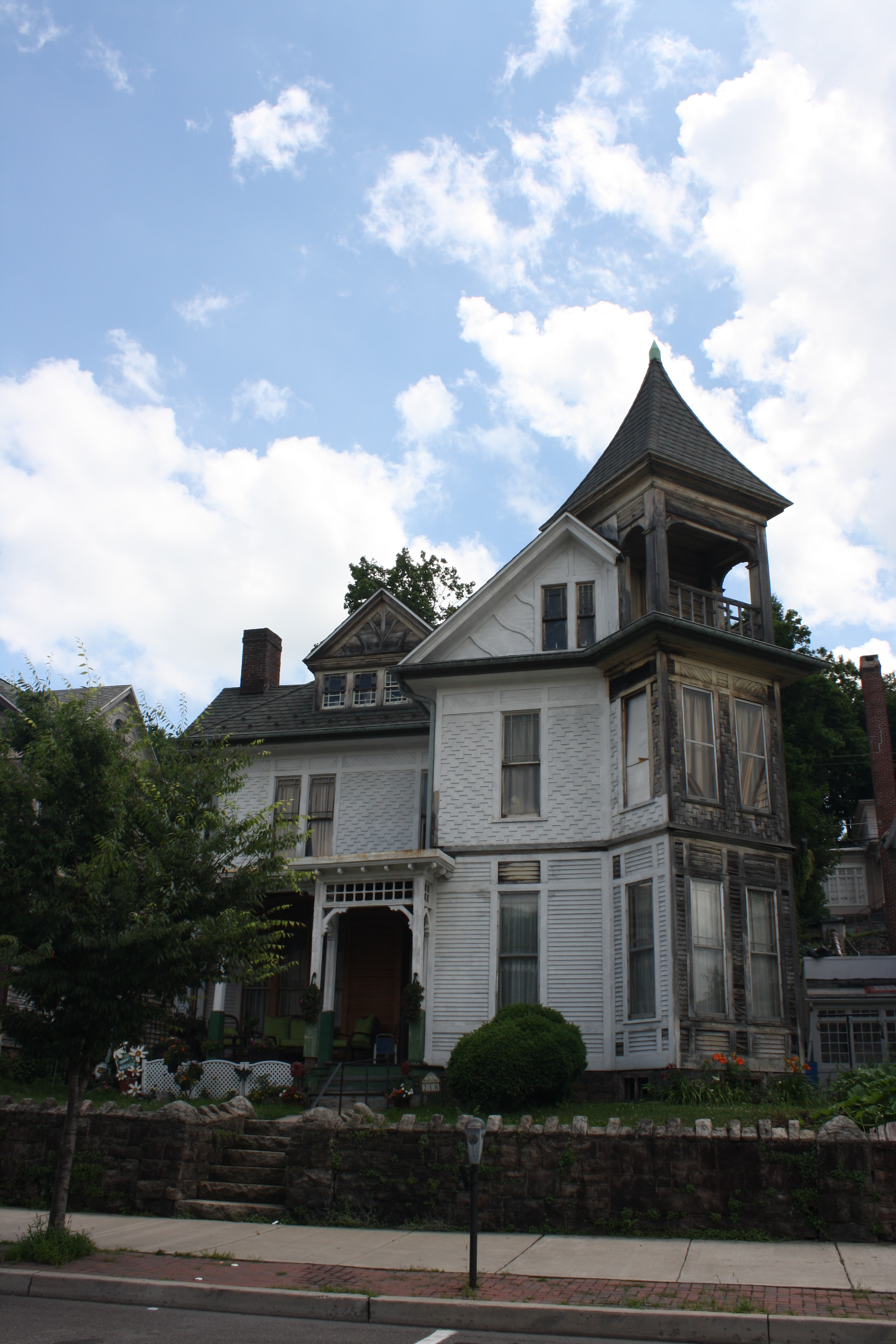
- George Ormrod House in Tamaqua, Pennsylvania in July 2013

- Location within Pennsylvania Location within the United States
- Location: 218 W. Broad St., Tamaqua, Pennsylvania, U.S.
- Coordinates: 40°47′48″N 75°58′25″W
- Area: 0.2 acres (0.081 ha)
- Built: c. 1870
- Built by: Ormrod, George
- Architectural style: Late Victorian
- NRHP reference No.: 77001193
- Added to NRHP: June 14, 1977

The George Ormrod House is an historic home which is located in Tamaqua, Pennsylvania in Schuylkill County, Pennsylvania. It was added to the National Register of Historic Places in 1977.

== History and architectural features ==
Built sometime around 1870, the George Ormrod House is a two-and-one-half-story, irregular frame dwelling, which was designed in the Late Victorian style. It features a three-story tower and twenty-seven different angles in the perimeter of the house, including a variety of octagonal and square projecting bays.
