= Tamaqua, Pennsylvania =

Borough in Pennsylvania, US

Tamaqua tëmakwe
- Borough
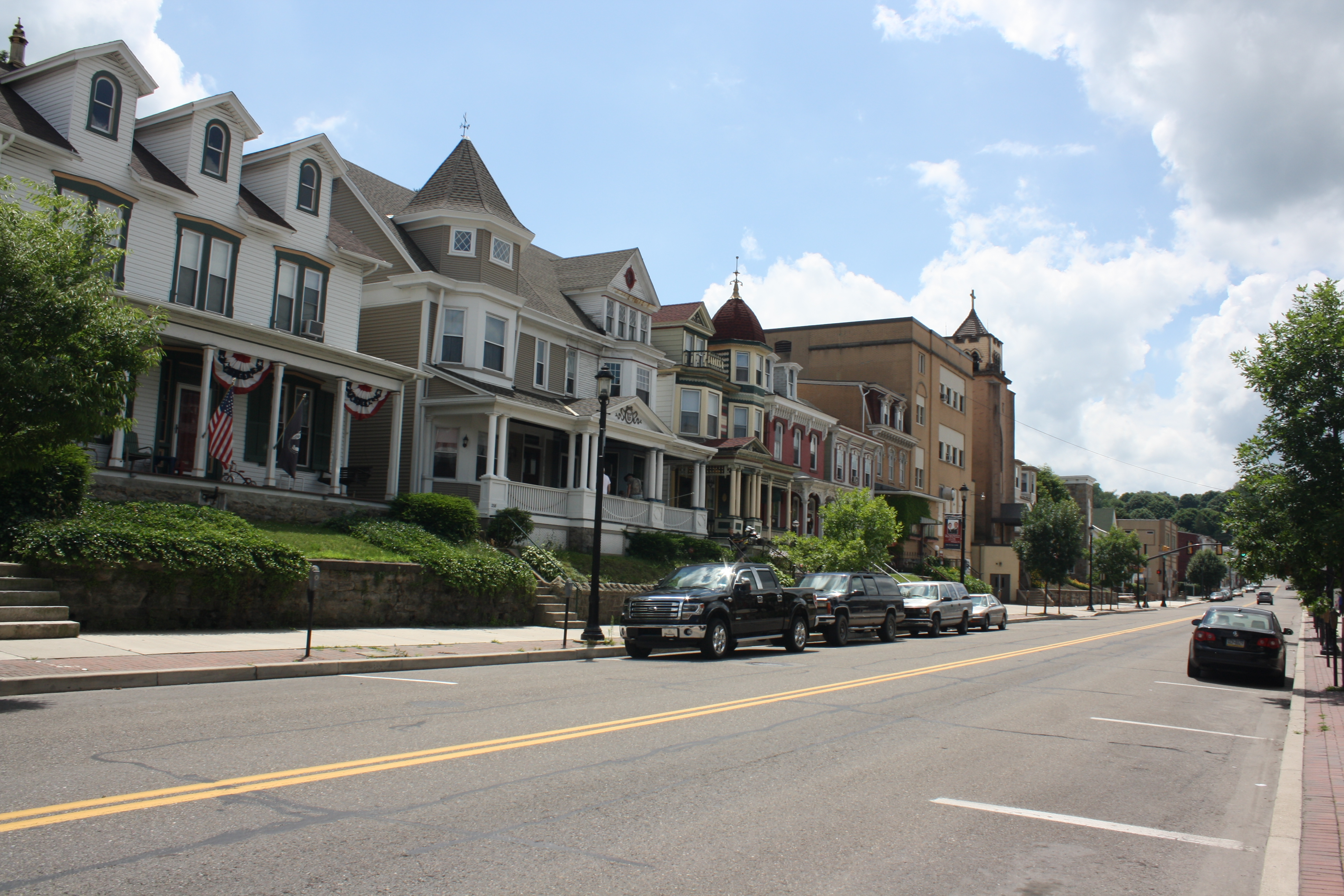
- West Broad Street in Tamaqua in July 2013
- Etymology: Corruption of Native American word "Tankamochkhanna" meaning "Little Beaver Stream"
- Location of Tamaqua in Schuylkill County, Pennsylvania (left) and of Schuylkill County in Pennsylvania (right)

- Location of Tamaqua in Pennsylvania Tamaqua (the United States)
- Coordinates: 40°47′55″N 75°57′59″W
- Country: United States
- State: Pennsylvania
- County: Schuylkill
- Incorporated: 1832

Government
  - Mayor: Nathan Gerace (R)

Area
  - Total: 9.72 sq mi (25.17 km^{2})
  - Land: 9.56 sq mi (24.77 km^{2})
  - Water: 0.15 sq mi (0.40 km^{2})
- Elevation: 870 ft (270 m)

Population (2020)
  - Total: 6,916 ▲
  - Estimate (2021): 6,932
  - Density: 696.9/sq mi (269.07/km^{2})
- Demonym: Tamaquan
- Time zone: UTC-5 (EST)
  - Summer (DST): UTC-4 (EDT)
- ZIP Code: 18252
- Area codes: 570 and 272
- FIPS code: 42-76032
- School district: Tamaqua Area

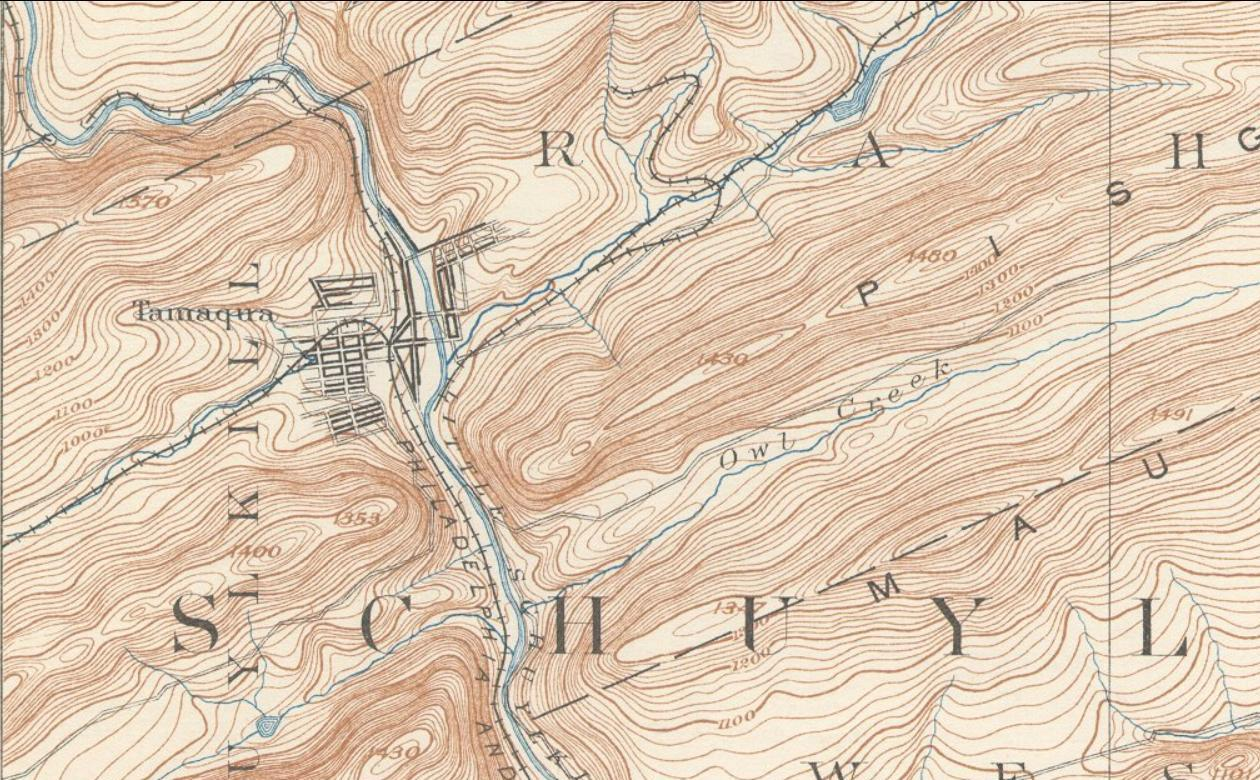
Map showing Tamaqua at the confluence of the Schuylkill River with Tamaqua Gap, which separates Nesquehoning Mountain to the east and Sharp Mountain across the gap to the west

Tamaqua (/təˈmɑːkwə/, Delaware: tëmakwe) is a borough in eastern Schuylkill County in the Coal Region of Pennsylvania, United States. It had a population of 6,934 as of the 2020 U.S. census.

Tamaqua was established from territory from West Penn and Schuylkill Townships. The borough is part of the micropolitan statistical area of Pottsville.

Tamaqua is located 37.8 miles (60.8 km) northwest of Allentown, 87 miles (140 km) northwest of Philadelphia, and 125.5 miles (202.0 km) west of New York City.

== History ==
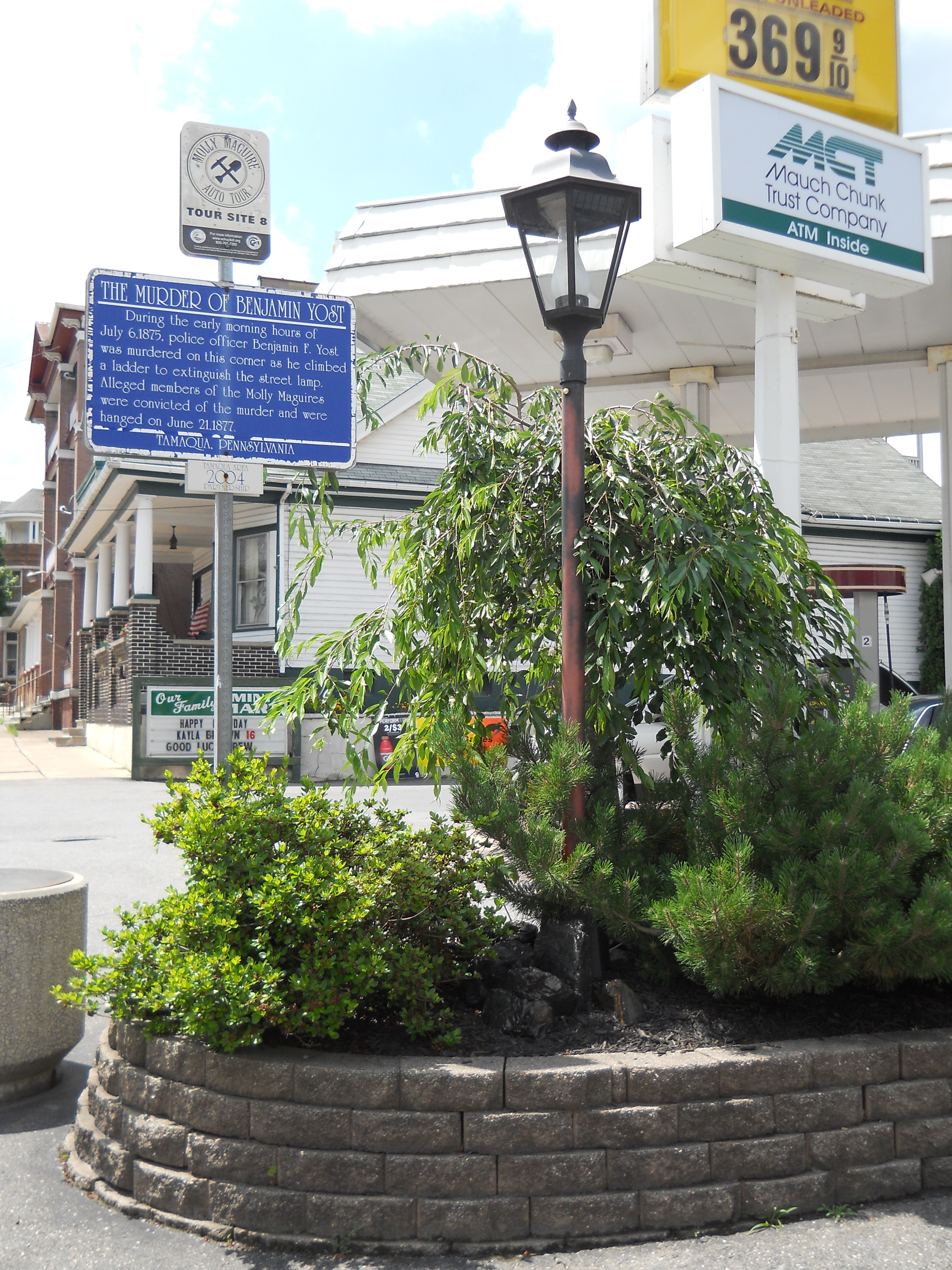
The Benjamin F. Yost Memorial in Tamaqua, honoring Benjamin Yost, a Tamaqua policeman assassinated in the Molly Maguires attacks on July 6, 1875

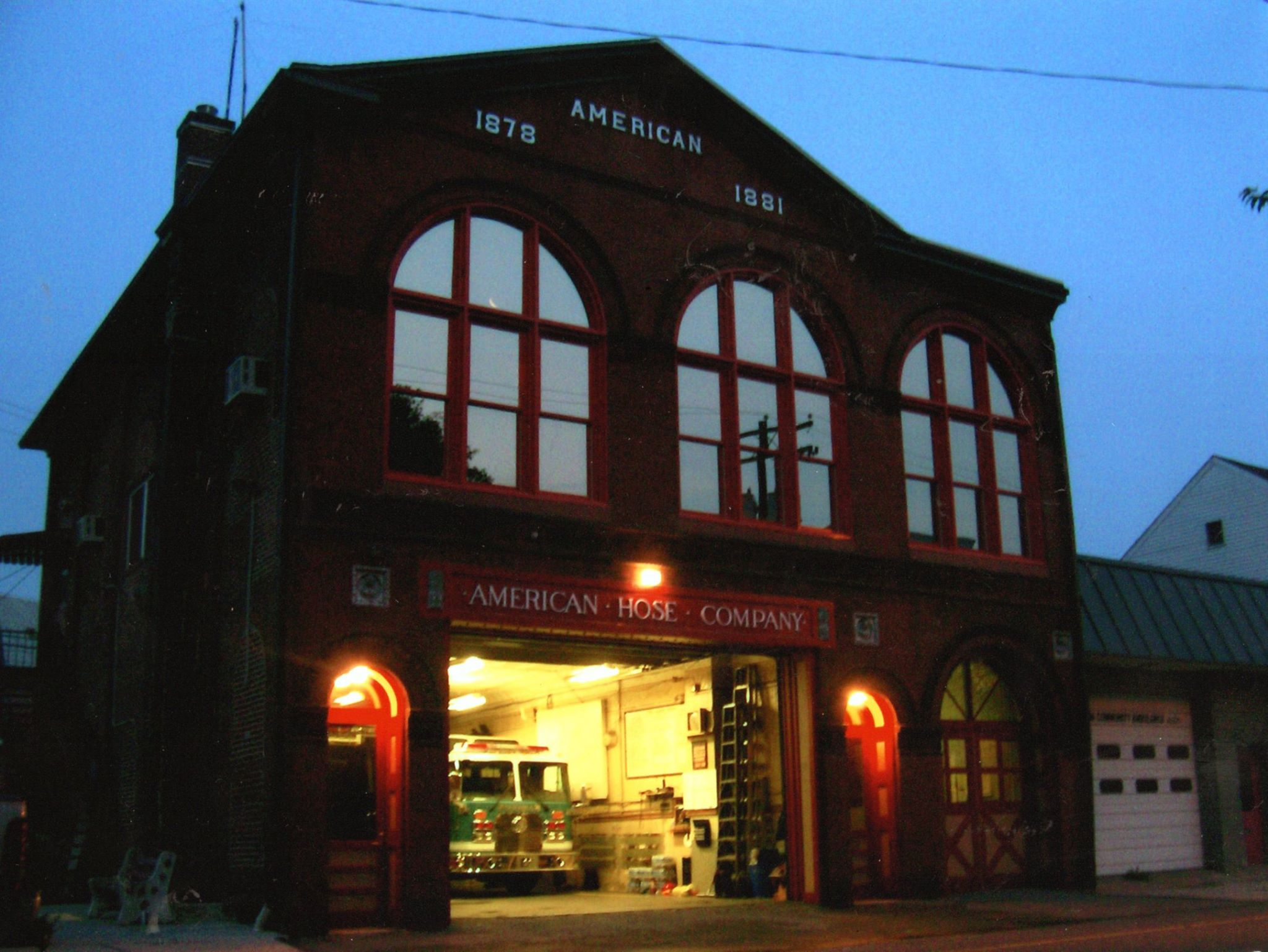
The American Hose Fire Company at night in Tamaqua in August 2012

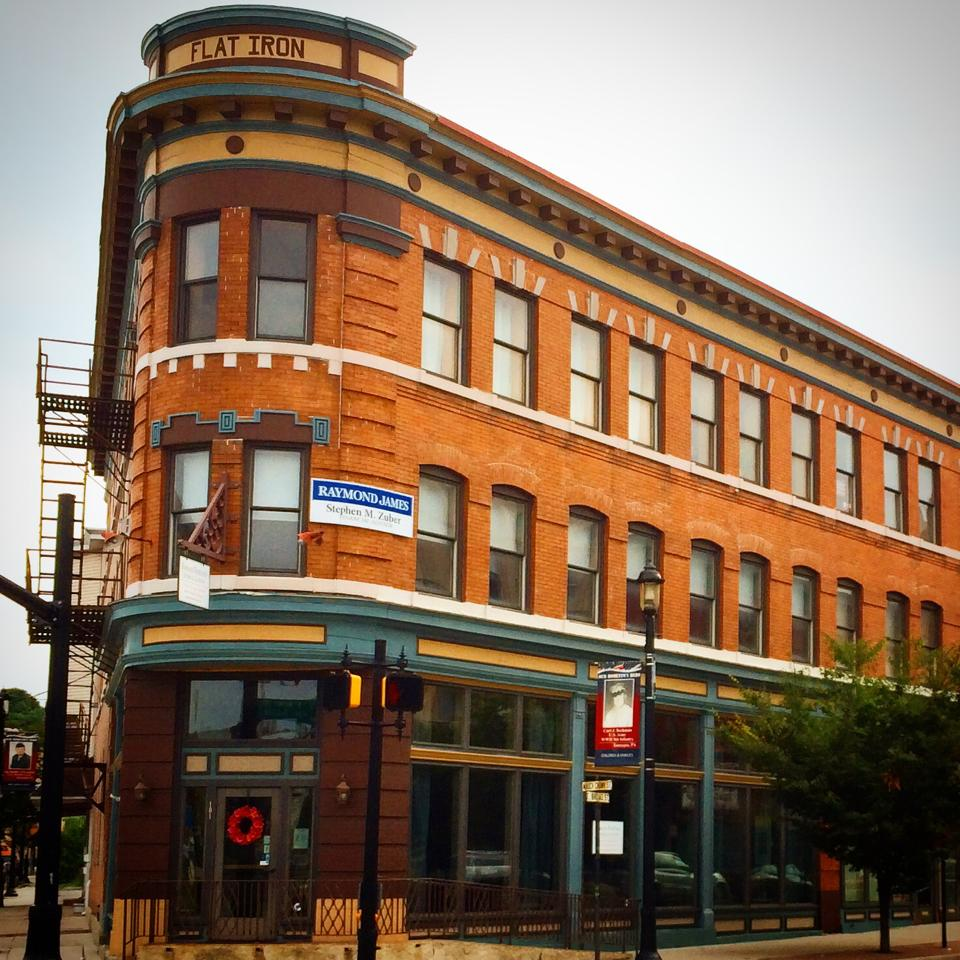
The Flat Iron Building in Tamaqua in September 2014

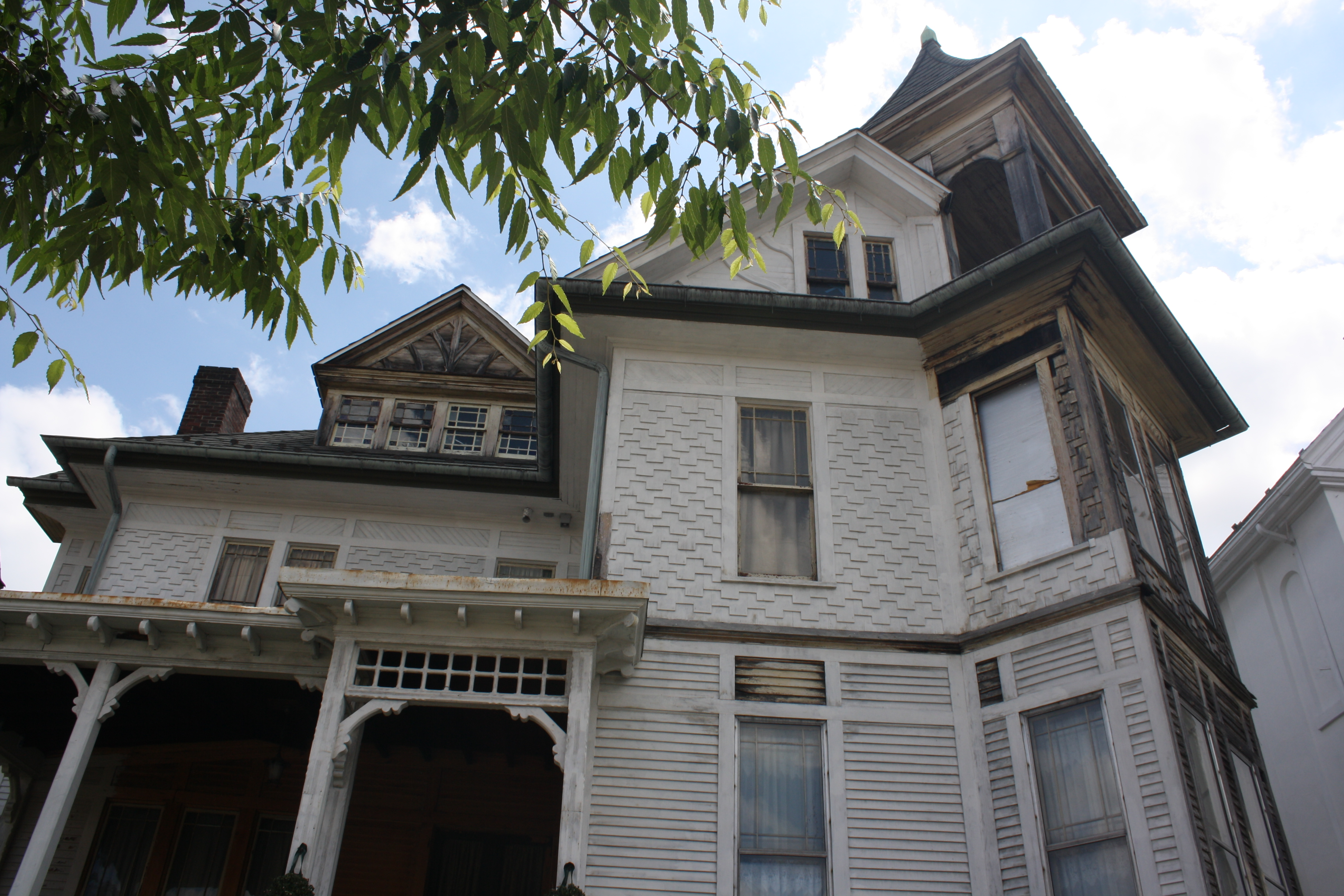
George Ormrod House, built in 1870 in Tamaqua, was added to the National Register of Historic Places in 1977.

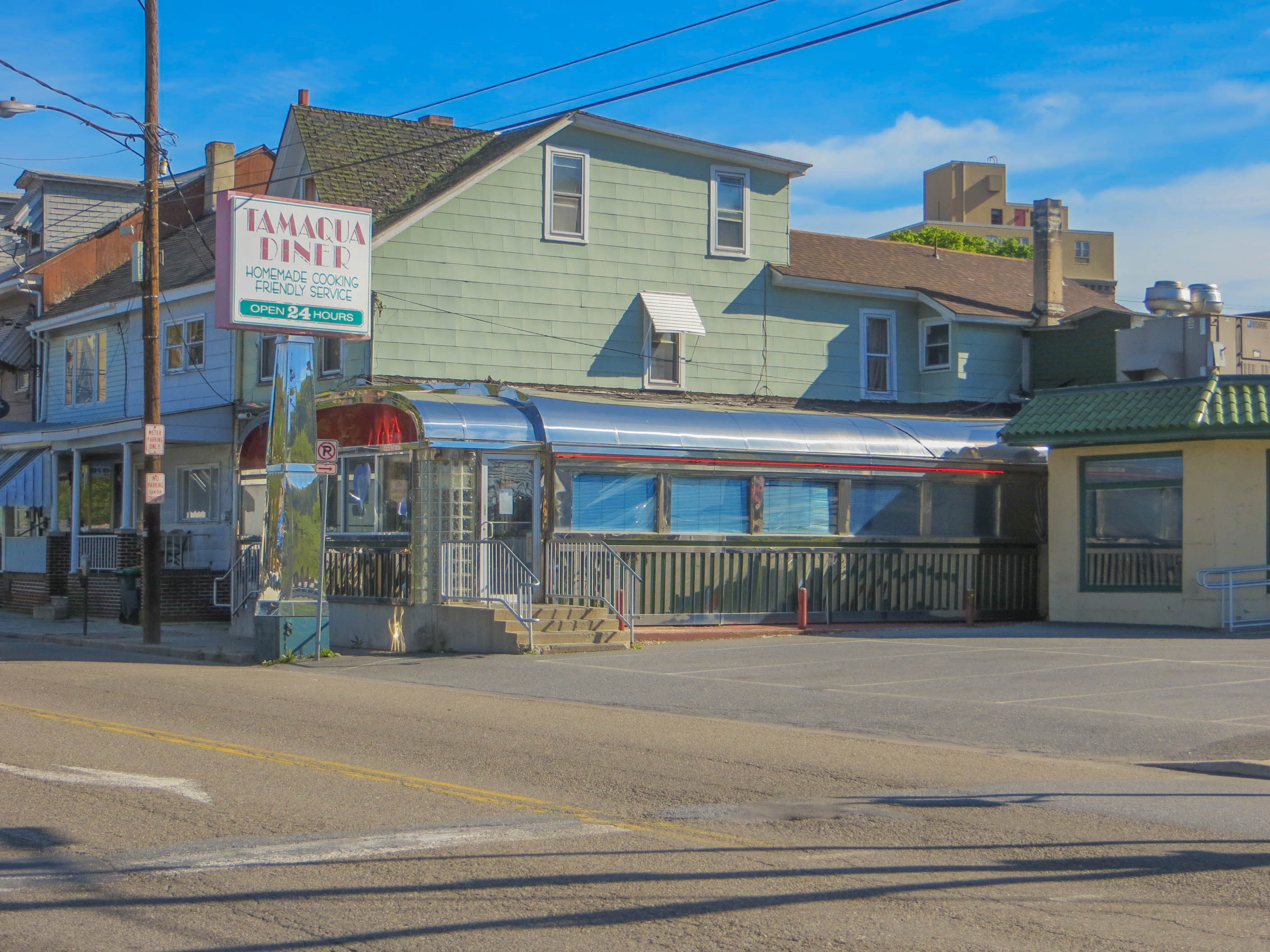
Tamaqua Diner in Tamaqua in May 2017

=== 18th century ===
Tamaqua was settled in 1799 by Burkhardt Moser, his son Jacob (born 1790), and John Kershner, who built shelters and a sawmill at the confluence of the Little Schuylkill River and Panther Creek, which is downtown Tamaqua today.

According to property records, Moser had a partner named Houser, and together they owned 2,000 acres (810 ha) which Moser homesteaded. Moser built a log house at the base of Dutch Hill in 1801 for Mrs. Catherine Moser, who was the first adult to die and receive burial there on February 15, 1822 followed later in April that year by John Kershner.

=== 19th century ===
The borough was originally to be named Tuscarora, but the name Tamaqua was chosen after it was realized that there already was a community named Tuscarora about four miles (6 km) to the west. The editor of The History of Schuylkill County wrote in 1881:

The town was laid out from parts of West Penn and Schuylkill townships in 1829, at which time the population was about 150. The design was to name it Tuscarora, but some enterprising person arose too early in the morning for the pioneers and gave that Indian name to the village four miles west. As the waters of the Tamaqua, rechristened Wabash, the west branch of the Little Schuylkill, passed through the tract, it was decided to name the infant with the name of the creek, Tamaqua, which is Indian for "running water".

— R. Steffy (editor), History of Schuylkill County, Pa.

The editor writes the following about Tamaqua's founding:

Mr. Moser was an industrious man, clearing the forest around his mill and laying out a farm, never dreaming that beneath his fields lay the great seams of coal, the mining of which was in future years to open employment to tens of thousands. February 15th, 1822, Catherine Moser died. This was the first death of an adult person in the place. In April of the same year John Kershner passed away.

The first business relied upon to support the infant town was agriculture, which, with the manufacture of lumber, was the principal industry for twenty years. For this purpose the elevated sloping land east of the borough, as well as that upon the immediate north, was chosen by Moser.

In 1817, anthracite coal was discovered by Berkhard Moser and his son Jacob. For a number of years the quantity mined, consumed, and marketed was very inconsiderable; first sales being made to blacksmiths, and some was taken over the Blue mountains in sacks and sold at seven to twelve cents per bushel. Sales increased until in 1832, when the record first begins, they amounted to 14,000 tons.

Greenwood was the spot of the first discovery, and the last coal mined at Tamaqua was there, in 1874, when the extensive breakers were burned and the mines ruined, at a loss of $1,500,000. Up to 1874 Tamaqua alone had given to the markets 23,000 tons.

— R.Steffy (editor), History of Schuylkill County, Pa.

Roughly half of Moser's original log cabin is still intact and visible behind a house on the north side of East Broad Street. The discovery of anthracite coal in the region in the early 19th century led to Tamaqua's rise as a coal-producing community. The town was incorporated as a borough in 1832. The first coal breaker, called "The Greenwood" was built as noted in the quotation, at the site of the first mine at the lower end of the Panther Creek Valley. However, details about construction and development in Rahn Township and Coaldale on the county-line with sister-town Lansford from the same source history illustrate it was definitely not the first breaker in the valley. Lehigh Coal & Navigation Company, with 10,000 acres located between Mauch Chunk in present-day Jim Thorpe and Tamaqua, was known to have mine tailings in their lands in Coaldale. The Greenwood breaker in 1874, as noted in the above quote, was burned by the Molly Maguires in the labor troubles of that era.

Irish, Welsh, and German immigrants came to the borough in the 1840s and 1850s followed by a large influx of Italians, Lithuanians, Russians, Ukrainians, Slovaks, and Poles in the 1890s and early 20th century. During the 1860s and 1870s, Tamaqua also was the geographic center hub for the Molly Maguires. One murder commonly attributed to the Mollies was that of town policeman Benjamin Yost, who was shot to death early one morning while extinguishing a gas lamp at the corner of West Broad and Lehigh Streets.

The Tamaqua Railroad station was constructed in 1874. It stood idle from the mid 1980s through the late 1990s after passenger railroad service to the town was discontinued. Initially planned to be demolished in the late 1980s, the non-profit group Save Our Station (S.O.S.) eventually managed to raise enough money to have it refurbished at a cost of $1.5 million. The station reopened in August 2004 and is now home to a full-service restaurant and gift shop. Rail excursions leave from there during the Tamaqua Historical Society's annual Heritage Festival on the second Sunday in October.

==== Hotels ====
The first tavern in Tamaqua was opened around 1807 in Berkhard Moser's house by the widow of John Kershner and her son-in-law, Isaac Bennett. In 1827, the Little Schuylkill Company, aspiring to draw the center of population to Dutch Hill, built the first stone building and hotel in Tamaqua. The house was converted into a dwelling thirty years afterward.

In 1832, James Taggart, one of the pioneers in Panther Creek Valley, came to Tamaqua and opened a hotel. Michael Beard took possession in 1846. The White Swan Inn (now Mundy’s Pub) was established in the early 1840s and is located at the corner of Cedar and South Greenwood streets. Between 1845 and 1847, the United States Hotel was built by the Little Schuylkill Company and was first kept by Joseph Haughawout. In 1850, the Washington House, on Pine Street, was built, and the American and Mansion on Centre Street at a later period.

==== Literary societies and lyceums ====
In 1853, Tamaqua had a public library and debating clubs discussed current events in the first town hall or schoolhouse as early as 1845. In 1856, the Tamaqua Lyceum was organized; it held weekly sessions in the south ward school building. Matthew Newkirk of Philadelphia contributed 1,500 books to it, which passed into the hands of the Perseverance Fire Company when the society later disbanded. No records of the first organization remain. The principal citizens were members.

On November 26, 1876, a group of men formed the Presbyterian Social and Literary Institute.

==== Cemeteries ====
The first graveyard was laid out in 1831 on Dutch Hill. The Catholic and Methodist burying grounds were laid out about 1837. The 30-acre Odd Fellows' cemetery, which opened in 1865 and is overseen by Harmony Lodge of Odd Fellows, is located at the western end of Broad Street. It is one of only two elaborate Victorian garden cemeteries in Schuylkill County. Zion's cemetery was opened in 1876.

=== 20th century ===
Tamaqua remained a thriving community throughout the heyday of coal production in the United States through the early 20th century. Certain sections of the borough, such as Dutch Hill and the South Ward, had a reputation for "toughness." Those sections were also densely populated by immigrants from southern and eastern Europe. However, in the 1950s, as coal mining began tapering off, Tamaqua and other Coal Region communities built on anthracite began declining.

In 1955. Hurricane Diane caused tremendous damage to Tamaqua's railroad yards, and they never fully recovered. In 1971, the borough annexed neighboring Rahn Township and its Owl Creek section, home to the world's first fish hatchery.

In 1945, John E. Morgan established a knitwear manufacturing industry in Hometown, two miles north of Tamaqua. The company, Morgan Knitting Mills, Inc., grew into the second-largest employer in the area behind Atlas Powder Company.

In the mid 1950s, Morgan, working from a design developed by his wife, Anna Hoban Morgan, patented the widely known thermal underwear product lines. Since Morgan's death in 2000, the Morgan Trust has donated money to various causes in the Tamaqua area and established the John & Dorothy Morgan Cancer Center at Lehigh Valley Hospital–Cedar Crest in Allentown.

Dial telephone service arrived in Tamaqua on August 6, 1961. The borough uses area codes 570 and 272. Operators who worked the 12-position switchboard on the top floor of the Tamaqua National Bank at West Broad and Berwick Streets were transferred to Bell Telephone toll centers in either Hazleton or Pottsville.

The 55-block Tamaqua Historic District, Anthracite Bank Building, George Ormrod House, and Tamaqua station have each been named to the National Register of Historic Places.

=== 21st century ===
In 2007, the borough of Tamaqua passed an unprecedented law giving ecosystems legal rights. The ordinance establishes that the municipal government or any Tamaqua resident can file a lawsuit on behalf of the local ecosystem. Other townships, such as Rush, followed suit and passed their own laws.

== Geography ==
Tamaqua is located in a valley basin at 40°47′55″N 75°57′59″W (40.798600, −75.966498) in Pennsylvania's southern Coal Region section of the Appalachian Mountains in the Schuylkill River drainage basin. Tamaqua's valley is located at the western end of the Pocono Mountains on the edge of the neighboring Lehigh River watershed. Tamaqua's terrain is typical of many mid-size Ridge-and-Valley Appalachians with low lands and flat towns with business, rail transport, and industries in its lower valley locations and residential dwellings on the higher elevated slopes above.

According to the U.S. Census Bureau, the borough has a total area of 10.0 square miles (26 km^{2}), of which 9.8 square miles (25 km^{2}) is land and 0.1 square miles (0.26 km^{2}) (1.31%) is water. Three streams pass through Tamaqua: The Little Schuylkill River runs through Tamaqua from the north through the gap separating the folds of Sharp Mountain on the west and Nesquehoning Mountain. Panther Creek flows southwest from Lansford, five miles away, and joins the Little Schuylkill River in Tamaqua. Wabash Creek joins the Little Schuylkill from the west.

In the Tamaqua area, coal mining was a vital economic activity throughout the 20th century, but more recent diminished use of coal as a power plant fuel and the demise of steam powered traction, coal has since experienced a decline. Tamaqua also gained recognition as a railroad center. In 1885, the Edison Illuminating Company in Tamaqua furnished the town with the nation's second incandescent municipal lighting system, a feat accomplished by the innovation of Thomas Edison.

The nearest city to Tamaqua is Hazleton, which is 12.5 miles north. Tamaqua is 15 miles (24 km) east of Pottsville, 14 miles (23 km) southwest of Jim Thorpe, approximately 60 miles (97 km) south of Scranton, approximately 95 miles (153 km) northwest of Philadelphia, and approximately 100 miles (160 km) southwest of New York City.

Tamaqua's average elevation is 870 feet (270 m) above sea level, but elevations can reach up to 1,000 feet (300 m) above sea level.

The borough has a warm-summer humid continental climate (Dfb) and the hardiness zone is 6a. Average monthly temperatures range from 26.0 °F in January to 71.0 °F in July.

== Transportation ==
=== Roads and highways ===
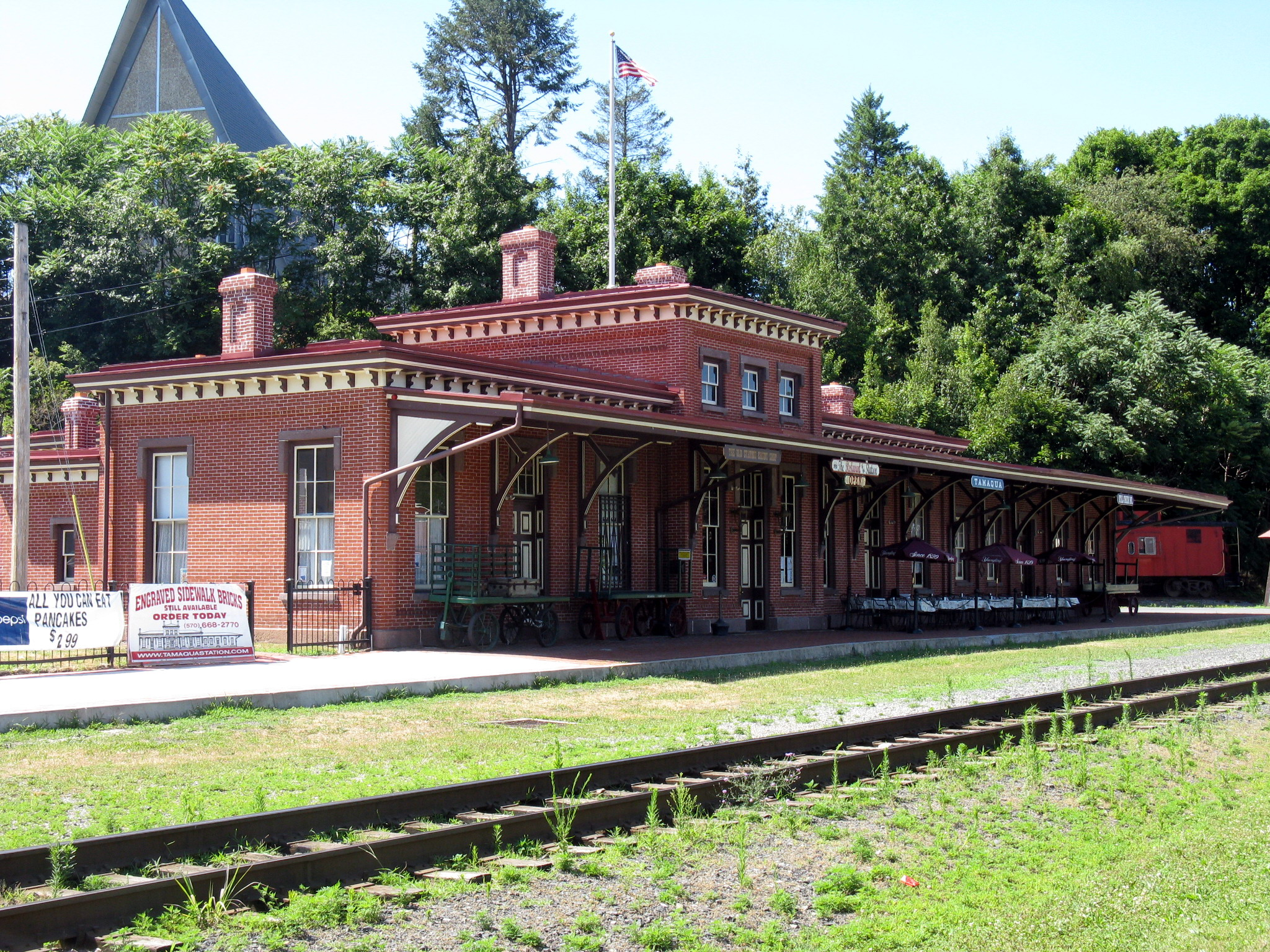
Tamaqua station in July 2010

The main highway in Tamaqua is Pennsylvania Route 309, which connects it with Allentown and Philadelphia to its south and Hazleton and Wilkes-Barre to its north, where it continues as PA Route 29 to the New York state line. Route 309 serves as a truck bypass for Interstate 476 since many placarded trucks are not allowed in the Lehigh Tunnel and as a route of choice for access to the region's operating coal mines and industrial parks. A second highway in the borough, U.S. Route 209, runs along Panther Creek and intersects with Route 309 in the borough. Route 209 runs for approximately 212 miles from Millersburg in Dauphin County to Ulster in Ulster County, New York. U.S. 209 also connects Tamaqua to nearby municipalities, including the Schuylkill County seat at Pottsville in the west and both Jim Thorpe and Lehighton to the east.

Other highways near Tamaqua include Pennsylvania Route 54, Pennsylvania Route 443, Pennsylvania Route 895, and Pennsylvania Route 902, most of which connect the Tamaqua area to the Poconos, the Lehigh Valley, and South Central Pennsylvania. In addition, Interstates 81, 80, 476, and 78 are near the town. Bus service is provided by Schuylkill Transportation System, Route 45 (Pottsville-McAdoo), and Fullington Trailways (intercity).

=== Railroads ===
Until the late 1960s, Tamaqua was a hub for two major railroads, the Reading Railroad (RDG) and Lehigh and New England Railroad (LNE). A large rail yard existed in the southern part of town that extended through downtown with, at one point, eight tracks passing by the passenger station. An engine house, turntable, and car shop were located across the street from the passenger station in what is now the St. Luke's Medical Center parking lot. The collapse of the anthracite coal industry in the early 1960s, the Penn Central merger, and Hurricane Agnes in 1972 all led to the railroad's demise. Today, all that remains is a single track line through town operated by the Reading Blue Mountain and Northern Railroad.

Tamaqua has a small rail yard, but its switching and geography makes it an important junction with tracks along both the Little Schuylkill River and others penetrating near the west-flowing Panther Creek and north into Hazleton. The town once hosted trackage of the Reading Railroad and the Lehigh Valley and New England Railroads.

== Demographics ==
Historical population
Census	Pop.	Note	%±
1840	465		—
1850	3,080		562.4%
1860	4,919		59.7%
1870	5,960		21.2%
1880	5,730		−3.9%
1890	6,054		5.7%
1900	7,267		20.0%
1910	9,462		30.2%
1920	12,363		30.7%
1930	12,936		4.6%
1940	12,486		−3.5%
1950	11,508		−7.8%
1960	10,173		−11.6%
1970	9,246		−9.1%
1980	8,843		−4.4%
1990	7,943		−10.2%
2000	7,124		−10.3%
2010	7,107		−0.2%
2020	6,916		−2.7%
2021 (est.)	6,932	▲	0.2%

As of the 2000 census, there were 7,174 people, 3,179 households, and 1,901 families residing in the borough. The population density was 729.9 inhabitants per square mile (281.8/km^{2}). There were 3,602 housing units at an average density of 366.5 per square mile (141.5/km^{2}). The racial makeup of the borough was 98.69% White, 0.18% African American, 0.08% Native American, 0.22% Asian, 0.25% from other races, and 0.57% from two or more races. Hispanic or Latino people of any race were 1.30% of the population.

There were 3,179 households, out of which 24.8% had children under the age of 18 living with them, 43.9% were married couples living together, 11.9% had a female householder with no husband present, and 40.2% were non-families. 35.9% of all households were made up of individuals, and 19.9% had someone living alone who was 65 years of age or older. The average household size was 2.25 and the average family size was 2.93.

The borough's population consisted of 21.8% under the age of 18, 6.9% from 18 to 24, 28.4% from 25 to 44, 21.7% from 45 to 64, and 21.2% who were 65 years of age or older. The median age was 40 years. For every 100 females, there were 92.0 males. For every 100 females age 18 and over, there were 87.2 males.

The median income for a household in the borough was $27,899, and the median income for a family was $36,406. Males had a median income of $29,970 versus $20,637 for females. The per capita income for the borough was $15,752. About 11.1% of families and 14.9% of the population were below the poverty line, including 24.1% of those under age 18 and 11.3% of those aged 65 or over.

== Media ==
Since June 14, 1965, Tamaqua has had an FM station, beginning as WSVB, later WZTA and WCRN, and now WMGH, commonly known as Magic 105.5. The Bill Angst Little League Field in Thomas Walsh Park is adjacent to the original studios and transmitting tower in the Dutch Hill section of the borough. The studios are now with co-owned WLSH (AM 1410), seven miles east of Tamaqua on Route 209 in Nesquehoning. The station's tower is in Tuscarora, 4.5 miles west of Tamaqua on Locust Mountain.

Tamaqua is located in the Scranton media market and receives television signals primarily from that area. Depending on cable providers, it is possible to receive signals from Philadelphia and New York City, since Tamaqua lies on the boundary line of the two markets. The main television stations broadcasting to Tamaqua are:

- WNEP-TV, an ABC affiliate in Scranton
- WBRE-TV, an NBC affiliate in Wilkes-Barre
- WVIA-TV, a PBS member station in Scranton
- WLVT-TV, a PBS member station in Bethlehem (licensed to Allentown)
- WOLF-TV, a FOX affiliate in Plains (licensed to Hazleton)
- WFMZ-TV, an independent station in Allentown
- WYOU-TV, a CBS affiliate in Wilkes-Barre (licensed to Scranton)
- WYLN-LP, an independent station in Hazleton

Tamaqua receives broadcasts of The CW from New York City (WPIX-TV) and Wilkes-Barre (WSWB-TV).

== Churches ==
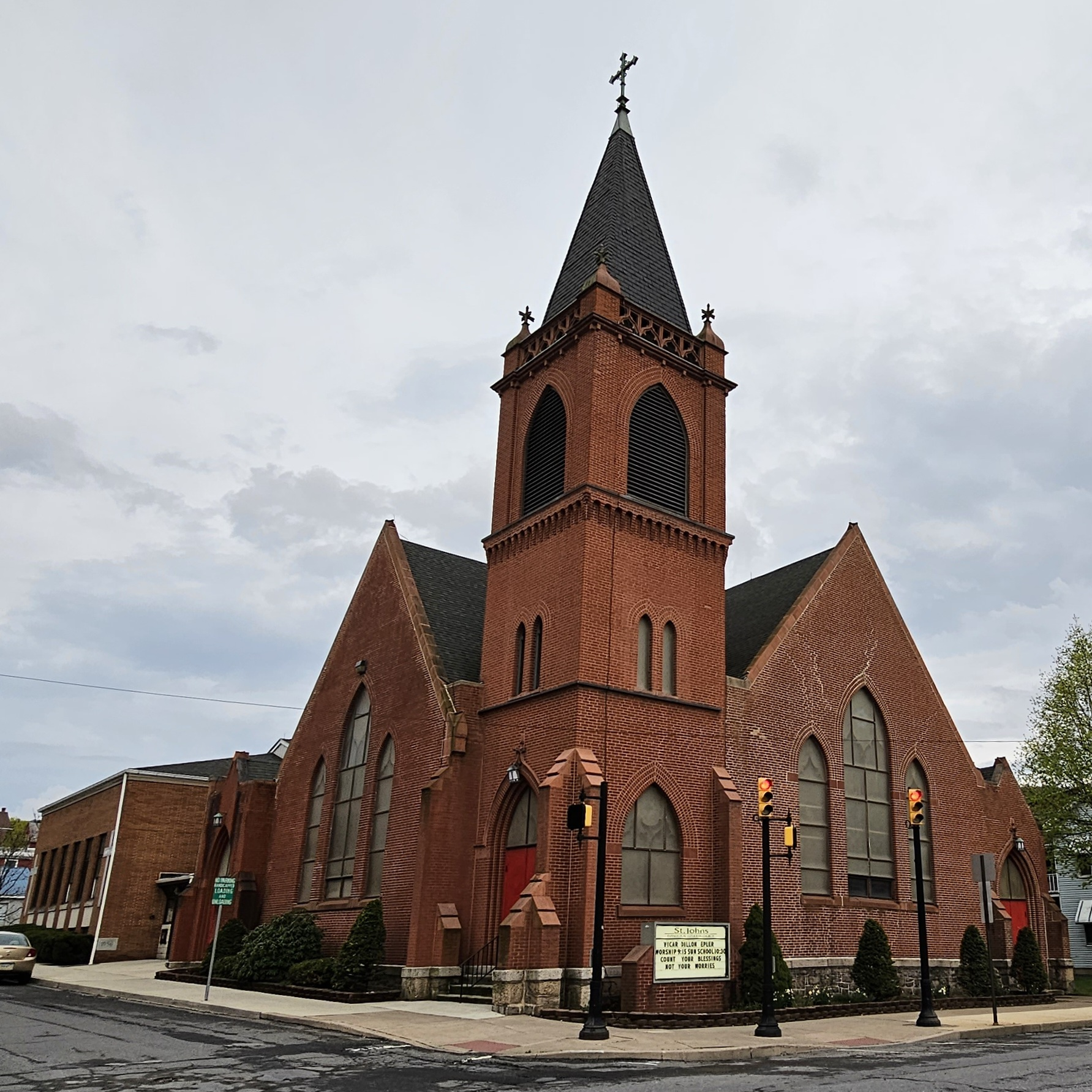
St. John's Evangelical Lutheran Church in Tamaqua

- Bethany E.C Church
- Bethany Evangelical Congregational
- Calvary Episcopal Church
- Primitive Methodist Church
- First United Methodist Church
- New England Valley Mennonite Church
- New Life Assembly of God
- St. John XXIII (formed in the 2010s as part of the consolidation of St Jerome (Broad Street) and SS Peter and Paul (Pine Street)
- St. John's Evangelical Lutheran
- St. John's United Church of Christ
- Trinity United Church of Christ
- Zion Evangelical Lutheran

== Education ==
=== Primary education ===
Students in Tamaqua attend schools in the Tamaqua Area School District, which includes seven schools, five public and two private, located within the geographic area of the district:

- Tamaqua Area Senior High School – grades 9–12
- Tamaqua Area Middle School – grades 6–8
- Tamaqua Area Elementary School – grades K–5
- Rush Elementary School – grades K-2
- St. Jerome Regional School – grades PreK – 8
- West Penn Elementary School – grades K-5
- Marian Catholic High School – grades 9–12

=== Colleges and universities ===
Tamaqua is home to the Morgan Center branch of the Lehigh Carbon Community College (LCCC), a community college based in Schnecksville, Pennsylvania.

=== Events ===
- Tamaqua hosts Playa del Fuego, a twice-annual event organized on the model of Burning Man. The spring event is held over Memorial Day weekend and the fall event is held over Columbus Day weekend.

== Notable people ==
- Frank M. Allen (1923–1999), former Pennsylvania State House of Representatives member
- Henry Aurand (1894–1980), former lieutenant general and commanding general, United States Army, Pacific (CG USArPac)
- Charles Justin Bailey (1859–1946), former major general in U.S. Army who commanded 81st Infantry Division during World War I
- Kimberly Bergalis (1968–1991), infected by her dentist in Fort Pierce, Florida, bringing national attention to need for HIV testing for health care workers
- Henry L. Cake (1827–1899), commander of 96th Regiment, Pennsylvania Volunteers (1861–1863) and U.S. congressman
- Chris Fulmer (1858–1931), former professional baseball player, Baltimore Orioles and Washington Nationals
- Frank E. Graeff (1860–1919), Methodist Episcopal Church hymn writer and author
- Lydia Holman (1868–1960), nurse who served in the Spanish-American War
- William Klingaman, Sr. (1916–1991), former Pennsylvania State House of Representatives member
- Paul H. Knepper (1917–1989), aircraft engineer and designer who built the Crusader, a two-seat airplane
- Jerry Knowles (1948–), Pennsylvania State House of Representatives member
- Jacob Kulick (1992), recording artist, singer, songwriter, multi-instrumentalist, record producer, and audio engineer
- Sean Love (1968–), former professional football player, Carolina Panthers and Tampa Bay Buccaneers
- G. Raymond Nye (1889–1965), actor of the silent era who appeared in over 100 films
- Maxine Reiner (1916–2003), actress
- Megan Valentine, professor of mechanical engineering, University of California, Santa Barbara
- Paul L. Wagner (1897–1991), former Pennsylvania state senator

== In popular culture ==
In the fiction writings of John O'Hara, a short story writer born in Pottsville, Pennsylvania, he references Tamaqua as "Taqua."
