= Shostak =

Shostak (England); Szostak (Poland) is an Eastern European noble surname, historically attested in the territories of the former Grand Duchy of Lithuania.

The surname is primarily found in Poland, Lithuania, Ukraine and Belarus and has also spread to countries such as Russia, Israel, and the United States due to emigration.

== Known people ==
- Aleksandr Shostak (born 1974), Belarusian gymnast
- Aliaksei Shostak (born 1995), Belarusian-born American trampoline gymnast
- Arthur B. Shostak (born 1937), American sociologist and futurist
- Dean Shostak, American musician
- Eliezer Shostak (1911–2001), Israeli politician
- Frank Shostak, Austrian economist
- Hanna Sobachko-Shostak (1883–1965), Ukrainian folk painter
- John Shostak (died 1971), American politician
- Konstantin Shostak (born 2000), Belarusian ice hockey player
- Marjorie Shostak (1945–1996), American anthropologist
- Robert Shostak, American computer scientist
- Seth Shostak (born 1943), American astronomer

== See also ==
- Shostakovich, Szostkiewicz
- Shestakov, Shostakov
- Szostak, Polish form
- Šesták/Shestak
- Seszták
