= Shestak =

Shestak (Шестак) is a Russian and a Ukrainian surname derived from the nickname shestak meaning "sixth child" or from the name of the coin (Belarusian: шастак, Polish: szóstak, Russian: шостак) denotes a six groschen, originally issued in the Grand Duchy of Lithuania, as well as an English transcription of the Czech surname "Šesták". Notable people with the name include:

- Iurii Shestak (born 1993), Ukrainian boxer
- Nadiya Shestak (born 1962), Ukrainian singer, People's Artist of Ukraine

== See also ==
- Šesták, Seszták
- Shostak, Szostak
- Shestakov, Shostakov
