= Mahanoy Area School District v. B.L. =

U.S. Supreme Court case on student speech off-campus on social media

Coordinates: 40.8130°N 76.1404°W

- Supreme Court of the United States

Argued April 28, 2021 Decided June 23, 2021
- Full case name: Mahanoy Area School District v. B.L., A Minor, By And Through Her Father Lawrence Levy And Her Mother Betty Lou Levy
- Docket no.: 20-255
- Citations: 594 U.S. 180 (more)
- Argument: Oral argument

Case history
- Prior: Preliminary injunction granted to plaintiff, B.L. v. Mahanoy Area School District, 289 F. Supp. 3d 607 (M.D. Pa., 2017); Summary judgment granted in favor of plaintiff, B.L. v. Mahanoy Area Sch. Dist., 376 F. Supp. 3d 429 (M.D. Pa. 2019); Affirmed, 964 F.3d 170 (3d Cir. 2020); Cert. granted, No. 20-255, 2021 WL 77251 (U.S. Jan. 8, 2021)

Questions presented
- Whether Tinker v. Des Moines Independent Community School District, 393 U.S. 503 (1969), which holds that public school officials may regulate speech that would materially and substantially disrupt the work and discipline of the school, applies to student speech that occurs off campus.

Holding
- While public schools may have a special interest in regulating some off-campus student speech, the special interests offered by the school are not sufficient to overcome B. L.’s interest in free expression in this case.

Court membership
- Chief Justice John Roberts Associate Justices Clarence Thomas · Stephen Breyer; Samuel Alito · Sonia Sotomayor; Elena Kagan · Neil Gorsuch; Brett Kavanaugh · Amy Coney Barrett

Case opinions
- Majority: Breyer, joined by Roberts, Alito, Sotomayor, Kagan, Gorsuch, Kavanaugh, Barrett
- Concurrence: Alito, joined by Gorsuch
- Dissent: Thomas

Laws applied
- U.S. Const. amends. I, XIV

Mahanoy Area School District v. B.L., 594 U.S. 180 (2021) was a United States Supreme Court case involving the ability of schools to regulate student speech made off-campus, including speech made on social media. The case challenged past interpretations of Tinker v. Des Moines Independent Community School District and Bethel School District v. Fraser – previous Supreme Court decisions related to student speech which may be disruptive to the educational environment – in light of online communications.

The case centered on Brandi Levy (initially identified as "B.L." in court documents (Note: At the time that the lawsuit was filed, Levy was a minor; legal files listed her as B.L. to protect her identity, with her parents as co-plaintiffs.)), a student at Mahanoy Area High School in Mahanoy City, Pennsylvania, who posted an angry, profane Snapchat message from an off-campus location after she failed to make the school's varsity cheerleading squad. Though sent to a private circle of friends and deleted later, the message was shown to school staff, and Levy was suspended from cheerleading for one year under the school's policy relating to social media.

The Supreme Court affirmed the Third Circuit's judgment in favor of Levy in an 8–1 decision in June 2021, though it did not agree with the Third Circuit's opinion related to off-campus speech relative to Tinker. The Court affirmed that through Tinker, schools may have a valid interest in regulating student speech off-campus that is disruptive, but did not define when this regulation can occur, leaving that issue open for lower courts in future litigation. The Supreme Court ruled specifically in favor of Levy, holding that the school's interests in preventing disruption under Tinker were not sufficient to overcome her First Amendment rights.

== Background ==
Brandi Levy was a ninth-grade student and junior varsity (JV) cheerleader at Mahanoy Area High School, a public secondary school operated by the Mahanoy Area School District, covering the area in and around Mahanoy City in Schuylkill County, Pennsylvania. In addition to cheering at football, basketball, and wrestling matches, her obligations as a cheerleader included raising additional funding for the squad from the community. As a condition of being a cheerleader, she was required to sign a code of conduct that required squad members to show respect for their teammates, coaches, the school, teachers, and other schools' cheerleaders; the rule also forbade the use of profanity. Another rule forbade cheerleaders from posting "negative information" about "cheerleading, cheerleaders or coaches" on the Internet. The code had been written by previous cheerleading coaches and approved by the school board.

Near the end of the 2016–17 academic year, Levy tried out for the next year's cheerleading squad. She hoped to make the varsity squad, but the two coaches, both teachers in the district, found her only good enough for the JV squad. An eighth-grader at the tryouts, meanwhile, made the varsity squad.

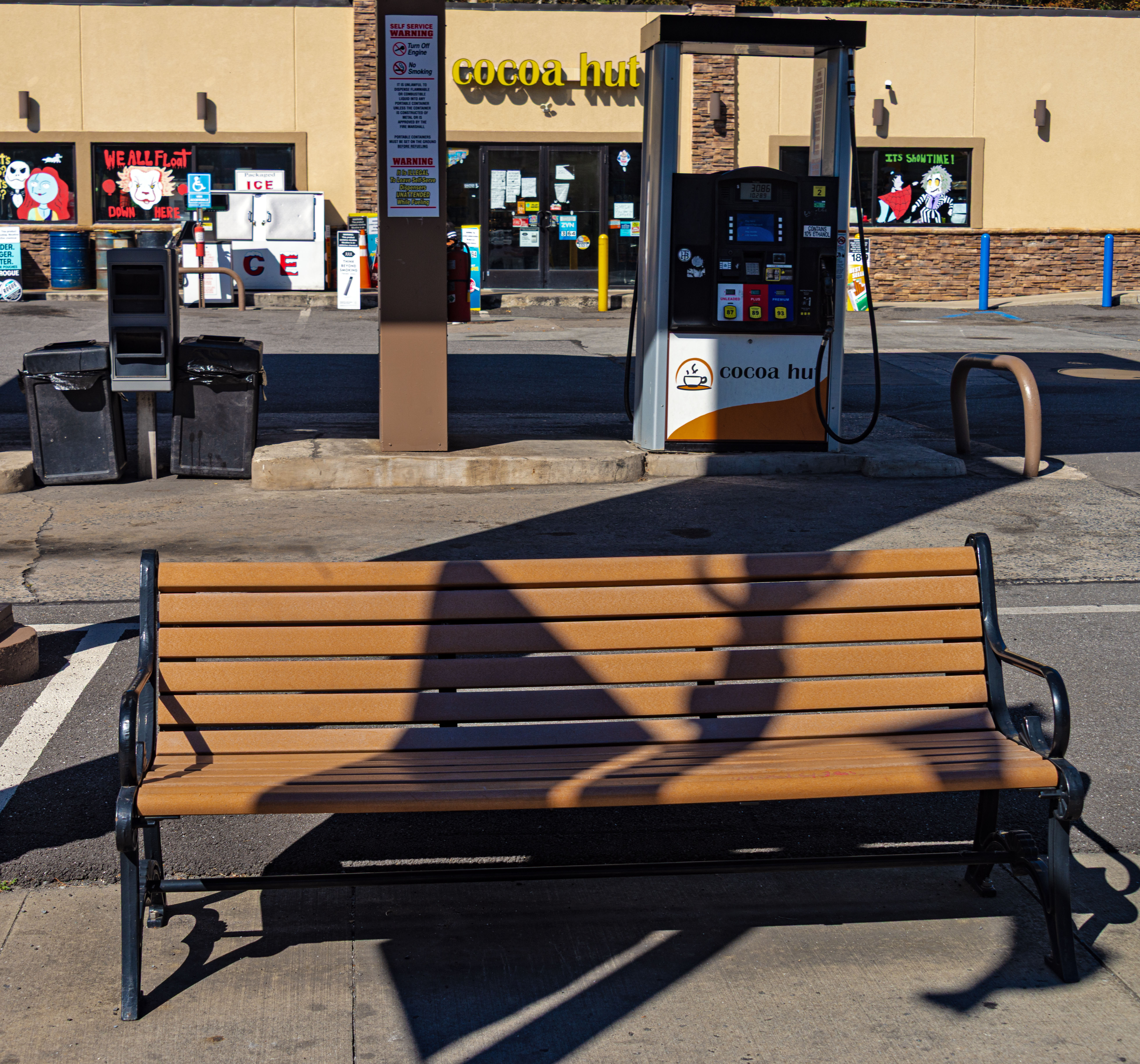
The bench in front of the Cocoa Hut where Levy sent her Snap from, seen in 2025

The following weekend, Levy and a friend commiserated about the apparent unfairness of this at the Cocoa Hut, a convenience store in downtown Mahanoy City where students often socialized. Using Levy's smartphone, the two took a selfie with middle fingers raised and posted it to her Snapchat account with the text "fuck school fuck softball fuck cheer fuck everything". A followup Snap expressed their frustration about being kept on the JV squad while the incoming freshman girl made the varsity squad; they believed they were being treated unfairly. Levy sent the two Snaps to a group of approximately 250 friends, many of whom were fellow students, and some of whom were cheerleaders themselves.

The Snap itself self-deleted in a short period of time, but one of Levy's teammates took a screenshot. One of those teammates was the daughter of one of the coaches, and had herself been suspended from cheering at a few games after she had posted disparaging remarks online about another school's cheerleading uniforms. By the time school resumed the following week, the screenshot had been widely shared among students, especially the cheerleaders. Some who had seen it came to the cheerleading coaches "visibly upset" by the Snap over the next few days. At the end of the week one of the coaches pulled Levy out of class to inform her that she was suspended from cheerleading for the next year as a result of her Snap. Levy's parents appealed the suspension to the school board, which upheld it.

== Lower courts ==
=== District Court for the Middle District of Pennsylvania ===
Levy, represented by her parents and supported by the American Civil Liberties Union, sued the school in federal court for the Middle District of Pennsylvania. Her attorney emphasized that her remarks were those of frustration made on her own social media account on her own time and contained neither threats nor any mention of the name of her school. In October 2017, four months after Levy was suspended from cheerleading, Judge A. Richard Caputo granted her a preliminary injunction that prohibited the school from enforcing the suspension. Caputo held that Levy would suffer irreparable harm without the injunction. "Simply put, the ability of a school to punish lewd or profane speech disappears once a student exits school grounds."

Caputo added that the school could not curb Levy's off-campus speech per Bethel School District v. Fraser and that the speech did not disrupt the school's operation per Tinker v. Des Moines Independent Community School District. He rejected the school district's arguments that Levy had waived her constitutional rights by joining the cheerleading squad based on previous case law, that it could not be liable for the coaches' actions since it had approved the code Levy had signed, and that she had no constitutional right to be a cheerleader. "The District's concession that Levy's speech occurred off-campus is all but fatal," the judge said, finding that Tinker and Fraser's exceptions did not apply as her speech was neither disruptive nor on-campus respectively. Caputo allowed that there were some other cases which allowed schools to impose greater speech limits on student athletes, but those did not come into play since Levy was not engaging in school-sponsored speech.

=== Third Circuit ===
The school district appealed Caputo's decision to the Third Circuit Court of Appeals. A three-judge panel acknowledged that "B.L.'s snap was crude, rude, and juvenile, just as we might expect of an adolescent," but upheld the district court's holding in her favor, again finding that both Tinker and Fraser did not support restricting her off-campus speech. Writing for the panel, Judge Cheryl Ann Krause agreed with Caputo that the speech had clearly been off-campus, thus punishing Levy for it violated her First Amendment rights. The school district appealed this ruling.

== Supreme Court of the United States ==
The school district petitioned the U.S. Supreme Court to take the case, arguing that particularly with the by-then ongoing COVID-19 pandemic, the nature of online communications required reevaluation of the distinction between on-campus versus off-campus speech in the context of distance learning. The Supreme Court granted certiorari.

Amicus curiae briefs supporting Levy arrived from free speech advocacy groups and religious groups such as the Alliance Defending Freedom, which expressed concern that a ruling favoring the school district could lead to prosecution of a student's religious beliefs. Those supporting the school district included anti-cyberbullying advocacy groups like the Cyberbullying Research Center, which believed that a ruling favoring the student would limit schools' ability to regulate and take action against cyberbullying. The federal government, under acting solicitor general Elizabeth Prelogar, urged the Supreme Court to find an intermediate position, by recognizing that while the court had previously ruled that off-campus speech cannot be regulated by a school, there are some types of student speech over which schools should have oversight when that speech threatens the school or targets individual members of the school.

=== Oral arguments ===
Oral arguments were heard on April 28, 2021. Reporters for the Associated Press and Reuters who observed the oral arguments stated that it was unclear if the court would accept the bright-line ruling of the Third Circuit, as they argued there were compelling reasons for the school to have authority over some types of off-campus speech made on social media. At the same time, the reporters stated that the Justices were also wary of giving schools too much oversight of off-campus speech because social media enables so much of that speech to enter the school environment, The Justices considered whether this case was an appropriate vehicle to define new bounds for protections related to student speech, arguing under Tinker that Levy's Snapchat post may simply not have been sufficiently disruptive to warrant disciplinary action by the school. Vox's Ian Millhiser stated that the Justices argued for a more narrow ruling than the case had appeared to originally merit and it was unlikely to become a landmark decision.

The New York Times reported that the Justices seemed sympathetic to Levy. Justice Stephen Breyer doubted that her Snap had been significantly disruptive to the school's operations, and that if it was, "my goodness, every school in the country would be doing nothing but punishing." Justice Brett Kavanaugh, a youth basketball coach himself, said the yearlong suspension seemed excessive, but reporter Adam Liptak believed that Kavanaugh would agree with the views of several other Justices when he said the court's opinion should not be a "treatise" and that "the First Amendment does not categorically prohibit public schools from disciplining students for speech that occurs off campus, period."

=== Decision ===
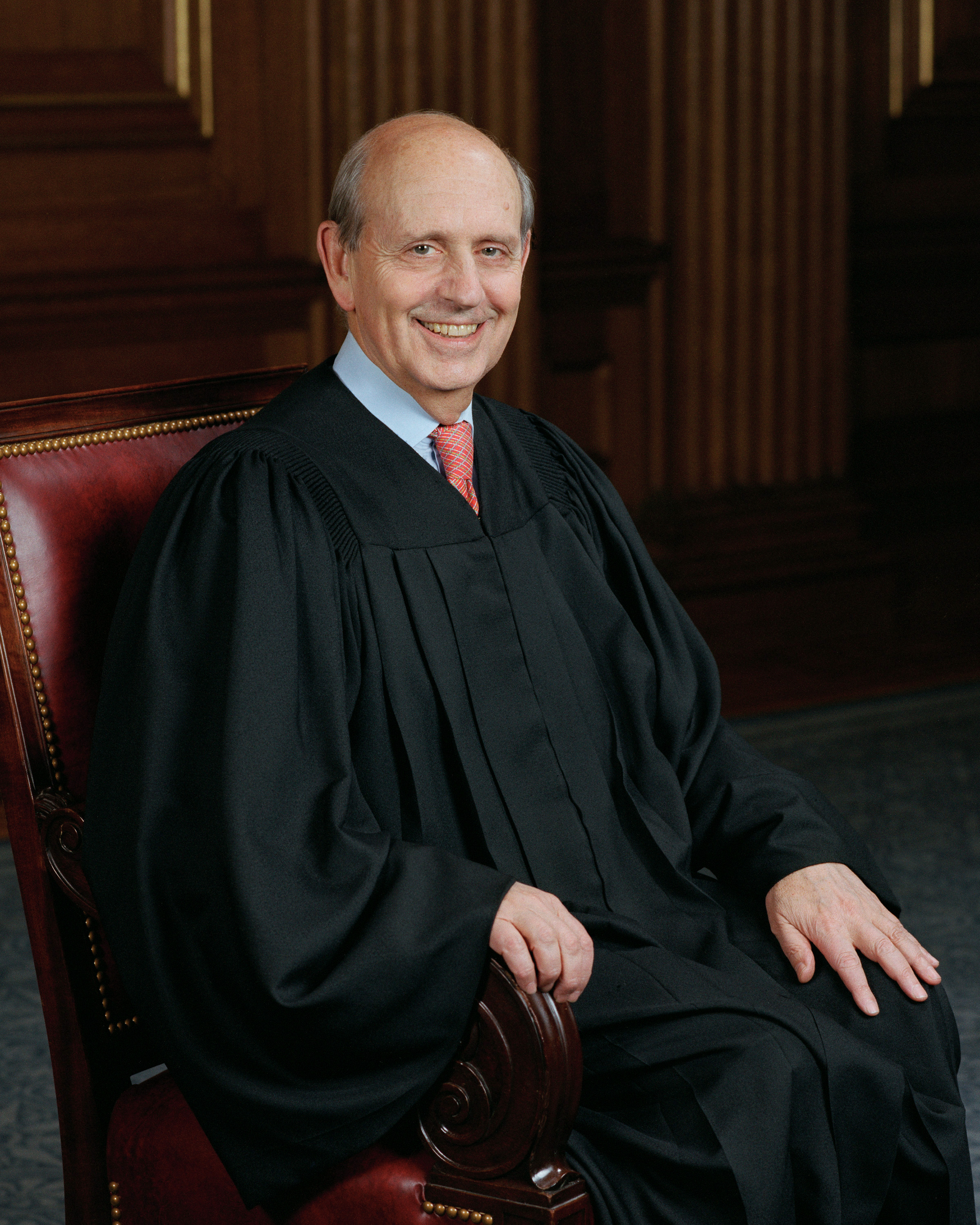
Justice Stephen Breyer, who wrote the majority opinion

The Supreme Court issued its decision on June 23, 2021, and affirmed the Third Circuit's ruling in an 8–1 judgement. The majority opinion was written by Justice Breyer, and overruled some of the Third Circuit's majority opinion in relationship to Tinker in that it was too broad towards off-campus speech, and that schools may have a legitimate interest in restricting off-campus speech, such as in relation to harassment and bullying. However, the majority did not try to define the bounds when this applies: "We do not now set forth a broad, highly general First Amendment rule stating just what counts as 'off campus' speech and whether or how ordinary First Amendment standards must give way off campus to a school’s special need to prevent… substantial disruption of learning-related activities or the protection of those who make up a school community."

Breyer identified three factors related to off-campus speech that should be considered in future litigation: that off-campus speech is usually the responsibility of the student's parents, that off-campus speech covers virtually any activity outside of the school facility, and that the school has a responsibility to protect unpopular ideas by students. Of the latter point, Breyer said "The school itself has an interest in protecting a student's unpopular expression, especially when the expression takes place off campus," because "America's public schools are the nurseries of democracy."

Turning specifically to Levy's case, Breyer wrote that while the school may have a valid interest in controlling student speech off-campus, the school district violated Levy's First Amendment rights in reprimanding her for her post. Breyer stated that if Levy had been an adult, her Snapchat post would have been protected by the First Amendment, and that there was no evidence that her post created the type of disruption that Tinker addressed. Other aspects of Levy's case worked in her favor, including the fact that her Snapchat message was sent to a private circle of friends, and that it did not explicitly name the school or target any individuals. Breyer wrote: "It might be tempting to dismiss (the student's) words as unworthy of the robust First Amendment protections discussed herein. But sometimes it is necessary to protect the superfluous in order to preserve the necessary."

Justice Samuel Alito wrote a concurring opinion opining that "there is a category of speech that is almost always beyond the regulatory authority of a public school. This is student speech that is not expressly and specifically directed at the school, school administrators, teachers, or fellow students and that addresses matters of public concern, including sensitive subjects like politics, religion, and social relations. Speech on such matters lies at the heart of the First Amendment's protection." He considered that a school that punished a student for speaking out against it would be attempting a "heckler's veto".

Justice Clarence Thomas, the lone dissenter, opined that the Tinker Court had never sufficiently explained how the First Amendment would have been understood as applying to student speech at the time the Fourteenth Amendment was ratified, and cited prior state cases from that period suggesting it was not; Thomas stated "a more searching review reveals that schools historically could discipline students in circumstances like those presented here." Thomas wrote "the majority fails to consider whether schools often will have more authority, not less, to discipline students who transmit speech through social media." He also wrote that the school should have been able to restrict Levy's speech as students "who are active in extracurricular programs have a greater potential, by virtue of their participation, to harm those programs."

== See also ==
- List of United States Supreme Court cases involving the First Amendment
