= John P. Morris =

American trade unionist (1926–2002)

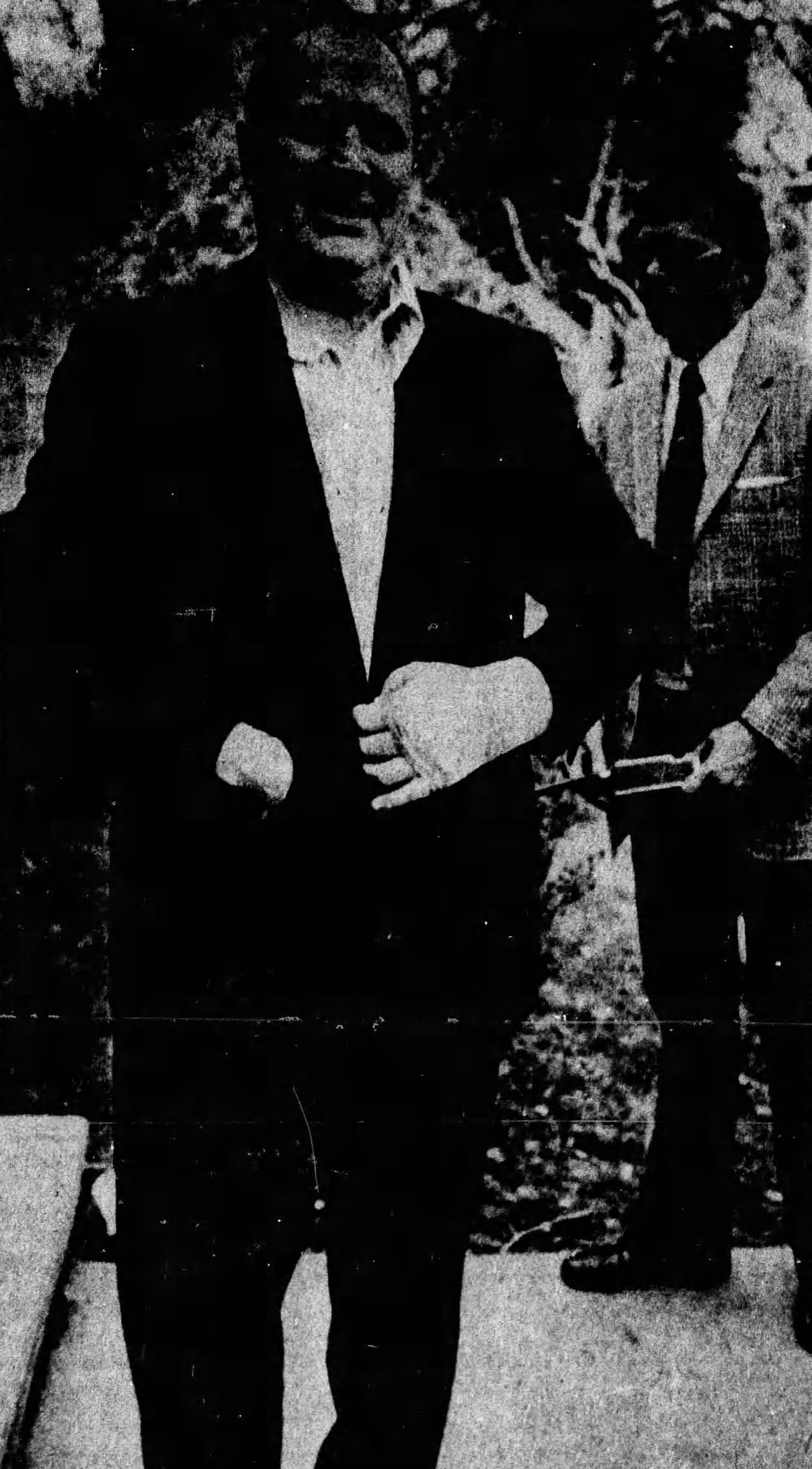
- Morris (left) in 1975
- Born: John Paul Morris; February 20, 1926; Mahanoy City, Pennsylvania, US
- Died: April 28, 2002 (aged 76); Philadelphia, Pennsylvania, US
- Occupation: Trade unionist
- Employer: International Brotherhood of Teamsters
- Children: 2

John Paul Morris (February 20, 1926 – April 28, 2002) was an American trade unionist.

Born in Pennsylvania, Morris was raised in a large family with strong ties to unionizing, with his grandfather being a member of the Molly Maguires. He began unionizing early in his life and founded Local 115 of the International Brotherhood of Teamsters in 1955, serving as its business manager and secretary-treasurer.

Under Morris' leadership, Local 115 expanded to have thousands of members in multiple industries. He was an uncompromising organizer and showed solidarity for all working class people. He and Local 115 had a reputation of violence, such as a 1998 assault on anti-Bill Clinton demonstrators. In 1999, he was dismissed from Local 115 by the Teamsters President, who accused him of attacking union members and stockpiling weapons. He sued the Teamsters president and denied the claims, though died before a verdict had been reached.

== Early life ==
Morris was born on February 20, 1926, in Mahanoy City, Pennsylvania, To Eleanor and Henry Morris. Of Irish ancestry, he came from a family with a history of union support. His grandfather, his namesake, was a member of the Molly Maguires, a secret trade unionist society that resisted coal companies in the late 1800s. His grandfather ended up going to prison for seven years for his involvement with the organization, and after his release, later became a judge. The Molly Maguires later disbanded after having 19 of the leaders hanged.

Morris was part of a large Irish Catholic family and had eleven siblings. Morris' father, who was also from a large family with eleven siblings, worked as a breaker boy separating slate from coal, and after an injury at age nine, became a piano tuner.

At age 15, Morris touched a power line during a storm and was electrocuted. The electrocution sent 4,000 or 7,000 volts through his body for seven minutes. He entered cardiac arrest and spend four months in the hospital, and as a result, had lost most of the fingers on his right hand, only retaining his thumb.

Morris attended the University of Scranton, on a football scholarship, and while in college, organized the football team to successfully strike against the university to protest a lack of funds for football uniforms. While playing football for the college, he broke his nose in a game. Morris dropped out of university after one year. In 1946, married Jean McCarthy, his high school sweetheart, having two children and moving to Philadelphia together.

== Career ==
=== Leadership ===
"Me and another kid went down to the fur department and we stuffed pigeons in the sleeves of these expensive coats...When the store opened, women went in there and they're putting on these coats and the pigeons are flying. The supervisor came after me. 'You've done it! you've done it! What's going to happen next?' I said: 'Sign the contract. Here it is, right here. Sign it.' He signed it."
— John Morris describing his pigeon event to a reporter in 1993.

In Philadelphia, Morris and his wife worked at Lit Brothers, a department store. Morris a shipping clerk, was a member of Teamsters Local 169 at the time. While at Lit Brothers, he led his first employee strike, winning the employees a raise through his tactics, which included hiding pigeons in fur coat sleeves during a sale. In 1950, he initiated a strike with its 300 clerks after having convinced them to participate in a Christmas celebration outside; they demanded a six-day workweek, though were given a five-day workweek after one and a half days.

In 1955, Morris founded Local 115 of the Teamsters, with seven members. He served as its business manager and secretary-treasurer.

Under his leadership, Local 115 expanded into the suburbs surrounding Philadelphia. On November 5, 1974, it was made the official union of Cheltenham Township public employees. In 1975, 88 of them went on strike. They demanded a new contract following the decision to clear four tons of trash from parks. On April 2, Morris arrived into the township with a bullhorn and addressed the workers and condemned strikebreakers. He was arrested due to breaking a code against the use of bullhorns in the area, and was held on a bail of $1,000. Another 250 police officer, using riot gear, broke up the strikers. The courts agreed with the police response, stating they were protecting strikebreakers.

In 1984, Morris defeated Gordon Grubb in the election for president of Teamsters Joint Council 53 – an assembly of Teamsters across Pennsylvania – in a vote of 101–99. Grubb had previously served as its president, and during his campaign, Morris criticized his inactive promotion of the council during his tenure. He was re-elected in 1985, without contest. In 1991, he was elected one of three vice president of the Teamsters Eastern Conference, under Ron Carey; he received 43,503 votes. As a vice president, he made labor agreements with politicians such as Governor Tom Ridge. Morris represented players in the 1987 NFL strike, during which he called strikebreaking players "scabs".

At Local 115's peak, it had 2,700 members, including store clerks, truckers, and educators. It had a reputation for violence, with many threats and assaults being linked to the union by a magistrate in 1994. In October 1998, multiple members of the union were arrested for attacking people protesting a visit to Philadelphia by Democratic presidential candidate Bill Clinton; Morris had previously campaigned for Clinton in 1992 and was believed to have orchestrated it. For it, Time nicknamed Morris the "Last of the Molly Maguires".

In November 1999, James P. Hoffa, then-president of the Teamsters, dismissed Morris as vice president of Local 115, and accused him of attacking union members and using a $1-million insurance fund to buy personal insurance and armaments, which included shotguns, stun guns, pepper spray, combat attire, and multiple vehicles, all of which he stored in a building near union headquarters. In a lawsuit, Morris said the weapons were for a strike, and his removal was retaliation for serving under Hoffa's electoral opponent, Ron Carey. At the time of his death, the verdict was pending.

=== Organization methods and beliefs ===
Morris was an aggressive and active organizer, with strikes often lasting 3 months or more, and loudly playing songs – such as "We Will Rock You" in later years – from the trucks of employees. He had an intimidating presence on a picket line with his disfigured hand, a nose that had been broken twice, a collarbone that had been broken four times, and "scars of clubbings, stabbings and surgery on his chin, chest, back and across a kneecap". He wrote a manual for organizing, which continued to be used by union officials to organize after his death, including by the labor issues department of Harvard University. By the time of his death, it was the only manual of such in use by the Teamsters.

Morris was uncompromising as a union leader, such as in 1979, when a Goodwill Industries location went out of business because it refused new contracts demanded by Local 115. He was known for his loyalty, as evidenced by when in the 1970s, when the Federal Bureau of Investigation recorded a mobster and informant stating that Morris should be killed because he would compromised on a labor contract with a restaurant in New Jersey. The Philadelphia Inquirer wrote about the incident, saying that he was "[s]o clean, it seems, he was marked to die". He was nicknamed "Mr. Clean" for avoiding scandal. He showed solidarity for working-class people both in and not in his union, evidenced in 1983, when Local 115 participated in a convoy in support of a strike by Greyhound Lines workers. They used a total of fifty vehicles to block traffic for around 35 minutes. He opposed the Labor Management Reporting and Disclosure Act of 1959, believing in more autonomy for unions. He criticized the election system the law put into place, because it would allow the media to control discourse.

== Personal life and death ==
Morris supported Democratic Party politicians, and supported Teamster President Ron Carey for doing the same. He spoke at the 1984 Saint Patrick's Day parade in Philadelphia. In his speech, he commemorated the city's Irish American heritage.

Morris died on April 28, 2002, aged 76, in Hahnemann University Hospital, in Philadelphia, from a virus caused by arterial surgery complications. In his final months, he contracted cardiovascular issues. He spent more than 100 days between three hospitals. His funeral was held on May 2 and he was buried in Resurrection Cemetery, in Bensalem Township. After his death, Arthur B. Shostak, a professor of labor issues at Drexel University, said of him that he was a union leader who "never doubted and never retreated" and that "they're not making them like him anymore".
