= Šesták =

Šesták or Sestak is a Czech and Slovak surname. Feminine form: Šestáková. Notable people with the name include:

== Šestak ==
- Marija Šestak (born 1979), Slovenian/Serbian triple jumper
- Martina Šestáková (born 1978), Czech triple jumper
- Matija Šestak (born 1972), Slovenian sprinter who specialized in the 400 meters
- Stanislav Šesták (born 1982), Slovak footballer
- Zdeněk Šesták (1925–2026), Czech composer, musicologist, flautist and educator

== Sestak ==
- Luca Sestak (born 1995), German boogie-woogie, blues and jazz pianist
- Joe Sestak (born 1951), American politician and former admiral
- Tom Sestak (1936–1987), American footballer

== See also ==
- Seszták, Hungarian respelling
- Shestak, Shostak, Szostak
