= Shestakov =

Shestakov (masculine, Russian: Шестаков) or Shestakova (feminine, Russian: Шестакова) is a Russian surname. Notable people with the surname include:

- Dmitri Shestakov (born 1983), Russian soccer player
- Igor Shestakov (born 1984), Russian soccer player
- Ivan Shestakov (1820–1888), Russian admiral, statesman, and writer
- Kirill Shestakov (born 1985), Russian soccer player
- Lev Shestakov (1915–1944), Soviet military aviator
- Nikolai Shestakov (1954–ca. 1977), Soviet Russian serial killer
- Sergei Shestakov (born 1961), Russian soccer coach and former player
- Serhiy Shestakov (born 1990), Ukrainian soccer player
- Victor Shestakov (1907–1987), Russian–Soviet logician and theoretician of electrical engineering
- Vladimir Shestakov (born 1961), Soviet judoka
- Yevheniy Shestakov (born 1976), Ukrainian boxer
- Yuri Shestakov (born 1985), Russian soccer player
- Natalia (Sergeyevna) Shestakova (born 1988, Perm), Russian pair skater

== See also ==
- Shestak
- Shostakovich
- Shostakov
