= Mahanoy Area School District =

School district in Pennsylvania, United States

Address
- 1 Golden Bear Drive Mahanoy City, Schuylkill County, Pennsylvania, 17948; United States

District information
- Type: Public
- Grades: K-12
- Established: -1959

Students and staff
- District mascot: Golden Bears
- Colors: Black and Gold

Other information
- Website: www.mabears.net

The Mahanoy Area School District is a small, rural public school district in Schuylkill County, Pennsylvania. It serves the municipalities of Mahanoy City, Mahanoy Township, Delano Township, Ryan Township, and Gilberton. Mahanoy Area School District encompasses approximately 53 square miles (140 km^{2}). According to 2000 federal census data, the district served a resident population of 8,939 people. By 2010, the district's population increased to 11,472 people. The educational attainment levels for the Mahanoy Area School District population (25 years old and over) were 80.9% high school graduates and 9.2% college graduates.

According to the Pennsylvania Budget and Policy Center, 64.6% of the district's pupils lived at 185% or below the Federal Poverty Level as shown by their eligibility for the federal free or reduced price school meal programs in 2012. In 2013 the Pennsylvania Department of Education, reported that 20 students in the Mahanoy Area School District were homeless. In 2009, the Mahanoy Area School District residents’ per capita income was $15,472, while the median family income was $35,759. In Schuylkill County, the median household income was $45,012. In the Commonwealth, the median family income was $49,501 and the United States median family income was $49,445, in 2010.

The Mahanoy Area School District closed its middle school at the end of the 2016–17 school year. Since then, the Mahanoy Area School District has operated one elementary school (K-6), and one Jr./Sr. High school (7–12). The district is one of the 500 public school districts of Pennsylvania. High school students may choose to attend the Schuylkill Technology Centers for training in the construction and mechanical trades. The Schuylkill Intermediate Unit IU29 provides the district with a wide variety of services like: specialized education for disabled students; state mandated training on recognizing and reporting child abuse; speech and visual disability services; criminal background check processing for prospective employees and professional development for staff and faculty.

== Extracurriculars ==
The district offers a wide variety of clubs, activities and an extensive sports program.

=== Sports ===
The district operates an indoor swimming pool.

The district funds:

Boys

- Baseball – AA
- Basketball – AA
- Cross Country – A
- Football – A
- Golf – AA
- Swimming and Diving – AA
- Track and Field – AA
- Wrestling – AA

Girls

- Basketball – AA
- Cross Country – A
- Golf _ AA
- Softball – A
- Swimming and Diving – AA
- Track and Field – AA
- Volleyball – A

Middle School Sports

Boys

- Basketball
- Cross Country
- Football
- Track and Field
- Wrestling

Girls

- Basketball
- Cross Country
- Track and Field

According to PIAA directory July 2016

== See also ==
- Mahanoy Area School District v. B.L.: U.S. Supreme Court case
