= Coal breaker =

Coal processing plant which breaks coal into various sizes

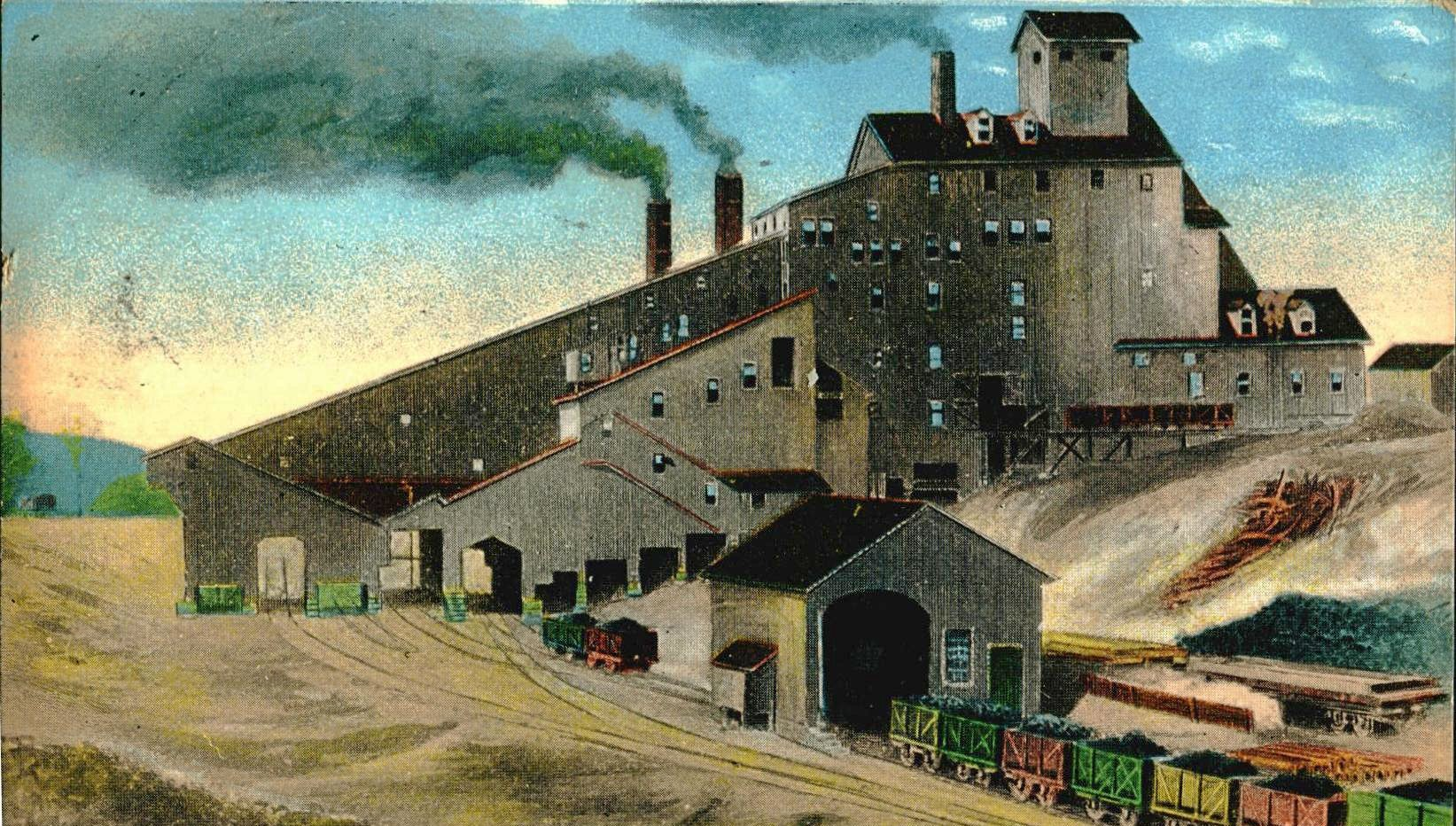
A coal breaking plant, depicted on a postcard in 1907.

A coal breaker is a coal processing plant which breaks coal into various useful sizes. Coal breakers also remove impurities from the coal (typically slate) and deposit them into a culm dump. The coal breaker is a forerunner of the modern coal preparation plant.

Coal tipples typically were used at bituminous coal mines, where removing impurities was important but sorting by size was only a secondary, minor concern. Coal breakers were always used (with or without a tipple) at anthracite mines. While tipples were used around the world, coal breakers were used primarily in the United States in the state of Pennsylvania (where, between 1800 and the mid-20th century, many of the world's known anthracite reserves were located). At least one source claims that, in 1873, coal breaking plants were found only at anthracite mines in Pennsylvania.

== Function ==
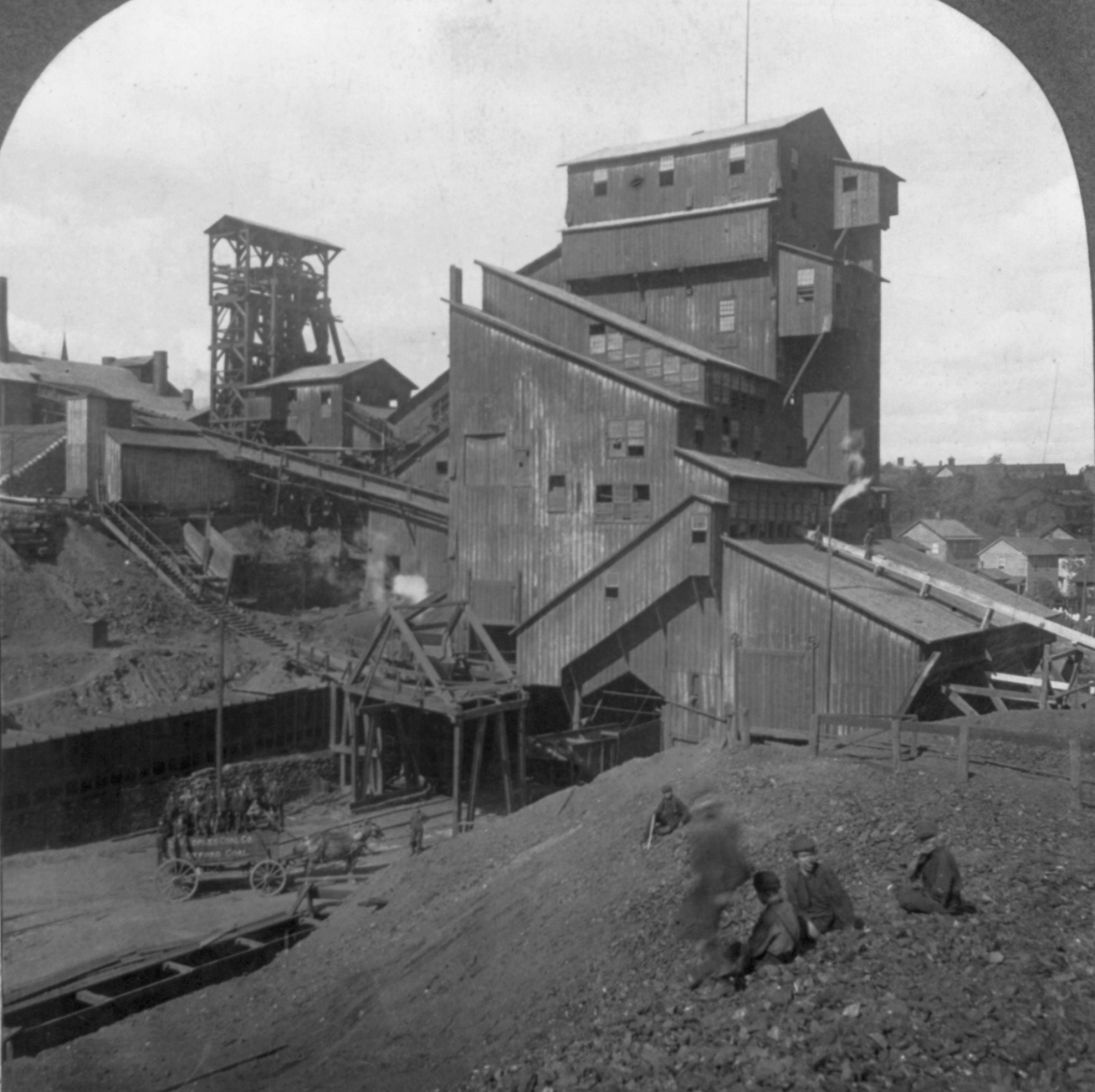
Coal breaker at an anthracite coal mine near Scranton, Pennsylvania, 1905

The first function of a coal breaker is to break coal into pieces and sort these pieces into categories of nearly uniform size, a process known as breaking. The second function of a coal breaker is to remove impurities (such as slate or rock), and then grade the coal on the basis of the percent of impurities remaining. The sorting by size is particularly important for anthracite coal. In order to burn efficiently, air must flow evenly around anthracite. Subsequently, most anthracite coal is sold in uniform sizes. In the 1910s, there were six commercial sizes of coal (with the smallest size having three subsets):

- Steam – 4.5 to 6 inches (11 to 15 cm) in size (primarily used as steamship fuel).
- Broken – 3.25 to 4.5 inches (8.3 to 11.4 cm) in size.
- Egg – 2.25 to 2.3 inches (5.7 to 5.8 cm) in size.
- Stove – 1.5 to 1.625 inches (3.81 to 4.13 cm) in size (primarily used in home cooking stoves).
- Chestnut – 0.875 to 0.9375 inches (2.223 to 2.381 cm) in size.
- Pea – 0.5 to 0.625 inches (1.27 to 1.59 cm) in size. There were three subsets of "pea coal":
  - No. 1 Buckwheat – 8/32 to 10/32 inch (6.4 to 7.9 mm) in size.
  - No. 2 Buckwheat – 6/32 inch (4.8 mm) in size.
  - No. 3 Buckwheat – 3/32 to 4/32 inch (2.4 to 3.2 mm) in size.

Coal pieces smaller than 3/32 inch (2.4 mm) in size were considered "culm," and unable to be separated from the impurities (and thus useless). The grade of coal ranged from a low of 5 percent impurities for steam or broken coal to a high of 15 percent for pea-size coal and its subsets.

== Pre-breaker treatment of coal ==
Coal breakers were located as close to the anthracite mine entrance as possible, so as to minimize the distance the coal had to travel before processing. Prior to entering the breaker, the coal would be crushed and sorted in a coal tipple and, if necessary and if water was available, washed. All coal was screened in the tipple as it came out of the mine so that steam-sized or smaller pieces could travel immediately to the coal washer and/or coal breaker. Chunks of coal which were too large were then crushed (sometimes several times) in the tipple until it passed through the screen (e.g., was of acceptable steam size or smaller).

Raw coal often contains impurities such as slate, sulphur, ash (or "bone"), clay, or soil, which requires that it be cleaned before shipment to market. Mine workers sampled the coal as it came out of the mine to determine whether the level of impurity recommended washing (if washing was available). Slate, sulphur, and ash have a higher relative density than coal, and will sink in agitated water. Passing the coal through the tipple was an essential pre-treatment process for coal washing, however, because the impure coal must be of similar sized lumps for coal washing to work. If coal washing was conducted, coal might enter the breaker "wet". This meant the incline of the various belts and conveyors had to be lowered so that the coal did not slide on the belts or move too quickly down chutes. Where coal washing was used, the coal breaker was expanded to handle both "dry" and "wet" coal simultaneously.

== History and technology ==
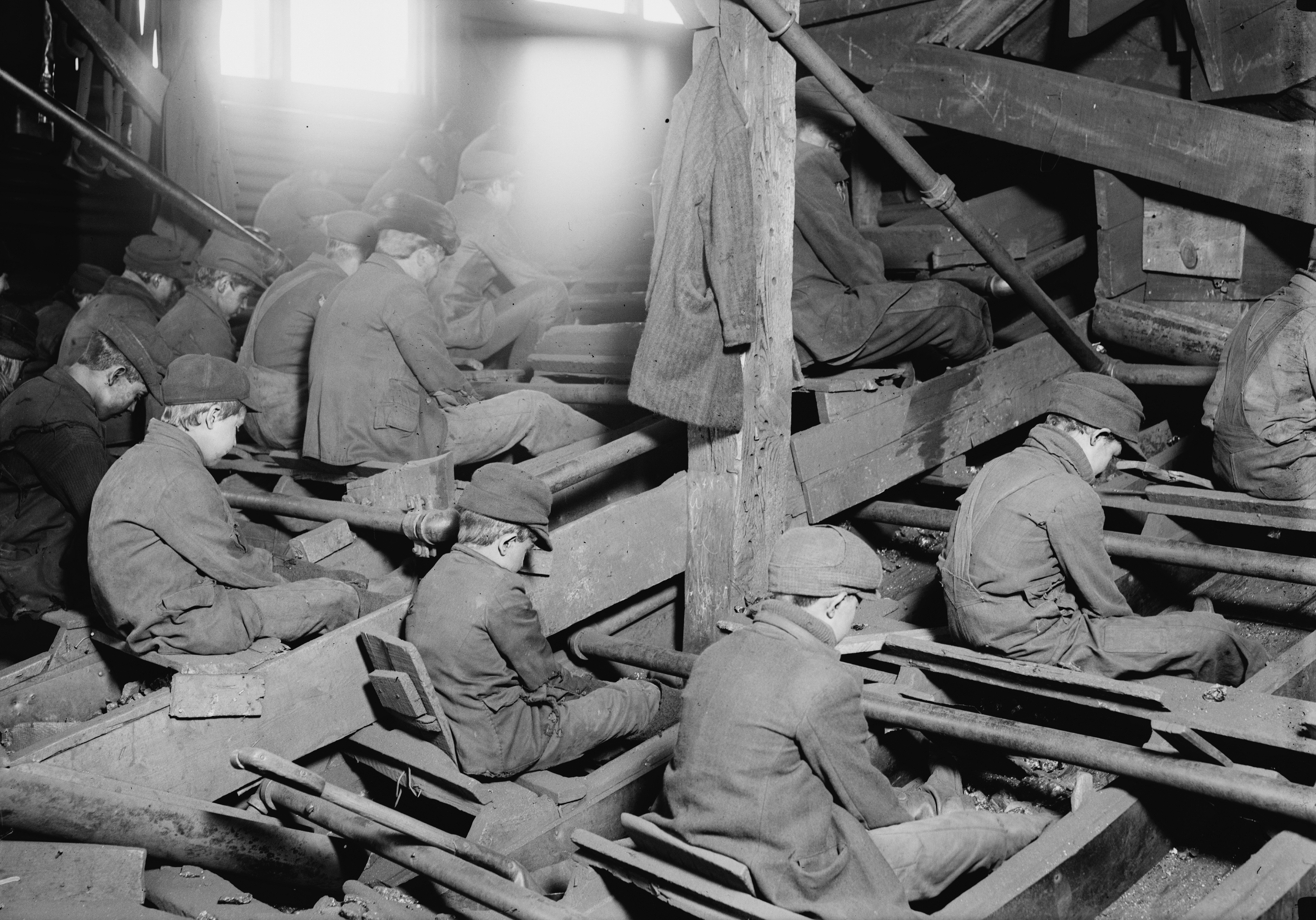
Breaker boys sort coal at an anthracite coal breaker near South Pittston, Pennsylvania, 1911

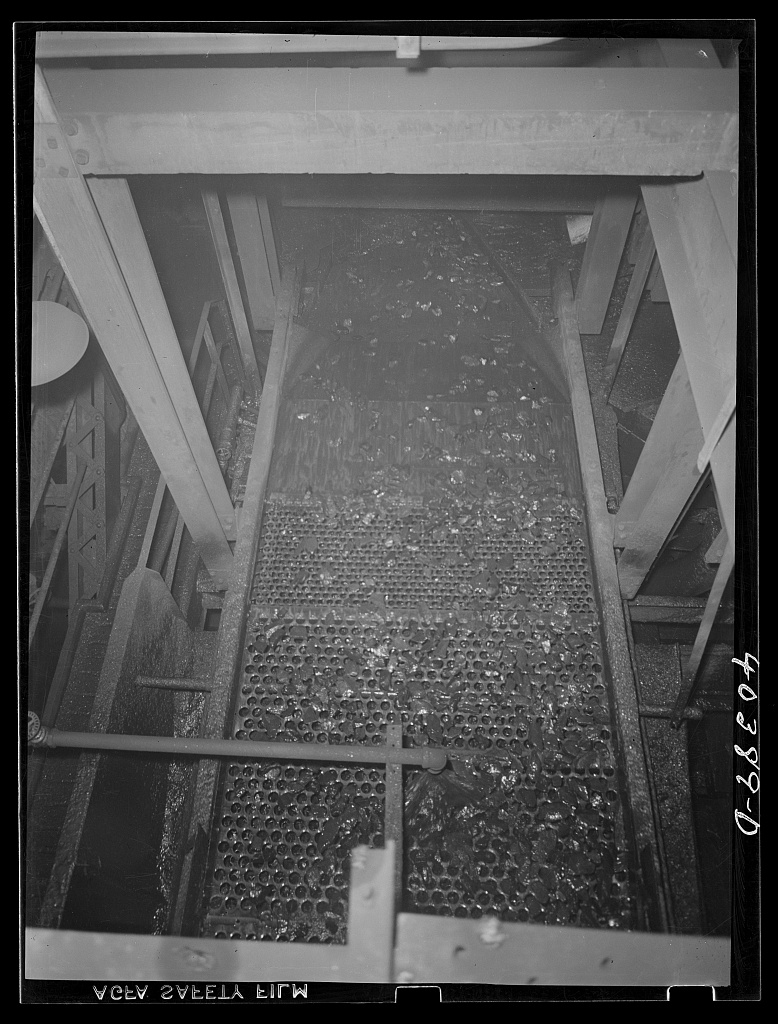
Coal being sorted by size and impurities removed on a dry screen at the Saint Nicholas breaker near Gilberton, Pennsylvania, 1938

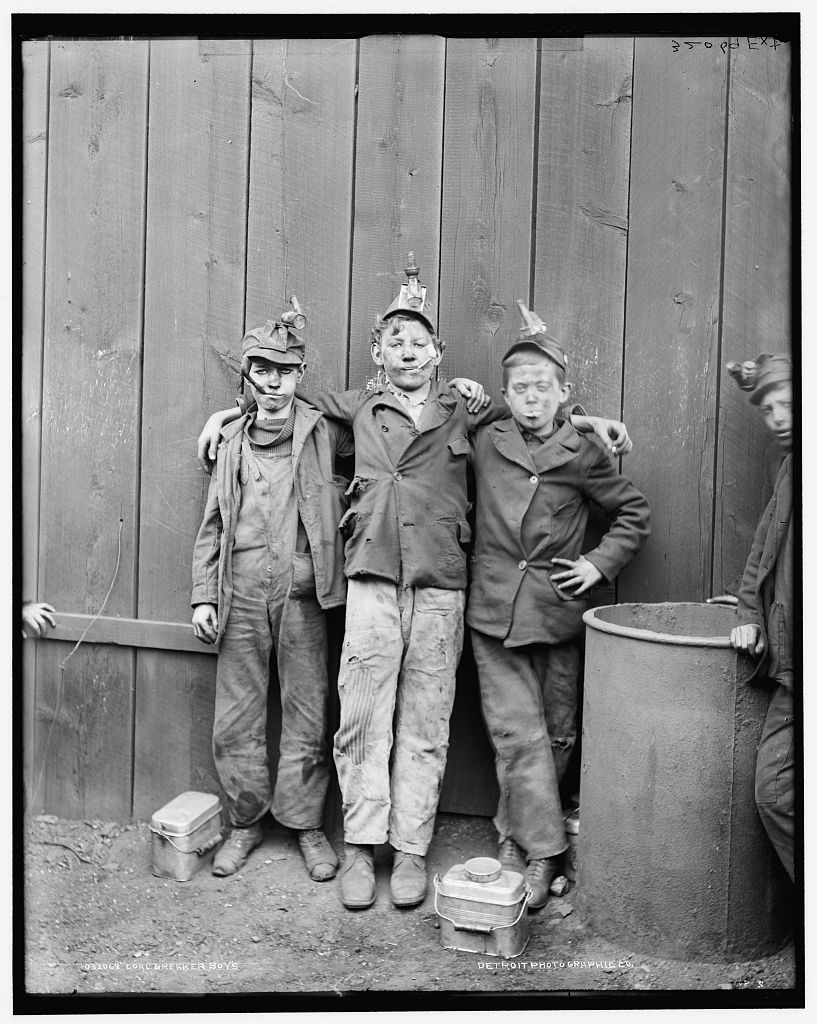
Coal breaker boys

Prior to 1830, bituminous and anthracite coal received little processing. The individual miner would use a sledgehammer to break up large lumps of coal, then use a rake whose teeth were set two inches apart to collect the larger pieces of coal for transport to the surface. Smaller lumps of coal were considered nonmarketable and left in the mine. Beginning about 1830, surface processing of coal began. Lumps of coal were placed on plates of perforated cast iron and men known as "breakers" would hammer on the coal until it was in lumps small enough to fall through the holes. The coal fell into a second screen, where it was shaken (by hand, animal, steam, or water power) and the smaller lumps sorted. This "broken and screened" coal was worth much more than lump coal.

Although bituminous coal had been widely burned as fuel since ancient times, anthracite coal did not come into widespread use until the 1820s. Shortly after the start of the 19th century, experiments in the United States showed that if anthracite coal lumps were more uniform in size and air flowed more evenly around the fuel, anthracite would burn hotter, more cleanly, and for a longer period of time than bituminous coal. Jesse Fell was the first to successfully burn anthracite coal on an open air grate. His method and 'discovery' in Wilkes-Barre, PA in 1808 led to the widespread use of coal as the fuel source that helped to foster America's industrial revolution. Anthracite coal began to be widely used in Wales in 1813 and France by 1814, and throughout the eastern United States by 1828. Efforts were soon made to discover ways to process anthracite coal to achieve the desired uniformity.

The modern coal breaker can be traced to 1844. Joseph Battin, a supervisor at a coal gas manufacturing plant in Philadelphia, Pennsylvania, invented the first coal breaker—two cast iron rollers (one with teeth, one with holes to accept the teeth) through which the coal was crushed before it rolled down a chute and then through an inclined cylindrical screen. The screen had a mesh which was fine toward the front and became progressively less so toward the end. Larger chunks of coal, falling inside the cylinder as it rotated, broke up and eventually passed through the screen. Impurities, which were heavier, tended to exit the breaker at the end of the screen. The sorted coal would then be collected in bins below the screen, and transported to market. A fellow Pennsylvanian, Gideon Bast, licensed the technology from Battin, and erected the first commercial coal breaker in Schuylkill County, Pennsylvania, on February 28, 1844. A number of coal processing machines—such as rollers, crushers, washers, and screens—were developed in Europe and later utilized in the United States. By 1866, the coal breaker in the United States had taken the form most recognized today, with multiple stories and numerous screening processes and mechanical sorting devices. The first steam-powered shaking screens were used in the U.S. 1890, and the first steam-powered coal washers installed in 1892.

Until about 1900, nearly all anthracite coal breakers were labor-intensive. The removal of impurities was done by hand, usually by boys between the ages of 8 and 12 years old known as breaker boys. The use of breaker boys began in the U.S. around 1866. The breaker boys would sit on wooden seats, perched over chutes and conveyor belts, picking slate and other impurities out of the coal. Breaker boys worked 10 hours a day for six days a week. The work was hazardous. Breaker boys were forced to work without gloves so that they could handle the slick coal better. The slate, however, was sharp, and boys would leave work with their fingers cut and bleeding. Many breaker boys lost fingers to the rapidly moving conveyor belts, while others, moving about the plant, had their feet, hands, arms, and legs amputated when they moved among the machinery and accidentally slipped under the belts or into the gears. Many died when they fell into the gears of the machinery, their bodies only retrieved at the end of the working day. Others were caught in the rush of coal, and crushed to death or smothered. The "dry" coal kicked up so much dust that the breaker boys sometimes wore lamps on their heads to see, and asthma and black lung disease were common.

Public outrage against the use of breaker boys was so widespread that in 1885 Pennsylvania enacted a law forbidding the employment of anyone under the age of 12 from working in a coal breaker. But the law was poorly enforced, and many employers and families forged birth certificates or other documents so children could work. Estimates of the number of breaker boys at work in the anthracite coal fields of Pennsylvania vary widely, and official statistics are considered by historians to undercount the numbers significantly. Estimates include 20,000 breaker boys working in the state in 1880, 18,000 working in 1900, 13,133 working in 1902, and 24,000 working in 1907. Technological innovations in the 1890s and 1900s such as mechanical and water separators designed to remove impurities from coal significantly reduced the need for breaker boys, but adoption of the new technology was slow. By the 1910s, the use of breaker boys was finally dropping because of improvements in technology, stricter child labor laws, and compulsory schooling laws. The practice of employing children in coal breakers largely ended by 1920 because of the efforts of the National Child Labor Committee, sociologist and photographer Lewis Hine, and the National Consumers League, who educated the public about the practice and succeeded in passing child labor laws.

The regulation of coal breakers came slowly in the United States. In the United Kingdom, the government enacted a law in the mid-19th century requiring that coal breakers be built away from mine entrances. But in the U.S., neither the federal government nor the states adopted regulation of coal breakers until after many lives had been lost. Two disasters prompted the adoption of legislation. The first occurred on September 6, 1869, when a small explosion at the Avondale mine in Plymouth, Pennsylvania, blew flames up the mine shaft. The wooden breaker built over the mine opening caught fire and collapsed, trapping and killing 110 workers in the mine below. No legislative or regulatory action was taken at that time. But in 1871, a fire destroyed the wooden breaker built over a mine opening in West Pittston, Pennsylvania, trapping and killing 24 miners. Despite a shift away from wooden construction of coal breakers and opposition from the coal industry, the state of Pennsylvania adopted a law in 1885 requiring that coal breakers be situated at least 200 feet from the opening of any mine.

=== Dry sorters and wet jigs ===
A number of inventions in the late 19th century and early 20th century led to the use of mechanical devices for separating impurities from coal in coal breakers.

Screens and sorters were used for dry coal. Some examples from the beginning of the 20th century are:

- Sorting bars – Sorting bars were iron bars (set in a rectangle 3 to 6 feet wide and 8 to 12 feet long) which were close together where the coal was poured in but which spread progressively further apart, allowing the coal to be roughly separated by the size of each lump. The bars were at an incline, and the heavier slate, ash, and sulphur slid off the bars (and down a chute which delivered it to a culm pile) while the coal fell through.
- Oscillating bars – Sometimes bars moved back and forth (often at 100 to 150 oscillations per minute), which not only tended to move the coal along the bars toward the end but also shake off dirt and slightly crush the larger lumps of coal into smaller pieces.
- Slate pickers – The "Houser slate picker", invented in 1893, passed sorted coal of a uniform size over a corrugated iron plate that tended to force the flat slate upright. The upright slate would be caught between horizontal iron bars suspended over the corrugated plate, the bars suspended high enough over the plate to permit coal to pass beneath them.
- Gravity separators – One example of a gravity separator is the "Herring separator". This separator consisted of an inclined chute with a rough surface, at the end of which was an opening in the bottom of the chute. The heavier slate, ash, and sulphur would slide along the bottom of the chute, picking up friction from the rough surface and falling through the gap in the bottom of the chute, while the lighter coal would have enough velocity to pass over the gap and continue down the chute for further processing.

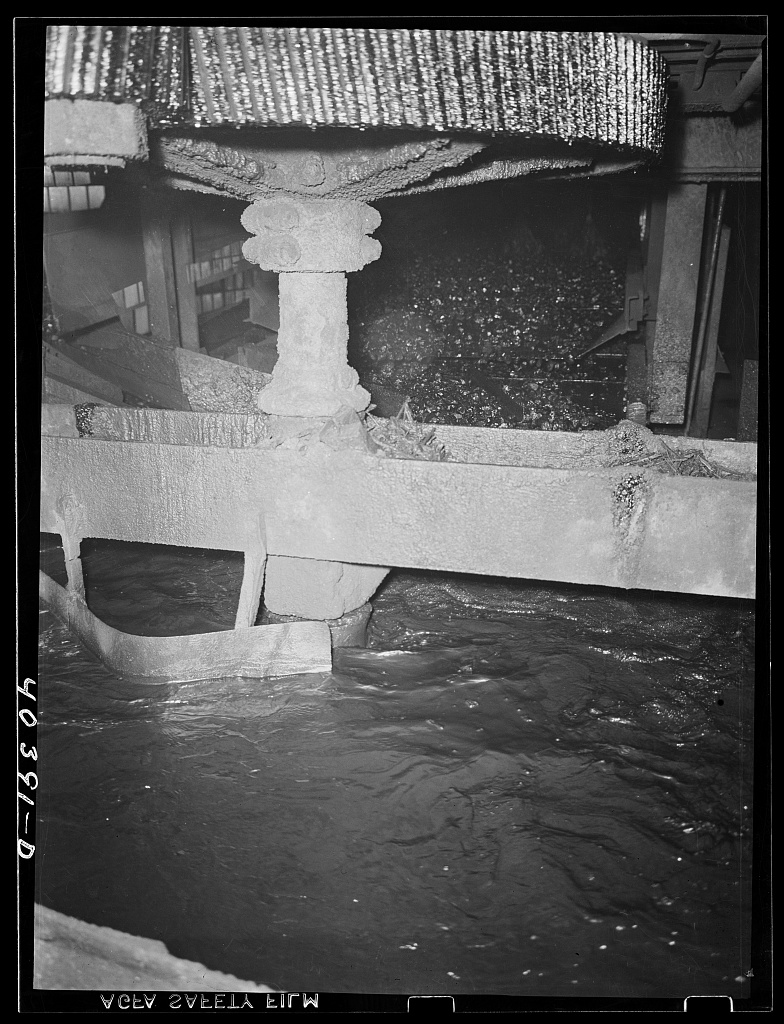
A Chance wet coal jig separator in operation in the Saint Nicholas breaker near Gilberton, Pennsylvania, 1938

To handle wet coal, coal jigs were used. Coal jigs separated coal from impurities by using gravity. Since the relative density of uniformly sized pieces of coal, slate, ash, dirt, and sulphur vary, pieces of each element will descend through water at different speeds—allowing them to be separated. Some examples of coal jigs from the beginning of the 20th century include:

- The "Luhrig jig" or "piston jig" - The piston jig pulled water down through a fine mesh screen so that the lighter coal rose to the top of the water and the heavier impurities did not. A conveyor belt with a paddle scraped across the top of the water as the piston reached the point of highest pressure and scooped the coal off and down a chute, while the heavier impurities (such as slate) were drawn down against an inclined screen and fell down a chute toward the culm pile.
- The moveable pan or "Stewart jig" - This jig developed after the Luhrig jig, and consisted of a large round tub set at an incline. A perforated metal plate moved up and down about 180 times a minute inside the tub. The movement of the tub created upward water pressure. The lighter coal was pushed toward the top of the tub, where paddles on a conveyor belt scraped it off the top of the water and down a chute for further processing, while the heavier slate tended to stay near the bottom of the tub and slide out an exit gate toward the culm pile.
- Sluice boxes (also known as Scaife trough washers) - Sluice boxes were used to separate small pieces of coal from heavier impurities. Riffles (low ridges set horizontal to the flow of water down the sluice) would capture the heavier impurities while permitting the lighter coal to move on.
- The "Christ coal jig" - Introduced in 1895, the Christ jig was an inclined rectangular box jig. A perforated iron plate moved up and down inside the box at a rapid rate, creating an upward water pressure that allowed slate to sink toward the bottom of the box (and out a culm gate) while the lighter coal tended to float toward the top of the water (where it was scooped off by a conveyor belt and then down a chute for further processing).
- The "Righter coal washer" - Invented just before 1900, the Righter coal washer used a conveyor belt with paddles to pass coal slurry over a finely woven iron screen. Dirt and other small particles of impurities tended to sink to the bottom of the water and pass through the screen into a collection tank, while the lighter coal floated in the water until it exited the washer and was collected by a conveyor.
- The "chestnut coal jig" - This was yet another circular coal jig. Used for lumps of coal which were chestnut size or smaller, the bottom of the jig was a circular tub. A convex (or concave upwards) perforated iron plate moved up and down in the water, creating upward water pressure. The upper part of the jig was a rotating round tub with a spiral shelf running around the inside. The iron plate forced the lighter coal toward the top of the water, where the rotating spiral shelf picked it up and conveyed it to the top of the jig and out a chute. The heavier impurities slid off the iron plate and out a culm gate.
- The Jeffrey-Robinson coal washer - This jig was similar in construction to the chestnut coal jig, but the water reached the top of the upper tub so that both water and coal would be spun out the top of the tub (dropping the coal into a catcher).

From 1936 to 1964, the amount of coal processed in wet jigs in the United States rose from 27 million tons per year to 146 million tons per year.

Separating, sorting, and jig technology continued to advance in the 20th century. The first compressed air sorter for fine coal (pea and smaller) was installed in the U.S. in 1916. Major innovations in the pneumatic cleaning of coal were made in 1924, 1932, and 1941. In 1935, the first dense-media separator was introduced. In these wet separators, a very dense medium (such as magnetite) is introduced into an agitated mixture of coal and water. The dense media drops to the bottom of the tank, sending water and the lighter material (such as coal) over the top for collection and drying. The first coal processing plant to utilize dense-medium separation widely was established by Dutch State Mines in 1945, and by 1950 the technology was in wide use in the U.S.

=== Shift to coal preparation plants ===
Methods of drying coal through the use of forced-air dryers, heat, and centrifuges were adopted by American coal companies throughout the 20th century. As many coal breakers handled heavier loads of coal, wooden buildings were abandoned in favor of structures made entirely of steel or reinforced concrete. In the mid-20th century, "Diester tables"—oscillating table-sized sluices—were widely adopted by the American coal industry, allowing even finer grades of coal to be processed and captured. Other processing devices such as froth flotation jigs and disc filters were also employed.

However, changing demand for coal in the post-World War II era led to the abandonment and consolidation of many coal breaking plants. Tipples, coal washing plants, and coal breakers were often merged into a single large plant to achieve economies of scale. Automation led to very significant reductions in the number of people needed to run plants, with smaller modular facilities sometimes requiring only a single operator. These coal preparation plants often accepted coal from several mines, and many were built far away from operating mines. By the 1970s, many coal breakers around the world were being shut down in favor of newer, larger coal preparation plants.

== Process ==
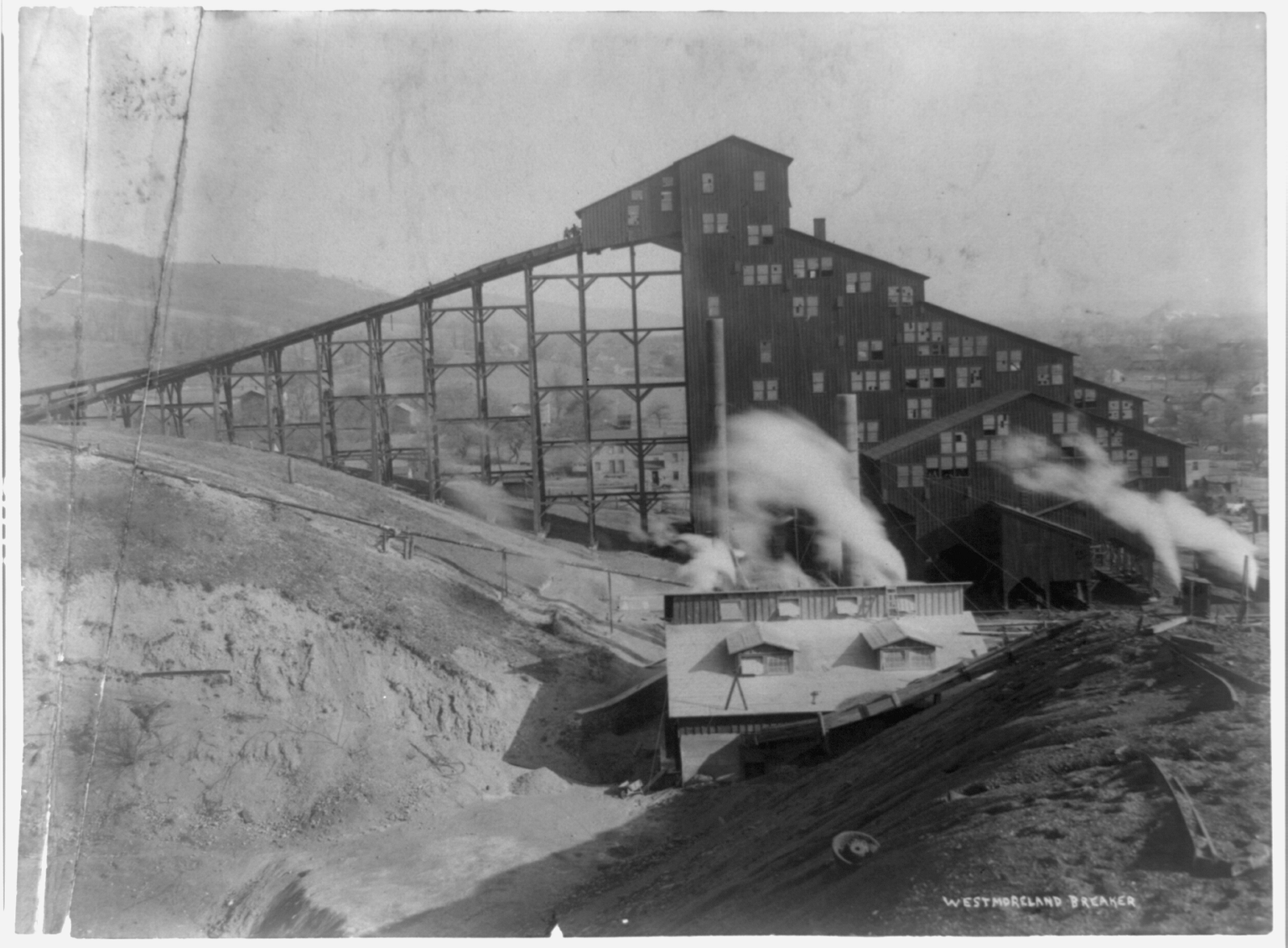
Westmoreland breaker, 1905

Ideally, coal breakers were placed so that the top of the breaking plant was equal to or slightly below the mine mouth so that gravity would move the coal to the breaking plant. Where this was not possible, coal would be hoisted to the top of the coal breaking plant. A boiler and boilerhouse would be located nearby to provide power for the hoist, moving screens, jigs, and crushers (although in more modern times this is supplied by electricity), along with an engine house (to house the engine for the hoist), pumps and pumphouse (to supply the coal washing machines with water), and headframe (for the hoist). The typical coal breaking plant was often eight or nine stories tall, sometimes rising 150 feet high or more.

In the typical coal breaking plant at the beginning of the 20th century, the coal entered the plant at the upper floor and slid down a gently inclined "picker table" where breaker boys removed obvious impurities such as rocks and large pieces of slate and threw them down chutes to the culm pile. The breakers also removed obviously clean lumps of coal and sent them down a separate "clean coal" chute for crushing. Lumps intermixed with impurities would go down a third chute for crushing and further cleaning.

On the second level of a typical breaker, coal would be roughly sorted. The fuel would move over sorting bars, with the various sizes of coal going down different chutes. Each type of roughly sorted coal would next pass over a "slate-picker screen" (sometimes called a "mud screen"), with the round coal falling through the screen and the flat slate passing over the screen to fall down a chute to the culm pile. Coal passing through the slate-picker screen would then be sorted by additional screens. Some of these second screens were composed of flat iron perforated by holes of larger size toward the rear (where the coal entered) and smaller holes toward the front. These flat screens were sometimes shaken back and forth (hence the name "shaking screens"), which not only removed dirt and sulphur from the coal but broke down larger lumps of coal into smaller sizes and sorted it for further cleaning and processing. Other screens were cylindrical, making 10 revolutions per minute and performing the same function as shaking screen. Flat and cylindrical screens could be single-jacketed (a single screen) or double-jacketed (two screens, the first or inner screen having larger openings while the second screen had smaller ones).

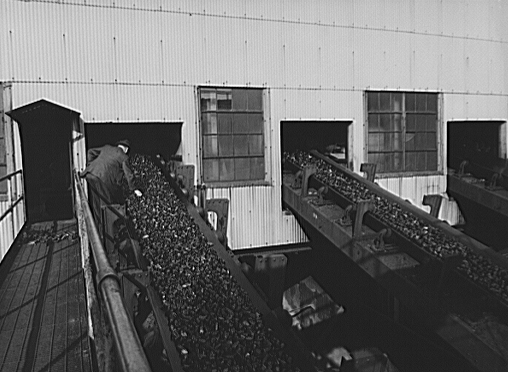
A company inspector examining coal on a car loading belt at the Saint Nicholas coal breaker in Gilberton, Pennsylvania, one of the two largest coal breakers in the world in 1938

The third level from the top was the crushing level. Most coal was still lump coal at this stage, and needed to be crushed in order to create smaller, more marketable product. Here, a series of interlocking, toothed crushers or rollers would break lump coal into progressively smaller sizes.

On the fourth level down, the coal was further cleaned of impurities. This was originally done primarily by hand, but hand picking was gradually supplanted after 1910 by improved screens and jigs. Although breaker boys worked at all levels of the coal breaker, most of the removal of impurities by hand occurred on this level. (Some picking did occur on the ground level of the coal breaker, where boys would locate good pieces of coal in the culm and return it to the "clean" coal stream.) Some coal might travel to this level directly from second level, if small enough, as at this level the screens and jigs were only capable of handling egg-grade coal and smaller. This area of the coal breaker was also where most dry screens and wet jigs operated. At this level, the use of conveyor belts (with or without paddles or scoops) was necessarily in order to move the smaller grades of coal, with most belts moving at about 33 feet per minute for pea coal and 50 feet per minute for larger grades. Multiple sorting and picking levels might exist in a single coal breaker, depending on the amount of coal to be processed.

Coal and culm were received at the ground level. Dry culm was taken away from the coal breaker by conveyor belt or rail car and dumped nearby. Very fine dry culm was sometimes separated from the heavier culm by forced air and blown through tubes to a separate pile. Wet culm was held in settling tanks or behind a coal slurry impoundment dam to allow particulate to settle out of the water. The "clean" coal, emerging from the coal breaker already sorted into its respective sizes, was collected primarily by rail cars and then delivered to market.

== See also ==
- Huber Breaker
- St. Nicholas coal breakers
