= St. Nicholas Breaker =

Coal breaker in Pennsylvania, US

Coordinates: 40.8082°N 76.1785°W

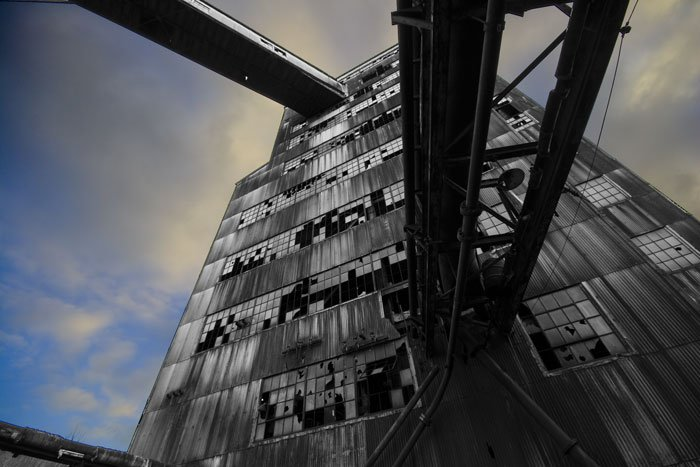
St. Nicholas Coal Breaker outside Mahanoy City, October 2007. The plant was last operated in 1972.

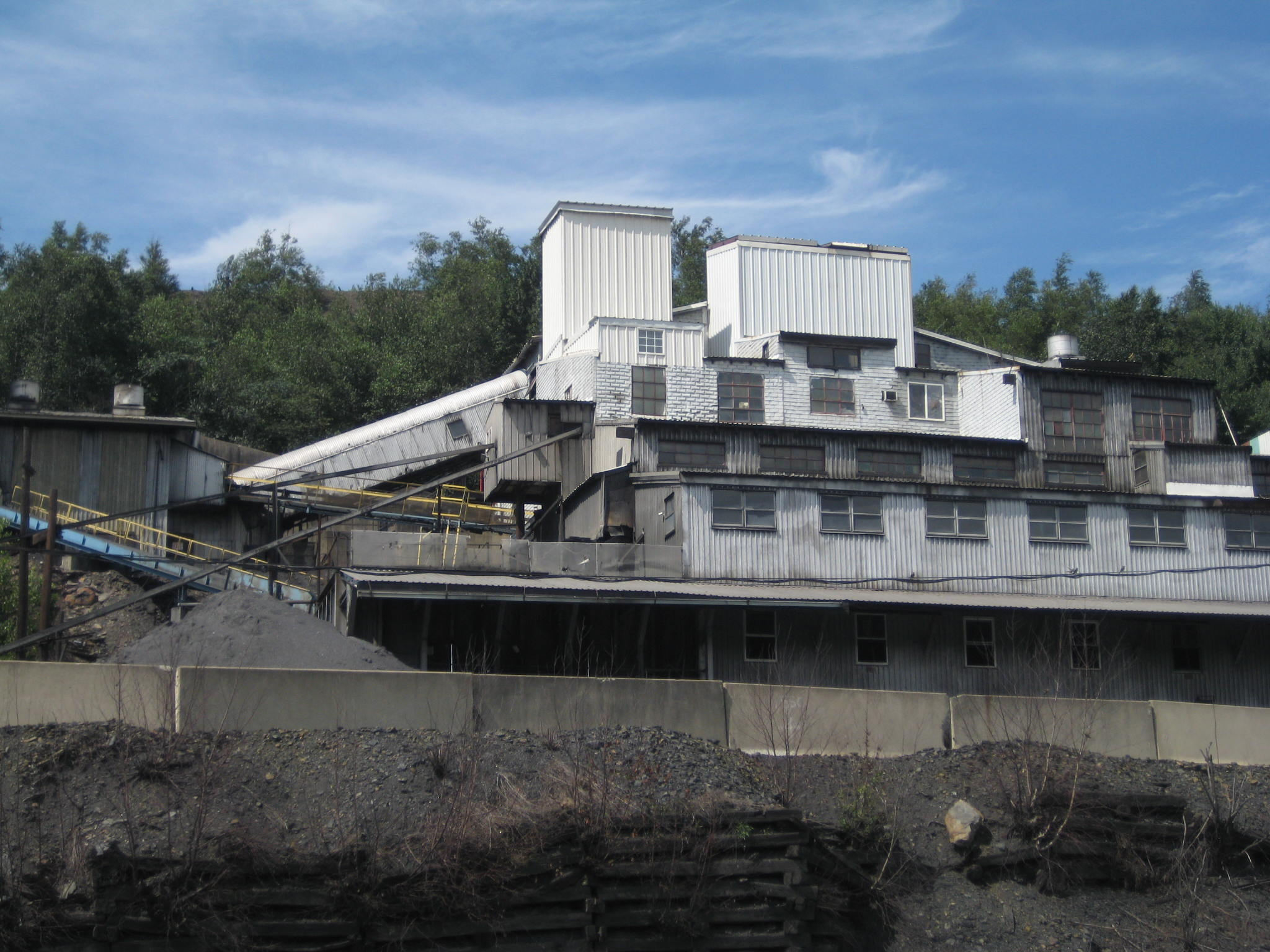
A mountaintop strip mine operates from the top and rear of the mountain

St. Nicholas Breaker was a historic coal breaker in Schuylkill County, Pennsylvania.

== Description ==
St. Nicholas Breaker was located between Mahanoy City and Shenandoah in Schuylkill County, Pennsylvania, in the southern part of the Coal Region. The breaker was once the largest of its kind, being the size of a city block and capable of processing 12,500 tons of coal per day. It has been described as having a "hulking, asymmetrical facade."

St. Nicholas Breaker was constructed using 3,800 tons of steel and 10,000 cubic yards of concrete. It contained 1.5 miles (2.4 km) of conveyor lines, 20 miles (32 km) of pipes, 25 miles (40 km) of conduits, 118 miles (190 km) of wire, and 26,241 square feet (2,437.9 m^{2}) of rubber belting. The construction required half of the village of Suffolk to be relocated.

St. Nicholas Breaker was described as sounding "like thunder" during operation. More recently, Kurt Zwikl, the executive director of the Schuylkill River Heritage Area, described the breaker as "fantastically unique building", but in "bad shape." It was divided into two sections that were capable of operating independently. Coal took 12 minutes to be processed by the breaker.

== History ==
St. Nicholas Breaker first became operational on March 11, 1931. It was the second breaker in the area to be named after Saint Nicholas; the first was built in 1861 and torn down in 1928. When the new breaker opened, it was the "crown jewel of a relatively safer, more modern anthracite industry". However, the breaker stopped operating in 1965.

In the early 2000s, there were proposals to make St. Nicholas Breaker a historical site. However, such a plan was found to be prohibitively expensive, costing tens of millions of dollars. As of 2013, the breaker was owned by the Reading Anthracite Company. In 2013, part of the breaker was demolished.

As of mid-2017, St. Nicholas Breaker was being dismantled piece by piece. The work has been ongoing for several years, but the bulk of the structure still stood. The breaker was the last remaining large-scale coal breaker in Northeastern Pennsylvania; there were once many area facilities with similar scale including the Huber and Locust Summit breakers. In 2015, numerous people came to visit the breaker before a round of demolition work began.

St. Nicholas Breaker was demolished in a controlled explosion on March 15, 2018.
