= Szostak =

Szostak is a gender-neutral Polish surname. Silesian spelling: Szostok. Other variants: Szóstak, Szustak. All of them are derived from number six, in particular, szóstak is an old Polish coin of 6 groszy. Notable people with the surname include:

- Adam Szustak, Polish Roman Catholic priest
- Alex Szostak (born 1986), Scottish rugby league footballer
- Edward Szostak (1911–1990), Polish basketball player
- Jack W. Szostak (born 1952), Canadian-American biologist of Polish-British descent
- Mieczysław Szostek (1933–2021), Polish doctor and politician
- Michał Szostak (born 1980), Polish organist, researcher, doctor of music arts
- Stanisław Szostak (1898–1961), Polish military officer
- Stéphanie Szostak (born 1975), French actress
- Wit Szostak (born 1976), Polish fantasy writer, philosopher and historian of Polish music folklore

== See also ==
- Shostak
- Šesták
