= Frank Shostak =

Economist

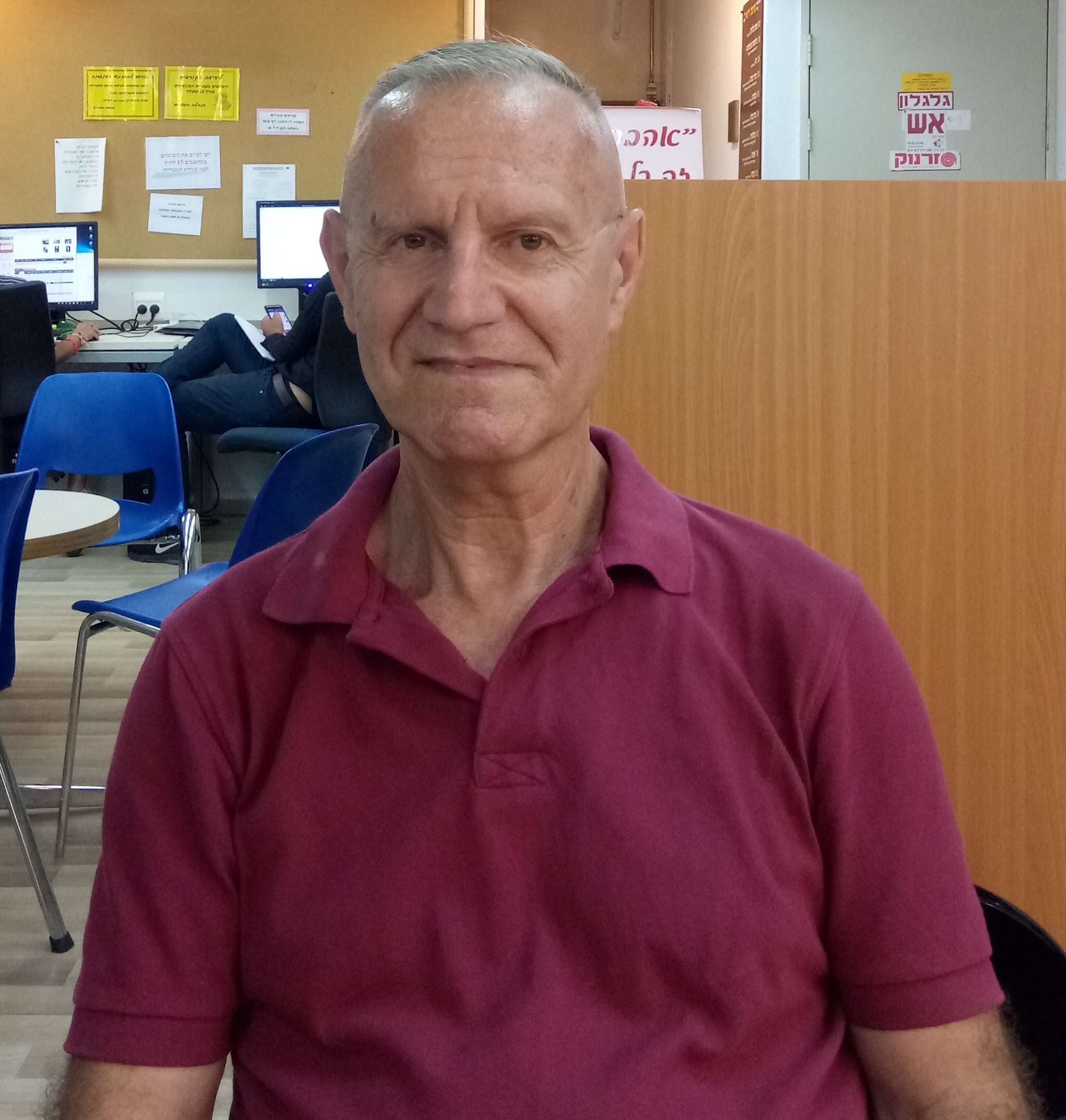
Frank Shostak, July 2017

Frank Shostak is an Austrian School economist. He is an adjunct scholar of the Mises Institute. His consulting firm, Applied Austrian School Economics, provides in-depth assessments and reports of financial markets and global economies.

== Biography ==
Frank Shostak was born in Riga, Latvia. He received his bachelor's degree from Hebrew University in 1970, master's degree from Witwatersrand University in 1978 and PhD from Rands Afrikaanse University in 1983. Between 1974 and 1980 he was head of the econometric department at the Standard Bank in Johannesburg. Between 1981 and 1985 he was head of the economic consulting firm "Econometrix". from 1986 to 2010 he had been employed as the chief economist of Ord Minnett Jardine Fleming Futures, one of the largest Australian brokerage firms. from 2010 to 2012 he was chief economist at AAS Economics. from 2012 to 2015 he was chief economist at MMG economic&research. he had returned to AAS Economics in 2015.

He is an adjunct scholar of the Ludwig von Mises Institute and a member of the board of editors of the Quarterly Journal of Austrian Economics. He is highly regarded for his skills to convert complex economic issues into plain English. He has written articles that have appeared in The Wall Street Journal and in academic journals in Europe and the US.
