= Shostakovich (surname) =

Shostakovich (Belarusian: Шастаковіч; Russian: Шостакович; Polish: Szostakowicz) is an East Slavic patronymic surname of Belarusian origin, historically attested in the territories of the former Grand Duchy of Lithuania and also found in eastern Poland and western regions of Russia. It derives from the Belarusian given name Shostak and bears the patronymic suffix "-ich" (denoting "son of Shostak"). It is a nickname derived either from the name of the coin (Belarusian: шастак, Polish: szóstak, Russian: шостак) denotes a six groschen, originally issued in the Grand Duchy of Lithuania and later circulated throughout the Polish–Lithuanian Commonwealth, or from a term of endearment for the 'sixth' child in a family. The name has been recorded since 15th century, both among nobles and commoners (peasants and city dwellers). Variant: Shestakovich (Шестакович).

Notable people with the surname include:

- Dmitri Shostakovich (1906–1975), Russian composer and pianist
- Galina Shostakovich (born 1936), Russian pianist and biologist, daughter of Dmitri
- Maxim Shostakovich (born 1938), Russian conductor and pianist, son of Dmitri
