= Breaker boy =

Type of coal-mining worker

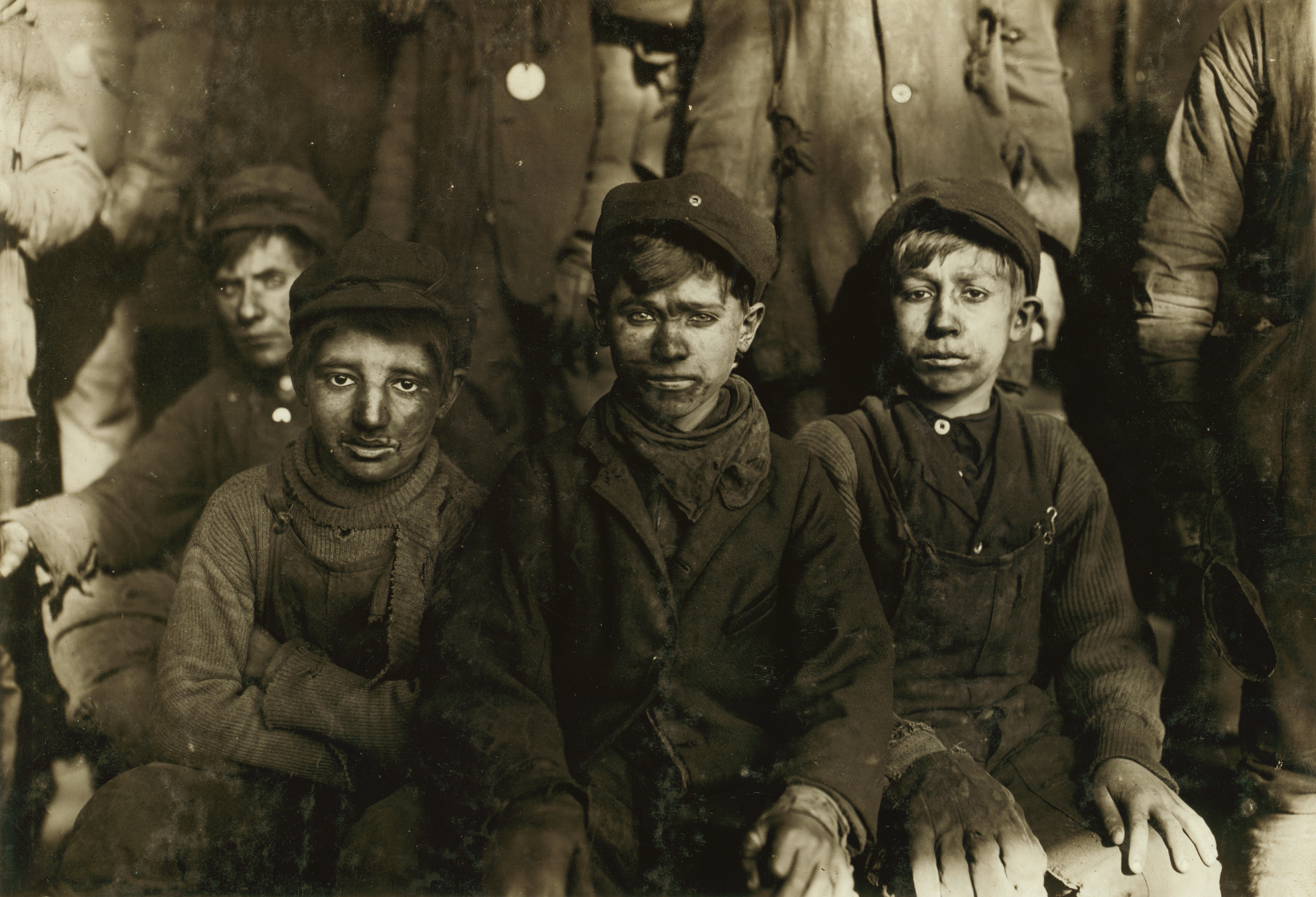
Group of Breaker boys. Smallest is Sam Belloma in Pittston, Pennsylvania.

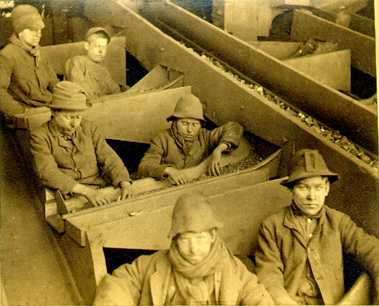
Breaker boys at the Eagle Hill colliery near Pottsville, Pennsylvania. George Bretz photo, 1884.

A breaker boy was a coal-mining worker in the United States and United Kingdom whose job was to separate impurities from coal by hand in a coal breaker.

Although breaker boys were primarily children, elderly coal miners who could no longer work in the mines because of age, disease, or accident were sometimes employed as breaker boys. The use of breaker boys began in the mid-1860s. Although public disapproval of the employment of children as breaker boys existed by the mid-1880s, the practice did not end until the early 1920s.

== Coal breaking ==
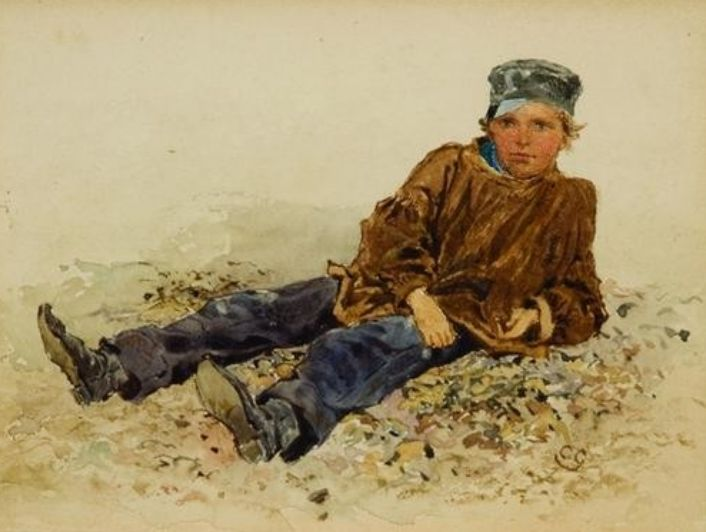
"Breaker boy" by Charles Green

Coal came into wide use in the late 1590s in the Kingdom of England after the island was widely deforested and a ban was placed on the harvesting of wood by Charles I of England, so that forests could be used solely by the Royal Navy. A newly emergent middle class increasingly demanded glass for windows, and the glass-making industry relied heavily on charcoal for fuel. With charcoal no longer available, the glass industry turned to coal. Demand for coal also increased after the invention of the reverberatory furnace and the development of methods for casting iron objects such as cannons.

The first function of a coal breaker was to break coal into pieces and sort the pieces into categories of nearly uniform size, a process known as breaking. Coal is often mixed with impurities such as rock, slate, sulfur, ash (or "bone"), clay, or soil. The second function of a coal breaker was to remove as many impurities as economically desirable and technologically feasible, and then grade the coal based on the percent of impurities remaining.

In the US prior to 1830, very little bituminous coal was mined and the fuel of the early American Industrial Revolution—anthracite coal—underwent little processing before being sent to market, which was primarily ironworks and smithies producing wrought iron. The miner himself would use a sledgehammer to break up large lumps of coal, then use a rake whose teeth were set two inches apart to collect the larger pieces of coal for shipment to the surface.

The smaller lumps of coal were considered non-marketable and left in the mine. Beginning about 1830, surface processing of coal in the US began concurrently with various canal projects in the Eastern Seaboard. These developments lagged behind that of Great Britain, better matching the timing of similar developments in Continental Europe. Great Britain, with its heavily deforested landscapes, simply had to find economic alternatives sooner, stimulating coal, iron, and machine developments leading ultimately to railroads and the infant industrial chemicals industries of the 1860s.

Lumps of coal were placed on plates of perforated cast iron. "Breakers" would hammer on the coal until it was in pieces small enough to fall through the holes. A second screen caught the coal, and it was shaken, by hand, animal, steam, or water power to remove the unmarketable smaller lumps. This "broken and screened" coal was worth much more than "broken" coal or lump coal.

== Use of breaker boys ==
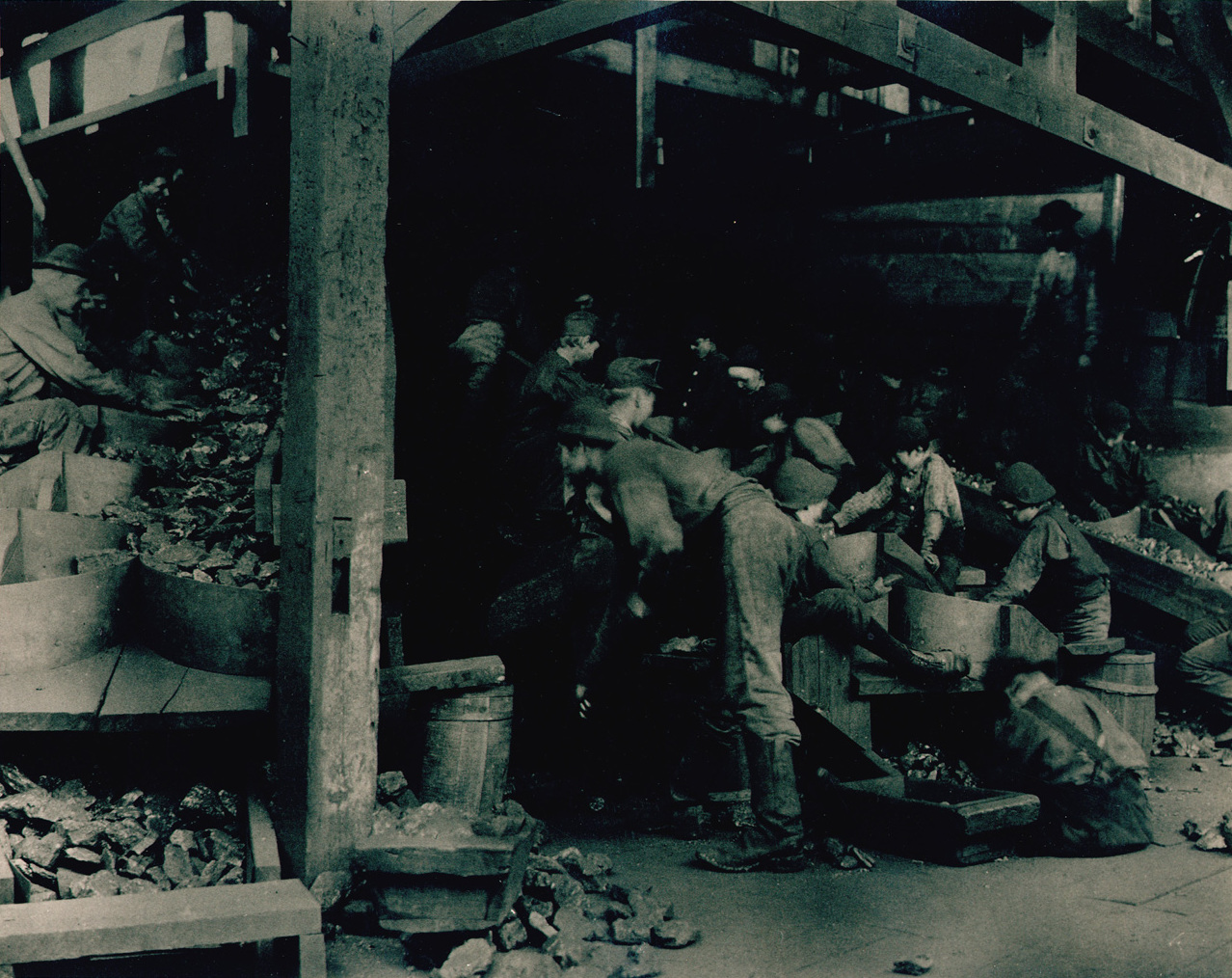
Breaker boys in the 1880s picking slate from coal at a coal breaker in Pottsville, Pennsylvania. Photo by George Bretz, 1880s

Until about 1900, nearly all coal breaking facilities in the United States were labor-intensive. The removal of impurities was done by hand, usually by breaker boys between the ages of 8 and 12 years old. The use of breaker boys began around 1866. For 10 hours a day, six days a week, breaker boys would sit on wooden seats, perched over the chutes and conveyor belts, picking slate and other impurities out of the coal. Breaker boys working on top of chutes or conveyor belts would stop the coal by pushing their boots into the stream of fuel flowing beneath them, briefly pick out the impurities, and then let the coal pass on to the next breaker boy for further processing. Others would divert coal into a horizontal chute at which they sat, then pick the coal clean before allowing the fuel to flow into clean coal bins.

The work performed by breaker boys was hazardous. Breaker boys were forced to work without gloves so that they could better handle the slick coal. The slate was sharp, and breaker boys would often leave work with their fingers cut and bleeding. Breaker boys sometimes had their fingers amputated by the rapidly moving conveyor belts. Others lost feet, hands, arms, and legs as they moved among the machinery and became caught under conveyor belts or in gears. Many were crushed to death, their bodies retrieved from the gears of the machinery by supervisors only at the end of the working day. Others were caught in the rush of coal, and crushed to death or smothered. Dry coal would kick up so much dust that breaker boys sometimes wore lamps on their heads to see. Asthma and black lung disease were common. Coal was often washed to remove impurities, which created sulfuric acid. The acid burned the hands of the breaker boys.

== Public condemnation ==
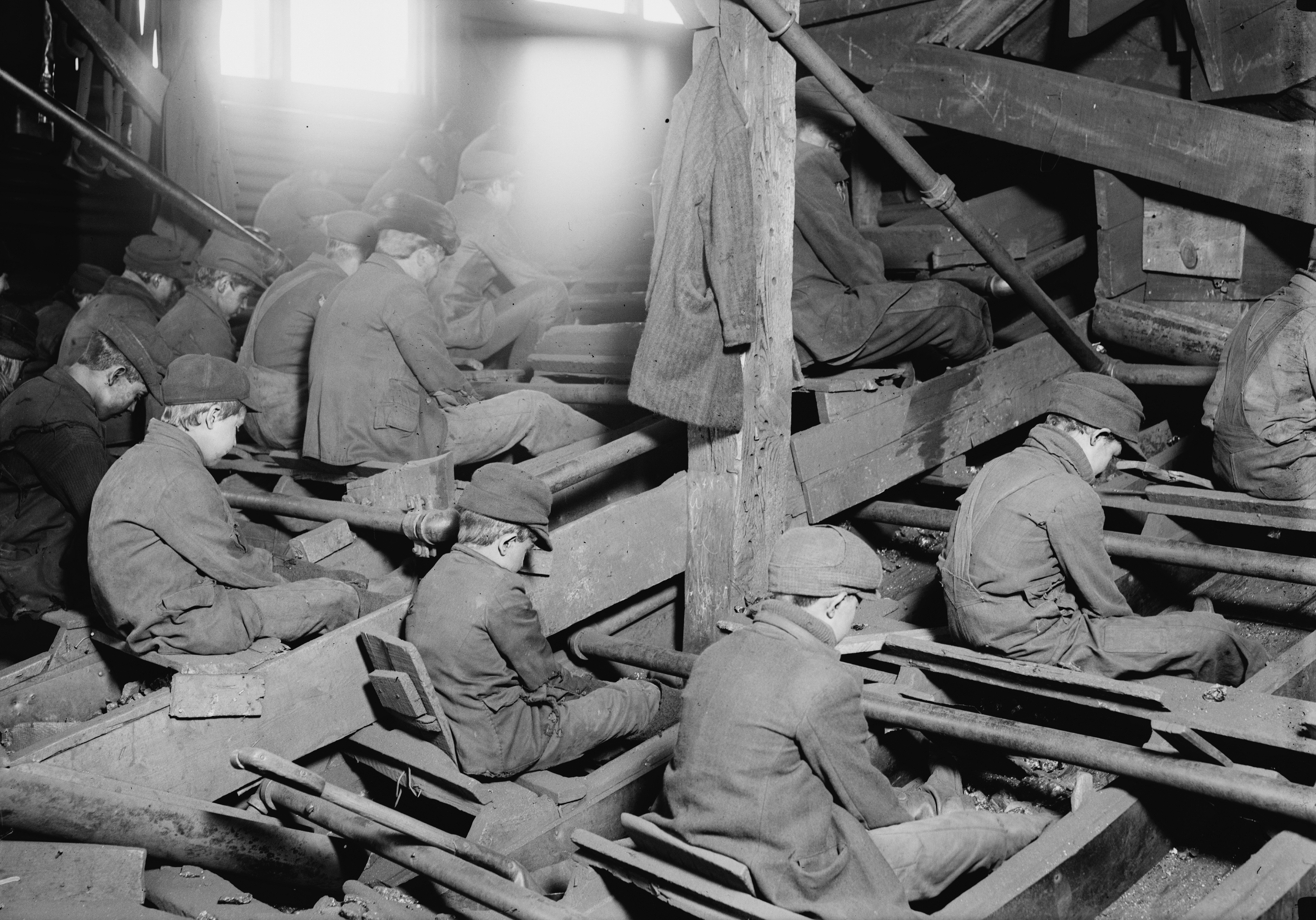
Breaker boys sort coal in an anthracite coal breaker near South Pittston, Pennsylvania, 1911.

Public condemnation of the use of breaker boys was so widespread, that in 1885 Pennsylvania enacted a law forbidding the employment of anyone under the age of 12 from working in a coal breaker. The law was poorly enforced. Many employers forged proof-of-age documentation, and many families forged birth certificates or other documents so their children could support the family. Estimates of the number of breaker boys at work in the anthracite coal fields of Pennsylvania vary widely, and official statistics are generally considered by historians to undercount the numbers significantly.

One estimate had 20,000 breaker boys working in the state in 1880, 18,000 working in 1900, 13,133 working in 1902, and 24,000 working in 1907. Technological innovations in the 1890s and 1900s, such as mechanical and water separators designed to remove impurities from coal, dramatically lowered the need for breaker boys, but adoption of the new technology was slow.

By the 1910s, the use of breaker boys was dropping because of improvements in technology, stricter child labor laws, and the enactment of compulsory education laws. The practice of employing children in coal breakers largely ended by 1920 because of the efforts of the National Child Labor Committee, sociologist and photographer Lewis Hine, and the National Consumers League, all of whom educated the public about the practice and succeeded in obtaining passage of national child labor laws.

== Union activities ==
Breaker boys were known for their fierce independence and rejection of adult authority. Breaker boys often formed and joined trade unions, and precipitated a number of important strikes in the anthracite coal fields of Pennsylvania. Among these were the strike which culminated in the Lattimer massacre and the Anthracite coal strike of 1902.
