= Mahanoy City, Pennsylvania =

Borough in Pennsylvania, US

- Borough
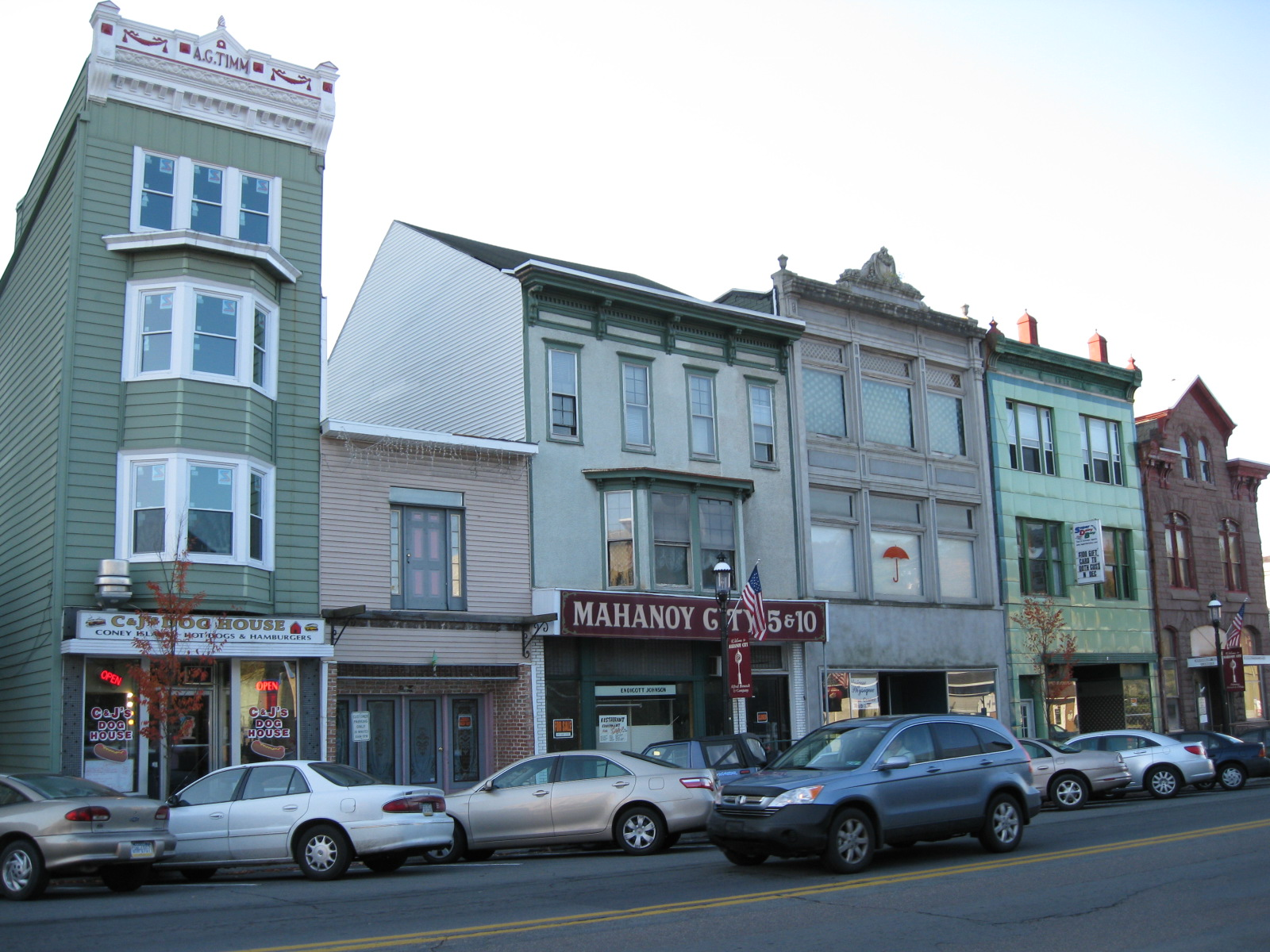
- Mahanoy City, Pennsylvania, October 2009

- Seal

- Location of Mahanoy City in Schuylkill County, Pennsylvania.

- Location in Pennsylvania Mahanoy City (the United States)
- Coordinates: 40°48′45″N 76°08′28″W
- Country: United States
- State: Pennsylvania
- County: Schuylkill
- Settled: 1859
- Incorporated: December 16, 1863

Government
  - Type: Home Rule Charter
  - Borough Manager: John Fatula
  - Council President: Michael Connolly

Area
  - Total: 0.51 sq mi (1.32 km^{2})
  - Land: 0.51 sq mi (1.32 km^{2})
  - Water: 0 sq mi (0.00 km^{2})
- Elevation: 1,240 ft (380 m)

Population (2020)
  - Total: 3,499
  - Density: 6,864.8/sq mi (2,650.51/km^{2})
- Time zone: UTC-5 (Eastern (EST))
  - Summer (DST): UTC-4 (EDT)
- ZIP code: 17948
- Area code: 570
- FIPS code: 42-46592
- Website: www.mahanoycity.org

Mahanoy City (Note: pronounced /ˈmɑːˌhɑːnɔɪ/ (MAH-hah-noy), formally Mahanoy City Borough or Borough of Mahanoy City) is a borough located 38 miles (61 km) southwest of Wilkes-Barre and 13 miles southwest of Hazleton, in northern Schuylkill County, Pennsylvania, United States. It is part of the Coal Region of Pennsylvania and is surrounded by (but not part of) Mahanoy Township.

As of the 2020 census, Mahanoy City had a population of 3,499.

The name Mahanoy (Note: Known to be pronounced /ˈmɒhɒnɔɪ/ or /ˈmɒ(hɒ)nɔɪ/ in the 21st century; known to have been pronounced both that way and /ˈmɒkənɔɪ/ by Coal Region natives in the 19th and 20th centuries, although the latter pronunciation may now be waning and may now in some cases be a hypercorrection by people who take pride in knowing it as a shibboleth.) is believed to be a variation of the Delaware word Maghonioy, or "the salt deposits".

== History ==
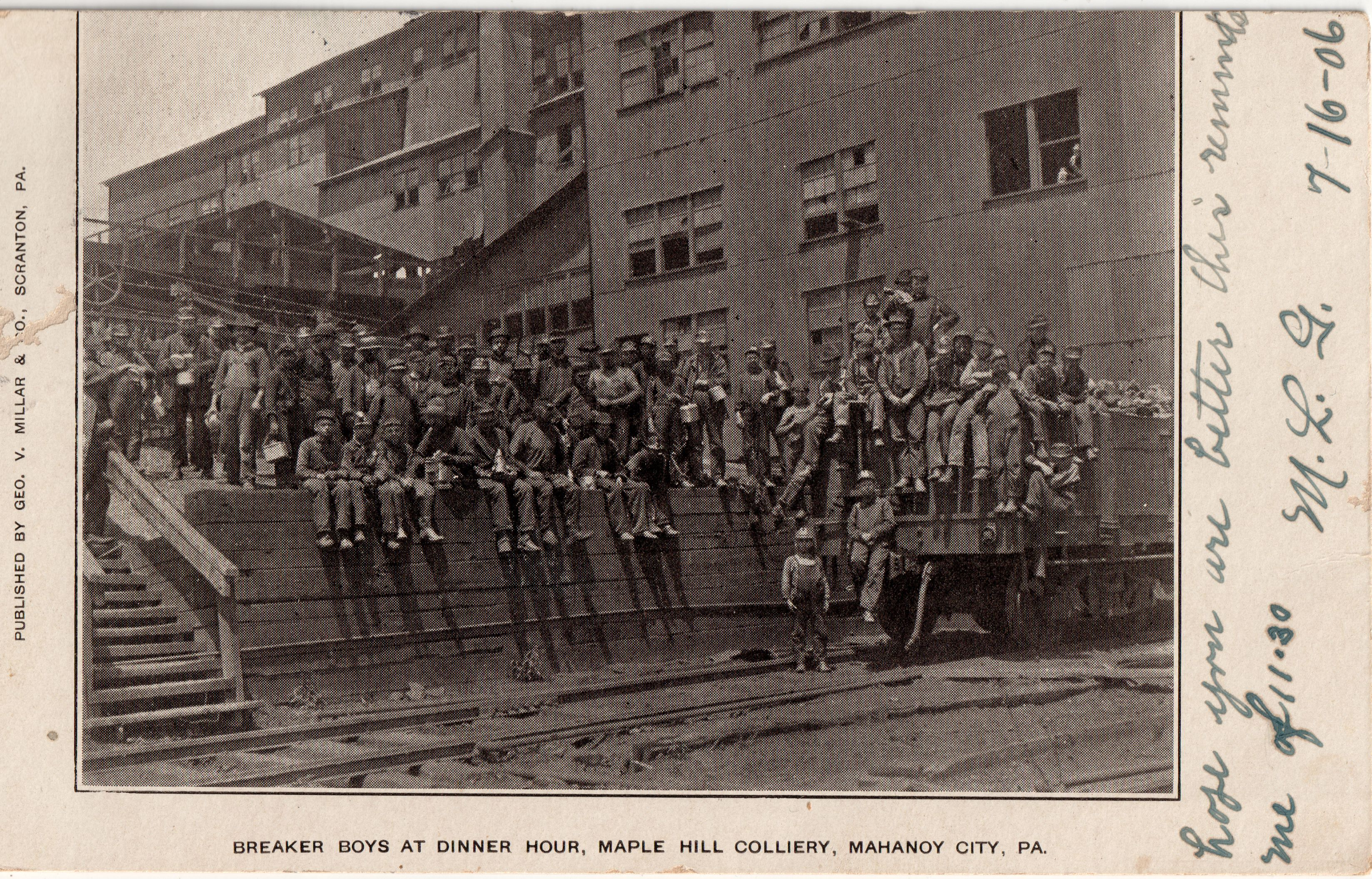
Breaker boys at dinner hour, Maple Hill Colliery, Mahanoy City, PA in 1908

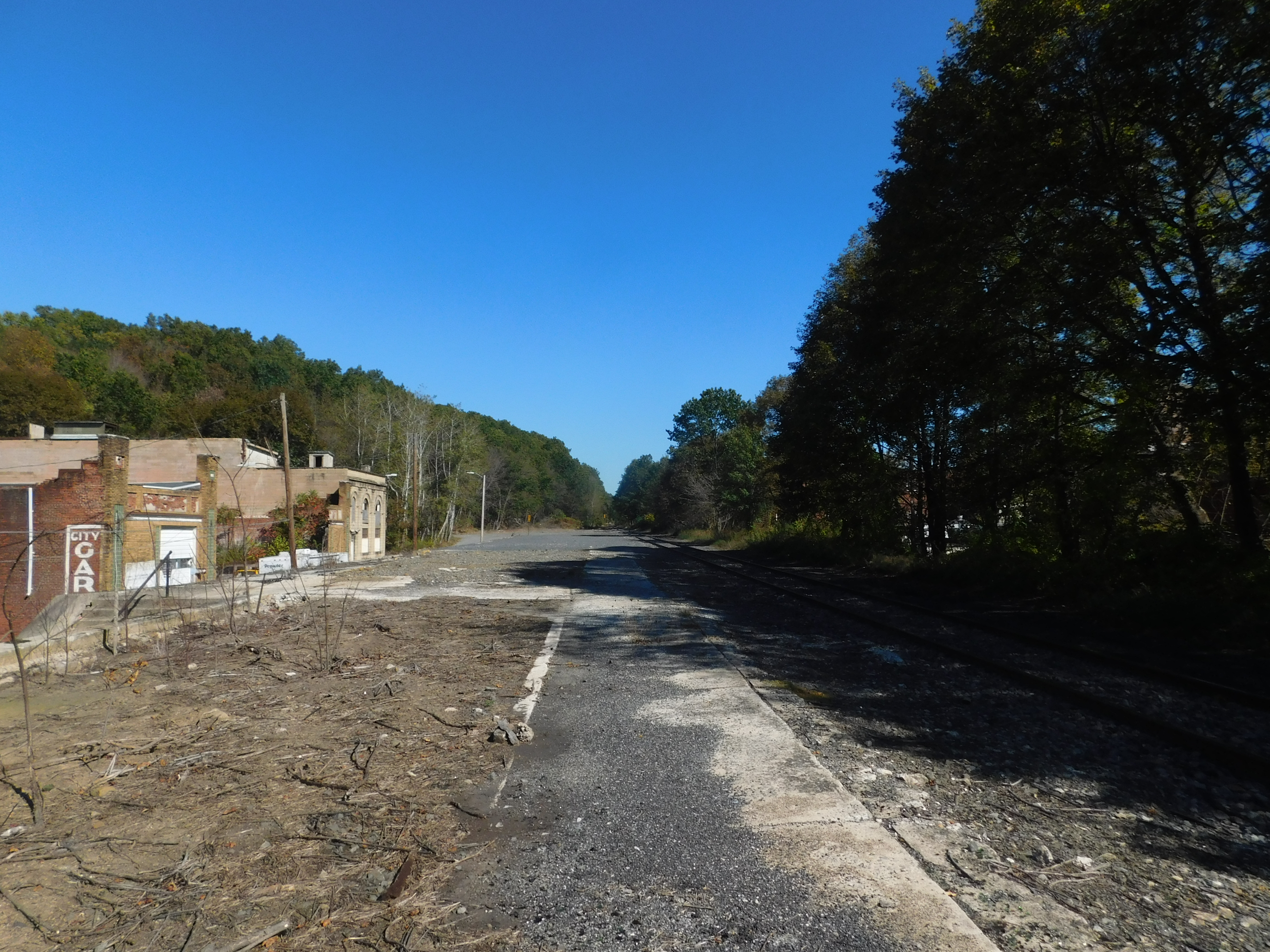
Mahanoy City's Reading Railroad station abandoned platform in October 2025

Mahanoy City lies in a valley in the Pennsylvania Coal Region and was a major center of anthracite production; the area was embroiled in the Molly Maguires incidents. In 2010, the borough erected the Molly Maguire Historic Park, which features a Zenos Frudakis statue of a hooded miner on a gallows about to be hanged. The borough's principal industries remain the mining and shipping of coal, although the demand for it has steadily declined since its peak in the late nineteenth and early twentieth centuries. In 1930 the St. Nicholas Breaker was built and went into operation in 1932. A controlled explosion destroyed the breaker in March 2018.

External audio
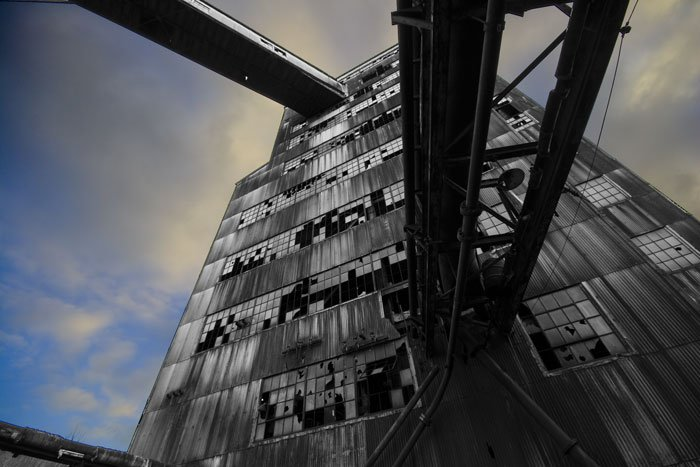
- St. Nicholas Coal Breaker in 2007
- Mahanoy City, The End of Coal Country, 36:23, Grapple, Keystone Crossroads

In 1948, Mahanoy City became the first municipality in the country to have cable television.

== Geography ==
Mahanoy City is located at 40°48′45″N 76°8′25″W (40.812413, -76.140223), with PA 54 as a main thoroughfare and through road, serving as a main street named Centre Street. To the west it connects to Shenandoah thence to the Susquehanna Valley and to the east reaches through several unincorporated villages then passes through Barnesville as Pine Creek Dr. and then serves Hometown as a main road, intersecting PA 309 (N-S) before passing into Tamaqua and Nesquehoning. The borough is situated in the valley of Mahanoy Creek, approximately 4 miles (6.4 km) southeast of Shenandoah and 11 miles (18 km) west-northwest of Tamaqua, both of which are reached via Route 54. Mahanoy City lies at an elevation of 1,240 feet (380 m) above sea level; Broad Mountain (1,795 feet (547 m)), a ridge extending through Schuylkill County, overlooks it on the southeast.

According to the United States Census Bureau, the borough has a total area of 0.5 square miles (1.3 km^{2}), all land. It has a warm-summer humid continental climate (Dfb) and average temperatures range from 24.3 °F in January to 69.3 °F in July. The hardiness zone is borderline between 5b and 6a, meaning that the approximate average annual absolute minimum temperature is -10 °F.

== Demographics ==
Historical population
Census	Pop.	Note	%±
1870	5,533		—
1880	7,181		29.8%
1890	11,286		57.2%
1900	13,504		19.7%
1910	15,936		18.0%
1920	15,599		−2.1%
1930	14,784		−5.2%
1940	13,442		−9.1%
1950	10,934		−18.7%
1960	8,536		−21.9%
1970	7,257		−15.0%
1980	6,167		−15.0%
1990	5,209		−15.5%
2000	4,647		−10.8%
2010	4,162		−10.4%
2020	3,499		−15.9%
2021 (est.)	3,513	▲	0.4%

=== 2020 census ===
As of the 2020 census, Mahanoy City had a population of 3,499. The median age was 41.8 years. 22.9% of residents were under the age of 18 and 21.2% of residents were 65 years of age or older. For every 100 females there were 94.1 males, and for every 100 females age 18 and over there were 94.8 males age 18 and over.

98.7% of residents lived in urban areas, while 1.3% lived in rural areas.

There were 1,482 households in Mahanoy City, of which 27.9% had children under the age of 18 living in them. Of all households, 29.8% were married-couple households, 25.6% were households with a male householder and no spouse or partner present, and 36.1% were households with a female householder and no spouse or partner present. About 37.9% of all households were made up of individuals and 22.4% had someone living alone who was 65 years of age or older.

There were 2,195 housing units, of which 32.5% were vacant. The homeowner vacancy rate was 4.3% and the rental vacancy rate was 14.9%.

Racial composition as of the 2020 census
Race	Number	Percent
White	2,854	81.6%
Black or African American	79	2.3%
American Indian and Alaska Native	14	0.4%
Asian	15	0.4%
Native Hawaiian and Other Pacific Islander	0	0.0%
Some other race	293	8.4%
Two or more races	244	7.0%
Hispanic or Latino (of any race)	581	16.6%

=== 2000 census ===
As of the census of 2000, there were 4,647 people, 2,113 households, and 1,210 families residing in the borough. The population density was 9,060.8 inhabitants per square mile (3,498.4/km^{2}). There were 2,595 housing units at an average density of 5,059.8 per square mile (1,953.6/km^{2}). The racial makeup of the borough was 98.79% White, 0.22% African American, 0.09% Native American, 0.22% Asian, 0.22% from other races, and 0.47% from two or more races. Hispanic or Latino of any race were 1.29% of the population.

There were 2,113 households, out of which 22.7% had children under the age of 18 living with them, 37.2% were married couples living together, 13.8% had a female householder with no husband present, and 42.7% were non-families. 39.5% of all households were made up of individuals, and 24.9% had someone living alone who was 65 years of age or older. The average household size was 2.20 and the average family size was 2.92.

In the borough the population was spread out, with 21.3% under the age of 18, 6.8% from 18 to 24, 24.9% from 25 to 44, 21.0% from 45 to 64, and 26.0% who were 65 years of age or older. The median age was 43 years. For every 100 females, there were 89.3 males. For every 100 females age 18 and over, there were 84.6 males.

The median income for a household in the borough was $24,347, and the median income for a family was $32,033. Males had a median income of $29,628 versus $20,288 for females. The per capita income for the borough was $14,369. About 12.6% of families and 17.4% of the population were below the poverty line, including 22.3% of those under age 18 and 20.9% of those age 65 or over.

== Education ==
Mahanoy Area School District serves the borough and includes an elementary, middle school, and high school complex for students.

== Transportation ==
Schuylkill Transportation System operates the #51 bus to/from Pottsville

There is a route in the Uptown Vans network which connects Mahanoy City to Paterson, New Jersey and New York City.

== Notable people ==
- Joe Boley (1896–1962), baseball player
- Joe Dugan (1897–1982), baseball player
- David Huebner (born 1960), lawyer and diplomat
- Joseph Edward Kurtz (born 1946), prelate
- Paul Marks (1926–2020), oncologist
- Jack McCloskey (1925–2017), basketball player and coach
- John P. Morris (1926–2002), trade unionist
- Ron Northey (1920–1971), baseball player
- James J. Rhoades (1941–2008), politician
- Kevin C. Rhoades (born 1957), bishop
- Mike Rhoades (born 1972), basketball coach
- Victor Schertzinger (1890–1941), composer, film director, producer, and screenwriter
- George Senesky (1922–2001), basketball player and coach
- John Walson, (1915–1993), inventor
