= Luca Sestak =

German pianist and jazz musician

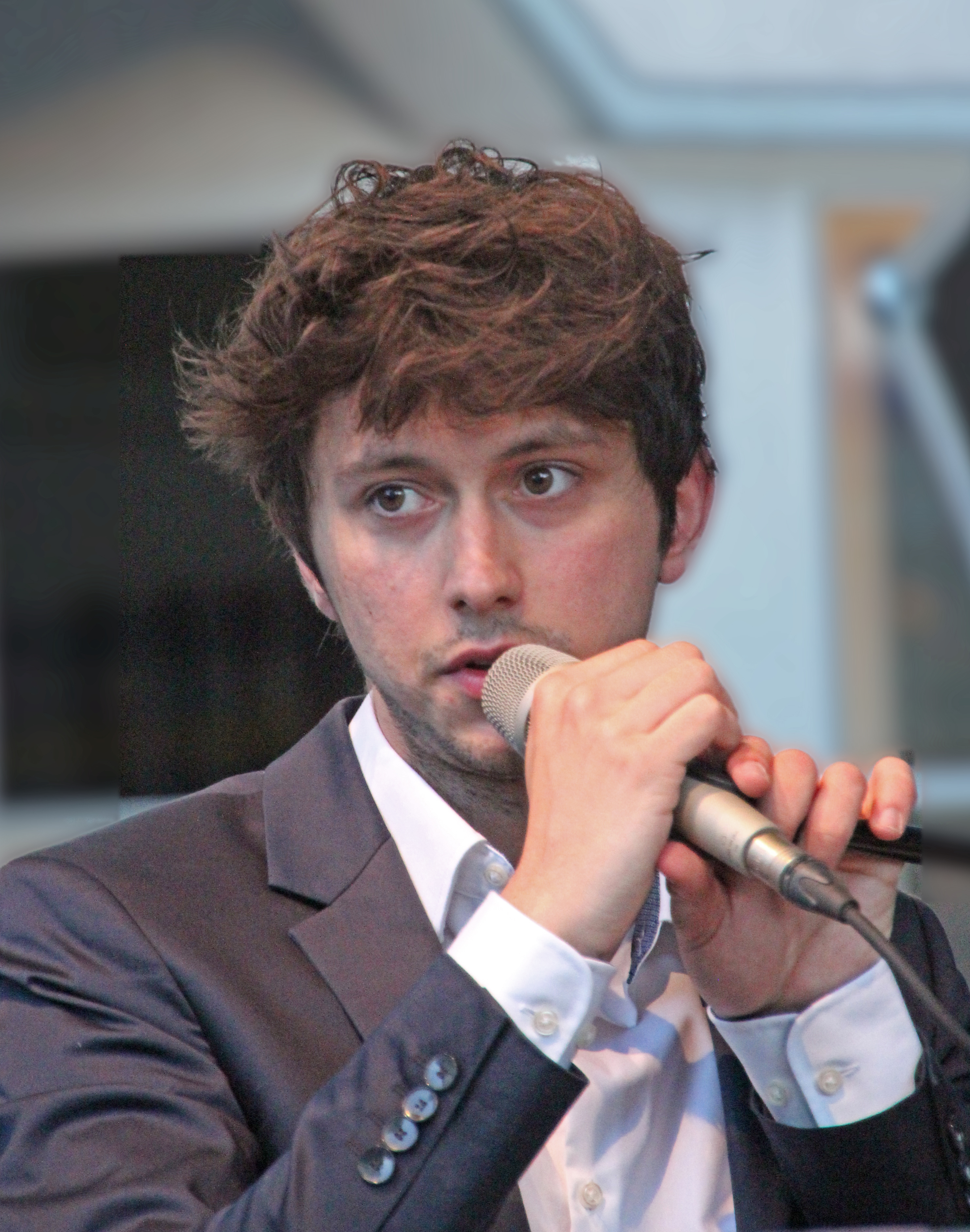
Sestak in 2017

Luca Sestak (born January 10, 1995, in Celle, Lower Saxony, Germany) is a German blues and jazz-pop pianist, singer and composer.

== Musical career ==
Sestak began playing piano at a young age. In 2012 he told Birgitta Larsson of "Jefferson Blues Magazine":

"My father tried to teach me a little piano playing when I was 8, but I hated it. When I was nine and a half he sent me to a piano teacher. I didn’t like classical music at all. At eleven and a half, after two years of lessons, I was supposed to play a Beethoven sonata. It was after this point that playing the piano began to really give me pleasure. Today, however, my relating to classical music is diminishing again; to be honest, it isn’t easy to run on two tracks and my heart beats much louder for the blues."

After two years of classical piano lessons Sestak discovered jazz and blues music, in particular boogie-woogie, through YouTube. Immediately captivated by this musical style, he began to teach himself blues piano while still taking classical lessons. In December 2006, he shared his first videos on YouTube which brought him public fame. In 2007, at the age of 12, Sestak visited the International Boogie Woogie Festival at Lugano, Switzerland, where he knew Axel Zwingenberger would perform.

By March 2014 his earliest videos had received as many as 1.8 million hits. After public appearances in his home town of Karlsruhe, Sestak's fame continued to grow through videos. As he grew older, he began performing regularly in concerts and festivals in Germany, Austria, Switzerland, France, Sweden, Italy, Belgium, the Netherlands, the US and other countries.

In 2010 Sestak appeared on German TV for the first time in “Kaffee oder Tee” on SWR.

After Sony Music discovered Sestak in 2019, he signed a record deal with the major label to release his third album Right or Wrong in 2020 and went on tour with British musician Tanita Tikaram. The album is heavily influenced by pop music and Jazz and was compared to artists like Jamie Cullum.

== Discography ==
- 2010: Lost in Boogie (solo CD)
- 2014: New Way (solo CD)
- 2020: Right or Wrong
- 2024: Lighter Notes (trio CD)

== Awards ==
- 2008: "Jugend musiziert" contest in Karlsruhe. 1st prize with promotion to "State Contest"
- 2008: "Jugend musiziert" State Contest Baden-Württemberg, 3rd prize
- 2011: German Pinetop Award 2011 “Discovery of the Year"
- 2012: "SummerJazz" Prize of SummerJazz festival in Pinneberg, Germany
- 2012: Yamaha Junior Generation Prize/Promotion Prize
