= Mahanoy Area High School =

Mahanoy Area Junior Senior High School
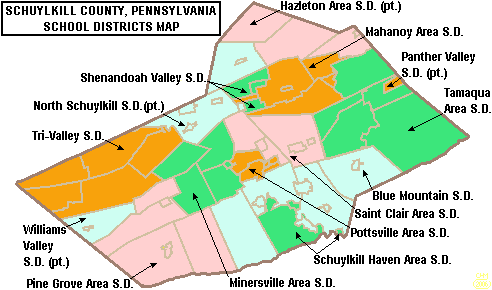
- Map of school districts in Schuylkill County, Pennsylvania

Location
- 1 Golden Bear Drive; Mahanoy City, Schuylkill County, Pennsylvania 17948; United States

Information
- Type: Public high school
- Principal: Stanley Sabol Jr.
- Grades: 7-12
- Enrollment: 536 (2023–2024)
- Mascot: Golden Bear
- Website: http://www.mabears.net/

Mahanoy Area Junior Senior High School is located at 1 Golden Bear Drive in Mahanoy City, Pennsylvania. In 2023, enrollment was 536 pupils in grades 9th-12.

== Extracurriculars ==
Mahanoy Area High School offers a wide variety of clubs, activities, and an extensive sports program.

=== Sports ===
Mahanoy Area High School sports include:

Boys

- Baseball - AA
- Basketball- AA
- Cross country - A
- Football - AA
- Golf - AA
- Swimming and diving - AA
- Track and field - AA
- Wrestling - AA

Girls

- Basketball - AA
- Cross country - A
- Golf - AA
- Softball - A
- Swimming and diving - AA
- Track and field - AA
- Volleyball - A

According to PIAA directory July 2016
