= Arthur B. Shostak =

American sociologist (born 1937)

- Born: May 11, 1937 (age 88); Brooklyn, New York, U.S.
- Education: BA (1958), PhD (1961)
- Alma mater: Cornell University (1954–1958); Princeton University (1958–1961)
- Occupation(s): Sociologist, futurist
- Known for: Futuristics, Sociology, Holocaust Scholarship
- Notable work: Stealth Altruism: Forbidden care as Jewish resistance in the Holocaust (2017)
- Spouse: lynn seng
- Awards: Woodrow Wilson Fellowship, German Marshall Fund, Social Science Research Council, Ford Foundation Fellowship, American Sociological Association Distinguished Career for the Practice of Sociology Award, Drexel University Lifetime Achievement Award

Arthur Benett Shostak (born May 11, 1937) is an American sociologist and futurist, and former professor of sociology at Drexel University. His research areas include futuristics, the history and future of the American work force, organized labor, industrial sociology, the management and social implications of modern technology, and Holocaust scholarship.

== Biography ==
Born in Brooklyn, in 1937, Shostak received his Bachelor of Science degree in Industrial and Labor Relations at Cornell University in 1958. In 1961, he received his Ph.D. in Industrial Sociology at Princeton and began teaching at Wharton School of Finance and Commerce at the University of Pennsylvania until 1967. He became professor of sociology at Drexel where he taught courses on the effects of technology, industrial and urban sociology, and race and ethnic relations. In 1975, he began serving as an adjunct sociologist with the National Labor College and AFL-CIO George Meany Center for Labor Studies until 2000. Alongside professorship, he was director of the Drexel University Center for Employment. He was also a longtime participant in the World Future Society of futurists where he headed the Philadelphia chapter until 2003. In 2003, Shostak retired from Drexel. In 2006, he began work as a Holocaust Scholar, and in 2017, he published "Stealth Altruism: Forbidden care as Jewish resistance in the Holocaust." Shostak continues to offer lectures and webinars on the subject.

== Work ==
Shostak's articles and books investigate a wide range of topics, all of which are mostly future oriented. Such topics include childhood and adolescent education, globalization, foreign policy, war and peace, information technology, bio, nano, and space technology, labor movements, utopias, and Holocaust scholarship.

=== Selected bibliography ===
- Blue-Collar Stress (1980)
- Men and Abortion: Lessons, Losses, and Love (1984)
- The Air Controllers' Controversy: Lessons from the PATCO Strike (1986)
- Robust Unionism: Innovations in the Labor Movement (1991)
- Guidelines from Gomberg: No-Nonsense Advice for Labor and Management (1992)
- For Labor's Sake: Labor Gains and Pains as Told by 28 Creative Inside Reformers (1994)
- Impacts of Changing Employment: If the Good Jobs Go Away (1996)
- Private Sociology: Unsparing Reflections, Uncommon Gains (1996)
- CyberUnion: Empowering Labor through Computer Technology (1999)
- Utopian Thinking in Sociology: Creating the Good Society (2001)
- The CyberUnion Handbook: Transforming Labor through Computer Technology (2002)
- Viable Utopian Ideas: Shaping a Better World (2003)
- Culture Clash/ Media Demons (2004)
- Trade Towers/War Clouds (2004)
- Making War/Making Peace (2004)
- Mopping Up/ Making Up (2004)
- Turning Point: The Rocky Road to Peace and Reconstruction (2004)
- Moving On: Far Ahead (2004)
- Getting Personal: Staying Ahead (2004)
- America: Moving Ahead (2004)
- Futuristics: Looking Ahead (2004)
- Anticipate the School You want: Futurizing K-12 Education (2008)
- Creating the School You Want: Learning @ tomorrow's edge (2010)
- Stealth Altruism: Forbidden care as Jewish resistance in the Holocaust (2017)
