= Seszták =

Seszták is a surname. It is a Hungarian respelling of the Czech and Slovak surname Šesták. Notable people with the surname include:

- Miklós Seszták (born 1968), Hungarian jurist and politician
- Oszkár Seszták (born 1965), Hungarian politician
