= Gerasim Shostakov =

Imperial Russian Army general (1756–1837)

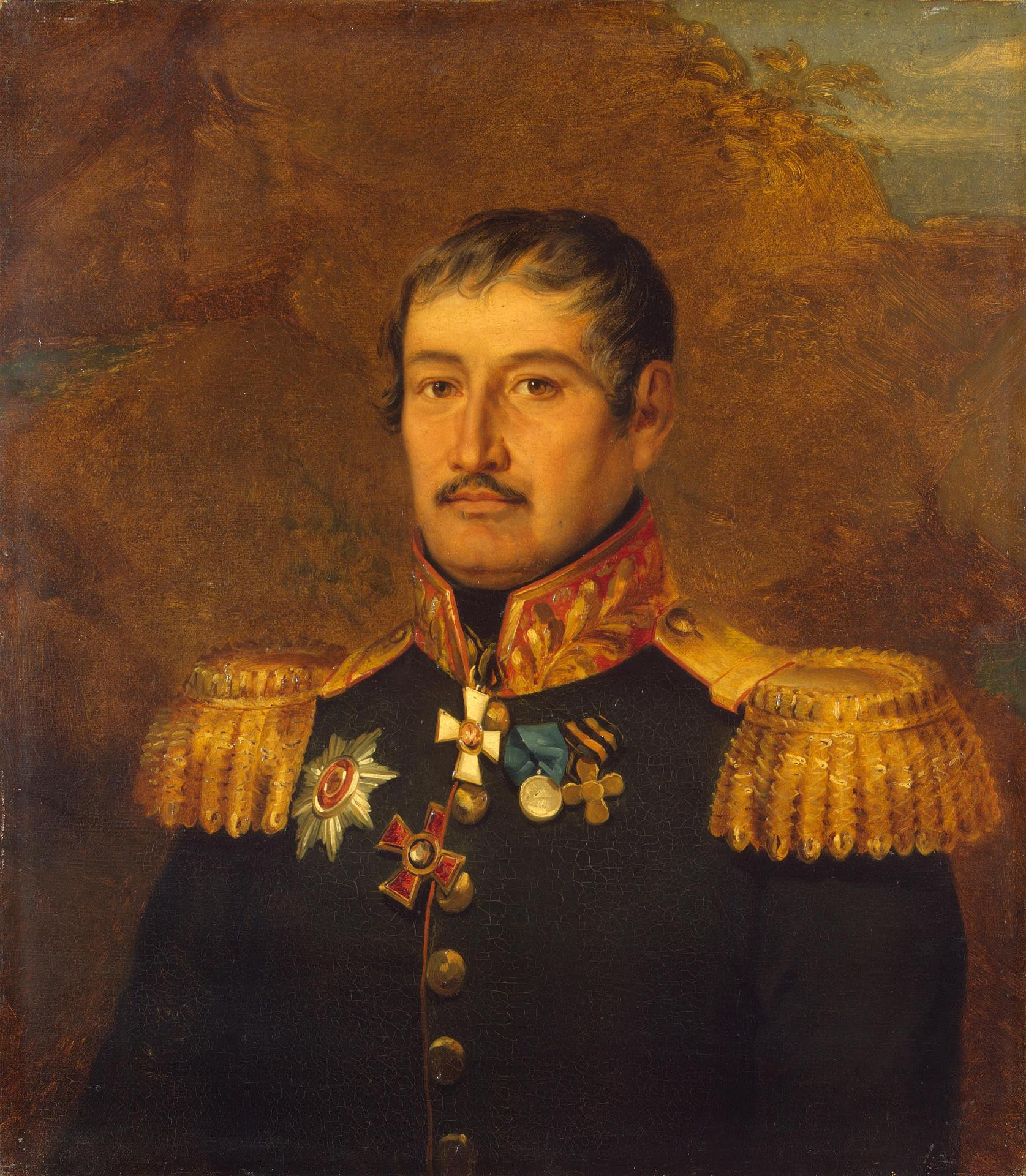
Gerasim Shostakov

Gerasim Shostakov (Russian: Герасим Алексеевич Шостаков); 1756–1837) was a Russian military commader during the Napoleonic Wars, a major general in the Imperial Russian Army, recipient of multiple military awards. He took part in the Russo-Turkish War (1787–1792), Polish–Russian War of 1792, suppression of the Kościuszko Uprising, fought against the French invasion of Russia and in the War of the Sixth Coalition.
