= Barnesville, Pennsylvania =

Unincorporated community in Pennsylvania, US

- Unincorporated community
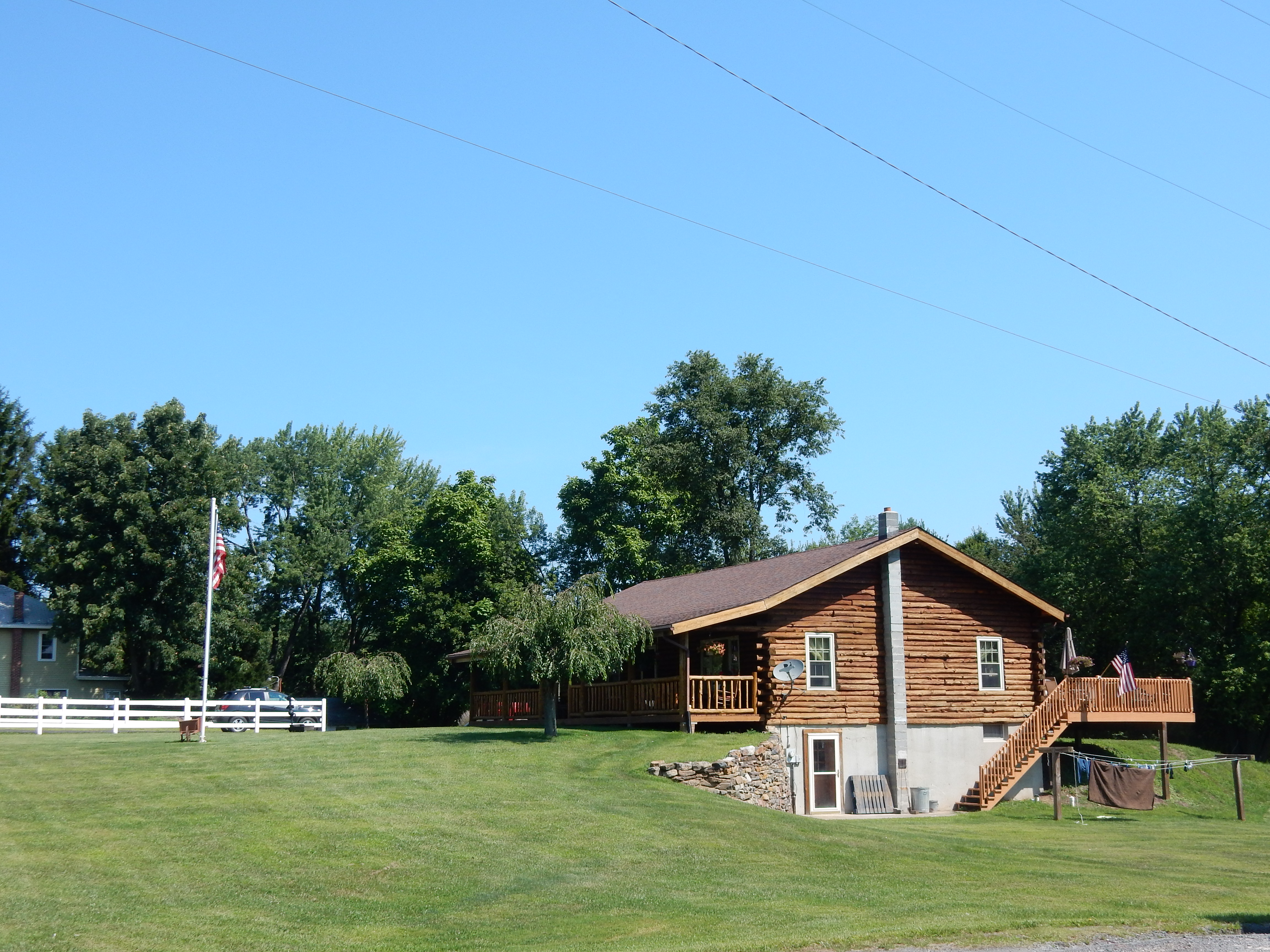
- Grier Avenue, Barnesville showing atypically level terrain in the main bedroom community atop the summit above the larger Tamaqua and Mahanoy City boroughs below the divide.

- Coordinates: 40.8170856°N 76.0469324°W
- Country: United States
- State: Pennsylvania
- County: Schuylkill

Area
  - Water: 0 sq mi (0 km^{2})
- Elevation: 1,122 ft (342 m)

Population (2010)
  - Total: 2,078
- Time zone: UTC-4 (EST)
  - Summer (DST): UTC-5 (EDT)
- ZIP Code: 18214
- Area code: 570

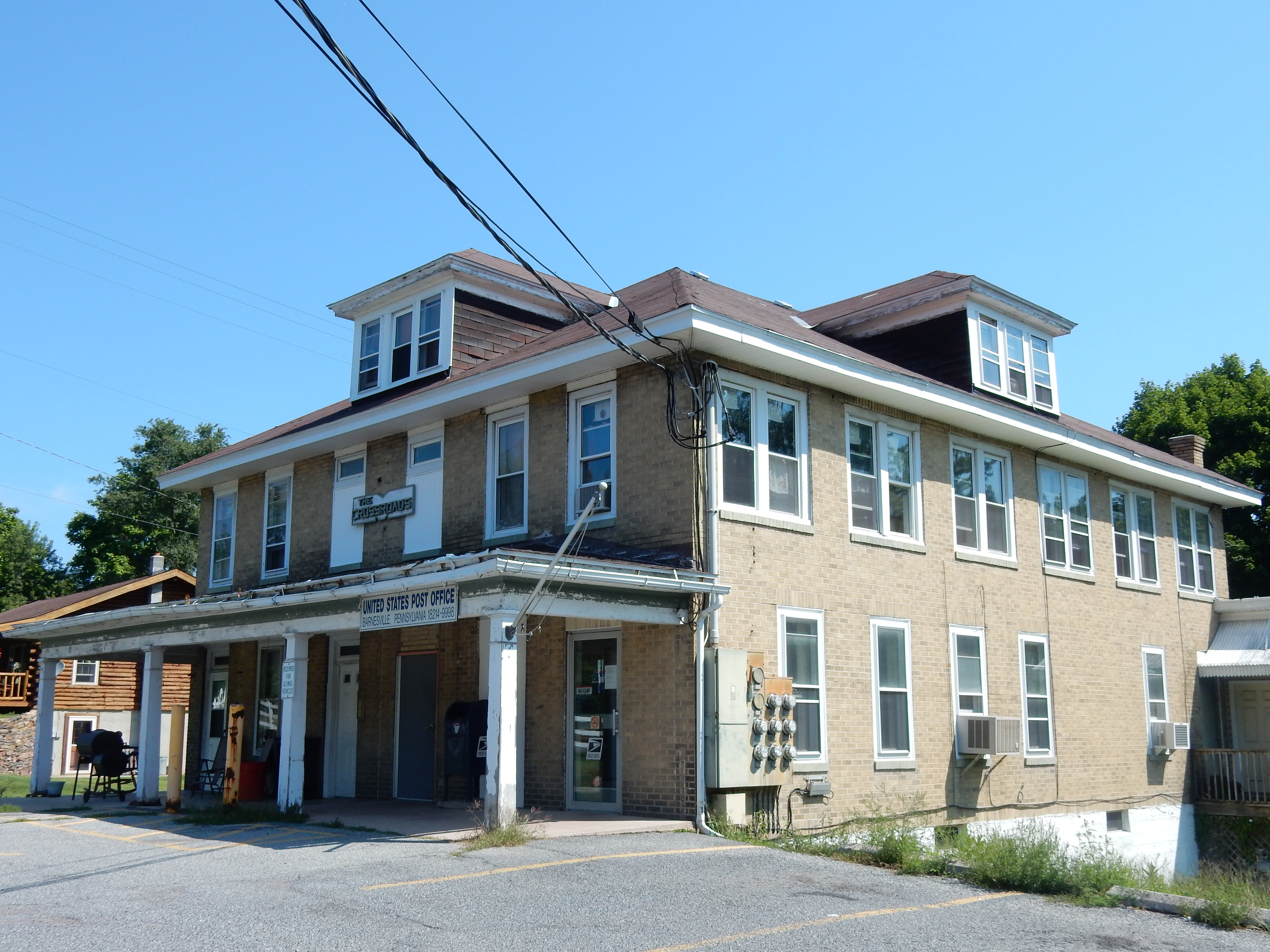
Post Office in Barnesville

Barnesville is an unincorporated community in Ryan Township, Pennsylvania, United States. Originally built to support nearby rust belt industries, the hamlet is between the center and eastern thirds of the Southern Anthracite Coal Region. The community is part of a wide-ranging township and is situated atop a summit and drainage divide flanked by two long climbs that are traversed by local transport infrastructure, railways with an important switching junction within the village, and Pennsylvania Route 54, which collects towns like beads on a string along a particular combination of connected valleys in the Ridge-and-Valley Appalachians.

John Faust, in 1806, first settled in Barnesville, followed by Abram L. Boughner who located near the same place in 1815. This village owes its origin to the building of the Little Schuylkill and Susquehanna - Catawissa Railroad, which was completed in 1854. Shortly thereafter, the first hotel was built by Jacob Faust and opened in 1854. The Little Schuylkill and Susquehanna Railroad, predecessor of the Catawissa Railroad, connected to the branch of the Little Schuylkill Railroad. This drove the development and growth of the village.

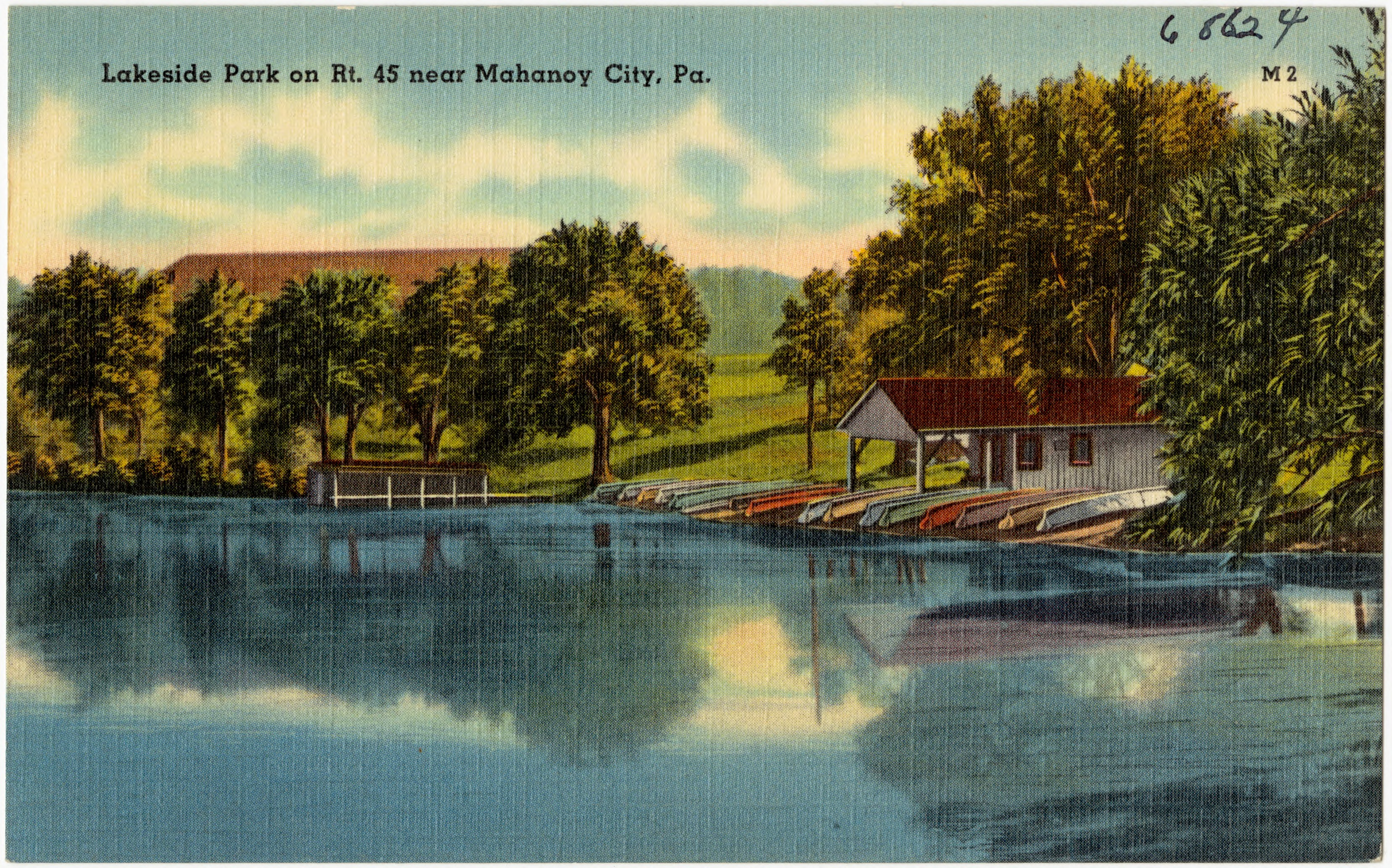
Lakeside Park

Barnesville is quite unique in that it was the home to two swimming lake/amusement parks. In 1880, Lakeside Park opened with two dams and a picnic ground. With easy access by train it became an entertainment center with a large hotel on the grounds, bathing houses bordering the lake, and cottages on the water. A roller-coaster was erected on the site in 1923 and other amusement rides were added. Finally a large ballroom was constructed. In 1916, competition came in the form of a new park a mile away—Lakewood.

That park, too, incorporated swimming, rides, a playhouse and, a Crystal Ballroom, opened in 1925, one year after Lakeside's. These ballrooms became Big Band-era entertainment meccas.

Eventually, Lakeside became a venue from 1964 to 1970 for popular dances hosted by The Jordan Brothers. Lakewood (which also hosted the Jordan Brothers dances for one year in 1964) later hosted The Bavarian Summer Festival beginning in 1969 which became one of the biggest draws in the coal region for 15 years. Lakeside Ballroom today is still used for entertainment. The (historical designated) building is roughly 28,000 SF with a 10,000 SF maple wooden dance floor that can host several thousand people.

The village located in the northeastern part of the state amidst gentle summit terrain after the long east–west climb up the Nesquehoning Creek valley, Barnesville was founded primarily as a railroad town with a watering depot for the Nesquehoning Railroad (and later the Nesquehoning and Mahanoy Railroad and Lehigh & Susquehanna Railroad) after its climb via the Pine Creek valley from Hometown, Nesquehoning, and Tamaqua to the east. These communities lie within the Southeastern Anthracite Coal Region.

Residents who live in Rush Township may attend either Tamaqua Area School District or Mahanoy Area School District, while Ryan Township residents attend Mahanoy Area School District. Barnesville includes Grier City, Hosensock, and Locust Valley.
