= Lehigh and Mahanoy Railroad =

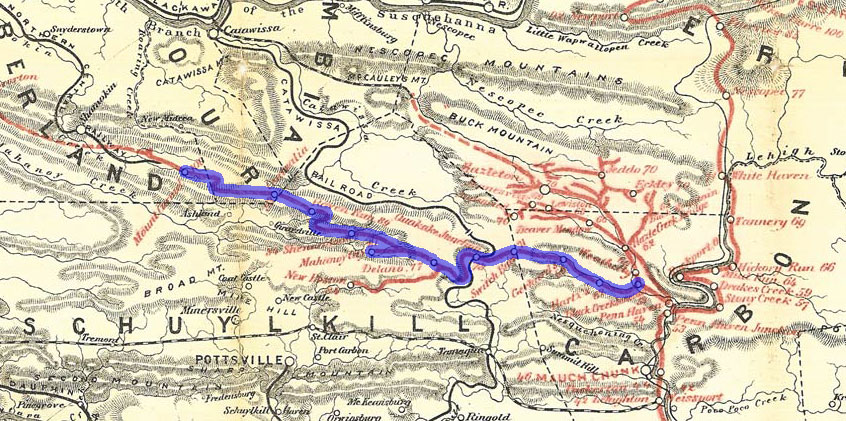
- 1870 map

Overview
- Locale: Northeastern Pennsylvania
- Dates of operation: 1862–1866
- Predecessor: Quakake Railroad
- Successor: Lehigh Valley Railroad

Technical
- Track gauge: 4 ft 8 1/2 in (1,435 mm)

The Lehigh and Mahanoy Railroad, originally the Quakake Railroad (pronounced quake-ache), was a rail line connecting Black Creek Junction in the Lehigh Valley region of eastern Pennsylvania with Quakake, Delano, and Mount Carmel. Opened from Black Creek Junction to Quakake in 1858 and to Mount Carmel in 1860, it allowed anthracite coal mined along the line and bridge traffic to be transported east tos New York City. After 1866, it was merged into the Lehigh Valley Railroad and named Mahanoy Branch.

== History ==
The Quakake Railroad was chartered on April 25, 1857 to build a connection between the Beaver Meadow Railroad, later the Lehigh Valley Railroad's Hazleton Branch, at Black Creek Junction, where Quakake Creek empties into Black Creek and the Catawissa, Williamsport and Erie Railroad between its two summit tunnels in Rush Township, Pennsylvania at Lofty Tunnel and Ryan's Tunnel. The CW&E's predecessor, the Little Schuylkill and Susquehanna Railroad, graded this route as its Quakake or Lehigh Branch and opened most of it for traffic in 1840. It was the only part of the LS&S to operate, but was abandoned it after a flood devastated the Beaver Meadow Railroad in January 1841. The Quakake Railroad's charter allowed it to occupy that grade with the consent of the CW&E.

Quakake Railroad's construction was supported by the CW&E, the Beaver Meadow, and the Lehigh Valley Railroads. Its completion allowed coal to be transported from the CW&E to travel over the latter two railroads to New York City. The original LS&S grading used an inclined plane to connect the later CW&E main line, on the mountainside between the two tunnels, with the Quakake Branch in the valley below. However, that plan and the inclined plane were abandoned prior to completion of the Quakake Railroad, and instead the junction was moved to the south to Quakake Junction, near Tamanend. The full line opened on August 25, 1858 from Black Creek Junction on the Beaver Meadow Railroad west to Quakake Junction on the CW&E, and was at first operated by that railroad.

A charter supplement issued on March 22, 1859 allowed the Quakake Railroad to extend its line westerly into the headwaters of Mahanoy Creek and down the stream or up its branches "as far as may be expedient", and build branches of up to 10 miles to coal mines. Under this authority, the Quakake built an extension in 1860 via Delano to Mount Carmel, where it connected to the Northern Central Railway's Shamokin Valley and Pottsville Railroad. Another charter supplement on March 21, 1860 allowed it to buy its roadbed from the CW&E, which was then being foreclosed and reorganized as the Catawissa Railroad.

The Quakake Railroad went into foreclosure on September 30, 1862, and was reorganized as the Lehigh and Mahanoy Railroad on October 11. In 1865, a branch was built from Park Place to Mahanoy City. On June 30, 1866 the company was merged into the Lehigh Valley Railroad.

Under the Lehigh & Mahanoy, the line between Raven Run and Centralia was completed in 1865. In 1866 it was built to Mount Carmel and connected to the Shamokin Valley and Pottsville Railroad owned by the Northern Central Railway. In 1884 the line, which lay low in the valley, was rebuilt higher up on the mountainside by the Lehigh Valley. This avoided flooding from Mine Run. A branch extended from Centralia eastward to the LV's Continental Colliery. It was abandoned when the colliery closed in 1954. A branch was built in 1877 from Kohinoor Junction through Girardville to Ashland. A two-mile switchback was built in 1939 from Logan Junction, west of Centralia to the Germantown Colliery. It as used until 1960 when that operation was closed. Two other extensions were built. In 1890, a one-mile line was constructed from Morris Ridge Junction, east of Mt. Carmel to the Midvalley No. 1 Colliery. In 1892, a three-mile line was built from Montana junction, east of Centralia, to Midvalley Colliery No. 2. These lines were abandoned by 1965 when the fine coal plant at Midvalley closed.

The decline of coal mining brought about the piecemeal abandonment of these lines. The Ashland Branch was cut back to Girardville in 1951, and in 1953, from Girardville to Weston Colliery. One mile of the Mahanoy City Branch was abandoned in 1957, and the line from Delano to Gerhards, Pennsylvania in 1963. The line to Mt. Carmel was cut back to Aristes Junction in 1965, and from there to Raven Run in 1971. The remaining trackage was all abandoned by 1976.

== See also ==
- List of Pennsylvania railroads
