= List of place names of Native American origin in Pennsylvania =

This is a list of Native American place names in the U.S. state of Pennsylvania.

Counties

- Erie County, Pennsylvania - named after the Erie people, an Iroquoian-speaking Native American tribe that inhabited the southern shore of Lake Erie.
- Juniata County, Pennsylvania - Named after the Juniata River. The name Juniata is believed to derive from a Seneca/Iroquoian term commonly interpreted as "people of the standing stone", though some sources have also translated it as "blue waters".
- Lackawanna County, Pennsylvania - Named after the Lackawanna River, whose name derives from a Lenape (Delaware) term commonly translated as "stream that forks".
- Lehigh County, Pennsylvania - Named after the Lehigh River, whose name derives from the Lenape term Lechauwekink (also rendered Lechewuekink), meaning "where there are forks" or "at the forks of a stream".
- Lycoming County, Pennsylvania - Named after Lycoming Creek, whose name derives from a Delaware (Lenape) word meaning "sandy or gravelly creek".
- Susquehanna County, Pennsylvania - Named after the Susquehanna River, which in turn was named for the Susquehannock people. The name has been translated as "people of the muddy river" and is derived from an Algonquian name for the Iroquoian-speaking Susquehannock.
- Tioga County, Pennsylvania - Named after the Tioga River. The name Tioga is derived from an Iroquoian word meaning "the forks of a stream" or "at the forks".
- Venango County, Pennsylvania - Named after Venango, the Native American name for French Creek. The name is derived from the Seneca word Onenge, meaning "otter".
- Wyoming County, Pennsylvania - Named after the Wyoming Valley. The name Wyoming derives from a Lenape word commonly translated as "at the big river flat" or "large plains".

Bodies of Water

- Allegheny River - * Allegheny River – The name Allegheny is derived from the Lenape language and is commonly interpreted as meaning "beautiful stream" or "fine river".
- Catawissa Creek - The name Catawissa is derived from a Lenape (Delaware) word that has been translated as "pure stream", "clear stream", or "swiftly flowing water".
- Canadohta Lake
- Conemaugh River - The name ''Conemaugh'' is derived from the Unami Lenape word ''Kxënemahële'', meaning "otter".
- Conneaut Lake
- Conodoguinet Creek
- Juniata River
- Kiskiminetas River
- Lackawanna River
- Lake Wynonah
- Loyalhanna Creek
- Lycoming Creek
- Monongahela River
- Muckinipattis Creek
- Pennypack Creek
- Ohio River
- Pymatuning Reservoir
- Quittapahilla Creek
- Sinnemahoning Creek
- Susquehanna River
- Swatara Creek
- Tioga River
- Tulpehocken Creek (Pennsylvania)
- Wiconisco Creek
- Wissahickon Creek
- Youghiogheny River

Settlements

- Aliquippa, Pennsylvania
- Analomink
- Aquashicola
- Catasauqua, Pennsylvania
- Chillisquaque
- Cocolamus
- Connoquenessing, Pennsylvania
- Conshohocken, Pennsylvania
- Coplay
- Hokendauqua
- Keewaydin
- Kingsessing
- Kittanning, Pennsylvania
- Lahaska
- Lackawaxen
- Lehighton
- Lenape Heights, Pennsylvania
- Loyalsock
- Macungie
- Mahanoy City
- Manatawny, Pennsylvania
- Manayunk, Philadelphia
- Mauch Chunk
- Maxatawny
- Mehoopany
- Meniolagomeka
- Meshoppen
- Mocanaqua
- Moshannon
- Muncy, Pennsylvania
- Nanticoke
- Nemacolin
- Nescopeck
- Nesquehoning, Pennsylvania
- Nemacolin, Pennsylvania
- Ohiopyle, Pennsylvania
- Oneida, Pennsylvania
- Passyunk Township, Pennsylvania
- Perkiomen
- Punxsutawney, Pennsylvania
- Quakake
- Queonemysing
- Shackamaxon
- Shamokin, Pennsylvania
- Shenandoah, Pennsylvania
- Shickshinny
- Tamaqua, Pennsylvania
- Tiadaghton
- Tinicum Township, Delaware County, Pennsylvania
- Tionesta
- Tobyhanna
- Towamensing
- Towanda
- Tunkhannock, Pennsylvania
- Tuscarora
- Wapwallopen, Pennsylvania
- Wissahickon, Philadelphia
- Wyalusing
- Wechquetank
- Wyomissing
- Wyoming Valley
- Wysox

State Parks and Forests

- Bald Eagle State Park
- Big Pocono State Park
- Black Moshannon State Park
- Cornplanter State Forest
- Codorus State Park
- Lackawanna State Park
- Moshannon State Forest
- Nockamixon State Park
- Ohiopyle State Park
- Pymatuning State Park
- Shawnee State Park
- Shikellamy State Park
- Sinnemahoning State Park
- Susquehannock State Park
- Tioga State Forest
- Tobyhanna State Park
- Tuscarora State Park

Mountains

- Allegheny Mountains
- Mount Nittany
- Pocono Mountains
- Wapwallopen Mountains

== See also ==
- List of place names in the United States of Native American origin#Pennsylvania—with etymologies
