= Marian Catholic High School (Pennsylvania) =

Location
- 166 Marian Avenue; Tamaqua, Schuylkill County, Pennsylvania 18252; United States; 40°49′40″N 76°0′59″W

Information
- Type: Private
- Motto: "To Jesus through Mary"
- Religious affiliation: Roman Catholic
- Established: 1954; 72 years ago
- School district: Associated with Tamaqua SD, Panther Valley SD, Hazleton SD, North Schuylkill SD, Jim Thorpe SD, Mahanoy Area SD, Lehighton Area SD, Shenandoah Valley SD
- Oversight: Roman Catholic Diocese of Allentown
- Dean: JD Hacklenberg '91
- Principal: Fr. Robert Finlan '86 CBHS
- Chaplain: Fr. Robert Finlan '86 CBHS
- Teaching staff: 21
- Grades: 9-12
- Gender: Co-educational
- Enrollment: 250
- Average class size: 15
- Campus size: 40 acres
- Campus type: Rural
- Colors: Blue and Gold
- Fight song: Notre Dame Fight Song
- Mascot: Colts and Fillies
- Team name: Colts and Fillies
- Rival: Nativity BVM High School Tamaqua Area School District
- Accreditation: Middle States Association of Colleges and Schools
- Newspaper: MARIANEWS
- Yearbook: The Marian
- Tuition: $8,112 (2025-2026)
- Website: www.mariancatholichs.org

Marian Catholic High School is a private, Roman Catholic high school in Rush Township, Pennsylvania. It is located in the Roman Catholic Diocese of Allentown. It was established in 1954 after the consolidation of St. Jerome's High School in Tamaqua, St. Mary's High School in Coaldale, and St. Ann's High School in Lansford. Its original location consisted of a three town campus located in the towns of Tamaqua, Coaldale, and Lansford. Marian Catholic's current campus was constructed on farmland in Rush Township in 1964.

== History ==
Marian Catholic High School was formed in 1954, consolidating three smaller Catholic High Schools from the small towns in the Panther Valley. It was then that Archbishop John F. O’Hara decided to combine the three existing schools into one diocesan high school. The high school was staffed by the Sisters, Servants of the Immaculate Heart of Mary.

The oldest high school was St. Mary's in Coaldale. Although ground was broken for a Catholic school at St. Mary's in Coaldale on November 18, 1914, and construction completed in March 1915, it would not be until 1924 that a high school class would graduate. On September 4, 1916, during the formal dedication, St. Mary's became the first English-speaking Catholic school in the Panther Valley.

St. Ann's High School in Lansford began in September 1917 in the church basement. Classes in the school building began in 1924 under the guidance of the Sisters, Servants of the Immaculate Heart of Mary. St. Ann's High School was established in 1922, but it was not until June 1927 that the first students to finish a full four years at the school graduated.

Ground was broken for the St. Jerome's in Tamaqua on July 23, 1919. The building was completed in 1920 and was dedicated by Dennis Cardinal Dougherty on May 30, 1921. This high school also began its classes in 1922, and the first class graduated on June 14, 1927.

When the school began in 1954, each of the existing schools acted as a separate campus. Marian freshmen students attended St. Jerome's, Tamaqua; sophomores attended St. Ann's, Lansford; and juniors and seniors attended St. Mary's, Coaldale. The current Marian Catholic High School building was dedicated on August 23, 1964, by Bishop Joseph McShea.

In 1966 Mauch Chunk Catholic High School in Jim Thorpe, Pennsylvania joined Marian Catholic High School. Mauch Chunk Catholic had begun in 1891, also under the direction of the Sisters, Servants of the Immaculate Heart of Mary.

Although the original three high schools had separate football teams in the 1920s up to the 1930s, the small enrollments eventually led to the abandonment of high school football in all three schools in 1938 until 1944, when a consolidated football team was formed from the three high schools and called the Panther Valley Catholic Golden Dragons. From 1944 until 1953, this combined football squad played Catholic (or other private) high schools exclusively.

The 2007 closings of two other local Catholic high schools expanded the area served by Marian Catholic. With the closings of Bishop Hafey High School, Hazleton, and Cardinal Brennan Jr./Sr. High School, Fountain Springs, students from the Hazleton area as well as additional areas of northern Schuylkill County began attending Marian Catholic High School.

== Notable alumni ==
Bill Bonenberger '76, President, W.B. Homes, Inc.

The Honorable Keith R. McCall '77, former Speaker of the Pennsylvania House of Representatives

Jerome Knowles '66, former Member of the Pennsylvania House of Representatives

- Sean Love, former professional football player, Buffalo Bills, Carolina Panthers, Dallas Cowboys, New York Jets, Philadelphia Eagles, and Tampa Bay Buccaneers
