= Rush Township, Schuylkill County, Pennsylvania =

Township in Pennsylvania, US

Coordinates: 40°50′00″N 75°57′59″W

- Township
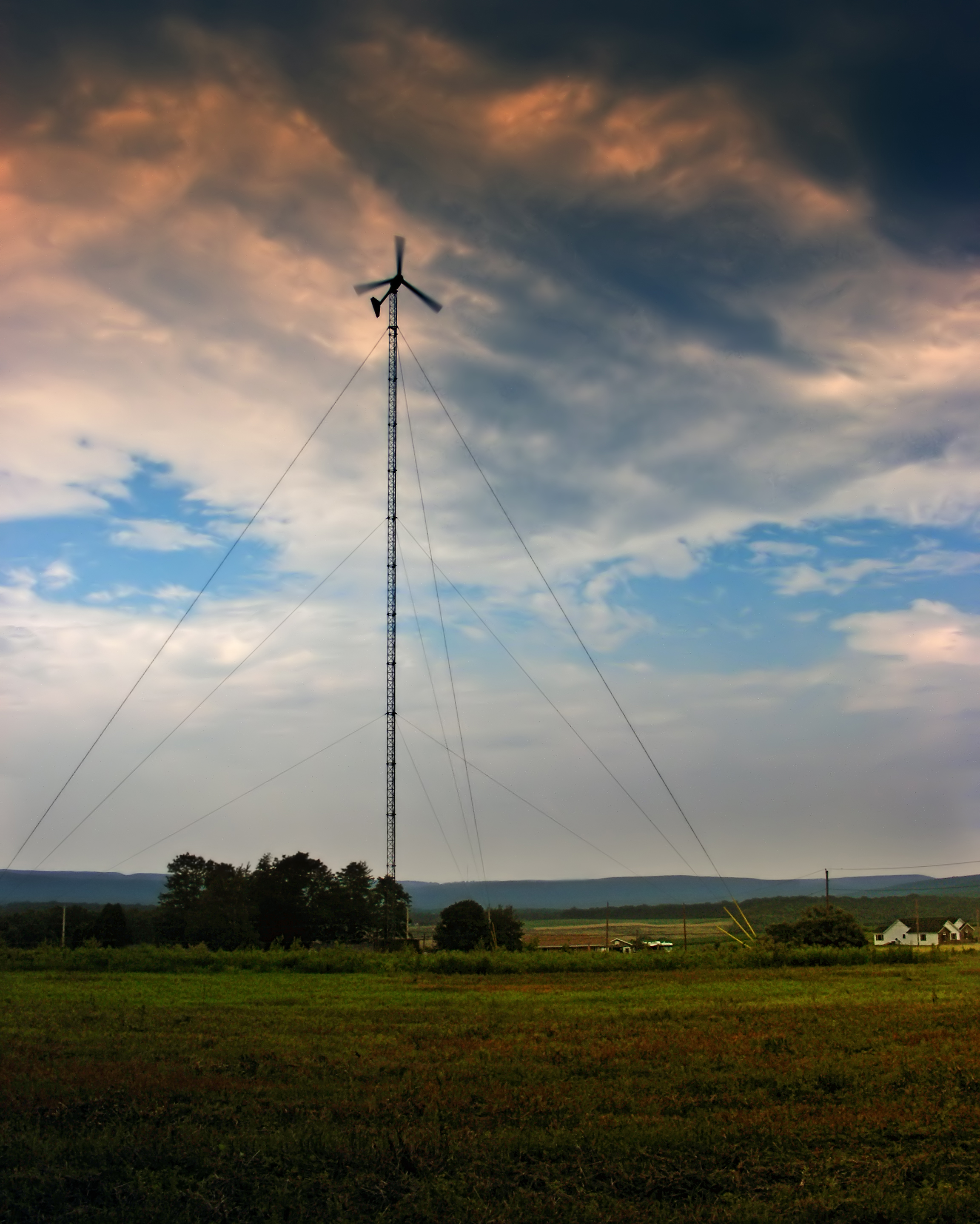
- A wind turbine on Tuscarora State Park in Rush Township in June 2010

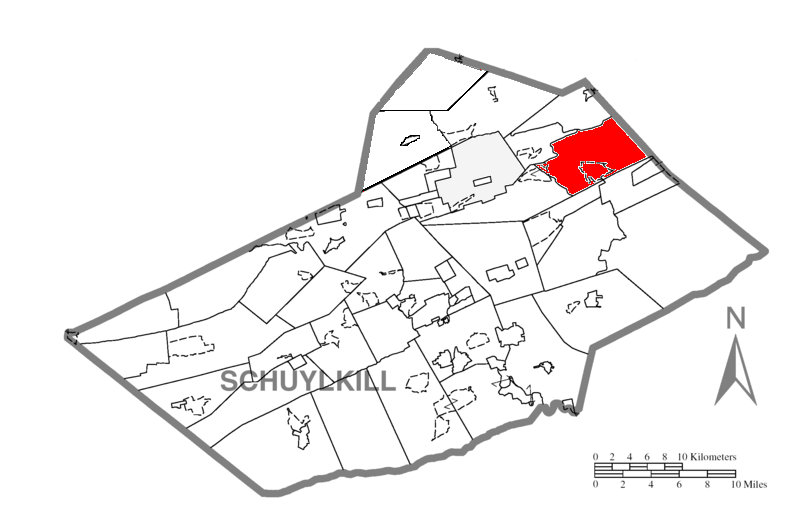
- Location of Rush Township in Schuylkill County, Pennsylvania

- Location of Schuylkill County in Pennsylvania
- Country: United States
- State: Pennsylvania
- County: Schuylkill
- Settled: 1800
- Incorporated: 1811
- Named for: Jacob Rush

Area
  - Total: 24.21 sq mi (62.70 km^{2})
  - Land: 23.18 sq mi (60.04 km^{2})
  - Water: 1.03 sq mi (2.66 km^{2})

Population (2020)
  - Total: 3,423 ▲
  - Estimate (2021): 3,440
  - Density: 143/sq mi (55.3/km^{2})
- Time zone: UTC-5 (Eastern (EST))
  - Summer (DST): UTC-4 (EDT)
- Area code: 570
- FIPS code: 42-107-66760
- School district: Tamaqua Area
- Website: rushtownship.org

Rush Township is a township in Schuylkill County, Pennsylvania, United States. The population was 3,423 at the 2020 census. The township is served by Tamaqua Area School District and Mahanoy Area School District.

== History ==
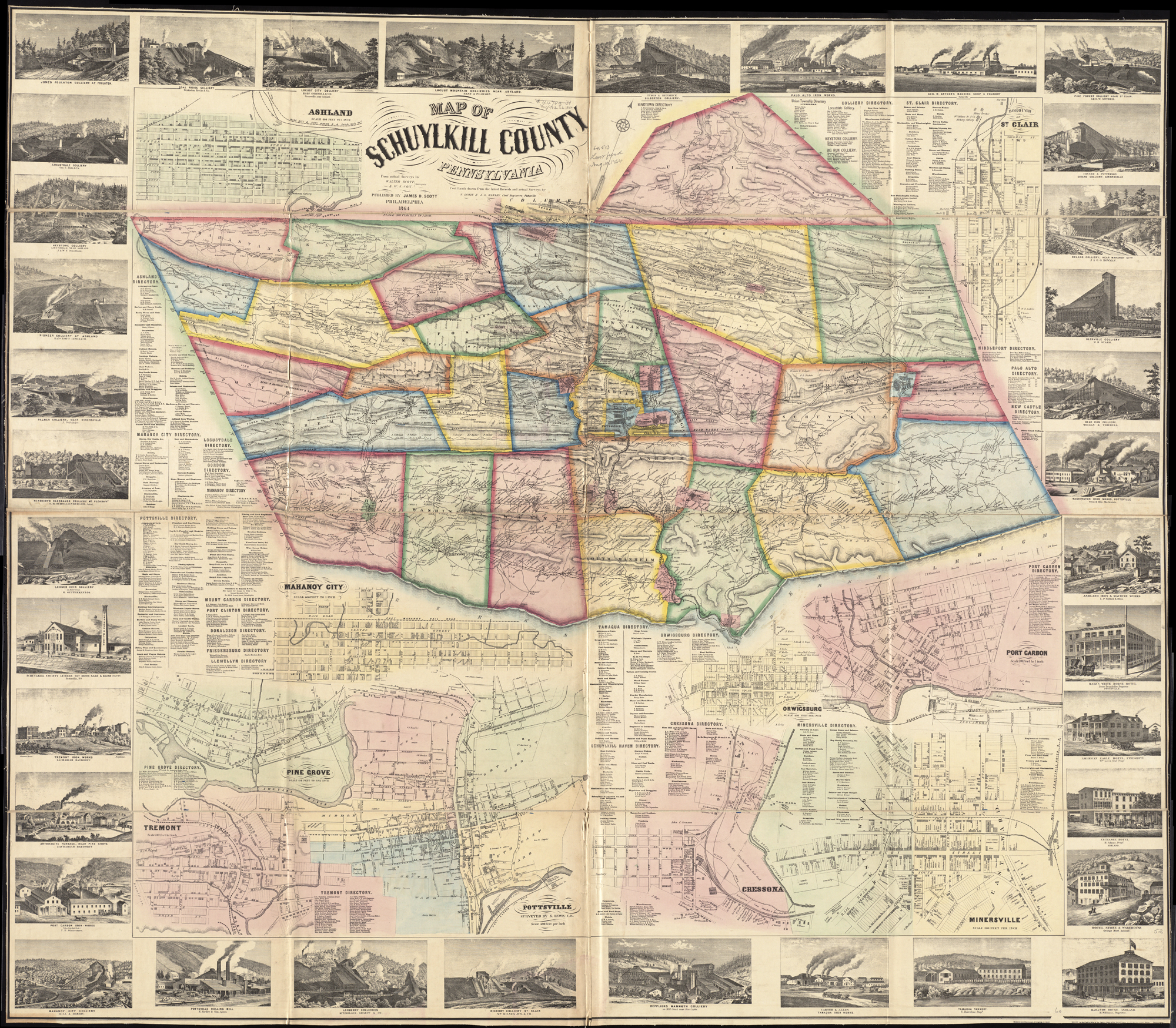
An 1864 map of Schuylkill County, Pennsylvania, showing Rush Township (in green on the top right) prior to major partitions; Mahoney Township (in yellow to the left of Rush) was part of Rush until 1849.

The township was incorporated in 1811 and is named after Judge Jacob Rush, younger brother of Benjamin Rush, a signer of the declaration of independence. Judge Rush was the judge of the third judicial district of Northampton County which included the area which would become Rush township prior to Schuylkill County's formation in 1811.

Rush township has been greatly reduced in size since 1811. Mahanoy Township split off in 1849, Ryan Township and East Union Township took sections of Rush in 1866. In 1873 Kline Township split off, and in 1882 Delano Township split off.

=== 19th century ===
The township was largely settled by German families during its foundation, with the economic basis of the township being agriculture. The company Gross & Wisimer built the township's first three mills, two sawmills and a gristmill, in 1812. However, during the Civil War the township focused almost entirely on Gunpowder production with five gunpowder mills being constructed in the township during the war. These mills resulted in a series of fatal accidents as they were prone to exploding. There were four notable and fatal explosions in 1868, 1871, 1874, and 1879.

In 1854, the Catawissa and Little Schuylkill railroads where built through the township joined soon after by the Nesquehoning Valley Railroad Company building a spur connecting Mauch Chunk to Tamanend and rail interchanges at Haucks, Pennsylvania and Quakake. The rail industry came to dominate the local industry as millions of tons of Anthracite coal would pass through the township.

=== 20th century ===
The declining use of coal to heat homes and generate electricity resulted in the closure of the Central Railroad of New Jersey in 1921. The massive decline in the rail industry greatly hurt Rush township which is still recovering.

== Geography ==
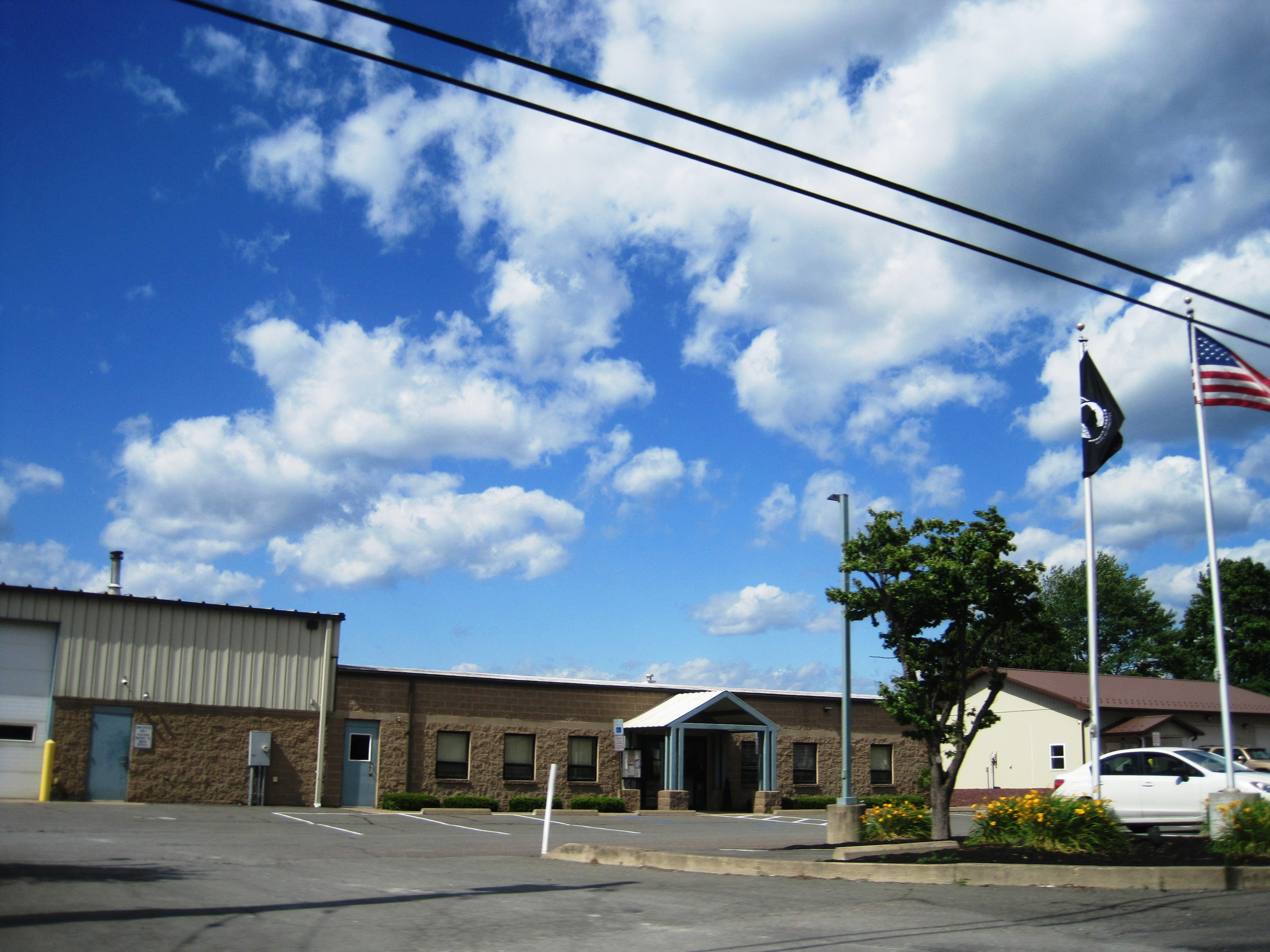
Town hall

According to the U.S. Census Bureau, the township has a total area of 23.9 square miles (61.8 km^{2}), of which 22.9 square miles (59.2 km^{2}) is land and 1.0 square mile (2.6 km^{2}) (4.27%) is water. It is in the Delaware watershed and is drained by the Schuylkill River via the Little Schuylkill River and by the Nesquehoning Creek into the Lehigh River. Its villages include Barnesville, Ginthers, Grier City (also in Delano Township), Haucks, Hometown, Park Crest (also in Ryan Township), Quakake, Still Creek, and Tamanend (also in Delano Township).

=== Neighboring municipalities ===
- Tamaqua (southeast)
- Schuylkill Township (south)
- Ryan Township (southwest)
- Delano Township (northwest)
- Kline Township (north)
- Packer Township, Carbon County (northeast)
- Nesquehoning, Carbon County (east)

=== Climate ===
Rush Township has a warm-summer humid continental climate (Dfb) and the hardiness zone is 6a. Average monthly temperatures in Hometown range from 25.2 °F in January to 69.7 °F in July. The average annual absolute minimum temperature in Hometown is -9.6 °F.

== Demographics ==
Historical population
| Census | Pop. | Note | %± |
|---|---|---|---|
| 2010 | 3,412 | | — |
| 2020 | 3,423 | | 0.3% |
| 2021 (est.) | 3,440 | | 0.5% |
U.S. Decennial Census

As of the census of 2000, there were 3,957 people, 1,419 households, and 1,058 families residing in the township. The population density was 173.2 inhabitants per square mile (66.9/km^{2}). There were 1,563 housing units at an average density of 68.4 per square mile (26.4/km^{2}). The racial makeup of the township was 96.44% White, 2.35% African American, 0.03% Native American, 0.48% Asian, 0.03% Pacific Islander, 0.25% from other races, and 0.43% from two or more races. Hispanic or Latino of any race were 1.11% of the population.

There were 1,419 households, out of which 26.2% had children under the age of 18 living with them, 65.3% were married couples living together, 6.8% had a female householder with no husband present, and 25.4% were non-families. 22.3% of all households were made up of individuals, and 13.2% had someone living alone who was 65 years of age or older. The average household size was 2.48 and the average family size was 2.90.

In the township, the population was spread out, with 18.3% under the age of 18, 9.8% from 18 to 24, 21.9% from 25 to 44, 26.3% from 45 to 64, and 23.8% who were 65 years of age or older. The median age was 45 years. For every 100 females, there were 87.7 males. For every 100 females age 18 and over, there were 83.3 males. The median income for a household in the township was $42,664, and the median income for a family was $45,750. Males had a median income of $35,386 versus $27,473 for females. The per capita income for the township was $17,893. About 4.3% of families and 6.3% of the population were below the poverty line, including 7.7% of those under age 18 and 7.7% of those age 65 or over.

== Transportation ==
STS bus route 45 serves the township along the Route 309 corridor, which runs north-to-south and intersects east-to-west Route 54 in Hometown. The bus route runs from Pottsville via Tamaqua to McAdoo. On Saturdays the Hometown auction bus 47 runs from Pottsville via Frackville, Shenandoah, and Mahanoy City to Hometown and McAdoo.
