= Little Schuylkill Navigation, Railroad and Coal Company =

Overview
- Headquarters: Philadelphia, Pennsylvania, U.S.
- Locale: Schuylkill County, Pennsylvania
- Dates of operation: 1826–1952
- Successor: Reading Railroad

Technical
- Track gauge: 4 ft 8 1/2 in (1,435 mm) standard gauge
- Length: 28 miles (45 km)

The Little Schuylkill Navigation, Railroad and Coal Company (LSRR) was a railway company in the U.S. state of Pennsylvania in the 19th century. The main line ran from Port Clinton to Tamaqua, for a total of 28 miles (45 km).

== History ==
The company was originally chartered in Pennsylvania as the Schuylkill East Branch Navigation Company on February 28, 1826. It was authorized to build a canal from the Schuylkill Navigation up the Little Schuylkill River as far as the foot of Broad Mountain. On April 14, 1828, the charter was amended to allow it to be built as a railroad instead of a canal. Another supplement on April 23, 1829 changed the name of the company to the "Little Schuylkill Navigation, Railroad and Coal Company" and allowed it to extend its tracks from the mouth of the Little Schuylkill into Reading, Pennsylvania.

Construction began in 1830. The tracks were constructed with strap iron on wood rails. Beginning with horse-drawn cars in 1831, the LSRR operated between Tamaqua, located at the end of the coal-rich Panther Creek Valley and the Port Clinton terminus of the Schuylkill Canal. It later made a rail junction with the Philadelphia and Reading Railway Company.

In 1833, the railroad acquired two steam locomotives, built in Liverpool, but the wooden tracks did not support the engines, requiring a resumption of animal-powered operations. This over-extended investment nearly bankrupted the young company. Only in 1845 did iron "T" rails replace the wooden rails, allowing the costly English locomotives to return to regular service.

In 1854, the LSRR completed a junction with the Catawissa Railroad at Tamanend (also called Little Schuylkill Junction). In 1857, it built a roundhouse in Tamaqua, housing 21 locomotives and a turntable.

In 1863, the company was leased by the Reading Railroad for 93 years. It formally merged with the Reading in 1952.

== See also ==
- List of Pennsylvania railroads
