= The Jordan Brothers =

US musical group

The Jordan Brothers were a musical group active for thirty years beginning in the mid-1950s. They originated in Frackville, Pennsylvania and achieved regional popularity in Schuylkill and surrounding counties and Philadelphia. They released 24 singles on 15 different labels, including several that were self-produced from 1957 until 1984. The brothers were:

- Joseph "Joe" Jordan (1941–January 20, 2021), keyboards and vocals, composing, arranging
- Frank Jordan (ca. 1942), saxophone and bass, vocals, composing, arranging
- Robert "Bob" Jordan (1943–October 9, 1993) drums and percussion
- Lewis "Lew" Jordan (ca. 1947–January 3, 2022) lead guitar, vocals, composing

== Origin ==
The 30-year career of the Jordan Brothers began on Halloween Eve in 1954 when instead of the usual trick-or-treating, three (Joe, Frank, and Bobby) of the eventual four brothers took to the streets with accordion, clarinet, and drum.

The group's first national appearance was on Ted Mack's The Original Amateur Hour on January 22, 1956, on ABC. The group then settled into playing local venues and dances in the middle and southern Coal Region area, with their father Angelo sitting in on bass and managing the group. In 1957, the Jordan Brothers began a five-year gig at Renninger's Market between Orwigsburg and Schuylkill Haven. This was the first in a series of long-term relationships with several venues in the Schuylkill and Berks County areas. They also recorded their first record, self-produced on the Jordan label, at Philadelphia's Reco-Art Studio: "Send Me Your Picture"/"Oh Lolly". This led to a two-year recording contract in 1958 with Jamie Records.

== Growth ==
=== Jamie Record Years ===
The arrangement with Jamie Records, introduced the Jordan Brothers into the teen publicity machine of the late fifties. One of Jamie's stockholders had been Dick Clark who had also become American Bandstand’s host in 1956. The show went national on ABC in 1957. Clark often featured Jamie artists on his show such as Duane Eddy, the Dovells and others. Appearing on American Bandstand three times, the Jordan Brothers also were part of Clark's 49-day "Caravan of Stars" that toured the United States and Canada in 1959. Traveling in one of two 40-seat buses, Frank and Joe Jordan were accompanied by the likes of the Coasters, the Drifters, the Skyliners, Bobby Rydell, LaVerne Baker, Paul Anka, Jimmy Clanton, and Duane Eddy. Frank and Joe Jordan (without Bob, not yet out of high school) were the Jordan Brothers during this tour.

The band also spent time recording in Arizona in 1959 with Donnie Owens (a fellow Pennsylvanian and a guitarist for Duane Eddy) and performing in Los Angeles in 1961 with Alan Freed’s Rock Show alongside Jimmy Clanton, Al Kooper, the Safaris, and Jackie Wilson among others.

Other than these national shows and tours, the Jordan Brothers were highly popular with Philadelphia radio disc jockeys in this period. These DJs were a key element of any record’s success and the Jordan Brothers were often featured in tours or shows with WIBG’s Good Guys, such as Joe Niagara and Hy Lit. Lit organized one of the first tours in which the Jordan Brothers participated with Dion and the Belmonts and the Coasters.

The Jordan Brothers were also featured on Jerry Blavat's WFIL Discophonic TV Scene and appeared on East Coast TV programs, especially in the tri-state area, such as Summertime on the Pier in Atlantic City with Ed Hurst.

The Jordan Brothers were with Jamie until 1961, but they never broke into the national music charts and as a result the contract with Jamie lapsed.

Jamie discography

Title	Serial #	Composer	Year released
Send Me Your Picture x	1112 J-100	Jordan Brothers	1958
Oh Lolly x	1112 J-101	Jordan Brothers	1958
Never Never	1125	Don Rollins	1959
Please Tell Me Now	1125	Jordan Brothers	1959
Be Mine	1133	Menkas-Panas-Luth	1959
Dream Romance	1133	Taylor-Cole	1959
Things I Didn't Say	1169 J-JB-7	Garson-Shuman	1960
Polly Plays Her Kettle Drum	1169 J-JB-8	Garson-Shuman	1960
No Wings on My Angel	1176 J-JB-9	David-Pockriss	1960
Living for the Day	1176 J-JB-10	Garson-Shuman	1960
Whispering Wind	1205 J-JB-11	Frank & Joe Jordan	1961
Love's Made a Fool of You	1205 J-JB-12	Buddy Holly	1961
It's You Girl+	1390 J-TJO-70-1	Lew Jordan	1970
Dream Romance+	1390 J-TJO-70-2	Taylor-Cole	1970

x Re-release of their self-produced record on the Jordan label. + Re-release by Jaime Records.

=== "The Lake" ===
The group now included brothers Bobby and Lew to round out the band. The band started building up their following in the home base of Schuylkill county and environs. After a fall-out with Renninger's, the group began a sixteen-year gig at Willow Lake in Schuylkill Haven in 1962. Willow Lake was an amusement park that housed a roller skating rink and pool. The Jordan Brothers ran dances every Friday and Saturday nights and in the summers also on Wednesday night. During the years at Renninger's the group had developed its signature theme, a song that opened and closed each dance. The composition began as the intro from "Hard Times", a Duane Eddy rocker (written and originally performed by Noble "Thin Man" Watts) from the late 1950s. Even long-time fans call this song “Hard Times”, when it is in reality the "Jordan Theme" with composer credits to the Jordan Brothers.

In 1964, the group began to conduct dances in Barnesville, Pennsylvania initially at the Lakewood Ballroom (1964) and then from 1964 to 1970 for seven years at the adjacent Lakeside Ballroom. These dances were held on Sunday nights and in the summer also on Thursdays. Since all three venues were “Lakes”, the dances were known by the same nickname and going to “The Lake” became the thing to do in the 1960s and early 1970s. These dances drew, in the aggregate, over a thousand each week in the summer at their height. The band would offer a mix of their self-composed music with cover versions of then current (including more progressive music and British Invasion sounds as the decade progressed) and “Oldies” rock and roll.

It was during this period in 1963 that the Jordan Brothers began to perform a version of “Heart” written by Barry Mann and Cynthia Weil at the “Lake”. The song was popular at these dances but was never released as a single. Because “Heart” never broke the Top 40 when it was released by Kenny Chandler of Harrisburg, PA, most people believed that the song was a Jordan Brothers original composition. Eventually, a recording was released in 1980 on the Jordan Brothers o compilation album, "Yesterday’s Todays, Volume 1".

The band was unable to find a national record label interested until 1964. However, they did release 3 singles, one under the self-produced Jordan label again, two instrumentals – "Sloe Gin" and "Basin Street Rumble" (1963) - and then two other singles with Ruby Records, an independent studio in Reading, Pennsylvania – "Revenge"/"Lover's Never Say Goodbye" (1964) and "Ya Ya"/"Gee Whiz" (1964).

In 1964, the band auditioned for V-I-M (Variety In Music) Records in New York and this label produced one single for them, "It's a Shame"/"Here I Go Again". After the British invasion, the group adjusted. The Jordan Brothers began a relationship with Cameo-Parkway Records in 1965, releasing three more singles – "What's Wrong With You Baby?"/"Jordan Theme", a re-release of this on its Cheltenham subsidiary, and "Good Love Goes Bad"/"Break Down and Cry". The Cameo relationship ended that same year.

The group self-produced another single on the Jor-Dan label in 1966, "The One That Got Away"/"Slow Thing", when they got a call from Phillips Records. Their recording of "Gimme Some Lovin'" in 1966 was their biggest hit, and charted in Boston, Baltimore and other R&B citadels. This was a song written primarily by Steve Winwood. Phillips got a copy of Winwood's demonstration copy and actually released the song in the U.S. about a month before Winwood and the Spencer Davis Group recorded it for United Artists.Frank Jordan later explained:

The people at our company played a "demo" or demonstration of the song Gimme Some Lovin' for us to hear and approve. We all agreed that we liked the song and agreed to record it. Little did we know that it was the actual 8 track tape we listened to containing Steve Winwood's vocal, organ, a lead guitar, bass guitar and drums. … We did not know this at the time or how our record company got hold of the original recording. We may never know. … We … recorded it on that same trip and it was released in three major cities in the U.S. So, we did have the first release in the U.S. and the record took off immediately. It boasted huge sales in three major cities which would make the Spencer Davis version seem like it was a cover. ...

The band nearly had a major hit, but it was not to be. The Jordan Brothers who were making a good living at the Lakes could not afford to tour (according to the financial arrangement offered by Phillips) and Phillips did little to promote them.

The Lakeside gig ended in 1970 and the Willow Lake performances began to wane until the end of "The Lake" came finally in 1977. "The Lake" years discography:

Title	Serial #	Composer	Year released	Label
Sloe Gin	J-102	Jordan Brothers	1963	Jordan
Basin Street Rumble	J-103	Jordan Brothers	1963	Jordan
Revenge	474 RB 307	Frank & Lew Jordan	1964	Ruby
Lovers Never Say Goodbye	474 RB 308	Wilson - Johnson	1964	Ruby
Ya Ya	474 RB 406	Dorsey-Robinson	1964	Ruby
Gee Whiz	474 RB 407	Jimmie Thomas - Jeanne Vikki	1964	Ruby
It's A Shame	523 V 74	Frank Jordan	1964	V-I-M
Here I Go Again	523 V 75	Frank Jordan	1964	V-I-M
What's Wrong With You Baby+	CH 1006-A	Daryll - Kornfeld	1965	Cheltenham
Jordan Theme+	CH 1006-B	Frank & Joe Jordan	1965	Cheltenham
Beach Party	1219-45-JB 1	Bowie	1964	Mer-Bri
Havin’ A Party	1219-45-JB 2	Frank Jordan	1964	Mer-Bri
Good Love Goes Bad	370 A	Frank Jordan	1965	Cameo
Break Down and Cry	370 B	Frank Jordan	1965	Cameo
The One That Got Away	7 JB - 1	Brian - Renzetti	1965	Jor-Dan
Slow Thing	7 JB - 2	Jordan Brothers	1965	Jor-Dan
Gimme Some Lovin’	40415 PHW1-39149	Winwood-Davis-Winwood	1966	Phillips
When I'm With Her	40415 PHW1-39150	Carl-Torres-Venneri	1966	Phillips

+ Also released on Parkway Records in 1965 (Serial #: 945)

== Calling It A Career ==
The Jordan Brothers were not ready to call it quits quite yet; however, during this time, the group again changed. First, it began to play Pennsylvania's southern tier – Lower Berks and Lancaster County. The Jordan Brothers were in smaller, more intimate venues in Lititz, Bernville, Ephrata and New Holland. The group still played in Schuylkill County and Reading (Berks) but again in smaller venues – “the Alley” in Pottsville for eight years (1974-1982) and “Hugos” in Reading for nine years (1976-1984), continuing the tradition of long-term local gigs that paid the bills. Second, the sound of the group became sleek and hip in keeping with the 1970s. The performances also began to include what is now referred to as classic rock. This included versions of "Smoke on the Water" and "Cold Turkey", among others.

They released six more singles (until 1984) after Gimme Some Lovin’ on small independent labels, including some re-releases of earlier work. These other recordings included "Good Time", "It’s You Girl", "Sugar Lady", a re-recording of "Gimme Some Lovin" and "We'll Make It". One of their last recordings was called prophetically, "Let’s Call It a Day".

The group broke up in 1984, but on September 17, 1986, at the Art and Ethnic Center in Pottsville at the Schuylkill County Council for the Arts, the Jordan Brothers regrouped as the Jordan Brothers Plus One Band to perform live at this one-time event. In October 1986, the Schuylkill County Commissioners proclaimed "Jordan Brothers Month".

The brothers later regrouped, recruiting 21-year-old Johnny Jordan, son of drummer Bob, as the new bass player.

The discography for the band after "Gimme Some Lovin'" was released in 1966 follows:

Title	Serial #	Composer	Year released	Label
Good Time	SSS 723 711-160	Leander-Mills	1967	Shelby Singleton Inter.
I Want to be Hers	SSS-723 711-161	Carl-Torres-Venneri	1967	Shelby Singleton Inter.
It's You Girl	GC 7000 2-A	Lew Jordan	1968	Golden Chariot
Sugar Lady	GC 7000 2-B	Day-Dischell	1968	Golden Chariot
Charlotte	TU 002 120 GM	Frank Jordan	1968	Turbo
We'll Make It	TU 002 121 GM	Frank Jordan	1968	Turbo
Gimme Some Lovin’	GC 73134-A	Winwood-Davis-Winwood	1974	Golden Chariot
Do You Know What Its Like?	GC 73134-B	Lew Jordan	1974	Golden Chariot
Thank You For The Ride	JFB-L 409A ASM 430	Frank & Lew Jordan	1980	JBP
Run Child	JFB-L 409B ASM 430	Zerato	1980	JBP
Let's Call It A Day	470-A	Lew Jordan	1984	Hurrah
Another Night, Another Song	470-B	Lew Jordan	1984	Hurrah

== Tribute ==
The Jordan Brothers have been presented with an engraved plaque at the Municipal Building in Frackville, Pennsylvania, with Jordan biographer Maxim Furek's text reading:

With a career that spanned from 1954 to 1985 the Frackville Brother's musical adventure evolved into a phenomenal forty-two recordings on fifteen different labels. They appeared with host Dick Clark on "American Bandstand" and were featured on Jerry Blavat's WFIL "Discophonic T.V. Scene". Statewide performances included "The Coal Region's" local dance halls, Willow Lake, Lakeside Ballroom, and The Alley. Some of their greatest hits included "Heart" and "Beach Party". Their biggest hit "Gimme Some Lovin" came in 1966.

In November 2015, the Jordan Brothers were honored by the opening of a Legacy Room at the Frackville Museum.

== Together again ==
In 2010, Frank and Joe Jordan reunited on stage at the Cressona Fire Company, backed by the band Diaspora. The benefit was organized for Debbie Roadcap, granddaughter of Willow Lake owners Tom and Dot Smith.

In November 2011, there was a Jordan Brothers House Party held at the Pottsville Club. Over 200 people attended, to watch Joe and Frank interact with the audience, tell stories, and perform live, three songs; “Send Me Your Picture,” “Heart,” and “Gimme Some Lovin.” During the party, each Jordan Brother (Lew, Bob, Frank and Joe) was honored with a plaque from the Schuylkill County Council of the Arts.

Joseph "Joe" Jordan died from complications of COVID-19 on January 20, 2021, at age 79. Lewis "Lew" Jordan died on January 3, 2022, at age 74. He is survived by brother Frank, the last remaining member of the Jordan Brothers.
