= Park Crest, Pennsylvania =

Unincorporated community in Pennsylvania, US

Coordinates: 40°49′07″N 76°03′20″W

- Census-designated place
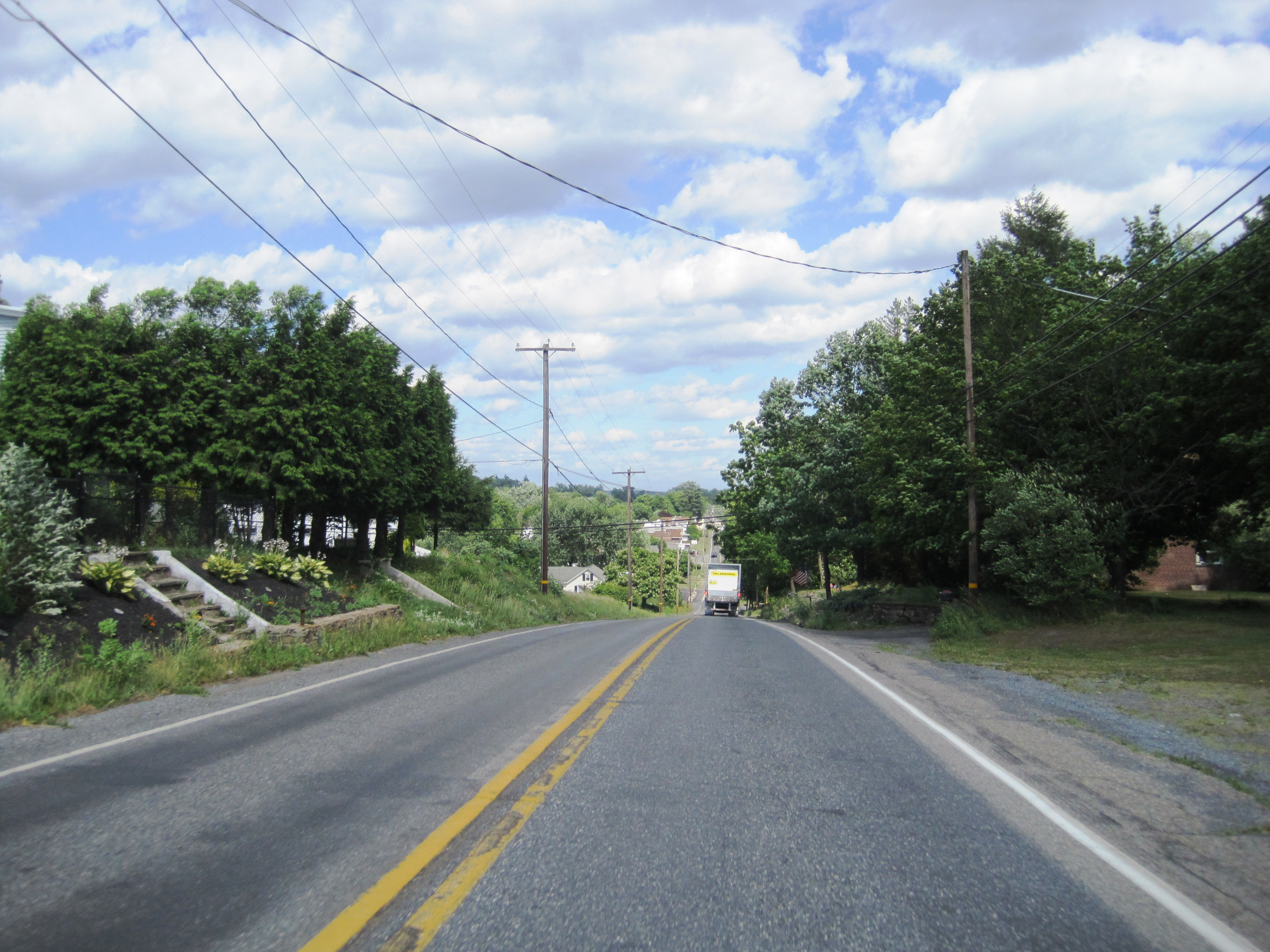
- PA 54 eastbound in Park Crest
- Interactive map of Park Crest, Pennsylvania
- Country: United States
- State: Pennsylvania
- County: Schuylkill

Area
  - Total: 0.78 sq mi (2.03 km^{2})
  - Land: 0.78 sq mi (2.03 km^{2})
  - Water: 0 sq mi (0.00 km^{2})

Population (2020)
  - Total: 591
  - Density: 753.8/sq mi (291.06/km^{2})
- Time zone: UTC-5 (Eastern (EST))
  - Summer (DST): UTC-4 (EDT)
- ZIP code: 18214
- Area codes: 272 and 570
- FIPS code: 42-57968

Park Crest is a census-designated place located in Rush Township in Schuylkill County in the state of Pennsylvania, United States. Park Crest was part of the Grier City-Park Crest CDP for the 2000 census, before splitting into two separate CDPs for the 2010 census, the other being Grier City. The community is located off Interstate 81. As of the 2010 census, the population was 542 residents.

== Demographics ==
Historical population
Census	Pop.	Note	%±
2020	591		—
U.S. Decennial Census
