= Nativity BVM High School =

Private, coeducational school in Pottsville, Pennsylvania, United States

Nativity of the Blessed Virgin Mary High School

Location
- 1 Lawtons Hill, Pottsville, Pennsylvania 17901; 40.691218 -76.192090; Pottsville, (Schuylkill County), Pennsylvania 17901; United States

Information
- Type: Private, Coeducational
- Motto: Sequere Mariam (Follow Mary)
- Religious affiliation: Roman Catholic
- Patron saint: The Blessed Virgin Mary
- Established: 1955
- Founder: Reverend John J. Nugent
- Oversight: Diocese of Allentown
- Principal: Mr. Michael Grabowski
- Chaplain: Fr. Kevin Bobbin
- Staff: 7
- Faculty: 20
- Grades: 9-12
  - Grade 9: 45
  - Grade 10: 38
  - Grade 11: 55
  - Grade 12: 62
- Student to teacher ratio: 11:1
- Colors: Green and Gold
- Song: Hail, Nativity
- Fight song: Take Me Home, Country Roads
- Athletics: PIAA Athletic Assoc.
- Mascot: The Hilltopper
- Team name: Green Wave, Hilltoppers, Golden Girls
- Rival: Marian Catholic High School (Pennsylvania), Pottsville Area High School
- Accreditation: Middle States Association of Colleges and Schools
- Newspaper: Skylines
- Yearbook: Lawtonian
- Feeder schools: Assumption BVM School, St. Nicholas Ukrainian Catholic School
- Athletic Director: Mrs. Ruth Weidman
- Website: www.nativitybvm.net

Nativity B. V. M. High School is a private, Roman Catholic high school in Pottsville, Pennsylvania. It is located in the Roman Catholic Diocese of Allentown.

== History ==
=== 20th century ===
Nativity B.V.M. (Blessed Virgin Mary) High School is a Catholic four-year co-educational secondary school. It was founded in 1955 as the successor to Pottsville Catholic High School (home of the now feeder school of Assumption BVM), formerly Saint Patrick's High School and Saint Stephen's High School in Port Carbon. In 1927, Father Edward L. Gatens, pastor of Saint Patrick Church, in Pottsville, planned the building of Pottsville Catholic High School. On October 15, Cardinal Dougherty of the Roman Catholic Archdiocese of Philadelphia dedicated the new building at 112 S. 7th Street, now Assumption BVM School, which still bears the engraving "P.C.H. School" above the door. From 1928 to 1955, Pottsville Catholic was a diocesan Catholic high school with the Sisters of Saint Joseph as faculty. Saint Patrick's Grade School, housed in the same building, was a parish school.

At that time, Catholic schools in this area still belonged to the Roman Catholic Archdiocese of Philadelphia. The constantly increasing enrollment made a new building imperative, and Monsignor John Boyle, then pastor of St. Patrick's, Pottsville, was commissioned by Archbishop John Joseph O'Hara of Philadelphia to purchase ground for the new diocesan high school.

The Ku Klux Klan used to be very active in Schuylkill County. Before Nativity BVM High School was built, burning crosses could be seen on top of Lawtons Hill from the area in and around Pottsville. When Lawton's Hill was selected as the site for the new Catholic high school, the cross was a prominent theme in the building's design. Windows of amber glass, facing westward, form one large cross that looks out from all three floors of the building.

Catholic high school students beginning their freshman, sophomore, junior, and senior years attended Nativity starting in September 1955. The school was dedicated to the Blessed Virgin Mary on April 14, 1956, with Reverend John J. Nugent serving as the founding principal. The Feast of the Nativity, or birthday, of the Blessed Virgin Mary is celebrated on September 8. The class of 1959 was the first class to go through an entire four years at Nativity.

Diocesan priests and Carmelite Fathers taught at Nativity; communities of Sisters on the faculty were Sisters of St. Joseph, Missionaries of the Sacred Heart, Sisters of St. Casimir, and Sisters of the Immaculate Heart of Mary. The first graduating class of 148 seniors received their diplomas in June 1956. The first yearbook of Nativity BVM High School was called Ave Maria (Hail Mary) and was published in 1956.

Father Nugent was the principal of Nativity from 1955 to 1967. During his tenure, the Allentown Diocese was formed from an area that had formerly been part of the Philadelphia Archdiocese. In 1960, Catholic schools in Schuylkill, Berks, Carbon, Lehigh, and Northampton Counties became part of the new Allentown Diocese. In 1961, a senior named John Vincent Egan graduated and enrolled at Saint Charles Seminary. He later became Nativity's principal, and worked with faculty members who had been his teacher.

Soon the Holy Family Sisters joined other religious communities on the school faculty. Enrollment continued to increase; some classes had approximately 300 students, and the enrollment of the entire school rose to about 1300. The school did not charge tuition at that time, although students had to buy their own books and pay an activities fee. Seeing the need for an ongoing fundraiser, Father Nugent sought the help of local businessmen, who began plans for an annual dinner which they named the "Century Club" (after the nickname for a $100 bill) because the admission fee was $100. The first Century Club dinner was held in 1968, during the administration of Rev. Joseph T. Gilmore, who was principal of Nativity from 1967 to 1969.

Rev. John A. Rusek was principal during the 1969–1970 school year. The name of Nativity's yearbook was changed, and the 1970 school yearbook was known as The Lawtonian. "Skylines" was the name given to the school newspaper. Rev. Joseph D. Hulko was principal from 1970 to 1977. Rev. Leo F. Lenick was principal during the school year of 1977–1978. Rev. John V. Egan served as principal from 1978 to 1982 but died several years after he left Nativity.

By the early 1970s, Catholic schools had begun to charge tuition, and decreasing enrollment was a trend in most areas. In 1978, 178 seniors graduated from Nativity, and the school enrollment was still larger than it was in 1956.

Rev. Stephen L. Maco became principal in 1982 and served until 1991. Rev. Anthony P. Mongiello was principal from 1991 to 1992. In 1991, the new Development Office of Nativity published the first Alumni Directory and the first Alumni Newsletter, Nativity Now. Nativity's Recruitment Committee was also formed during Father Mongiello's tenure. 97% of the graduating class of 1992 went on to further their education. Members of that class were awarded a total of over $700,000 in scholarships, grants, and awards.

Rev. Ronald C. Bocian was principal from 1992 to 1999. During Msgr. Bocian's tenure, there was a marked increase in Nativity's enrollment, especially in the freshman class, which increased by 68%. As before, the vast majority of graduates went on to college, many with awards, grants, and scholarships. There was also a dramatic increase in the number and variety of new courses and teachers.

=== 21st century ===
Rev. Ronald V. Jankaitis became principal at the beginning of the 1999–2000 academic year and remained until July 14, 2008. Fr. Jankaitis was a teacher and principal at Nativity for 21 years.

Rev. Christopher L. Wakefield joined the Nativity community as president on July 15, 2008. Fr. Wakefield was joined on the Nativity Leadership Team by Principal Bruce Hess. At that time, Nativity would have a President/Principal model at the school. This model reverted to a Principal/Chaplain model beginning in 2010, when Mrs. Lynn Sabol, long-time teacher and studies director, was named principal of the school. She retired as principal at the end of the 2024–2025 school year and still works in the math department part-time. Her successor is Michael Grabowski, who served as dean of students from 2021 to 2025.

== School Information ==
Nativity's student-teacher ratio is 10 to 1. The faculty is made up of lay teachers. While Nativity is a Catholic secondary school, it accepts students of other religions. It also accepts students of all races, cultures, creeds, and economic backgrounds.

== Sports ==
Nativity is also home to the Golden Girls, who have won five state basketball titles. In 1978, the team finished its 34–1 season with a 46–41 victory over the Johnsonburg Area High School Rams on March 18 at the Hershey Park Arena to win the PIAA Class A girls' state basketball championship. The team was coached that year by Madge Snyder, who coached the girls' volleyball and softball teams from the mid-1970s through the early 1980s, and the Rev. Stephen Mako.
