= Tuscarora State Park =

State park in Schuylkill County, Pennsylvania

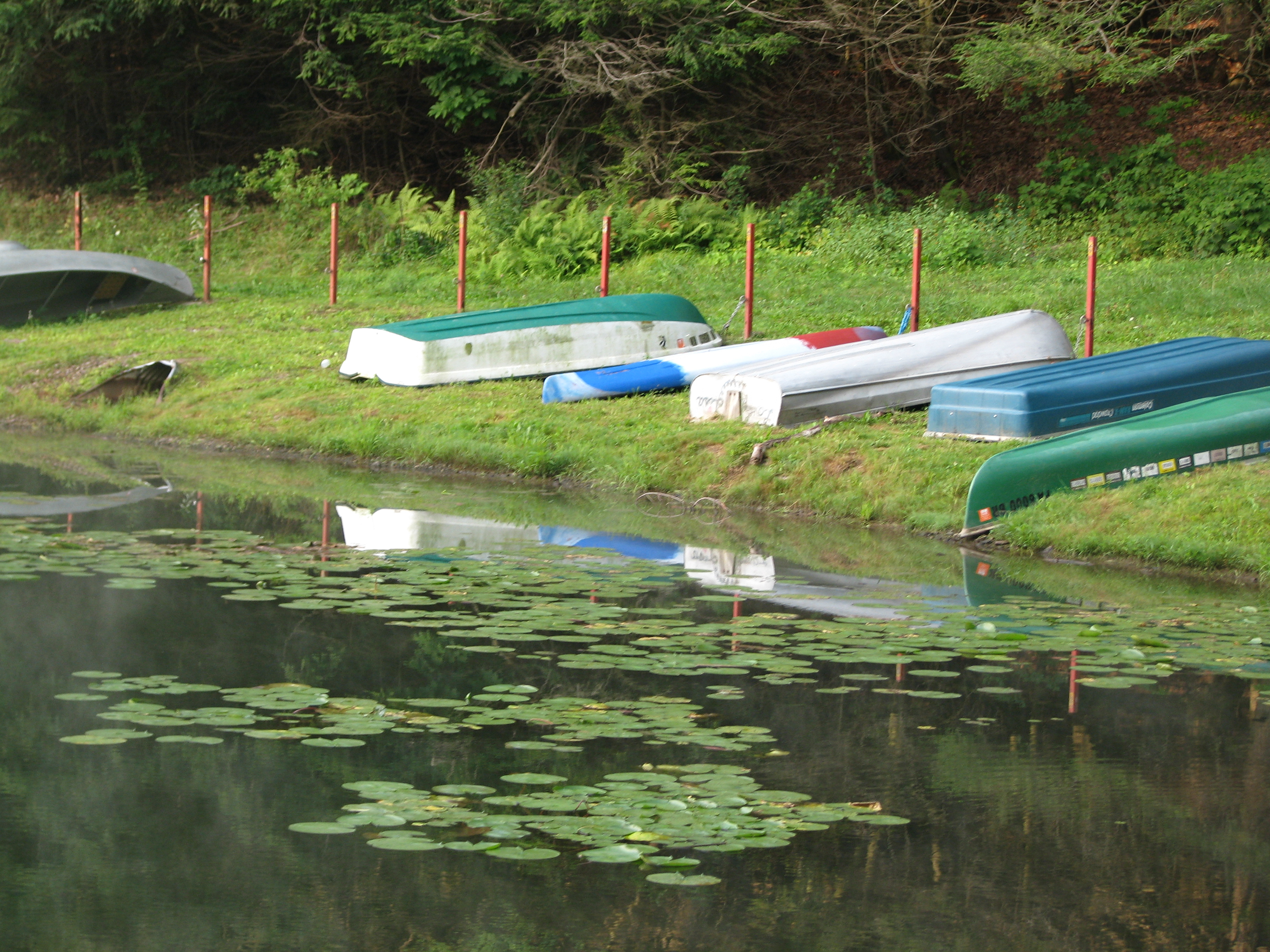

- Location within Pennsylvania Location within the United States
- Interactive map of Tuscarora State Park
- Location: Schuylkill County, Pennsylvania, United States
- Coordinates: 40°48′33″N 76°01′14″W
- Area: 1,618 acres (655 ha)
- Elevation: 1,079 feet (329 m)
- Established: 1971
- Administrator: Pennsylvania Department of Conservation and Natural Resources
- Website: Official website
- Pennsylvania State Parks

Tuscarora State Park is a Pennsylvania state park on 1,618 acres (655 ha) in Rush, Ryan, Schuylkill Townships, Schuylkill County, Pennsylvania in the United States. The most prominent features of the park are Locust Mountain and Tuscarora Lake. The park is named for the Tuscarora Indians, who lived in the area, following the Tuscarora War in North Carolina, until they were forced out by the colonial settlers of Pennsylvania. Tuscarora State Park is 2 miles (3.2 km) west of Tamaqua just off of Pennsylvania Route 54.

== History ==
Tuscarora State Park is located in Locust Valley. This land was covered by an old-growth forest of eastern white pine, American chestnut, eastern hemlock, ash, hickory, elm, oak and cherry trees. The land was controlled at various times by the Susquehannock, Lenape and at the time of the arrival of colonial settlers, the Iroquois League of Five Nations.

Anthracite coal was discovered in Schuylkill County. The forests of the Locust Valley were harvested to provide lumber for supports in the coal mines and the various buildings and homes erected by the coal mining companies. Hemlock was used to produce leather goods in the tanneries that were built in the area. The massive destruction of the forests left the Locust Valley an area of shrubby land that was susceptible to flooding, erosion and wild fires. Some of the land was cleared and farmed.

The area in and around Tuscarora and Locust Lake State Parks was purchased by the Marchalonis family. They constructed Locust Lake and allowed the forests and the area to grow back. They sold their land to the state of Pennsylvania in 1966 and the parks were opened soon afterwards.

== Recreation ==
=== Trails ===
The park has seven hiking trails that wander through deciduous forests, meadows and fields. The trails are all reclaimed logging roads, making them quite wide, and are not marked with identifying blazes.

- Log Trail is an "easy" 0.3-mile (480 m) long hiking trail. This former logging road connects Laurel and Edge trails as it makes its way through a second growth forest.
- Locust Mountain Trail is a "moderate" 0.4-mile (640 m) hiking trail. This trail ascends Locust Mountain from Crow Trail and passes through a second growth forest.
- Laurel Trail is an "easy" 0.4-mile (640 m) grassy road that was built to gain access to the trees that died from severe gypsy moth caterpillar damage during the 1980s.
- Lake View Trail is an "easy" 1-mile (1.6 km) trail that parallels Tuscarora Lake. This trail is sometimes used as a service road by park employees and park concessionaires.
- Hill Trail is a "moderate" 0.3-mile (480 m) short, but steep trail that parallels a power line and provides easy and direct access to the picnic area and beach from the park office.
- Edge Trail is an "easy" 0.3-mile (480 m) grassy trail. It forms a boundary between the forest and farmer's fields.
- Crow Trail is an "easy" 1.4-mile (2.3 km) old dirt road. It passes through second growth forests, pine and larch plantations, grassy fields and an overgrown meadow.

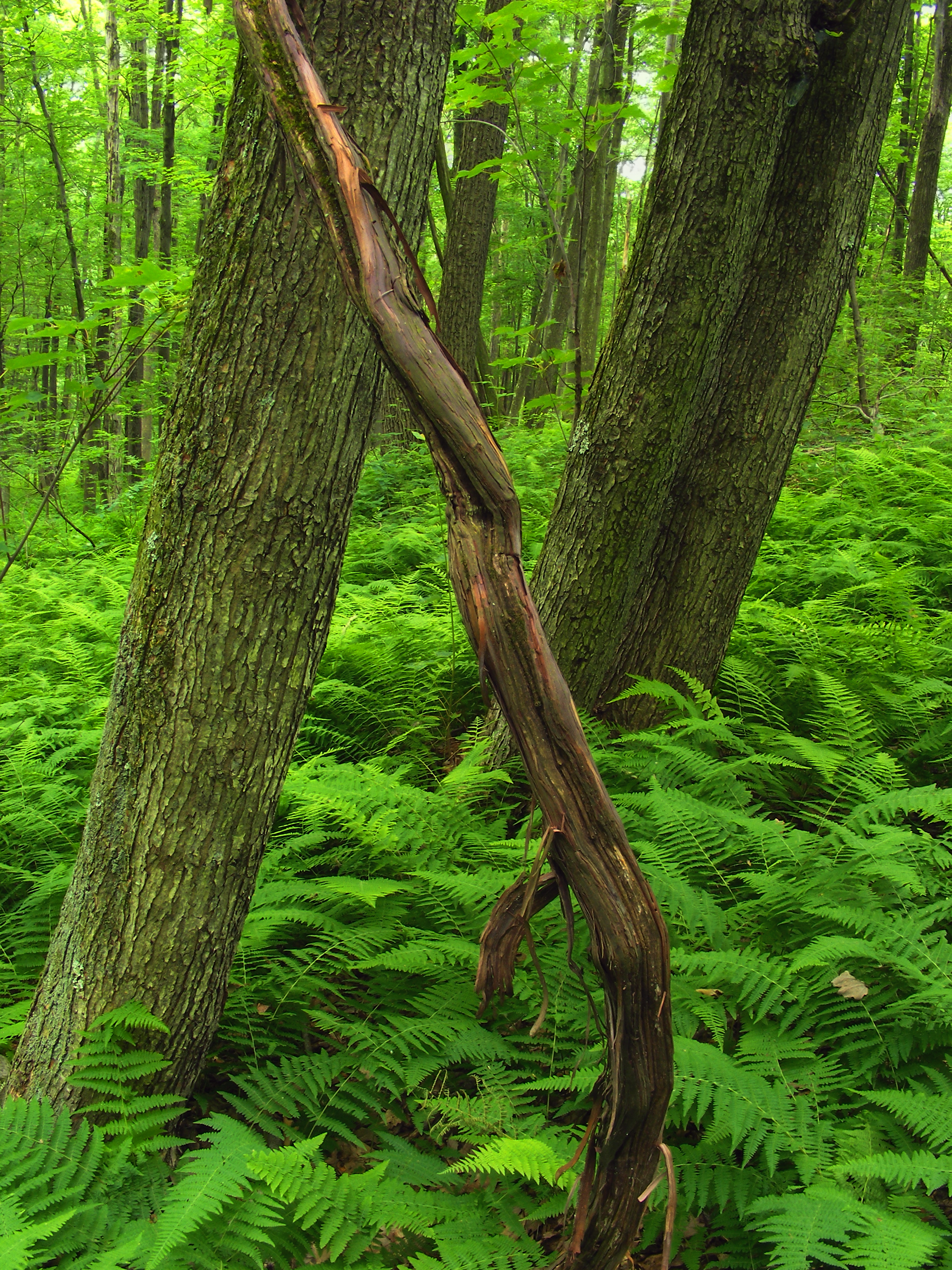
Ferns and trees in the park

=== Tuscarora Lake ===
Tuscarora Lake is a warm water fishery containing bass, muskellunge, walleye, pickerel, catfish, yellow perch, trout and sunfish. Night fishing and ice fishing are permitted. The rules and regulations of the Pennsylvania Fish and Boat Commission apply. All boats must be either row boats or powerboats with electric motors. They must have a launch permit from the fish commission or valid registration from any state. Rowboats, canoes and pedal boats are available to rent.

The lake is open for swimming beginning on Memorial Day weekend and ending Labor Day weekend. Beginning in 2008 lifeguards will not be posted at the beach. The maximum depth of the lake in the swimming area is 5.5 feet (1.67 m).

=== Hunting ===
Hunting is permitted on about 1,100 acres (445 ha) of Tuscarora State Park. The hunting of groundhogs is prohibited. Hunters are expected to follow the rules and regulations of the Pennsylvania Game Commission. The primary game species are squirrels, white-tailed deer, rabbits, pheasant, woodcocks, doves, turkey, and ruffed grouse.

=== Overnight area ===
Tuscarora has an overnight area with camping cottages and yurts.
