= Grier City-Park Crest, Pennsylvania =

Grier City-Park Crest
- Former CDP
- Location within the U.S. state of Pennsylvania
- Coordinates: 40°49′9″N 76°3′29″W
- Country: United States
- State: Pennsylvania
- County: Schuylkill

Population (2000)
  - Total: 954
- Time zone: UTC-5 (Eastern (EST))
  - Summer (DST): UTC-4 (EDT)
- ZIP code: 18214
- Area code: 570

Grier City-Park Crest was a census-designated place (CDP) in Schuylkill County, Pennsylvania, United States. The population was 954 at the 2000 census. For the 2010 census the area was split into two CDPs, Grier City and Park Crest.

== Geography ==
According to the United States Census Bureau, the CDP had a total area of 1.7 square miles (4.4 km^{2}), of which 1.7 square miles (4.4 km^{2}) was land and 0.04 square miles (0.10 km^{2}), or 1.16%, was water.

== Demographics ==
As of the census of 2000, there were 954 people, 381 households, and 283 families residing in the CDP. The population density was 555.9 inhabitants per square mile (214.6/km^{2}). There were 413 housing units at an average density of 240.6 per square mile (92.9/km^{2}). The racial makeup of the CDP was 99.79% White and 0.21% from two or more races. Hispanic or Latino of any race were 0.31% of the population.

There were 381 households, out of which 27.3% had children under the age of 18 living with them, 59.6% were married couples living together, 10.5% had a female householder with no husband present, and 25.7% were non-families. 21.5% of all households were made up of individuals, and 11.0% had someone living alone who was 65 years of age or older. The average household size was 2.50 and the average family size was 2.93.

In the CDP, the population was spread out, with 20.8% under the age of 18, 6.2% from 18 to 24, 25.4% from 25 to 44, 31.1% from 45 to 64, and 16.6% who were 65 years of age or older. The median age was 44 years. For every 100 females, there were 91.2 males. For every 100 females age 18 and over, there were 92.9 males.

The median income for a household in the CDP was $42,574, and the median income for a family was $47,045. Males had a median income of $35,435 versus $21,944 for females. The per capita income for the CDP was $17,443. About 9.9% of families and 9.7% of the population were below the poverty line, including 15.4% of those under age 18 and 15.7% of those age 65 or over.
