= Sean Love =

American football player (born 1968)

No. 79
- Position: Guard

Personal information
- Born: September 6, 1968 (age 58); Coaldale, Pennsylvania, U.S.
- Listed height: 6 ft 3 in (1.91 m)
- Listed weight: 304 lb (138 kg)

Career information
- High school: Marian Catholic (Tamaqua, Pennsylvania)
- College: Penn State
- NFL draft: 1991: 10th round, 264th overall pick

Career history
- Dallas Cowboys (1991)*; New York Giants (1991)*; Buffalo Bills (1992–1993)*; Tampa Bay Buccaneers (1993–1994); Carolina Panthers (1995); Tampa Bay Buccaneers (1997)*; New York Jets (1997)*; Philadelphia Eagles (1997); Orlando Rage (2001)
- * Offseason or practice squad member only

Career NFL statistics
- Games played: 19
- Games started: 1
- Stats at Pro Football Reference

Sean Fitzgerald Love (born September 6, 1968) is an American former professional football player who was an offensive guard in the National Football League (NFL) for the Tampa Bay Buccaneers and Carolina Panthers. He played college football for the Penn State Nittany Lions.

== Early life ==
Love attended Marian Catholic High School in Tamaqua, Pennsylvania, where he played as a both an offensive and defensive tackle, contributing to a three-year mark of 32–4.

As a junior in 1986, he posted 27 sacks, helping the team post a 13–0 record, that was part of a 24–game winning streak and a district title. As a senior, he contributed to a conference championship, while receiving All-State honors. He was named the defensive most valuable player in the Big 33 Football Classic between the all-stars from the states of Pennsylvania and Maryland.

== College career ==
Love accepted a football scholarship from Penn State University and was redshirted as a freshman. As a freshman in 1989, he played as an offensive guard, starting 9 out of 11 games.

As a sophomore, he was named a starter at guard, but suffered a leg injury in the season opener against the University of Virginia, that forced him to miss 3 of the next 8 games. He returned to start in the last 2 games of the year.

As a junior, he suffered different injuries that limited him to play in only 4 games and 57 offensive plays. He was limited to 19 games in three seasons due to injuries, so he declared for the 1991 NFL draft.

== Professional career ==
=== Dallas Cowboys ===
Love was selected in the tenth round (264th overall) of the 1991 NFL draft by the Dallas Cowboys. He was waived on August 12.

=== New York Giants ===
On August 14, 1991, he was claimed off waivers by the New York Giants. He was cut on August 26.

=== Buffalo Bills ===
On July 6, 1992, he was signed by the Buffalo Bills. He was released on October 21 from the practice squad. He was re-signed in 1993, but was released before the season started.

=== Tampa Bay Buccaneers (first stint) ===
On August 31, 1993, the Tampa Bay Buccaneers claimed him off waivers. He was declared inactive during the first 5 games, before being waived and signed to the practice squad. He was promoted to the active roster for the team's final 7 games, seeing action on special teams in 2 contests.

In 1994, he played in six games, before missing final part of the season with shoulder injury. He was waived on August 22, 1995.

=== Carolina Panthers ===
On September 6, 1995, Love signed with the expansion Carolina Panthers for their inaugural season. That year, he played in a career high 11 games mainly on special teams and made the only start of his professional career. He was released on August 18, 1996.

=== Tampa Bay Buccaneers (second stint) ===
On January 2, 1997, he signed a two-year contract with the Tampa Bay Buccaneers. He was cut on August 18.

=== New York Jets ===
Love was claimed off waivers by the New York Jets, before being traded to the Philadelphia Eagles a few days later in exchange for past considerations.

=== Philadelphia Eagles ===
Although he was cut by the Philadelphia Eagles prior to the start of the 1997 season, he was later brought back in November and was activated in two out of the final six games. He was re-signed in 1998, but was released in August.

=== Orlando Rage ===
On December 6, 2000, he was claimed from the P.A.S.S. pool by the Orlando Rage of the XFL. In 2001, he played in 10 games with 5 starts. The league was terminated on May 10, 2001.
