= Locust Lake State Park =

State park in Pennsylvania, United States

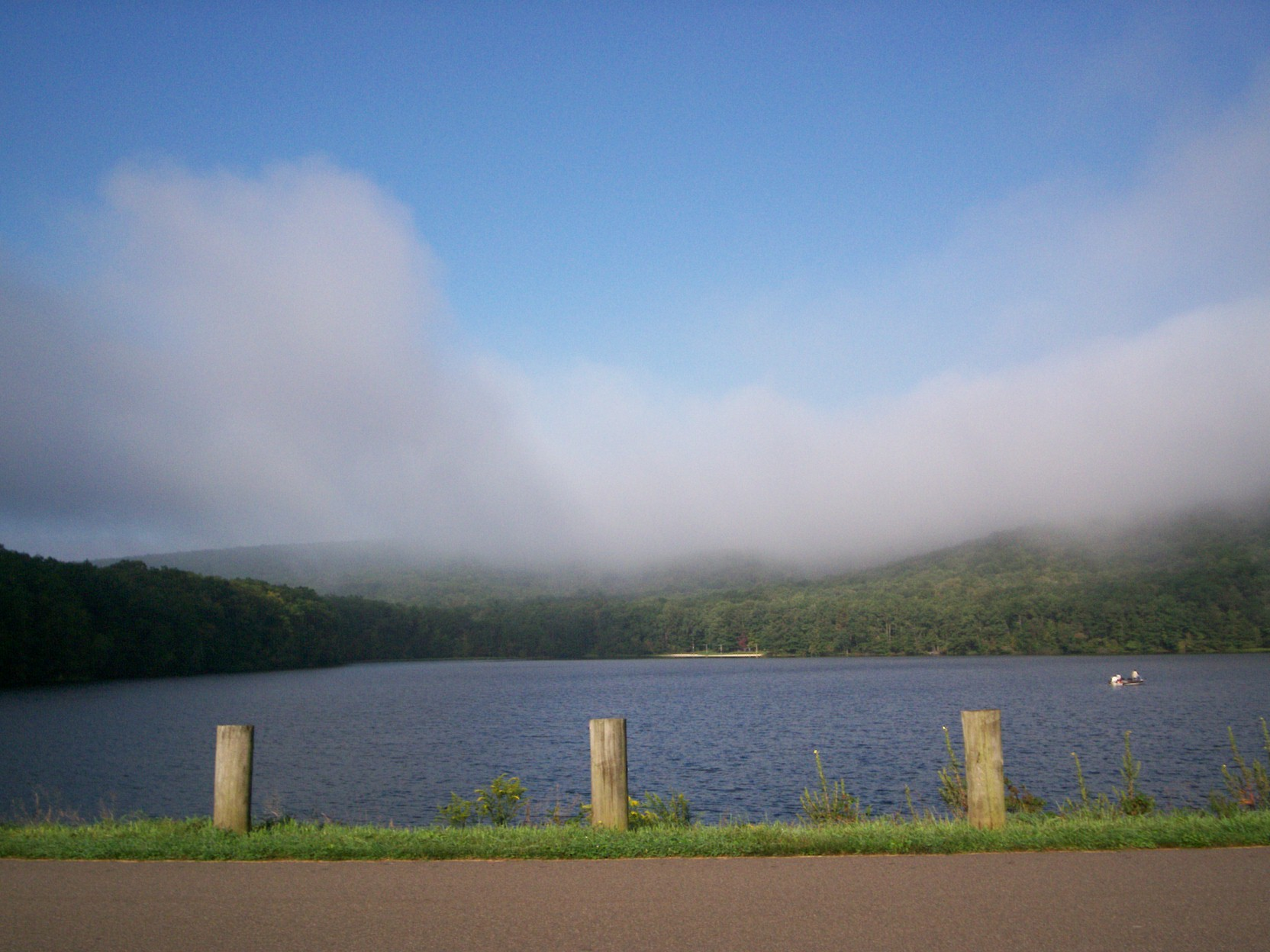

- Location within Pennsylvania Location within the United States
- Interactive map of Locust Lake State Park
- Location: Schuylkill County, Pennsylvania, United States
- Coordinates: 40°47′06″N 76°07′09″W
- Area: 1,772 acres (717 ha)
- Elevation: 1,749 feet (533 m)
- Established: 1972
- Administrator: Pennsylvania Department of Conservation and Natural Resources
- Website: Official website
- Pennsylvania State Parks

Locust Lake State Park is a Pennsylvania state park on 1,089 acres (441 ha) in Ryan Township, Schuylkill County, Pennsylvania in the United States. Locust Lake State Park is located approximately 7 miles (11 km) north of Pottsville, 3 miles (5 km) south of Mahanoy City, 8 miles (13 km) west of Tamaqua and 6 miles (10 km) west of Tuscarora State Park. The lake is 52 acres (21 ha). The park offers hiking, camping, boating, fishing, swimming, biking, and a wide array of other seasonal activities.

== History ==
The Locust Valley area was originally claimed by the Lenape. Their land was conquered by the Susquehannocks, then later controlled by the Iroquois League of Five Nations. In the mid-19th century, settlers discovered anthracite coal in the area which led to thousands of immigrants swiftly arriving to the area to mine coal. Although the area was not suitable for coal mining, it did not escape the Industrial Revolution. The forest was quickly turned into a shrubbery area prone to flooding and fires after loggers turned the trees into lumber, shingles, tool handles, and other wood products. Tanneries used the white pine and hemlock bark for tanning leather. The forests were gone by the early 20th century, with some farmers clearing and tilling the land. After its purchase by the Marchalonis Brothers, Locust Lake became a fishing spot and picnicking area. While they were digging a lake, they found a dam with a water wheel under seven feet of debris and leaves. The Commonwealth of Pennsylvania purchased the land from the Marchalonis Brothers in 1966. Locust Lake officially opened on June 10, 1972. Oldest brother, Bill, went on to create "Blue Mt. Lakes", in Schyukill Haven, Pa.

== Recreation ==
=== Locust Lake ===
Motor boats are allowed as long as you have a boat registration from any state. Non-powered boats may either have a boat registration from any state, or a launching or mooring permit from Pennsylvania State Parks. Boat rentals are available at a nominal fee.

Locust Lake has 282 campsites divided into tent or trailer sites. The campsites encircle the lake.

Fishing is permitted year round. The lake is stocked several times a year with brown and brook trout. Pickerel, bass (smallmouth and largemouth), and panfish are also caught year round. Ice fishing is permitted, but the ice is not monitored for safety.

Swimming is permitted from Memorial Day to Labor Day. Since 2008, lifeguards are not posted at the beach. Swimming areas are marked with buoys, and the deepest area is 5 feet 6 inches (1.68 m).

=== Hunting ===
Approximately 1,045 acres (423 ha) are available for hunting. Ruffed Grouse, woodcock, doves, Common pheasants, Eastern gray squirrels, wild turkeys, eastern cottontail rabbit, and white-tailed deer are common species and frequently spotted. Although there is ample room for hunting, it is restricted to designated areas of the park and surrounding state forest. A bow and arrow and flintlock muzzle loader only hunting area is located in the park. Hunting groundhogs is prohibited. Dog training is permitted from the day after Labor day until March 31 in designated hunting areas.
