= Chillisquaque =

Chillisquaque may refer to:

- A variant of Chalahgawtha (Chillicothe), a Shawnee tribal division
- Chillisquaque Creek, Pennsylvania
- East Chillisquaque Township, Northumberland County, Pennsylvania
- West Chillisquaque Township, Pennsylvania
