= Grier City, Pennsylvania =

Unincorporated community in Pennsylvania, US

Coordinates: 40°49′43″N 76°03′20″W

- Census-designated place
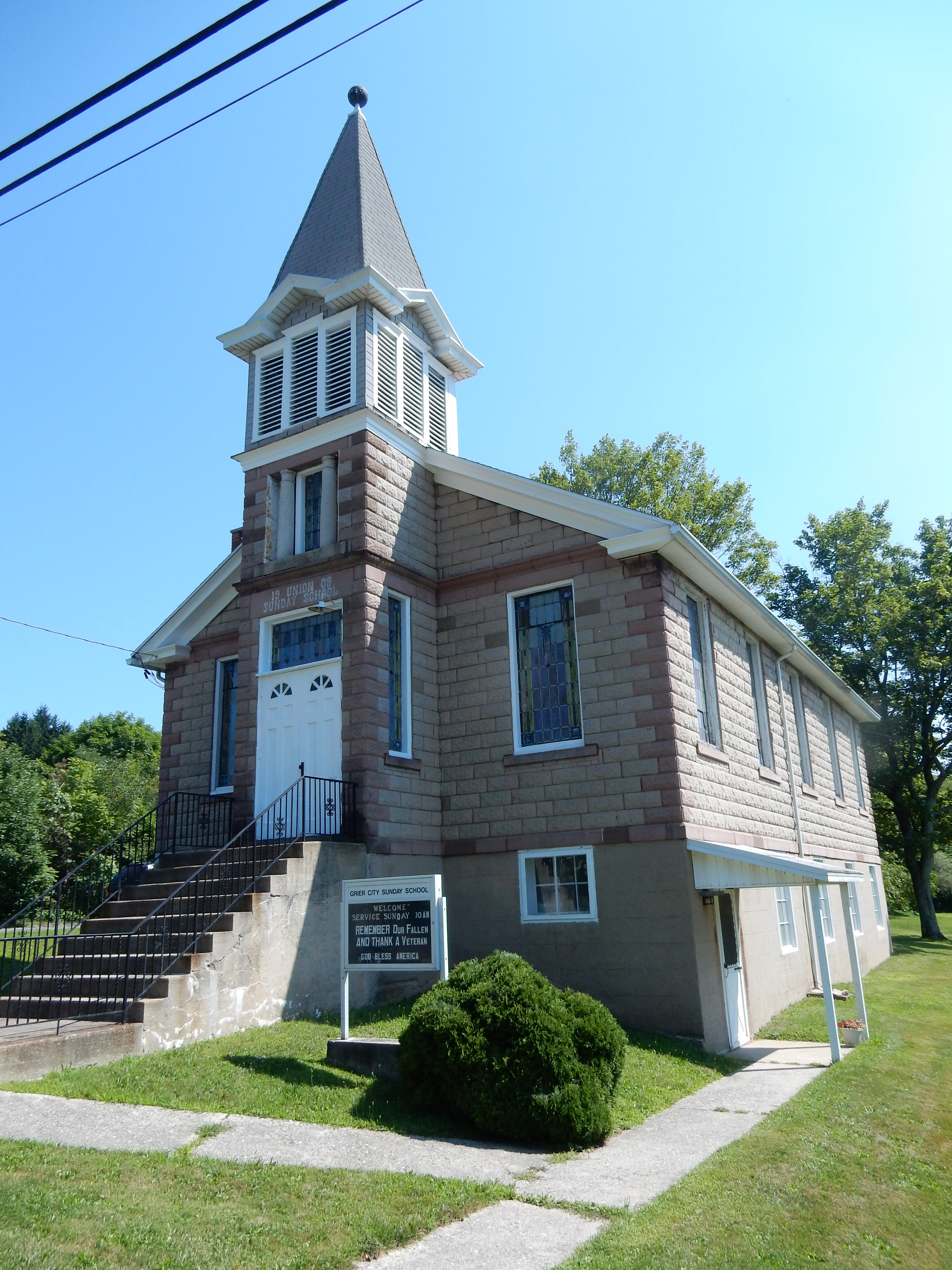
- Grier City Sunday School.
- Interactive map of Grier City, Pennsylvania
- Country: United States
- State: Pennsylvania
- County: Schuylkill

Government
  - Mayor: Luke Holman

Area
  - Total: 0.48 sq mi (1.25 km^{2})
  - Land: 0.48 sq mi (1.25 km^{2})
  - Water: 0 sq mi (0.00 km^{2})

Population (2020)
  - Total: 296
  - Density: 615.6/sq mi (237.67/km^{2})
- Time zone: UTC-5 (Eastern (EST))
  - Summer (DST): UTC-4 (EDT)
- FIPS code: 42-31536

Grier City is a census-designated place located in Rush Township, Schuylkill County in the state of Pennsylvania, United States. Grier City was part of the Grier City-Park Crest CDP for the 2000 census, before splitting into two separate CDPs for the 2010 census, the other being Park Crest. The community is located off Interstate 81. As of the 2010 census, the population was 241 residents. As of the 2020 census, the population was 296 residents.

== Demographics ==
Historical population
Census	Pop.	Note	%±
2020	296		—
U.S. Decennial Census
