= Hometown, Pennsylvania =

Unincorporated community in Pennsylvania, US

- Census-designated place
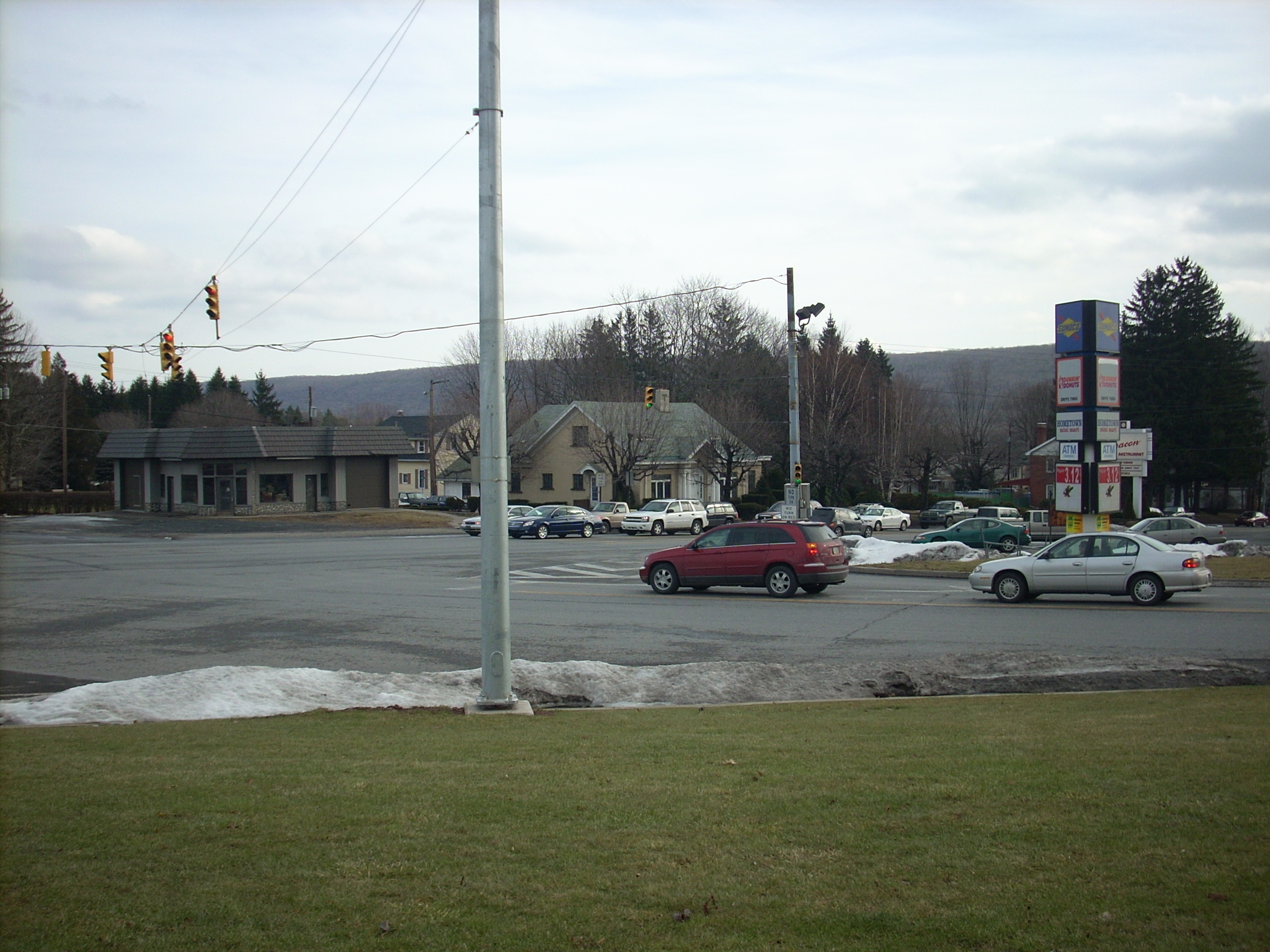
- The intersection of PA 54 and PA 309 in Hometown
- Interactive map of Hometown, Pennsylvania
- Coordinates: 40°49′25″N 75°58′49″W
- Country: United States
- State: Pennsylvania
- County: Schuylkill

Area
  - Total: 2.00 sq mi (5.17 km^{2})
  - Land: 2.00 sq mi (5.17 km^{2})
  - Water: 0 sq mi (0.00 km^{2})
- Elevation: 1,129 ft (344 m)

Population (2020)
  - Total: 1,414
  - Density: 707.8/sq mi (273.27/km^{2})
- Time zone: Eastern (EST)
  - Summer (DST): EDT
- Postal code: 18252
- Area code: 570
- FIPS code: 42-35448

Hometown is a village (a neighborhood, and now a census-designated place (CDP) once having a post office) in Rush Township, Schuylkill County, Pennsylvania, United States that sits astride a crossing point between important transportation corridors. The population was 1,399 at the 2000 census, and excepting for the area near the east–west PA 54 running mostly parallel to the tracks of the Reading, Blue Mountain, and Northern Railroad — once the important east–west shortline Nesquehoning & Mahanoy Railroad — and the PA 54 junction with PA 309.

== Geography ==
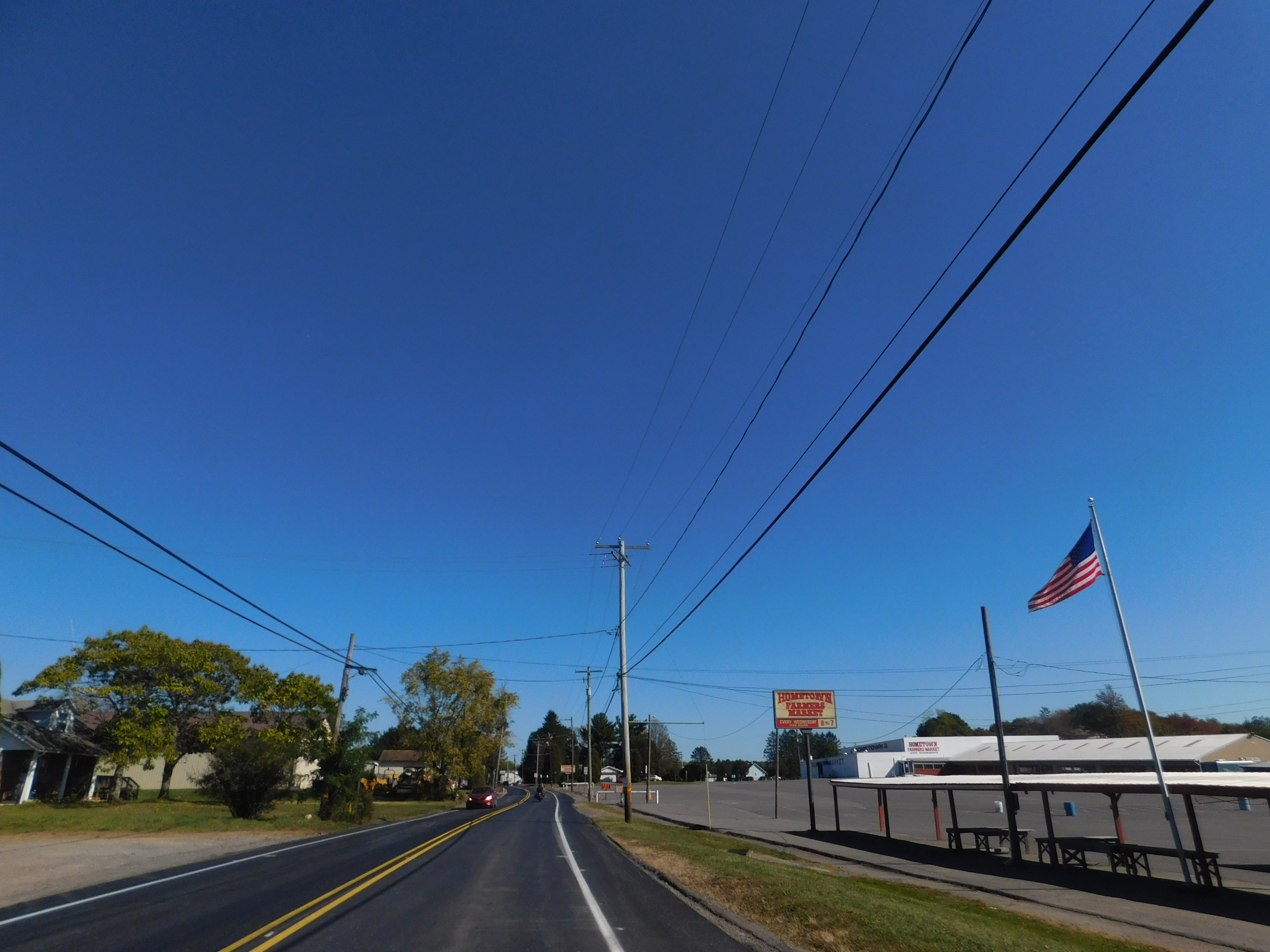
PA 54 eastbound in Hometown

Hometown is located at 40°49′20″N 75°59′2″W (40.822308, -75.983928).

According to the United States Census Bureau, the CDP has a total area of 2.0 square miles (5.2 km^{2}), all land. Hometown is located 2 miles (3.2 km) north of Tamaqua and 10 miles (16 km) south of Hazleton at the intersections of Route 54 and 309. Hometown's elevation is 1,129 feet (344 m) above sea level. It uses the Tamaqua zip code of 18252.

The oldest village in Rush Township, Hometown was founded by Messrs. Duncan of Philadelphia. They established a hotel in 1829, which was transferred to Jacob Faust in 1831. Tradition has it that Hometown was a favorite site of the original Native American inhabitants.

== Demographics ==
Historical population
Census	Pop.	Note	%±
2020	1,414		—
U.S. Decennial Census

As of the census of 2000, there were 1,399 people, 575 households, and 434 families living in the CDP. The population density was 706.3 inhabitants per square mile (272.7/km^{2}). There were 600 housing units at an average density of 302.9 per square mile (117.0/km^{2}). The racial makeup of the CDP was 98.43% White, 0.43% African American, 0.79% Asian, 0.07% from other races, and 0.29% from two or more races. Hispanic or Latino of any race were 0.50% of the population.

There were 575 households, out of which 24.5% had children under the age of 18 living with them, 69.0% were married couples living together, 4.3% had a female householder with no husband present, and 24.5% were non-families. 22.8% of all households were made up of individuals, and 13.9% had someone living alone who was 65 years of age or older. The average household size was 2.43 and the average family size was 2.85.

In the CDP, the population was spread out, with 19.4% under the age of 18, 4.4% from 18 to 24, 22.9% from 25 to 44, 31.0% from 45 to 64, and 22.3% who were 65 years of age or older. The median age was 47 years. For every 100 females, there were 92.4 males. For every 100 females age 18 and over, there were 90.1 males.

The median income for a household in the CDP was $40,568, and the median income for a family was $50,242. Males had a median income of $41,528 versus $30,536 for females. The per capita income for the CDP was $19,831. About 1.6% of families and 4.5% of the population were below the poverty line, including 8.2% of those under age 18 and 6.1% of those age 65 or over.
