= Tamaqua Area School District =

School district in Pennsylvania

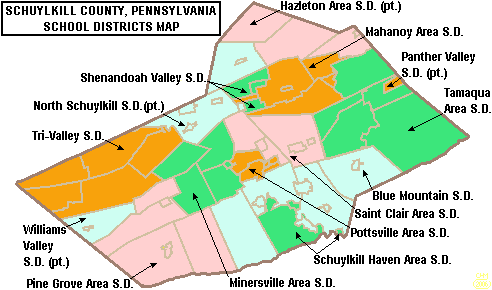
- Location of Tamaqua Area School District in Schuylkill County, Pennsylvania

Address
- 138 West Broad Street Tamaqua, Pennsylvania, 18252-0112; United States
- Coordinates: 40.5278295°N 75.4800104°W

District information
- Type: Public
- Schools: 4
- Budget: $36.537 million
- NCES District ID: 4223220

Students and staff
- Students: 2,048 (2024-25)
- Teachers: 140.00 (on an FTE basis)
- Student–teacher ratio: 14.63
- Colors: Blue and White

Other information
- Website: www.tamaqua.k12.pa.us

Tamaqua Area School District is a public school district in Schuylkill County, Pennsylvania. It serves the borough of Tamaqua and its surrounding townships of Rush Township (partial), Walker Township, Schuylkill Township, and West Penn Township. The district encompasses approximately 123 square miles.

As of 2024-25, the school district serves 2,048 students and employs 140.00 full-time teachers for a student-teacher ratio of 14.63, according to National Center for Education Statistics data.

Tamaqua Area School District operates two elementary schools (Tamaqua Elementary School, and West Penn Elementary School), one middle school (Tamaqua Area Middle School), and one high school (Tamaqua Area High School).

== Extracurriculars ==
Tamaqua Area School District offers an extensive variety of clubs, activities and sports. In 2012, the school board cut golf, tennis, and cheerleading due to budget constraints caused by the escalating teacher pension funding mandates.

In June 2013, the District agreed to permitting the Tamaqua Area Girls' Youth Softball Association to build a softball field at Rush Elementary School. The club received a $11,975 grant from Baseball Tomorrow Fund to fund the project.

Tamaqua High School is home to one of the first ESports teams in the area, founded in 2020. Just one year later the teams Valorant team placed 8th nationally in a country-wide competition. The team current has Rocket League, Valorant, Overwatch, and Super Smash Bros.

=== Music and the arts ===
Tamaqua Area High School has a continually growing arts programs. The Raider Marching Band has over 200 participating students as of the 2019–2020 school year. Those in marching band, besides those who do not play instruments, must also participate in the concert band. Every year, Tamaqua is able to send students to the Schuylkill County Band festival, and students also have the opportunity to audition for the PMEA District 10 Band Festival, in which they can advance to Region V Band and/or PMEA All-State Band. Many students in Tamaqua's history have represented the school at these festivals. Students in concert band may also choose to participate in jazz band. In 2022 only one student, Gianna Granick, was chosen from the entire 200+ marching band to represent the school in their District Band.

Tamaqua Area High School also has a chorus program that has been in existence for nearly 30 years. Students may participate in concert choir and/or jazz chorale, and students that wish to participate in jazz chorale must audition for it. Any student in jazz chorale is eligible to audition for the Schuylkill County Chorus festival, and Tamaqua has always been represented well at these festivals. Jazz chorale participants may also audition for the PMEA District 10 Chorus Festival, in which they can move on to Region V Chorus and/or PMEA All-State Chorus. There have also been many students that have represented Tamaqua at these festivals. As of the 2019–2020 school year, the concert choir has nearly 50 participants, and jazz chorale around the same.

Tamaqua Area High School even has a rapidly-growing drama club, which has consistently had over 80 cast and crew members.

=== Sports ===
Boys

- Baseball - AAA
- Basketball - AAA
- Cross country - AA
- Football (varsity & junior varsity) - AA
- Golf - AA
- Soccer - AA
- Swimming and diving - AA
- Track and field - AAA
- Wrestling - AA

Girls

- Basketball - AA
- Cross country - AA
- Golf - AA
- Soccer (fall) - AA
- Softball - AA
- Swimming and diving - AA
- Girls' tennis - AA
- Track and field - AA
- Volleyball - AA
- Wrestling - AA

Middle school

Boys

- Basketball
- Cross country
- Football (7th & 9th grade)
- Track and field
- Wrestling

Girls

- Basketball
- Cross country
- Track and field
- Wrestling

- According to PIAA directory July 2012
