= Catawissa Railroad =

Railroad in Pennsylvania, United States

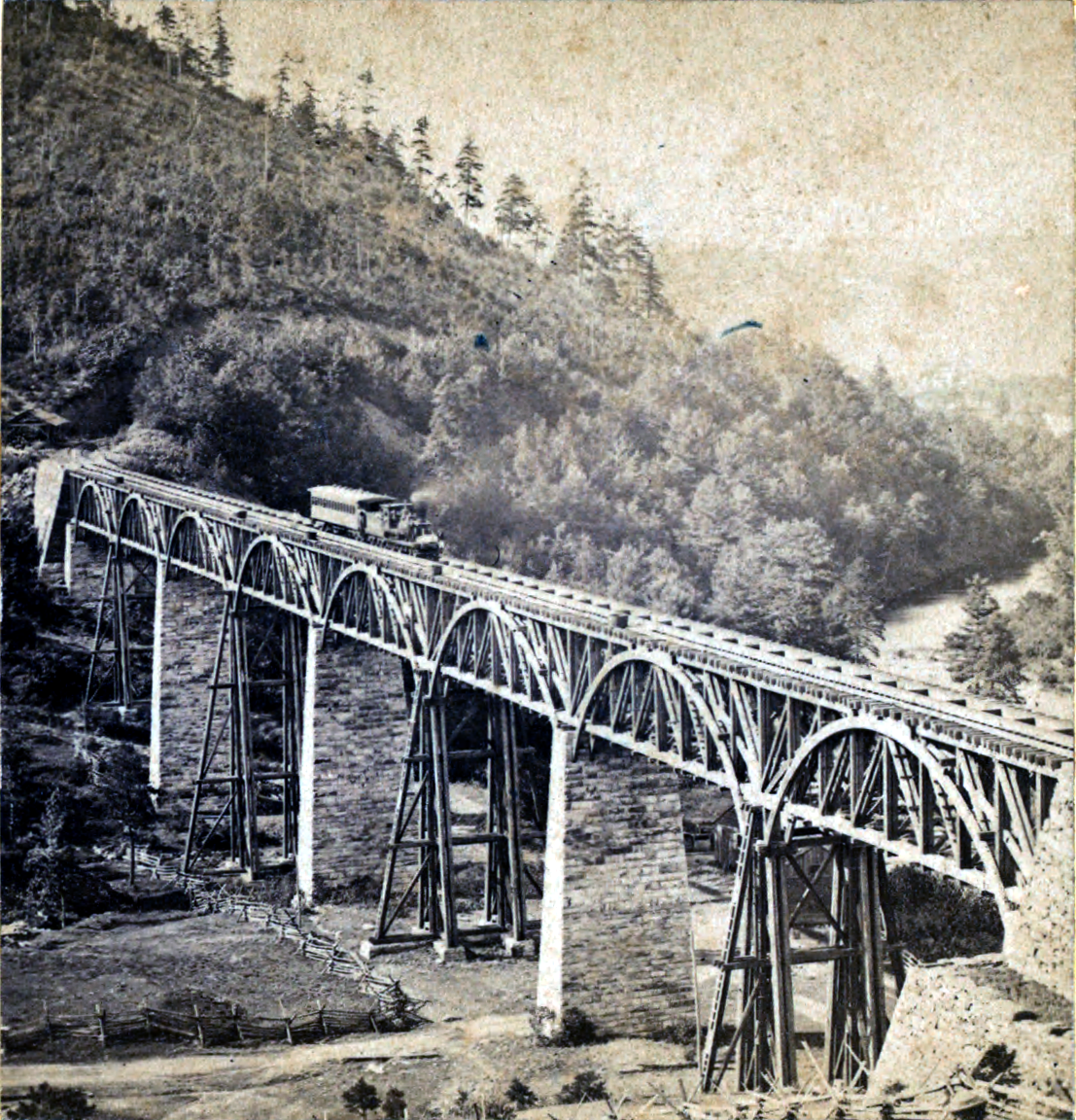
- Bridge at Mainville, Pennsylvania, 1860s

Overview
- Headquarters: Philadelphia
- Locale: Lycoming, Montour, Northumberland, Columbia and Schuylkill Counties, Pennsylvania
- Dates of operation: 1860–1953
- Predecessor: Catawissa, Williamsport and Erie Railroad
- Successor: Reading Company

Technical
- Track gauge: 4 ft 8 1/2 in (1,435 mm) standard gauge
- Length: 98.5 miles (158.5 km)

The Catawissa Railroad was a railroad that operated in Pennsylvania between 1860 and 1953. For most of its lifespan it was leased by the Reading Company, and was subsequently merged into the Reading.

== History ==
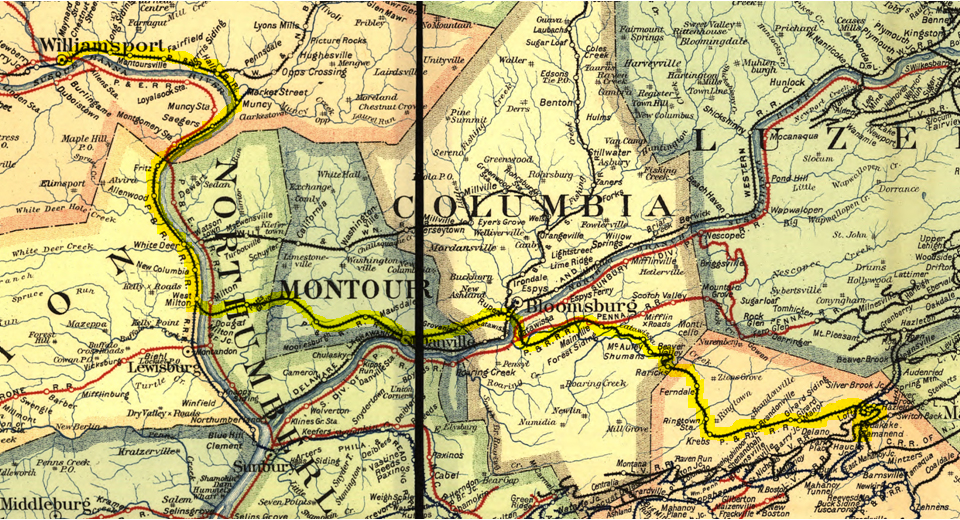
Catawissa Railroad map as of 1895

The original company was chartered as the Little Schuylkill and Susquehanna Railroad in 1831. It planned to build a rail line between Tamanend (also called Little Schuylkill Junction; west of Tamaqua) and Milton. The principals in the company included Christian Brobst and Joseph Paxton of Catawissa. Construction began c. 1835, but the banking panic of 1837 restricted investments needed to continue work on the railroad.

In 1849 the company reorganized, to attract new investors, and became the Catawissa, Williamsport and Erie Railroad (CW&E). In the early 1850s construction resumed, and in 1854 the railroad reached Milton, where it connected with the Sunbury and Erie Railroad (renamed the Philadelphia and Erie in 1861). At Tamanend the railroad connected with the Little Schuylkill Navigation Railroad, which ran along the Little Schuylkill River to Tamaqua and Port Clinton, where it connected to the Reading Company. CW&E passenger train operations between Catawissa and Tamaqua began in July 1854. A bridge across the Susquehanna River to Rupert was completed in 1855. The 65 miles (105 km) route traversed some difficult terrain, and included three tunnels, and eight bridges and trestles.

Express train service from Philadelphia to Buffalo, Niagara Falls and Chicago began on 7 May 1855, using the CW&E, as well as the Reading and Little Schuylkill Navigation lines.

The CW&E went bankrupt in 1859, and reorganized as the Catawissa Railroad (CRR) in 1860. In 1865 the Western Central Railroad and the Atlantic and Great Western Railroad attempted to lease the Catawissa RR. The leases were challenged by the Philadelphia & Erie in litigation, and eventually they were upheld by the Pennsylvania Supreme Court. However, the A&GW declared bankruptcy in 1867, and the CRR then proceeded to operate the line by itself. As of 1868 the company owned 21 locomotives and 269 cars.

The company built an engine house and machine shop in Catawissa, on land donated by the town, in 1861. Other support buildings were added to the 12-acre site through 1901. A passenger station was erected in 1878.

In 1871 the Catawissa Railroad extended its main line from Milton to Williamsport. The Reading Company leased the Catawissa lines in 1872. In 1893 the CRR lines were consolidated with the Reading's Shamokin Branch.

The CRR was formally merged with the Reading Company in 1953. The Reading abandoned various sections of the Catawissa Branch later in the 1950s, through the 1960s. In 1976 the Reading was acquired by Conrail, which abandoned the remaining portions of the Catawissa Branch.

== Bridges ==
The railroad's bridge over Dark Run was 546 feet (166 m) high and 574 feet (175 m) long. The bridge at Mainville, the only one in Columbia County, was 115 feet (35 m) high and 727 feet (222 m) long.

== See also ==
- List of Pennsylvania railroads
