= Quakake, Pennsylvania =

Unincorporated community in Pennsylvania, US

- Unincorporated community
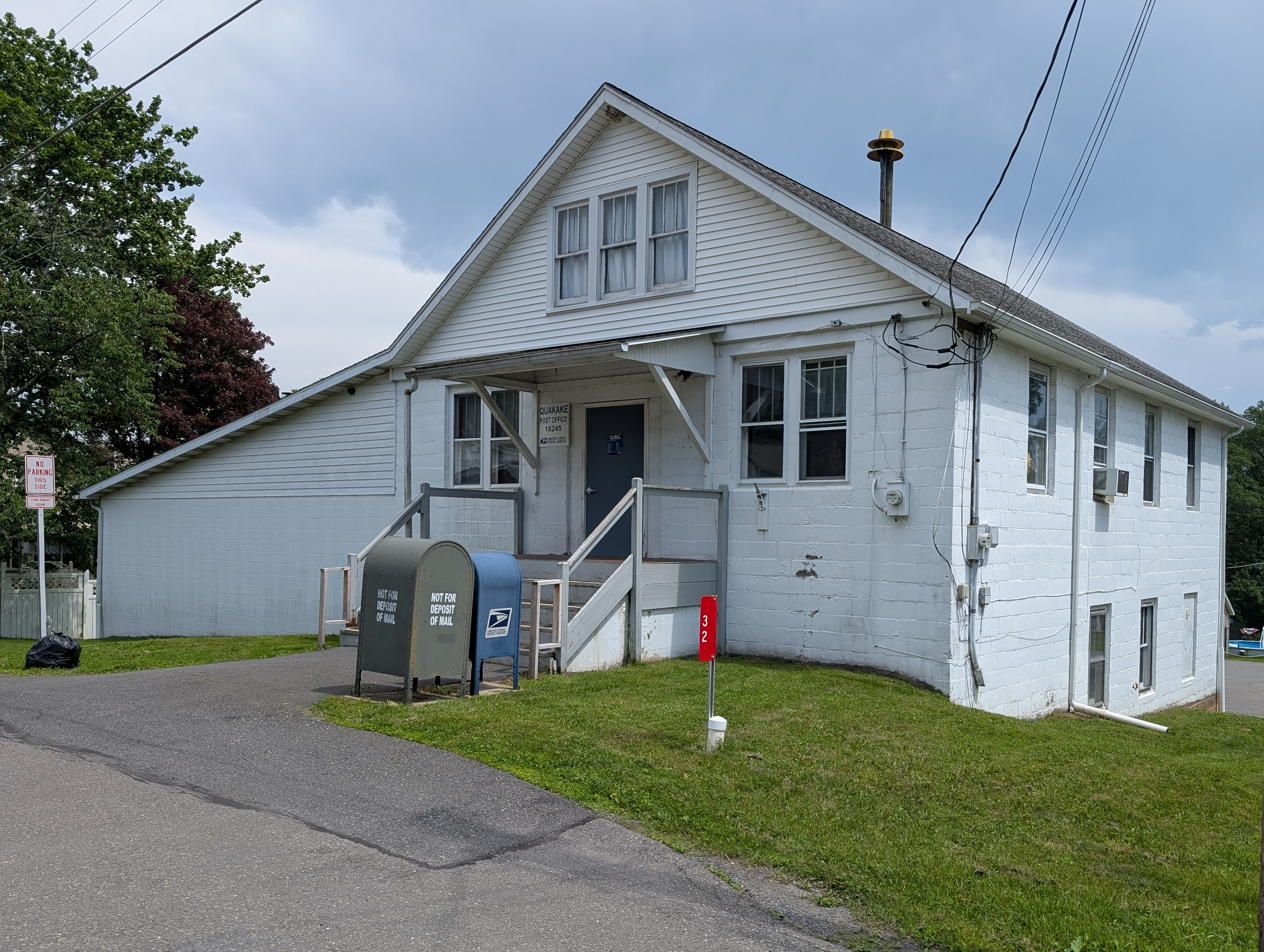
- Quakake USPS post office

- Location within Pennsylvania Location within the United States
- Coordinates: 40°51′06″N 76°02′10″W
- Country: United States
- State: Pennsylvania
- County: Schuylkill
- Township: Rush
- Elevation: 1,283 ft (391 m)
- Time zone: UTC-5 (Eastern (EST))
  - Summer (DST): UTC-4 (EDT)
- ZIP Code: 18245
- Area code: 570
- GNIS feature ID: 1184516

Quakake is an unincorporated community that is located in Rush Township, Schuylkill County, Pennsylvania, United States.

== History ==
Quakake is a Native American name purported to mean "pine lands".

== Demographics ==
The Quakake ZIP Code 18245 covers 3.61 sq mi (9.3 km^{2}), a population of 348 and 158 housing units, 141 of them occupied. The community is in Area Code 570, served by the 467 exchange.
