= Ryan Township, Pennsylvania =

Township in Pennsylvania, US

Coordinates: 40°47′00″N 76°07′59″W

- Township
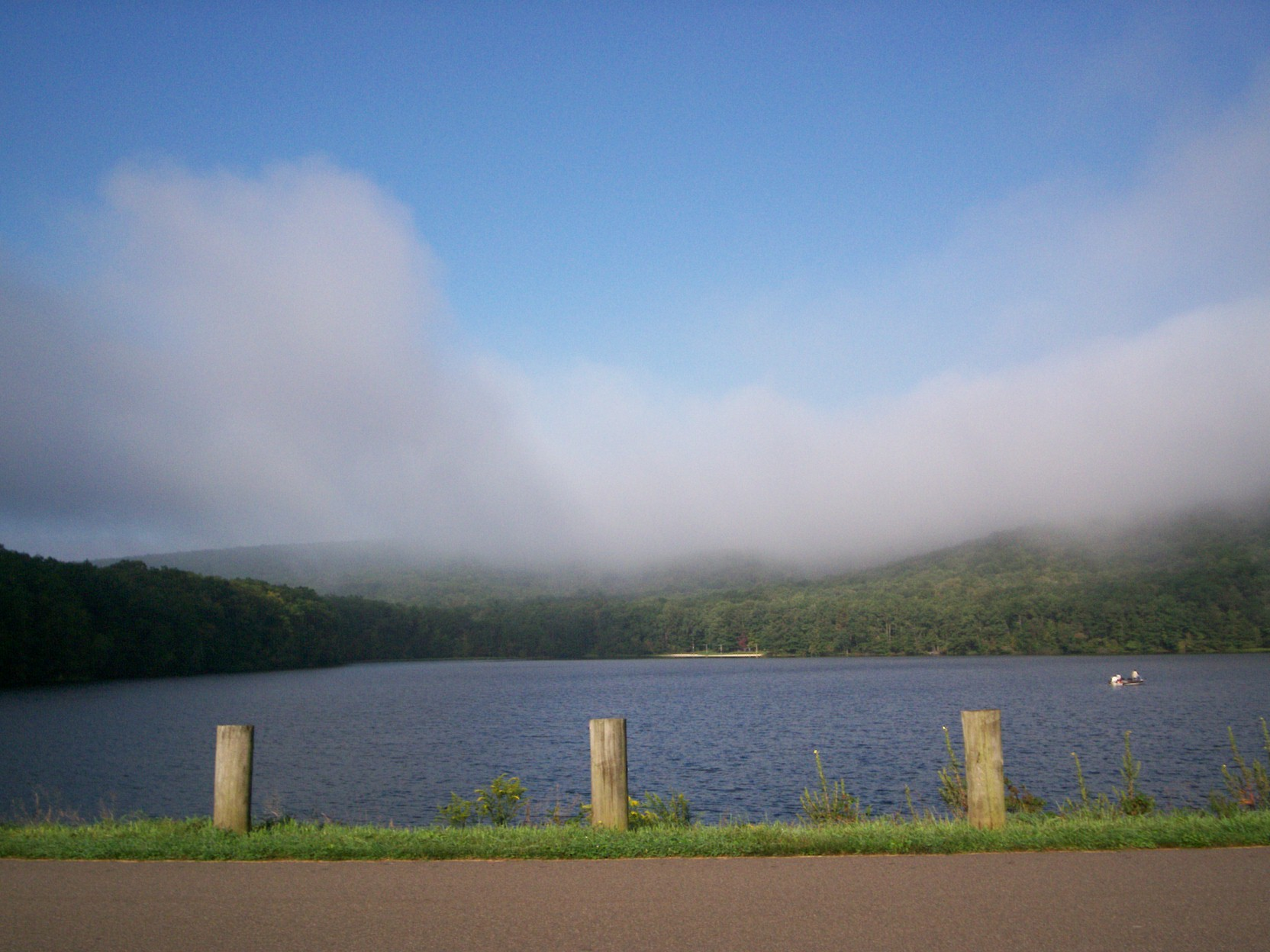
- Locust Lake State Park

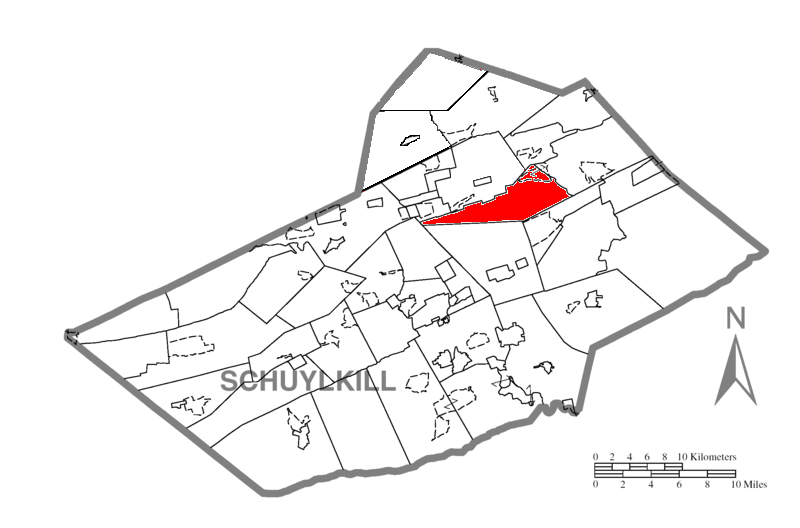
- Map of Schuylkill County, Pennsylvania Highlighting Ryan Township

- Map of Schuylkill County, Pennsylvania
- Country: United States
- State: Pennsylvania
- County: Schuylkill
- Settled: 1784
- Incorporated: 1868

Area
  - Total: 17.97 sq mi (46.54 km^{2})
  - Land: 17.71 sq mi (45.86 km^{2})
  - Water: 0.27 sq mi (0.69 km^{2})

Population (2020)
  - Total: 2,526 ▲
  - Estimate (2021): 2,533
  - Density: 142.2/sq mi (54.91/km^{2})
- Time zone: UTC-5 (Eastern (EST))
  - Summer (DST): UTC-4 (EDT)
- FIPS code: 42-107-66944

Ryan Township is a township in Schuylkill County, Pennsylvania, United States. The population was 2,526 at the 2020 census.

== Geography ==
According to the United States Census Bureau, the township has a total area of 18.1 square miles (47.0 km^{2}), of which 17.9 square miles (46.4 km^{2}) is land and 0.2 square mile (0.6 km^{2}) (1.38%) is water.

== Demographics ==
Historical population
Census	Pop.	Note	%±
2010	2,459		—
2020	2,526		2.7%
2021 (est.)	2,533		0.3%
U.S. Decennial Census

At the 2000 census there were 1,451 people, 555 households, and 425 families living in the township. The population density was 81.1 inhabitants per square mile (31.3/km^{2}). There were 613 housing units at an average density of 34.3 per square mile (13.2/km^{2}). The racial makeup of the township was 99.66% White, 0.14% African American, 0.07% from other races, and 0.14% from two or more races. Hispanic or Latino of any race were 0.83%.

Of the 555 households 30.6% had children under the age of 18 living with them, 63.1% were married couples living together, 7.6% had a female householder with no husband present, and 23.4% were non-families. 20.4% of households were one person and 9.2% were one person aged 65 or older. The average household size was 2.61 and the average family size was 3.00.

The age distribution was 22.3% under the age of 18, 7.0% from 18 to 24, 24.7% from 25 to 44, 32.3% from 45 to 64, and 13.7% 65 or older. The median age was 42 years. For every 100 females there were 103.2 males. For every 100 females age 18 and over, there were 102.7 males.

The median household income was $43,456 and the median family income was $48,947. Males had a median income of $35,938 versus $24,250 for females. The per capita income for the township was $20,403. About 6.8% of families and 7.9% of the population were below the poverty line, including 8.3% of those under age 18 and 15.9% of those age 65 or over.
