= Tamanend, Pennsylvania =

Unincorporated community in Pennsylvania, U.S.

Coordinates: 40°50′37″N 76°02′22″W

Tamanend is an unincorporated community in Schuylkill County, in the U.S. state of Pennsylvania.

== History ==
The community was named after Tamanend, a Native American chieftain.
