= Brandon Knarr =

American baseball player (born 1998)

Free agent
- Pitcher
- Born: June 2, 1998 (age 28); York, Pennsylvania, U.S.
- Bats: Right Throws: Left
- Stats at Baseball Reference

Brandon Derl Knarr (born June 2, 1998) is an American professional baseball pitcher who is a free agent.

== Amateur career ==
Knarr attended Penn Manor High School in Millersville, Pennsylvania, as a freshman before transferring to Eastern York High School in Wrightsville, Pennsylvania, where he played three years on their baseball team. He went unselected in the 2017 Major League Baseball draft and enrolled at the University of Notre Dame to play college baseball.

Knarr pitched only 5 2/3 innings at Notre Dame as a freshman in 2018, and transferred to the College of Central Florida for his sophomore season in 2019. For Central Florida, he started 13 games and went 6-1 with a 4.66 ERA. After the season's end, he transferred to the University of Tampa with whom he played in six games with a 2.55 ERA before the season was cancelled due to the COVID-19 pandemic.

== Professional career ==
=== Milwaukee Brewers ===
Knarr went unselected in the shortened 2020 Major League Baseball draft and signed with the Milwaukee Brewers as an undrafted free agent.

Knarr made his professional debut in 2021 with the Carolina Mudcats and was promoted to the Wisconsin Timber Rattlers in August. Over 21 games (18 starts) between the two teams, he went 8-3 with a 4.35 ERA and 128 strikeouts over 97 1/3 innings. He opened the 2022 season with Timber Rattlers and was promoted to the Biloxi Shuckers in mid-June. Over 26 starts between the two teams, Knarr went 11-8 with a 2.83 ERA and 152 strikeouts over 146 1/3 innings. He returned to Biloxi to open the 2023 season, but pitched only 12 innings during the season due to injury. He made three rehab appearances with the rookie-level Arizona Complex League Brewers in 2024.

Knarr did not play in a game in 2025, and was released by the Brewers organization on September 29, 2025.

=== York Revolution ===
On March 5, 2026, Knarr signed with the Cleburne Railroaders of the American Association of Professional Baseball. However, on May 12, Knarr was traded to the York Revolution of the Atlantic League of Professional Baseball in exchange for a player to be named later. He made two appearances for the team, recording a 6.75 ERA with no strikeouts across 1 1/3 innings pitched. Knarr was released by the Revolution on June 1.
