= G. Harold Watkins =

American politician (1903–1991)

Member of the Pennsylvania Senate from the 29th district
- In office 1941–1944
- Preceded by: Joseph P. Dando
- Succeeded by: Paul L. Wagner

Personal details
- Born: January 3, 1903 Girardville, Pennsylvania
- Died: August 4, 1991 (aged 88) Ashland, Pennsylvania
- Party: Republican

G. Harold Watkins (January 3, 1903 – August 4, 1991) was an American politician who served as a Republican member of the Pennsylvania State Senate from 1941 to 1944 and as a Commonwealth judge from 1957 until 1978.

== Formative years ==
Watkins was born in Girardville, Schuylkill County, Pennsylvania, to George H. Watkins and Florence M. Sykes on January 3, 1903. He married Nellie Benashumas (1911–2005) of Shenandoah, Pennsylvania. Watkins graduated from Pennsylvania State University in 1924 and earned a law degree from Harvard University in 1929.

Beginning in 1930, Watkins practiced law in Girardville. He was then elected to the senate.

Afterwards, he remained active in politics, serving as a delegate to the Republican National Convention from Pennsylvania in 1948, 1952, 1956, and chairing the Schuylkill County Republican Party in 1953. That same year, he served as secretary for the Pennsylvania State Senate. He then assumed a post as superior court judge in Pennsylvania, serving from 1957 until 1978. He was the president judge during the final four years of his tenure. He continued to hear cases as a senior judge until 1989.

Watkins and his wife had a daughter, Pamela Watkins (born 1943). In 1968, she married Frederick H. Hobbs (1934–2005), a state senator from the 29th District.

== Death ==
Watkins died on August 4, 1991, in Ashland, Pennsylvania.

Party political offices
Preceded by	Republican nominee for Auditor General of Pennsylvania; 1944	Succeeded by Weldon Brinton Heyburn
