= Charles W. Staudenmeier =

American politician

Member of the Pennsylvania Senate from the 29th district
- In office 1933–1936
- Preceded by: Robert D. Heaton
- Succeeded by: Joseph P. Dando

Personal details
- Born: November 4, 1894 Ashland, Pennsylvania
- Died: January 12, 1988 Ashland, Pennsylvania
- Party: Republican

Charles W. Staudenmeier (November 4, 1894 – January 12, 1988) was a Republican Pennsylvania State Senator from 1933 to 1936. He also served in the Pennsylvania House of Representatives for 10 consecutive years from 1923 until 1932. Later he was elected as a Schuylkill County judge from 1947 to 1967.

== History ==
Staudenmeier was the son of Joseph Staudenmeier (1856-1944) and Margaret Lutz (1852-1950). He married Sara E. Daley on August 20, 1922. He had four children, Charles W. Jr, Dr. James J, Margaret Whalen, and Sally Margraf. He graduated from Ashland High School in 1912 and went on to attend Villanova University before graduating from Dickinson School of Law in 1916. Staudenmeier joined the United States Army shortly thereafter and served during World War I as an instructor at Camp Meigs, Washington, DC. When he returned to Ashland, he began his law practice in Ashland and Pottsville.

He first ran for public office in 1922 and won election to the Pennsylvania House of Representatives. He served 4 more consecutive terms there and also served as Assistant District Attorney for Schuylkill County from 1927 to 1929, serving under Charles A. Snyder, who had served in the State Senate earlier. He then ran for the Pennsylvania Senate in 1932, winning the 29th District. During his tenure there he was a vehement opponent of New Deal policies being passed in Washington. This led to his defeat at the polls in 1936 to Joseph P. Dando, the first Democratic Party Senator from this District in the 20th century.

After his legislative service, he served as solicitor for Schuylkill County; was elected, judge, Schuylkill County Court of Common Pleas in 1947 (winning by less than 800 votes) and served for twenty consecutive years until 1967. While a judge, Staudenmeier presided during the 1961 trial of Ralph Staino, Jr., Robert H. Poulson and John C. Berkery who stole nearly $500,000 from Pottsville coal magnate, John B. Rich, whom another Pottsville mogul had revealed the presence of cash at Rich's home to Staino's girlfriend, showgirl, Lillian (Tiger Lil) Reis. Staudenmeier also served as the Appeals Agent for the Selective Service and as President of the Citizen's National Bank in Ashland.

He died at the age of 93 on January 12, 1988 in Ashland, Pennsylvania.
