= Pennsylvania's 29th Senate district =

American legislative district

Pennsylvania's 29th State Senate district
Senator
Dave Argall; R–Rush Township, Schuylkill County
- Population (2021): 264,845

Pennsylvania State Senate District 29 includes part of Luzerne County and all of Carbon County and Schuylkill County. It is currently represented by Republican Dave Argall.

== District profile ==
The district includes the following areas:

All of Carbon County

Luzerne County

- Bear Creek Township
- Bear Creek Village
- Buck Township
- Dennison Township
- Foster Township
- Freeland
- Hazle Township
- Hazleton
- Jeddo
- Penn Lake Park
- West Hazleton
- White Haven

All of Schuylkill County

== Senators ==
Representative	Party	Years	Hometown	Notes	Counties
Charles E. Quail	Republican	1900–1906		Schuylkill County bifurcated by Districts 29 and 30.	Schuylkill (part)
Charles E. Quail	Republican	1907–1908			Schuylkill
Charles A. Snyder	Republican	1909–1917		Resigned on April 20, 1917, to run for Pennsylvania State Auditor.	Schuylkill
Vacant		1917–1918			
Robert D. Heaton	Republican	1919–1920			Schuylkill (part)
Robert D. Heaton	Republican	1921–1932			Schuylkill
Charles W. Staudenmeier	Republican	1933–1936			Schuylkill
Joseph P. Dando	Democratic	1937–1940			Schuylkill
G. Harold Watkins	Republican	1941–1944			Schuylkill
Paul L. Wagner	Republican	1945–1964		Wagner ran against Albert I. Nagle in 1964. The results of that election were inconclusive and neither candidate was able to claim the Senatorial seat.	Schuylkill
Vacant		1965–1966			
Frederick H. Hobbs	Republican	1967–1972			Carbon, Schuylkill
Frederick H. Hobbs	Republican	1973–1976			Carbon, Schuylkill, Monroe (part)
Joseph E. Gurzenda	Democratic	1977–1980			Carbon, Schuylkill, Monroe
James J. Rhoades	Republican	1981–1992		Died October 18, 2008	Carbon, Schuylkill, Monroe
James J. Rhoades	Republican	1993–2004		Died October 18, 2008	Carbon, Schuylkill, Montour
James J. Rhoades	Republican	2005–2008		Died October 18, 2008	Schuylkill, Berks (part), Carbon (part), Lehigh (part), Monroe (part), Northampton (part)
Dave Argall	Republican	2009–2012		Elected March 3, 2009 to fill vacancy.	Schuylkill, Berks (part), Carbon (part), Lehigh (part), Monroe (part), Northampton (part)
Dave Argall	Republican	2013–present		Elected March 3, 2009 to fill vacancy.	Schuylkill, Berks (part)
