= Jamie Barton =

Jamie Barton may refer to:

- Jamie Barton (singer) (born 1981), American mezzo-soprano singer
- Jamie Barton (politician), member of the Pennsylvania House of Representatives
