= Senator Hobbs =

Senator Hobbs may refer to:

- Albert Hobbs (1822–1897), New York State Senate
- Alexander R. Hobbs (1852–1929), Virginia State Senate
- Frederick Hobbs (Pennsylvania politician) (1934–2005), Pennsylvania State Senate
- Katie Hobbs (born 1969), Arizona State Senate
- Steve Hobbs (Washington politician) (born 1970), Washington State Senate
