= Jon Witman =

American football player (born 1972)

No. 38
- Position: Fullback

Personal information
- Born: June 1, 1972 (age 54); Wrightsville, Pennsylvania, U.S.
- Listed height: 6 ft 2 in (1.88 m)
- Listed weight: 240 lb (109 kg)

Career information
- College: Penn State
- NFL draft: 1996: 3rd round, 92nd overall pick

Career history
- Pittsburgh Steelers (1996–2001)

Career NFL statistics
- Rushing yards: 129
- Rushing average: 3.5
- Receptions: 39
- Receiving yards: 263
- Stats at Pro Football Reference

Jon Doyle Witman (born June 1, 1972) is an American former professional football player. He played college football at Penn State and was a Pittsburgh Steelers fullback for six seasons (1996–2001).

== Early life ==
Witman was born in 1972 to young parents (then 21 and 17) and was raised in Wrightsville, Pennsylvania, a small borough along the Susquehanna River, east of York in the south central part of the state. He played football at Eastern York High School in Wrightsville, where he led the team in back-to-back titles. From there Witman moved to Penn State and was a member of its 1994 undefeated Rose Bowl-winning Nittany Lions football team, pairing with Brian Milne at the fullback position.

== Pittsburgh Steelers ==
In 1996, Witman was the 92nd draft pick, in the third round by the Pittsburgh Steelers, with whom he started 43 games until his retirement in 2001. He had not been available for any combines, due to a hamstring injury. In his rookie year with the Steelers, Witman earned the team's "Joe Greene Great Performance Award". He got hurt five games into the 2000 season and Dan Kreider took the fullback position for the remaining 10 games. Witman returned for the 2001 season and his last game was the Steelers' January 2002 AFC Championship loss to the New England Patriots.

== Struggles ==
Witman lost over $1 million in the 2008 financial crisis and as of late 2016, he was going through chapter 13 bankruptcy. Continuing pain from back and ankle fusion surgeries kept him from daily work and he gave his landscaping business to his brother. Witman became addicted to opioid medication and had two DUI crashes in 2016, both for which he was sentenced in 2017. Faced with severe depression, he considered suicide in 2014 but his wife found help through the National Football League Players Association. After months in detox, rehab, and a halfway house, and more rehab after some relapses, in March 2018 he was reported as having been clean and sober since November 2016.

== Personal life ==
Witman's father, Keith, a Vietnam-Marine who worked for 30 years at York's Harley-Davidson plant, died of cancer in February 2018. Witman has been partnered with his wife since 1990, the start of their junior year in high school. An initial date didn't go well two years earlier, but they got back together after it became evident he was still interested. One of their four sons, Cole, played lacrosse at Eastern York High School as of 2017. Cole transferred to York Catholic High School for his last two seasons before committing in 2019 to college lacrosse at the University of Tampa. In 2020, he was named to the Sunshine State Conference spring honor roll, and in 2021 was on the lacrosse team roster at York College of Pennsylvania.
