= Wrightsville Historic District =

Historic district in Pennsylvania, United States

- U.S. National Register of Historic Places
- U.S. Historic district
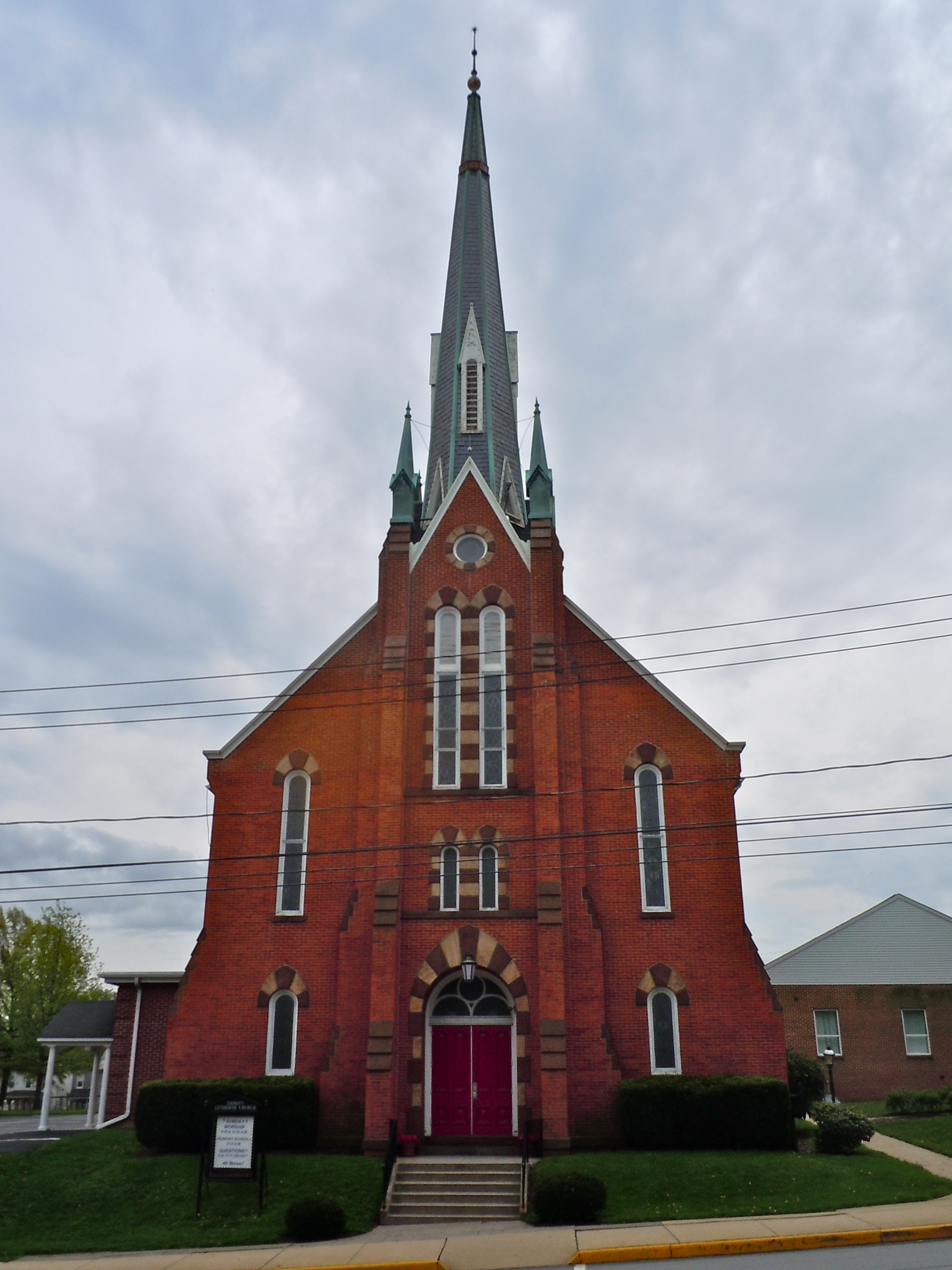
- Lutheran church in Wrightsville Historic District, April 2011

- Location within Pennsylvania Location within the United States
- Location: Roughly bounded by the Susquehanna River, Vine, 4th, and Willow Sts., Wrightsville, Pennsylvania
- Coordinates: 40°01′26″N 76°31′41″W
- Area: 129.5 acres (52.4 ha)
- Built: 1790
- Built by: Multiple
- Architectural style: Mixed (more Than 2 Styles From Different Periods), Other, Federal, Georgian Vernacular
- NRHP reference No.: 83002291
- Added to NRHP: September 12, 1983

The Wrightsville Historic District is a national historic district that is located in Wrightsville in York County, Pennsylvania.

It was listed on the National Register of Historic Places in 1983.

== History and architectural features ==
This district includes 350 contributing buildings and five contributing structures that are located in the central business district and surround residential areas of Wrightsville. A majority of the dwellings are small, frame, vernacular, workers' houses that date to the nineteenth century. More substantial brick and stone dwellings date to as early as the 1790s. Notable industrial buildings and structures include the Wrightsville Hardware Complex, the McConkey Building, the Wrightsville silk mill, and lime kilns.
