= Charles A. Snyder =

American politician

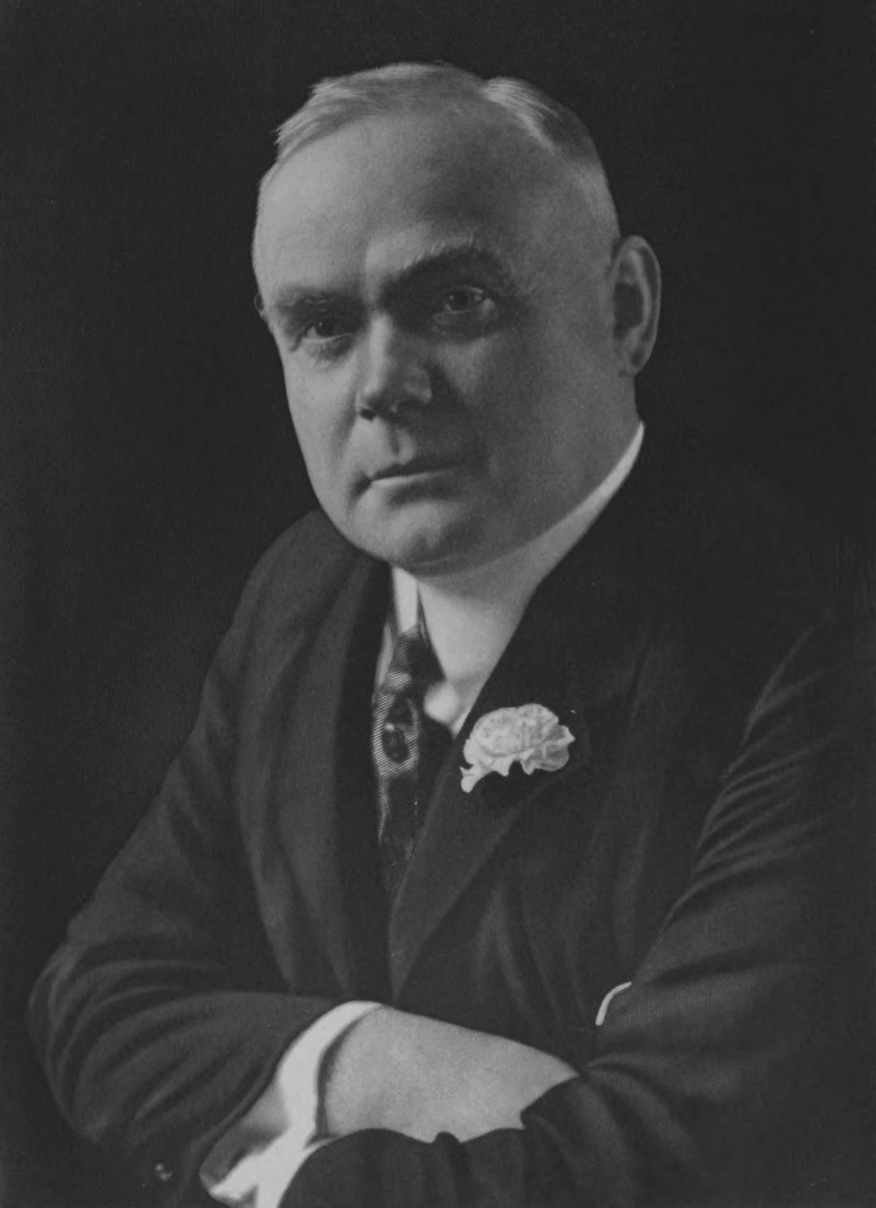

29th Auditor General of Pennsylvania
- In office 1917–1921
- Governor: Martin Grove Brumbaugh; William Cameron Sproul
- Preceded by: Archibald W. Powell
- Succeeded by: Samuel S. Lewis

Member of the Pennsylvania Senate from the 29th district
- In office 1909–1917
- Preceded by: Charles E. Quail
- Succeeded by: Robert D. Heaton

56th Treasurer of Pennsylvania
- In office 1921–1925

Personal details
- Born: April 16, 1867 Pillow, Pennsylvania, U.S.
- Died: December 7, 1931 (aged 64) Pottsville, Pennsylvania, U.S.
- Party: Republican
- Spouse: Laura R. Arters (m. 1891; died 1929)
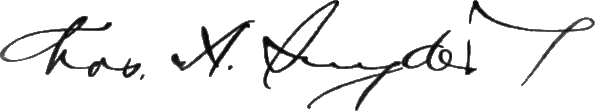
- Signature

Charles A. Snyder (April 16, 1867 – December 7, 1931) was a Republican politician from Schuylkill County, Pennsylvania. He served as a Pennsylvania State Representative, Pennsylvania State Senator, then State Auditor General and finally State Treasurer.

== Biography ==
Snyder was born in Pillow, Dauphin County, Pennsylvania on April 16, 1867 to William Herb Snyder (1844–1910) and Leah Hoeffer Brua (1843–1921). His father served in the Union Army in both the 108th and the 172nd companies of the Pennsylvania Volunteer Regiments. Snyder was educated in public schools and private schools; read for the law and was admitted to the Schuylkill County Bar in 1889. Snyder was a member of the Pennsylvania National Guard; served as a deputy district attorney and solicitor for Pottsville, Schuylkill County; then as the county controller and county solicitor. He married Laura R. Arters (1867–1929) on May 21, 1891. He was given the nickname of "Carnation Charley" for his lifelong habit of wearing a fresh flower every day in his lapel. He was also a dapper dresser who was often seen in a light suit, wearing gloves and spats, and a soft brown hat.

Snyder was elected as a Republican to the Pennsylvania House of Representatives in 1903 and then re-elected to the House to serve two more consecutive terms until 1908. He was not a candidate for reelection to the House but ran and was elected to the Pennsylvania State Senate where he served from 1909 until April 20, 1917, when he resigned to run for Pennsylvania State Auditor.

He was elected as State Auditor until 1921, running both as a Republican and member of the Bull Moose Party. Snyder then ran for Pennsylvania State Treasurer, winning and serving from 1921 to 1924. He was also elected as Chairman of the State Workmen’s Compensation Board in 1921.

His statewide elected political career ended in 1924 when he lost the election to return to the Pennsylvania State Senate in 1924. Snyder did receive an appointment as special deputy, Pennsylvania Auditor General's office (1925–1926).

However, Snyder returned to local politics and was elected District Attorney for Schuylkill County in 1927 and was re-elected in 1931 but died suddenly on December 7, 1931, in his office in Pottsville, on the day before he was to be sworn in for his second term. He was 64 years old and as noted by Governor Gifford Pinchot, a "no more vital and colorful figure has existed in my time in Pennsylvania politics."

Party political offices
Preceded by Harmon M. Kephart	Republican nominee for Treasurer of Pennsylvania; 1920	Succeeded by Samuel S. Lewis
Political offices
Preceded by Archibald W. Powell	Auditor General of Pennsylvania; 1917–1921	Succeeded by Samuel S. Lewis
