= Jerry Knowles =

American politician

Member of the Pennsylvania House of Representatives from the 124th district
- In office May 19, 2009 – November 30, 2022
- Preceded by: Dave Argall
- Succeeded by: Jamie Barton

Personal details
- Born: July 30, 1948 (age 77) Coaldale, Pennsylvania, U.S.
- Party: Republican
- Spouse: Lorraine

Jerome P. Knowles (born July 30, 1948) is a former Republican member of the Pennsylvania House of Representatives for the 124th legislative district.

Knowles was first elected in a special election in May 2009 to fill the vacancy left by Dave Argall, who was elected to the Pennsylvania State Senate to succeed the late Senator James J. Rhoades. He defeated his Democratic opponent, Bill Mackey, with more than 70% of the vote.

== Career ==
Prior to his election to the Pennsylvania General Assembly, Knowles served as councilman and mayor of Tamaqua, Pennsylvania and later a Schuylkill County commissioner.

Knowles sat on the Judiciary and Local Government committees. He announced in February 2022 that he would not seek re-election. He was succeeded by businessman Jamie Barton.

=== Political positions ===
Knowles opposes legalizing adult-use cannabis in Pennsylvania, calling it a "dangerous and illegal drug". He also opposes lessening the criminal penalties of cannabis possession. In addition, he introduced a bill that would eliminate state funding to municipalities that support or operate safe injection sites for drug users.

During the COVID-19 pandemic, Knowles put out a statement advocating for his constituents to stay vigilant he voted to end the Governor's emergency stay-at-home order and pushed for the governor to ease restrictions on his county. As public schools began to consider reopening for in-person classes, Knowles began soliciting co-sponsors for legislation that would roll back mandatory mask wearing in schools for young children, which he believed was an impractical mandate and a decision that should be made by individuals and schools.

In March 2020, Knowles yelled at one of two openly gay lawmakers in the Pennsylvania House of Representatives, calling him a "little girl" as he was speaking on the floor wearing a rainbow mask. In 2018, he signed onto a letter asking to eliminate LGBTQ+ inclusive birth certificates. The letter asked that Pennsylvania resume issuing birth certificates with the parents listed under a "mother/father" section, instead of the current "parent/parent" section.

== Campaigns ==
Knowles did not face a Democratic challenger in a general election. In the 2020 election, Knowles was challenged by Taylor Picone, an officer of the U.S. Army National Guard. Knoweles defeated Picone significantly, receiving 72.5% of the vote.
