= Charles E. Quail =

American politician (1841–1910)

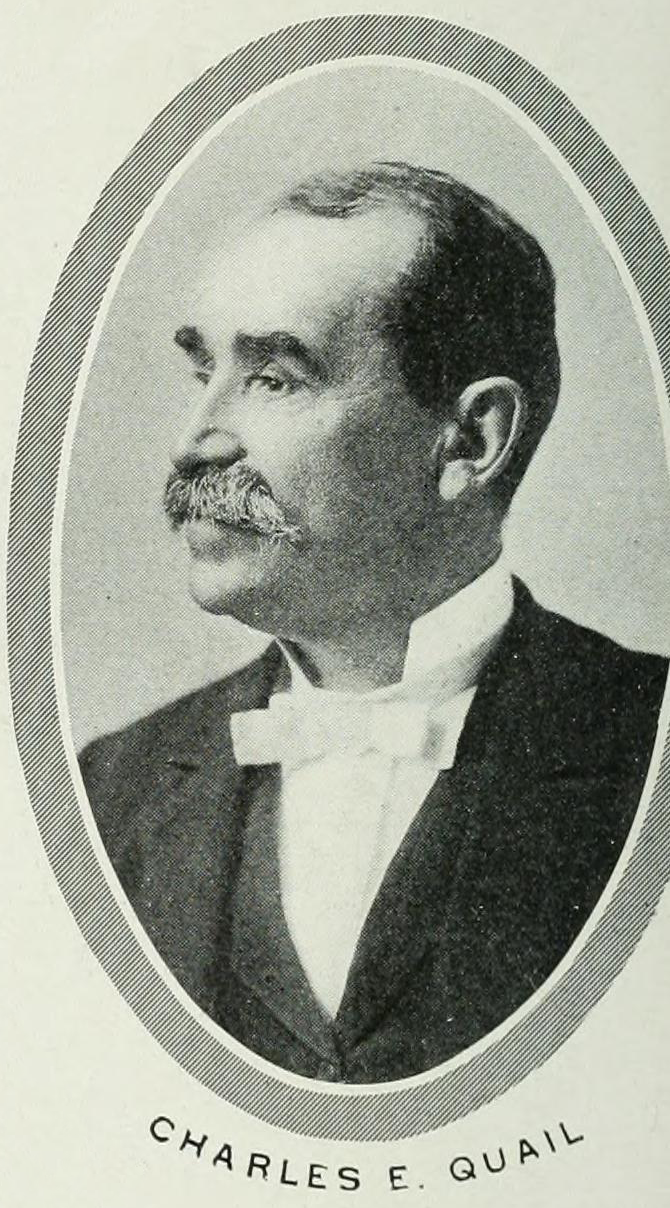

Member of the Pennsylvania Senate from the 29th district
- In office 1901–1908
- Preceded by: Samuel A. Losch
- Succeeded by: Charles A. Snyder

Personal details
- Born: Charles Edward Quail; October 9, 1841 Baltimore, Maryland, U.S.
- Died: December 21, 1910 Harrisburg, Pennsylvania, U.S.
- Resting place: Auburn Church of God Cemetery
- Party: Republican
- Spouse: Emma Catherine Weishampel (m. 1867)
- Children: 3
- Education: Mount Irvin College; University of Maryland School of Medicine
- Occupation: Politician; physician

Charles Edward Quail (October 9, 1841 – December 21, 1910) was an American politician and physician from Pennsylvania. He served in the Pennsylvania Senate from 1901 to 1906 and from 1907 to 1908.

== Early life ==
Charles Edward Quail was born on October 9, 1841, in Baltimore, Maryland, to Mary (née Ports) and Conrad Quail. His father immigrated from Germany. He attended common schools in Baltimore, Mount Irvin College in Manchester, Maryland, and the University of Maryland School of Medicine.

== Civil War ==
Quail enlisted on August 13, 1862, with Company D of the 8th Maryland Infantry Regiment. He attained the rank of first sergeant. He was present at the battles of Antietam, Clarksburg, Bolivar Heights, Gettysburg, Maryland Heights and Funkstown, and Wilderness. He was severely wounded at the Battle of Spotsylvania Court House. He took over company command at the Battle of Laurel Hill and was wounded during the battle. He also saw action at Hatcher's Run, the Siege of Petersburg and Appomattox Court House. He mustered out on May 31, 1865, with his regiment.

== Career ==
Following the war, he finished medical school and received a degree. He interned at the Baltimore Infirmary. In 1867, he moved to Auburn and opened a medical practice. He was engaged in the drug business and in 1873, he was elected deputy coroner of Schuylkill County. He served in the coroner's office until 1876. He was appointed by President Benjamin Harrison as federal Civil War pension examiner of Schuylkill County and served in that role from 1889 to 1901. He was school director of Auburn schools for 35 years and was also treasurer of Auburn.

Quail was elected as a Republican to the Pennsylvania Senate. He represented district 29, from 1901 to 1906 and from 1907 to 1908. He was a member of the appropriations, judicial appropriations, military affairs, public printing and public road and highways. He was chairman of the public health and sanitation committee.

Quail was president of Auburn Bolt and Nut Works. He was chair of the county Republican committee and member of the Gettysburg Battlefield Memorial Commission.

== Personal life ==
Quail married Emma Catherine Weishampel in 1867. They had three children, including Mrs. Frederick V. Filbert and Mrs. A. Y. Lescher.

In 1910, Quail traveled to Harrisburg to confer with Governor Edwin Sydney Stuart about reimbursing the railroads for providing transportation (for the old soldiers) to the dedication of the Gettysburg State Memorial. He died due to heart disease in the Capitol Building on December 21, 1910. He was buried in Auburn Church of God Cemetery.
