= John Reber =

American politician (1858–1931)

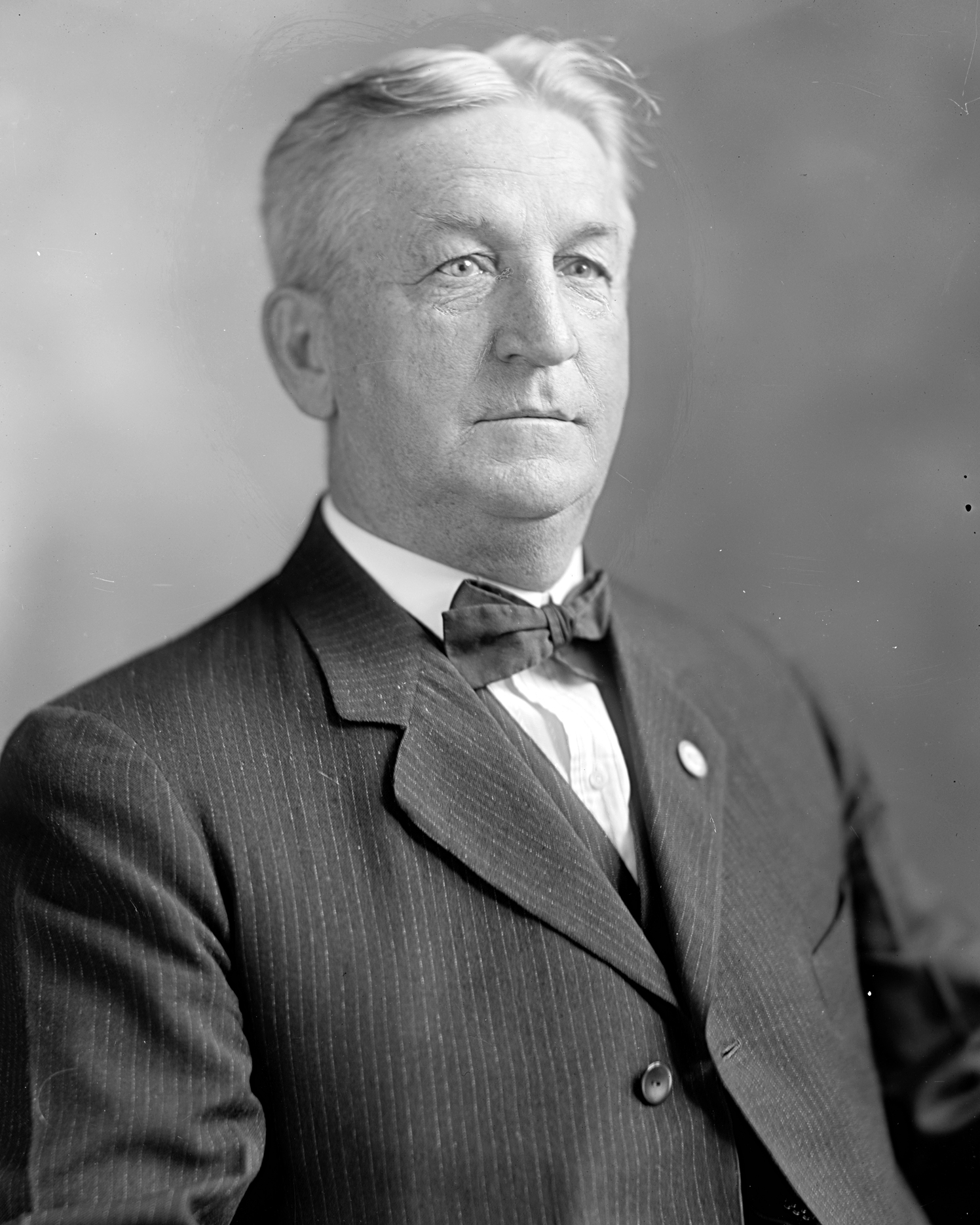
From the Harris & Ewing Collection, Library of Congress

John Reber (February 1, 1858 – September 26, 1931) was a Republican member of the U.S. House of Representatives from Pennsylvania.

John Reber was born in South Manheim Township, Pennsylvania. He graduated from the Eastman Business College in Poughkeepsie, New York, in 1875. He taught school for several years and was later employed as a bookkeeper. He served as deputy county treasurer of Schuylkill County, Pennsylvania from 1882 to 1884. He was engaged in the manufacture of hosiery in Pottsville, Pennsylvania, from 1885 to 1917 and also interested in banking.

Reber was elected as a Republican to the Sixty-sixth and Sixty-seventh Congresses. He served as Chairman of the United States House Committee on Mileage during the Sixty-seventh Congress. He was not a candidate for renomination in 1922.

Following his congressional career, he resumed banking activities in Pottsville, eventually serving as president of the Reber Investment Co. He died in Pottsville and is interred in the Charles Baber Cemetery.

== Sources ==
- United States Congress. "John Reber (id: R000102)". Biographical Directory of the United States Congress.
- The Political Graveyard

U.S. House of Representatives
Preceded by Robert D. Heaton	Member of the U.S. House of Representatives from Pennsylvania's 12th congressional district 1919–1923	Succeeded by John J. Casey
