= Frank M. Allen =

American politician

Member of the Pennsylvania House of Representatives from the 124th district
- In office January 7, 1969 – November 30, 1972
- Preceded by: District Created
- Succeeded by: William Klingaman

Member of the Pennsylvania House of Representatives from the Schuylkill County district
- In office January 2, 1967 – November 30, 1968

Personal details
- Born: February 15, 1923 Tamaqua, Pennsylvania, U.S.
- Died: January 9, 1999 (aged 75) Pottstown, Pennsylvania, U.S.
- Party: Republican

Frank M. Allen (February 15, 1923 – January 9, 1999) was a Republican member of the Pennsylvania House of Representatives.
