= Alfred B. Garner =

American politician (1873–1930)

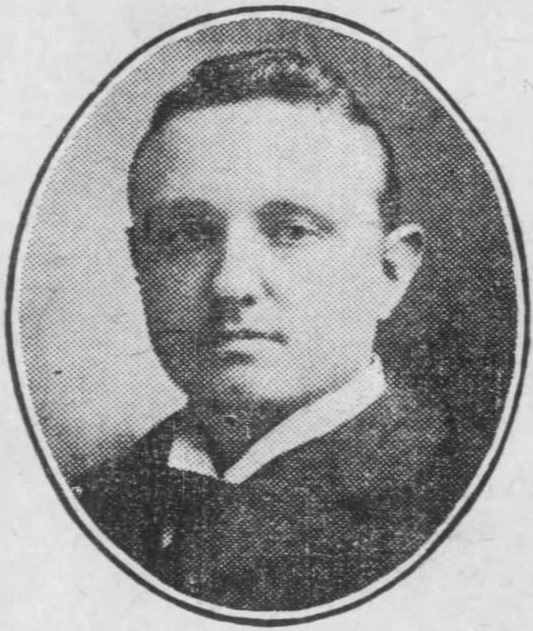
- From the April 19, 1908 edition of the Philadelphia Inquirer

Member of the U.S. House of Representatives from Pennsylvania's 12th district
- In office March 4, 1909 – March 3, 1911
- Preceded by: Charles N. Brumm
- Succeeded by: Robert Emmett Lee

Member of the Pennsylvania House of Representatives
- In office 1901–1907

Personal details
- Born: March 4, 1873 Ashland, Pennsylvania, US
- Died: July 30, 1930 (aged 57) Harrisburg, Pennsylvania, US
- Party: Republican

Alfred Buckwalter Garner (March 4, 1873 – July 30, 1930) was a Republican member of the U.S. House of Representatives from Pennsylvania.

== Biography ==
Alfred B. Garner was born in Ashland, Pennsylvania. He studied law, was admitted to the bar in 1897 and commenced practice in Ashland. He served as a member of the Pennsylvania State House of Representatives from 1901 to 1907.

Garner was elected as a Republican to the Sixty-first Congress. He was again a member of the State House of Representatives from 1915 to 1917. He resumed the practice of law in Ashland and served as the taxing officer of the auditor general's department in Harrisburg, Pennsylvania, until his death in Harrisburg. He was interred at Fountain Spring Cemetery in Fountain Springs, Pennsylvania.

== Sources ==
- United States Congress. "Alfred B. Garner (id: G000073)". Biographical Directory of the United States Congress.
- The Political Graveyard

U.S. House of Representatives
Preceded by Charles N. Brumm	Member of the U.S. House of Representatives from Pennsylvania's 12th congressional district 1909–1911	Succeeded by Robert E. Lee
