= Samuel S. Lewis =

American politician

17th Lieutenant Governor of Pennsylvania
- In office January 17, 1939 – January 19, 1943
- Governor: Arthur James
- Preceded by: Thomas Kennedy
- Succeeded by: John Bell

57th Treasurer of Pennsylvania
- In office January 20, 1925 – January 15, 1929
- Governor: Gifford Pinchot; John Stuchell Fisher
- Preceded by: Charles Snyder
- Succeeded by: Edward Martin

30th Auditor General of Pennsylvania
- In office January 18, 1921 – January 20, 1925
- Governor: William Cameron Sproul; Gifford Pinchot
- Preceded by: Charles Snyder
- Succeeded by: Edward Martin

Personal details
- Born: February 17, 1874 York, Pennsylvania, U.S.
- Died: January 15, 1959 (aged 84)
- Party: Republican
- Profession: Politician

Samuel S. Lewis (February 17, 1874 – January 15, 1959) was the 17th lieutenant governor of Pennsylvania from 1939 to 1943.

Lewis was born in York, Pennsylvania. He was elected Pennsylvania Auditor General in 1921 and then served as Pennsylvania Treasurer from 1925 through 1929. During the 1931-1935 administration of Gifford Pinchot, he was the Secretary of Highways and spearheaded the governor's ambitious rural transportation initiative. From 1952 through 1955, he was Governor John S. Fine's Secretary of Forests & Water. In 1954, he donated 35-acres of land in York County, Pennsylvania, which became the Samuel S. Lewis State Park.

Political offices
Preceded by Thomas Kennedy	Lieutenant Governor of Pennsylvania; 1939–1943	Succeeded by John Bell
Preceded by Charles Snyder	Treasurer of Pennsylvania; 1925 – 1929	Succeeded by Edward Martin
Preceded by Charles Snyder	Auditor General of Pennsylvania; 1921 – 1925	Succeeded by Edward Martin
Party political offices
Preceded by Charles Snyder	Republican nominee for Auditor General of Pennsylvania; 1920	Succeeded by Edward Martin
Preceded by Charles Snyder	Republican nominee for Treasurer of Pennsylvania; 1924	Succeeded by Edward Martin
Preceded by Harry Scott	Republican nominee for Lieutenant Governor of Pennsylvania; 1938	Succeeded by John Bell
