= Jamie Barton (politician) =

American politician

Member of the Pennsylvania House of Representatives from the 124th district
- Incumbent
- Assumed office January 3, 2023
- Preceded by: Jerry Knowles

Personal details
- Party: Republican
- Children: Jack Barton
- Education: Alvernia University
- Occupation: Energy Executive

Jamie Barton is an American politician. A Republican, he is a member of the Pennsylvania House of Representatives from the 124th district since 2023.

For the 2025-2026 Session, Barton sits on the following committees:

- Appropriations
- Energy
- Intergovernmental Affairs & Operations

Political offices
Pennsylvania House of Representatives
Preceded by Jerry Knowles	Member of the Pennsylvania House of Representatives from the 124th district 2023–present	Incumbent
