= Pennsylvania House of Representatives, District 124 =

American legislative district

Pennsylvania's 124th State House of Representatives district
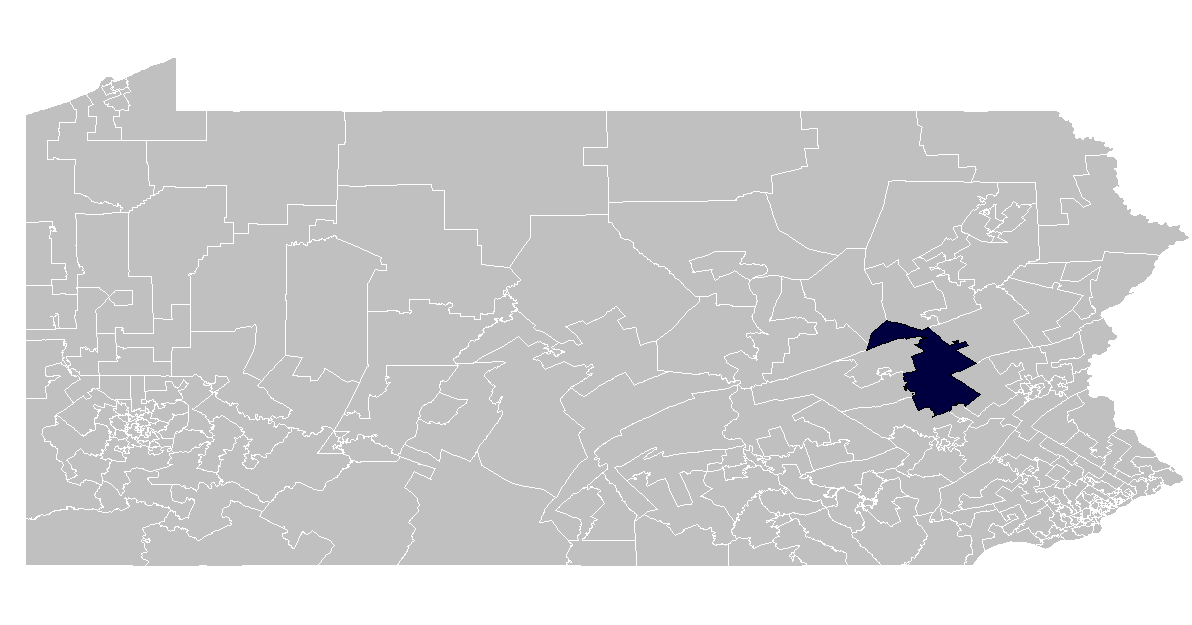
Representative
Jamie Barton; R–East Brunswick Township

The 124th Pennsylvania House of Representatives District is located in Berks and Schuylkill counties, and includes the following areas:

- Berks County
  - Albany Township
  - Greenwich Township
  - Maxatawny Township
  - Hamburg
  - Kutztown
  - Lenhartsville
  - Tilden Township
  - Upper Bern Township
  - Upper Tulpehocken Township
  - Windsor Township
- Schuylkill County
  - Auburn
  - Coaldale
  - Deer Lake
  - Delano Township
  - East Brunswick Township
  - Landingville
  - New Ringgold
  - Orwigsburg
  - Port Clinton
  - Rush Township
- Schuylkill County (continued)
  - Ryan Township
  - Schuylkill Township
  - South Manheim Township
  - Tamaqua
  - Walker Township
  - West Brunswick Township
  - West Penn Township

== Representatives ==
Representative	Party	Years	District home	Note
Prior to 1969, seats were apportioned by county.
Frank M. Allen	Republican	1969 – 1972		
William K. Klingaman, Sr.	Republican	1973 – 1990		
Dave Argall	Republican	1985 – 2009	Rush Township	Elected to the Pennsylvania State Senate
Jerry Knowles	Republican	2009 – 2023		Elected May 19, 2009 to fill vacancy
Jamie Barton	Republican	2023 – present		Incumbent
