= Yorkana, Pennsylvania =

Borough in Pennsylvania, US

- Borough
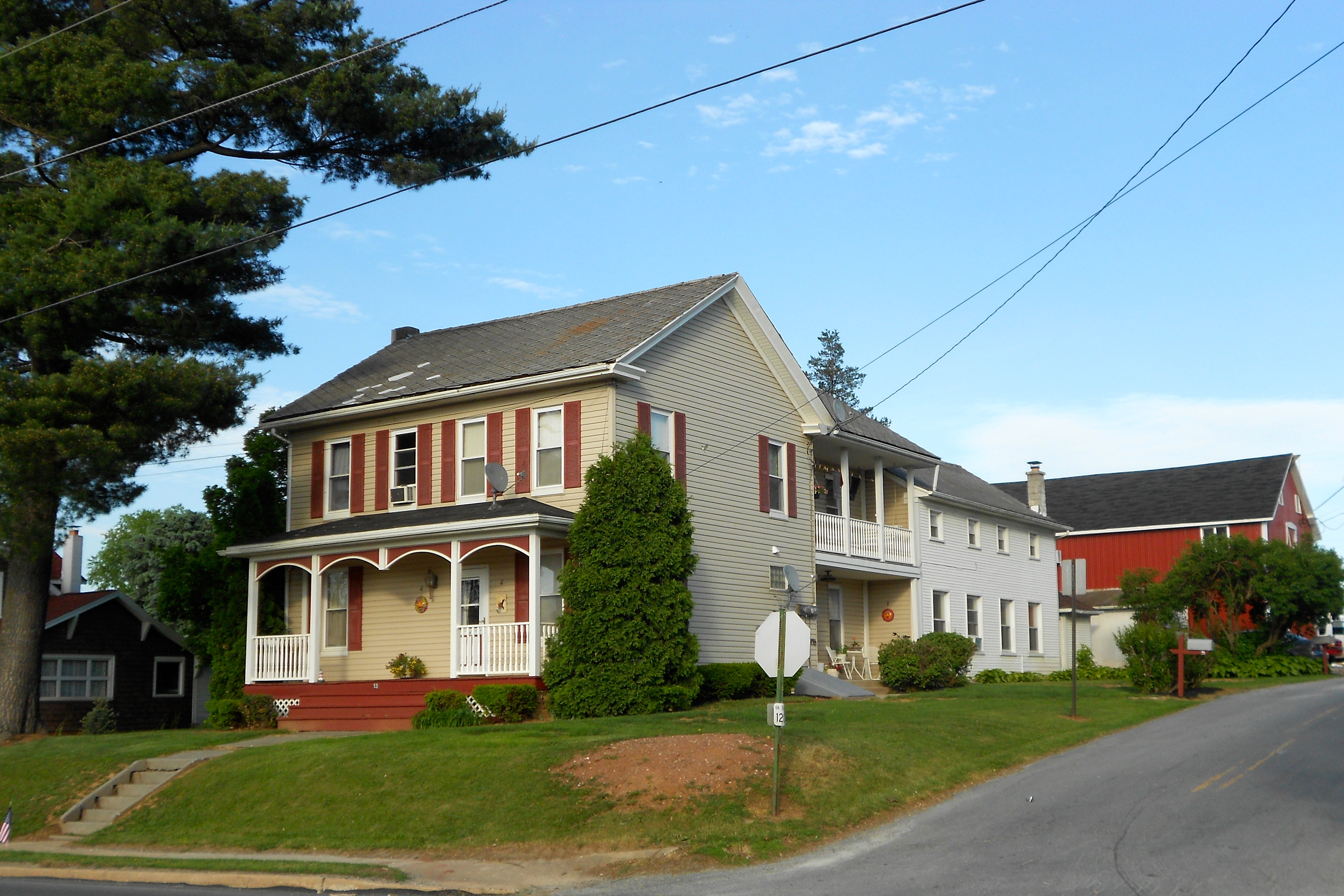

- Location in York County and the U.S. state of Pennsylvania.

- Location of Yorkana in Pennsylvania Yorkana (the United States)
- Coordinates: 39°58′33″N 76°35′05″W
- Country: United States
- State: Pennsylvania
- County: York
- Settled: 1800
- Incorporated: 1913

Government
  - Type: Borough Council

Area
  - Total: 0.17 sq mi (0.44 km^{2})
  - Land: 0.17 sq mi (0.44 km^{2})
  - Water: 0 sq mi (0.00 km^{2})
- Elevation: 633 ft (193 m)

Population (2020)
  - Total: 236 ▲
  - Estimate (2021): 235
  - Density: 1,335.8/sq mi (515.75/km^{2})
- Time zone: UTC-5 (Eastern (EST))
  - Summer (DST): UTC-4 (EDT)
- Zip code: 17402
- Area code: 717
- FIPS code: 42-87064
- GNIS feature ID: 1215772
- Website: https://yorkanaborough.com/

Yorkana is a borough in York County, Pennsylvania, United States. The population was 236 at the 2020 census. It is a linear town, spread along Mt. Pisgah Road, which is called Main Street in town. It is part of the York–Hanover metropolitan area. The borough includes several dozen houses, two churches, a local fire company, and a few businesses.

== Geography ==
According to the United States Census Bureau, the borough has a total area of 0.2 square miles (0.52 km^{2}), all land.

== Demographics ==
Historical population
Census	Pop.	Note	%±
1920	179		—
1930	219		22.3%
1940	242		10.5%
1950	229		−5.4%
1960	251		9.6%
1970	262		4.4%
1980	296		13.0%
1990	285		−3.7%
2000	239		−16.1%
2010	229		−4.2%
2020	239		4.4%
2021 (est.)	235	▼	−1.7%

As of the census of 2000, there were 239 people, 95 households, and 66 families residing in the borough. The population density was 1,306.9 inhabitants per square mile (504.6/km^{2}). There were 100 housing units at an average density of 546.8 per square mile (211.1/km^{2}). The racial makeup of the borough was 100.00% White. Hispanic or Latino of any race were 1.26% of the population.

There were 95 households, out of which 33.7% had children under the age of 18 living with them, 63.2% were married couples living together, 5.3% had a female householder with no husband present, and 29.5% were non-families. 27.4% of all households were made up of individuals, and 10.5% had someone living alone who was 65 years of age or older. The average household size was 2.52 and the average family size was 3.01.

In the borough, the population was spread out, with 25.5% under the age of 18, 7.9% from 18 to 24, 30.5% from 25 to 44, 25.5% from 45 to 64, and 10.5% who were 65 years of age or older. The median age was 37 years. For every 100 females, there were 100.8 males. For every 100 females age 18 and over, there were 95.6 males.

The median income for a household in the borough was $45,278, and the median income for a family was $43,125. Males had a median income of $38,333 versus $19,688 for females. The per capita income for the borough was $16,599. About 2.9% of families and 2.1% of the population were below the poverty line, including none of those under the age of eighteen or sixty five or over.

== Education ==
Yorkana is served by the Eastern York School District.

== Gallery ==
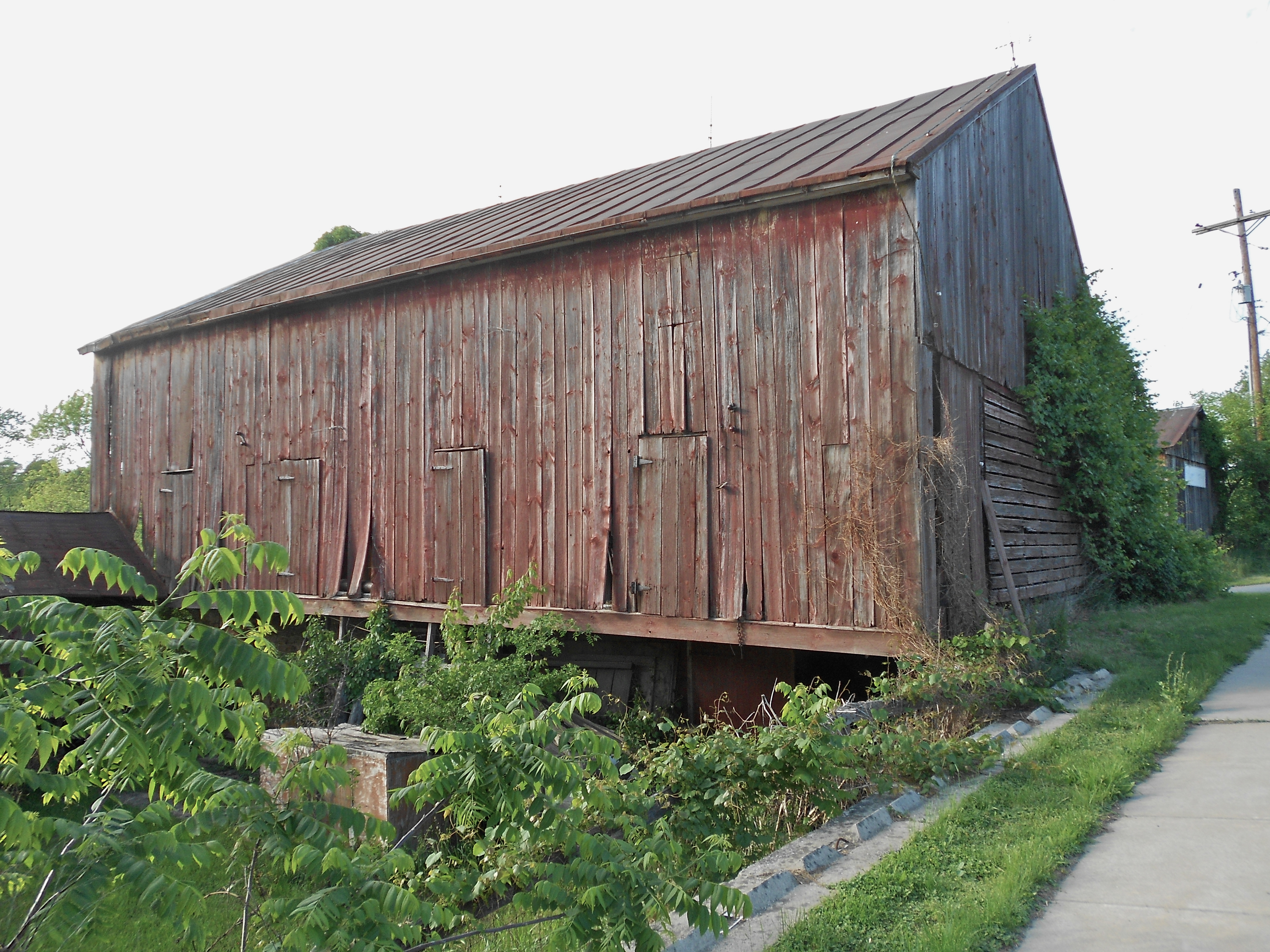
Barn on Main St.

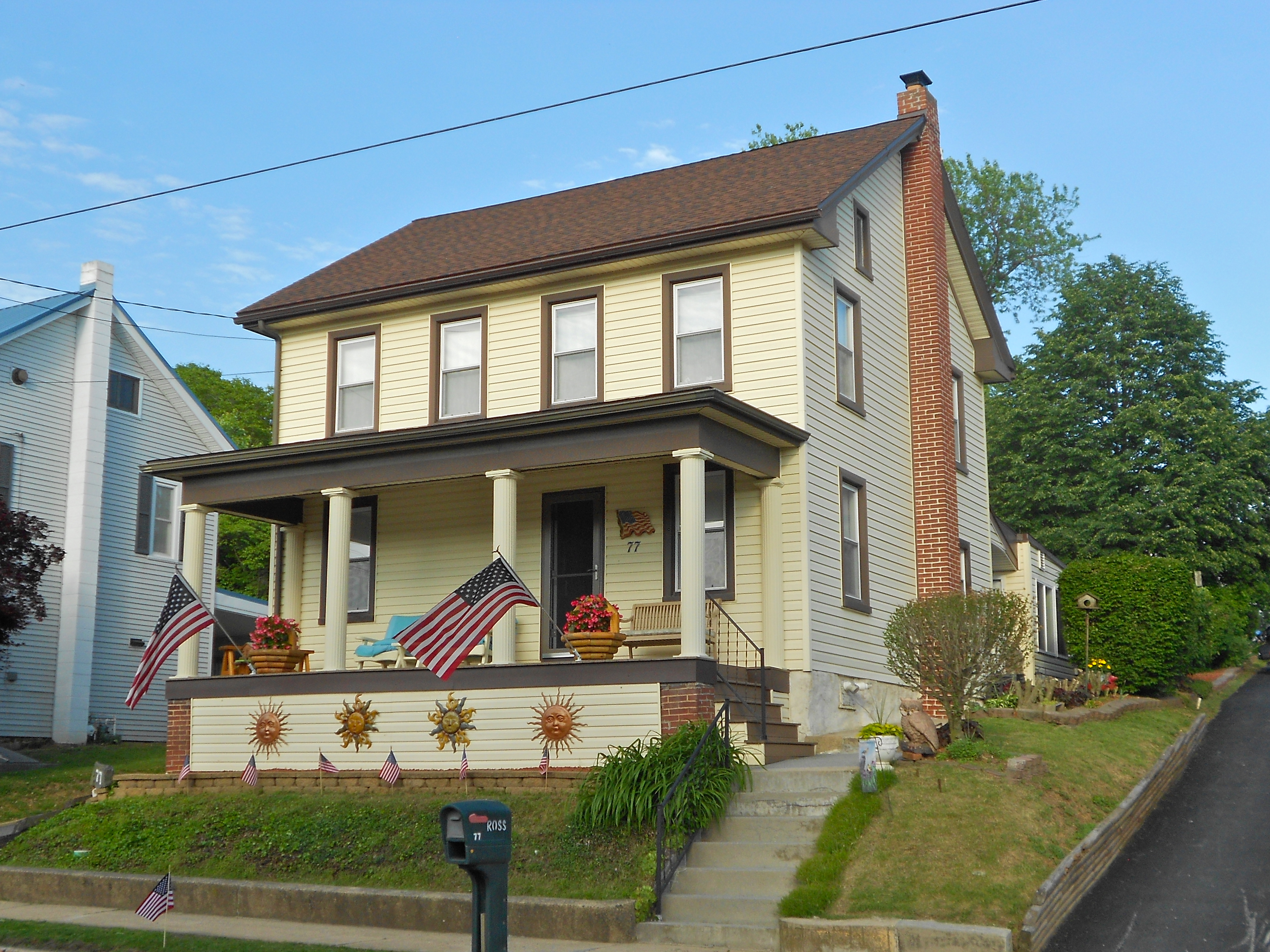

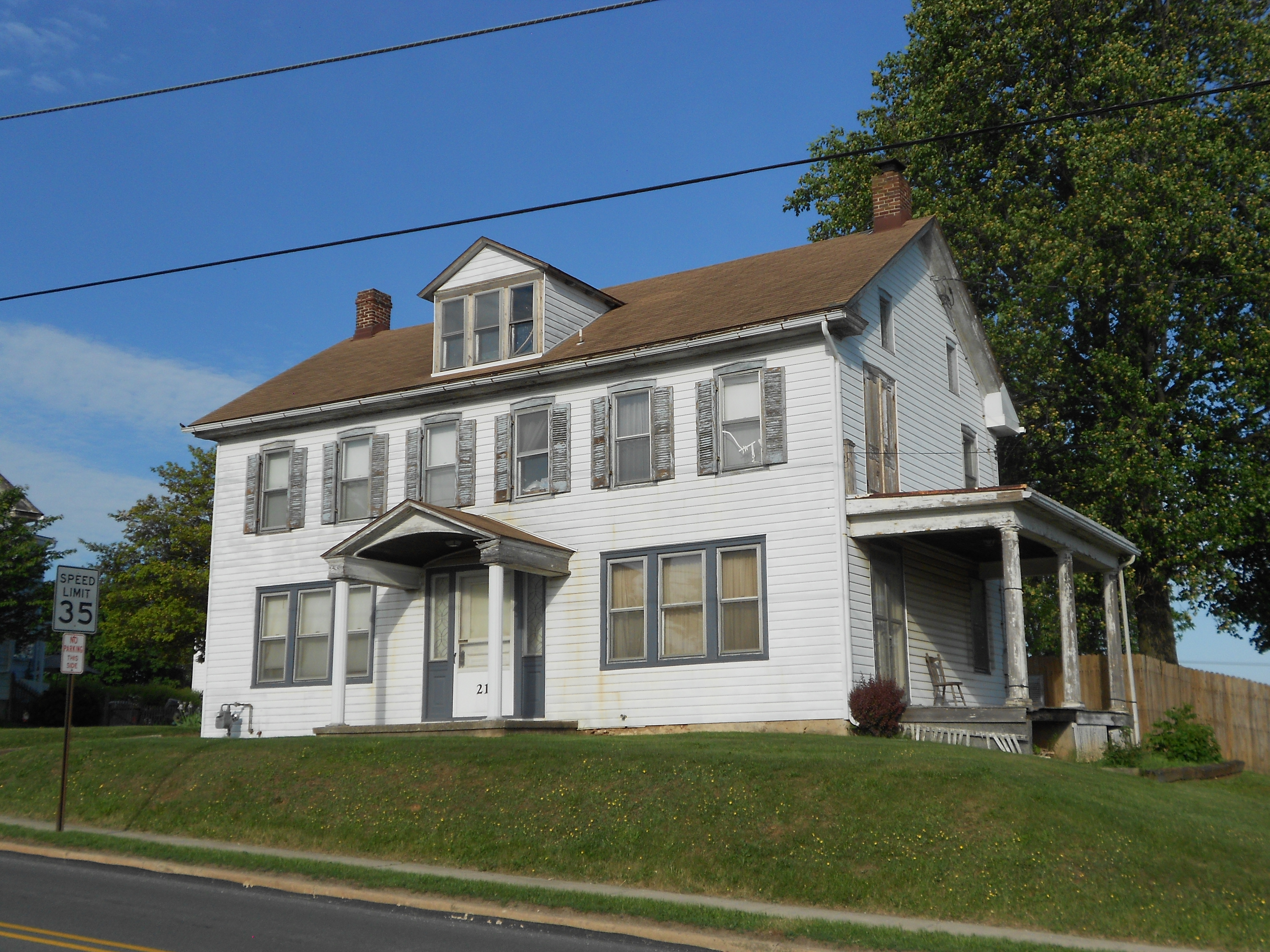

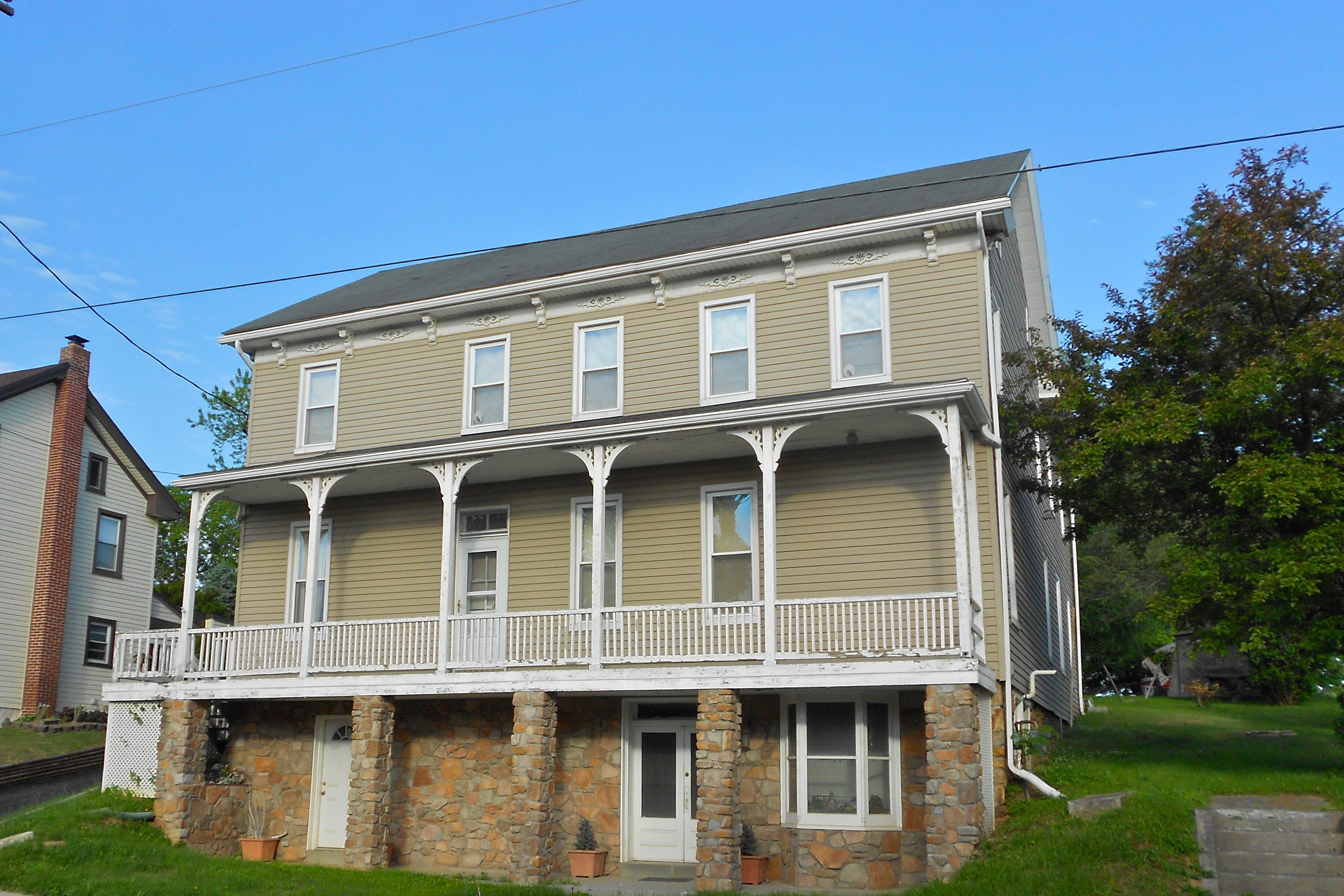

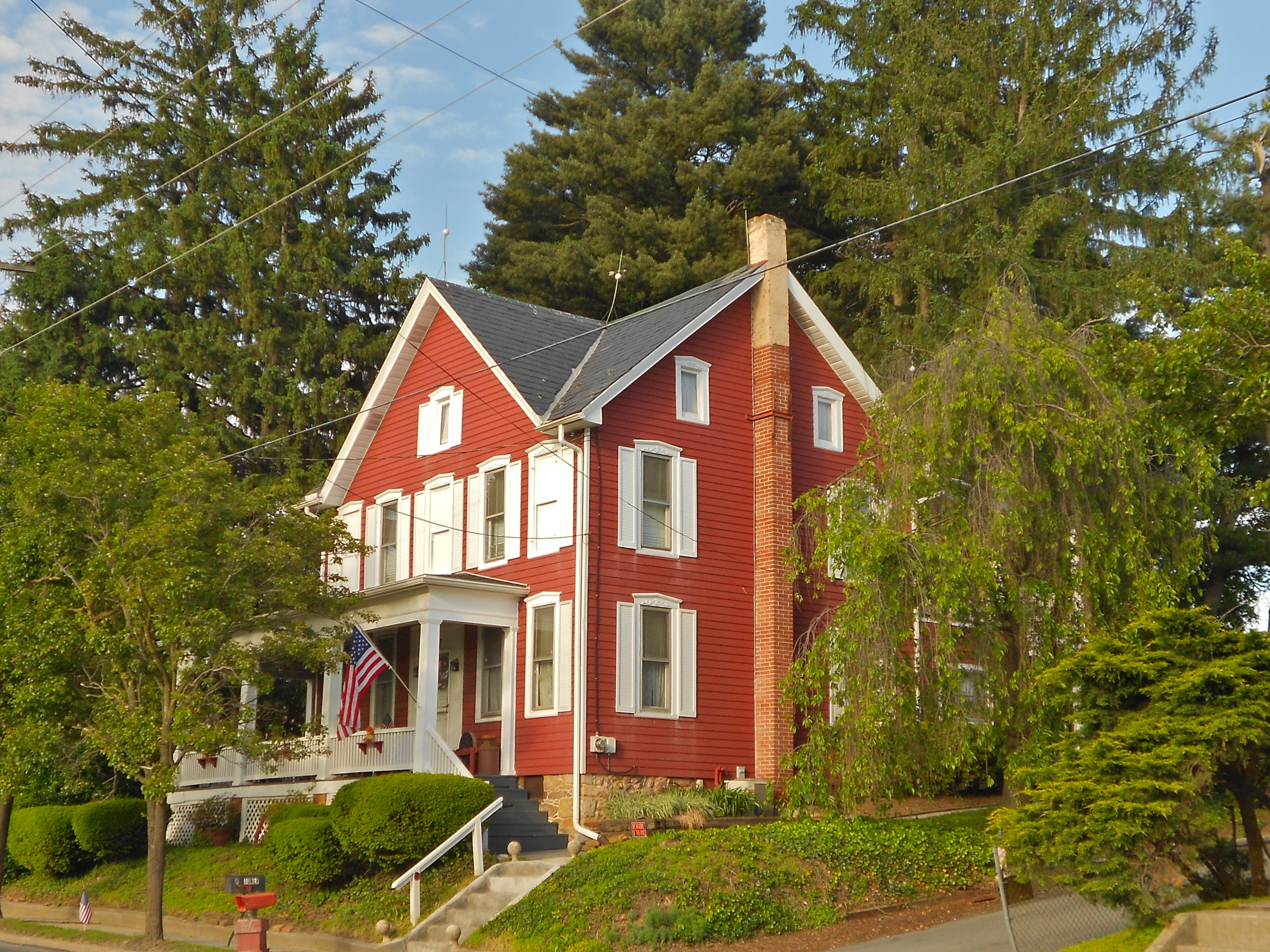

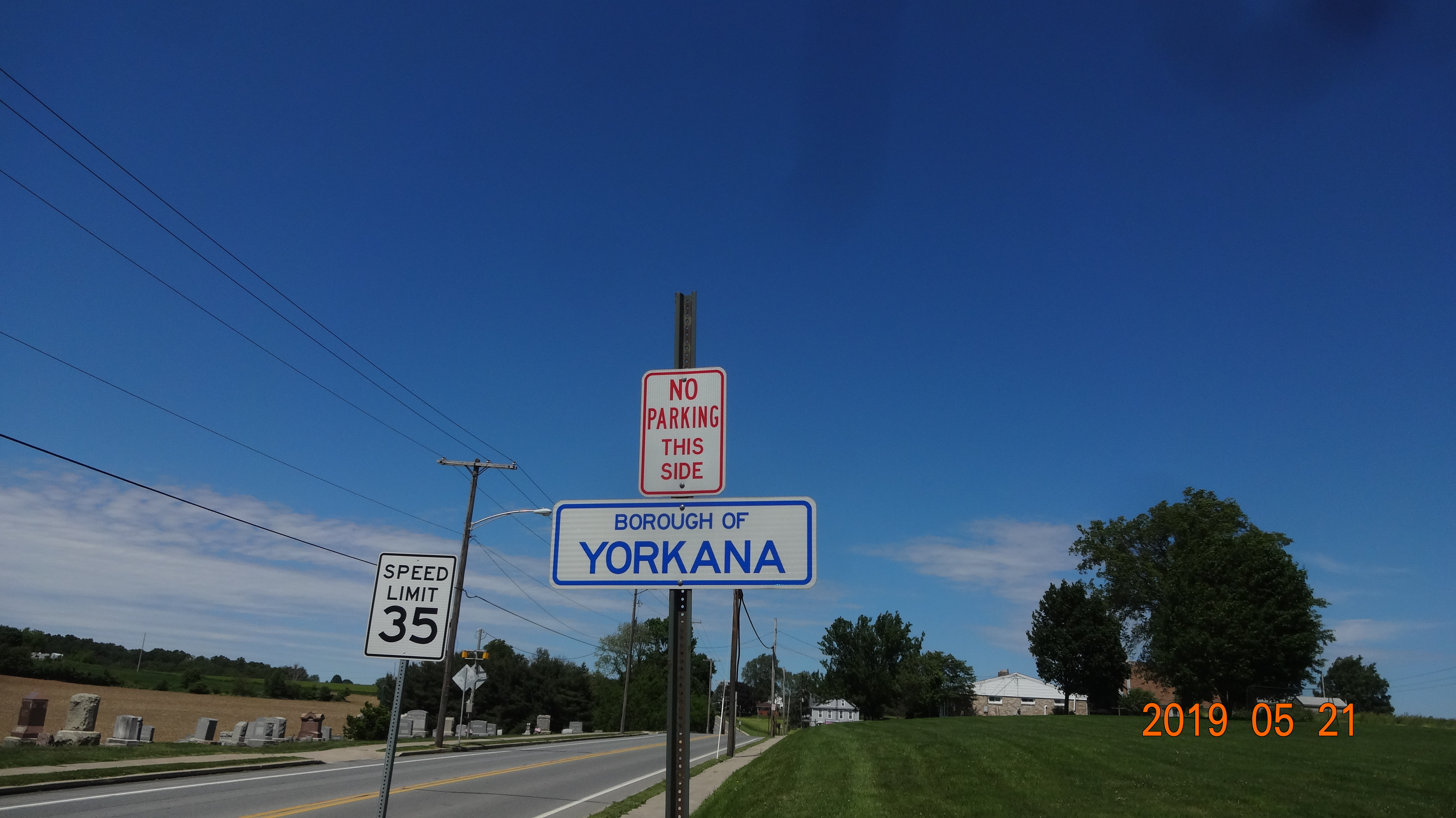
Yorkana Borough sign
