= Dave Argall =

American politician

David G. Argall
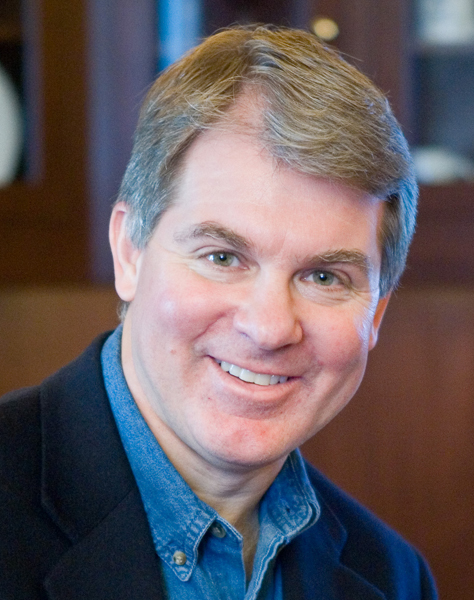

Member of the Pennsylvania Senate from the 29th district
- Incumbent
- Assumed office March 17, 2009
- Preceded by: James J. Rhoades

Republican Whip of the Pennsylvania House of Representatives
- In office January 4, 2005 – November 30, 2008
- Preceded by: Brett Feese
- Succeeded by: Mike Turzai

Member of the Pennsylvania House of Representatives from the 124th district
- In office January 1, 1985 – March 17, 2009
- Preceded by: William Klingaman Sr.
- Succeeded by: Jerry Knowles

Personal details
- Born: November 21, 1958 (age 67) West Chester, Pennsylvania
- Party: Republican
- Spouse: Beth Argall
- Children: AJ and Elise
- Education: Lycoming College; Penn State Harrisburg
- Occupation: Legislator and Adjunct Professor
- Website: www.senatorargall.com

David G. Argall (born November 21, 1958) is an American politician who is a member of the Pennsylvania State Senate, elected in a special election on March 3, 2009 following the death of fellow Republican James J. Rhoades. He was elected a member of the Pennsylvania House of Representatives in 1984 and served as Republican Whip from 2004 to 2008. Argall lost the 17th Congressional District election in 2010 after challenging incumbent Congressman Tim Holden.

== Early life and education ==
Argall earned a bachelor's degree in political science and international studies from Lycoming College and a master's degree in American studies at Penn State Harrisburg. In May 2006, he earned his Ph.D. in public administration from Penn State. Argall is a part-time instructor who has taught at Lycoming College and Penn State Schuylkill.

== Political career ==
Argall was Chairman of the House Appropriations Committee, a position that led him to being named to the 2003 "The Pennsylvania Report Power 75" list of influential figures in Pennsylvania politics. He was elected to serve as the Republican Whip in 2004 and again in 2006.

Argall did not run for re-election to the post of Minority Whip in order to run for the State Senate seat from the 29th district which was vacated by the death and posthumous re-election of James J. Rhoades. He was elected to the seat over his Democratic opponent, Schuylkill County Clerk of Courts Steven Lukach, by a margin of 62% to 38%.

=== Committee Assignments ===
As of July 2025, Argall serves as the Majority Policy Committee Chairman.

For the 2025-2026 Session Argall sits on the following committees in the Senate:

- Institutional Sustainability & Innovation (Vice Chair)
- Agriculture & Rural Affairs
- Education
- Rules & Executive Nominations
- State Government
- Urban Affairs & Housing

=== 2010 U.S. Congressional campaign ===
On January 11, 2010, Argall announced his intention to challenge incumbent Democratic Congressman Tim Holden in the November elections. Argall's state senate district covered much of the eastern portion of the congressional district, including Holden's hometown of St. Clair. On November 2, 2010, Argall's 95,000 votes weren't enough as he lost for the first time in his political career, falling to Holden's 118,486 votes. He did not have to give up his state senate seat to run for Congress; Pennsylvania state senators serve staggered four-year terms, and Argall was not up for reelection until 2012.

=== 2025 Civics Bee controversy ===
On April 16, 2025, Argall served as a volunteer judge of the National Civics Bee competition in Schuylkill County. A sixth grade student presented to the judges on the topic of book banning. When it was Argall's turn to talk to the student, he asked if she thought pornographic magazines should be allowed in kindergarten. When the student asked for clarification, Argall responded "pictures of naked people." Argall's part in the exchange was the subject of significant criticism on social media. Argall subsequently apologized for "citing an example that was itself not appropriate for this age group."

Pennsylvania State Senate
Preceded by James J. Rhoades	Member of the Pennsylvania Senate for the 29th District; 2009–present	Succeeded by Incumbent
Pennsylvania House of Representatives
Preceded by William K. Klingaman Sr.	Member of the Pennsylvania House of Representatives for the 124th District; 1985–2009	Succeeded by Jerry Knowles
Party political offices
Preceded by Samuel H. Smith	Republican Whip of the Pennsylvania House of Representatives; 2004–2008	Succeeded by Mike Turzai
