= Joseph Gurzenda =

American politician

Joseph E. Gurzenda

Member of the Pennsylvania Senate from the 29th district
- In office 1977–1980
- Preceded by: Frederick H. Hobbs
- Succeeded by: James J. Rhoades

Personal details
- Born: March 24, 1937 Tresckow, Pennsylvania
- Died: September 22, 2014 (aged 77) McAdoo, Pennsylvania
- Party: Democratic

Joseph E. Gurzenda (March 24, 1937 – September 22, 2014) was a member of the Pennsylvania State Senate, serving from 1977 to 1980.

== Formative years and family ==
Born in Tresckow, Carbon County, Pennsylvania on March 24, 1937, Gurzenda was a son of Joseph and Margaret (Bodnar) Gurzenda. He attended the University of Delaware and King's College.

He was married to Monica Mulik.

== Career ==
Gurzenda won his Pennsylvania State Senate seat in 1976 in an upset victory over Republican incumbent Fred Hobbs, becoming only the second Democratic Party member to win this seat since 1900.

After his electoral defeat in 1980, he became a business entrepreneur, owning and operating several small retail businesses. He also worked in strip mine development. He was later appointed by then Governor Edward G. Rendell in 2004, to the State Tax Equalization Board.

== Death ==
Gurzenda died in McAdoo, Pennsylvania in 2014.
