= Robert Emmett Lee =

American politician

Robert E. Lee
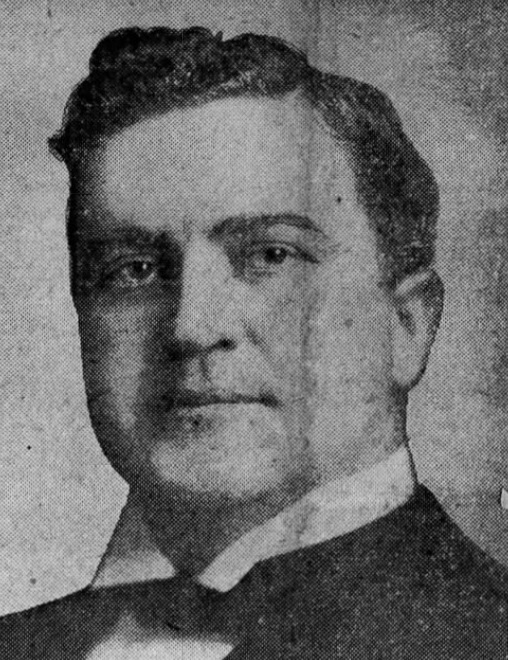
- West Schuylkill Press (Tremont, PA), November 25, 1916

Member of the U.S. House of Representatives from Pennsylvania's 12th district
- In office March 4, 1911 – March 3, 1915
- Preceded by: Alfred B. Garner
- Succeeded by: Robert D. Heaton

Personal details
- Born: October 12, 1868 Pottsville, Pennsylvania
- Died: November 19, 1916 (aged 48) Pottsville, Pennsylvania
- Party: Democratic

Robert Emmett Lee (October 12, 1868 – November 19, 1916) was a Democratic member of the U.S. House of Representatives from Pennsylvania.

== Biography ==
Robert E. Lee was born in Pottsville, Pennsylvania. He was apprenticed to the blacksmith's trade, engaged in mercantile pursuits in Pottsville. He served as Schuylkill County treasurer in 1905, and was an unsuccessful candidate for election in 1908.

Lee was elected as a Democrat to the Sixty-second and Sixty-third Congresses. He served as Chairman of the United States House Committee on Mileage during the Sixty-second Congress. He was an unsuccessful candidate for reelection in 1914. He resumed his former business activities in Pottsville. He was an unsuccessful candidate for election in 1916.

He died in Pottsville, aged 48, and is buried in St. Patrick's Cemetery.

== Sources ==
- United States Congress. "Robert Emmett Lee (id: L000202)". Biographical Directory of the United States Congress.
- The Political Graveyard

U.S. House of Representatives
Preceded by Alfred B. Garner	Member of the U.S. House of Representatives from Pennsylvania's 12th congressional district 1911–1915	Succeeded by Robert D. Heaton
