= William Klingaman =

American politician

William K. Klingaman, Sr.

Member of the Pennsylvania House of Representatives from the 124th district
- In office 1973–1985
- Preceded by: Frank M. Allen
- Succeeded by: Dave Argall

Personal details
- Born: December 14, 1916 Tamaqua, Pennsylvania, U.S.
- Died: August 13, 1991 (aged 74) Philadelphia, Pennsylvania, U.S.
- Party: Republican

William K. Klingaman, Sr. (December 14, 1916 – August 13, 1991) was a former Republican member of the Pennsylvania House of Representatives.
