= Paul L. Wagner =

Pennsylvania state politician

Member of the Pennsylvania Senate from the 29th district
- In office 1944–1964
- Preceded by: G. Harold Watkins
- Succeeded by: Frederick H. Hobbs

Personal details
- Born: September 19, 1897 Tamaqua, Pennsylvania, U.S.
- Died: September 10, 1991 (aged 93) Coaldale, Pennsylvania, U.S.
- Party: Republican

Paul L. Wagner (September 19, 1897 – September 10, 1991) was an American politician from Pennsylvania.

== Early life and education ==
Wagner born in Tamaqua, Pennsylvania, on September 19, 1897, the son of Samuel Paul Wagner (1872–1944) and Emma Elizabeth Fox (1874–1939). His father was a traveling salesman who died several days after Wagner's election to the Pennsylvania State Senate.

Wagner graduated from Tamaqua High School in 1915. He then graduated from the Alexander Hamilton Institute.

== Career ==
He worked in various businesses including as district sales manager for Bastian Brothers Company and Jostens, following in his father’s footsteps as a salesman. He also was the city editor and a reporter in the sports department for the Tamaqua Evening Courier newspaper.

=== Political career ===
Wagner was first elected as a Republican to the Pennsylvania House of Representatives for Schuylkill County for the 1939 term and served one term. He served on the Committee to Investigate Manner of Conducting Civil Service Examinations (1939–1940). He was unsuccessful in his campaign for re-election to the Pennsylvania State House in 1940. However, from 1941 to 1942, he continued to work in the House as a Speaker’s appointee to the Committee to Investigate Unemployment Compensation Civil Service.

He was elected to the Pennsylvania State House for the 1943 term. He was then elected to the Pennsylvania State Senate, where he served for twenty years until 1964. While in the Pennsylvania State Senate, he served on the following committees and commissions:

- Commission to Study School System (1945–1946)
- Joint Legislative Sub-Committee on Municipal Authorities (1945–1946)
- Joint Legislative Committee on Retirement Systems and Laws (1947–1948)
- Joint Legislative Committee on Education (1947–1948)
- Joint Legislative Committee on Post-High School Education (1947–1948)
- Joint Legislative Committee on Juvenile Delinquency and Child Welfare (1947–1948)
- Post-High School Commission (1947–1948)
- Joint State Government Commission (1949–1956)
- Advisory Council on Library Development (1961–1964)
- Pennsylvania Higher Education Assistance Agency (1963–1964). Wagner was the first chairman of this agency and helped to consolidate the commonwealth's school districts.

On November 4, 1962, Wagner faced a close re-election against Democratic challenger Albert I. Nagle. Returns initially indicated that Nagle led by less than 600 votes. Attention then focused on 2,800 absentee ballots. When the Board of Elections met to count these, both candidates immediately entered challenges to a substantial number of the ballots before the envelopes containing those ballots were opened. After a hearing, the Board filed its decision overruling the challenges in some instances and sustaining them in others. Both candidates then appealed to the Court of Common Pleas of Schuylkill County questioning the legality of the Board's decision. The court ruled to sustain the decision of the Board in part and reversing it in part. Wagner then filed an appeal. By the time the Pennsylvania Supreme Court decided to affirm the results, the next election cycle took place in November 1966, and neither Wagner nor Nagle were able to claim the seat.

After his career in Pennsylvania state politics, Wagner was appointed president of the First National Bank in Tamaqua, Pennsylvania, where he was responsible for negotiating a merger with Miners National Bank of Pottsville, a predecessor of Santander Bank. He then later served as a bank director emeritus.

== Personal life ==
He was married to Marguerite Ott (1901–1992).

== Death ==
On September 10, 1991, Wagner died in Coaldale, Pennsylvania, at age 93.
