= Eastern York School District =

School district in Pennsylvania

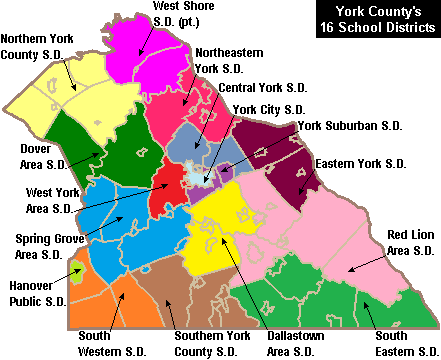

Address
- Wrightsville School Campus Wrightsville, Pennsylvania, 17368; United States
- Coordinates: 39.99237°N 76.57058°W

District information
- Type: Public school district

Students and staff
- District mascot: Golden Knights
- Colors: Blue & Gold

Other information
- Website: www.easternyork.com

The Eastern York School District is a midsized, suburban, public school district. It covers approximately 54 square miles (140 km^{2}) of east, central York County in the South Central region of Pennsylvania. The District overlooks the Susquehanna River and is made up of six municipalities which include East Prospect Borough, Hallam Borough, Hellam Township, Lower Windsor Township, Yorkana Borough, and Wrightsville Borough. According to 2000 federal census data, it served a resident population of 17,768. The US Census bureau reported that the population grew to 19,565 people in 2010.

Eastern York School District operates 5 schools: Eastern York High School (9–12), Eastern York Middle School (6–8), Canadochly Elementary School (K–5), Kreutz Creek Elementary School (K–5) and Wrightsville Elementary School (K–5).

== Extracurriculars ==
Eastern York School District offers a wide variety of clubs, activities and an extensive sports program.

=== Sports ===
In February 2013, the Eastern York School Board approved (6–3) a plan to renovate the stadium field and track, including a poly-resin track and a synthetic turf field at an estimated cost of nearly $800,000. A school board member suggested that only "13 percent of the students will use the new field."

The District funds:

Boys

- Baseball – AAA
- Basketball – AAA
- Cross Country – AAA
- Football – AAA
- Golf – AAA
- Soccer – AA
- Track and Field – AAA
- Volleyball – AA
- Wrestling – AAA

Girls

- Basketball – AAA
- Cross Country – AAA
- Golf – AA
- Field Hockey – AA
- Soccer (Fall) – AA
- Softball – AAA
- Track and Field – AAA
- Volleyball – AA

Middle School Sports

Boys

- Basketball
- Cross Country
- Football
- Track and Field
- Wrestling

Girls

- Basketball
- Cross Country
- Field Hockey
- Track and Field
- Volleyball

According to PIAA directory July 2012

== Intermediate Unit ==
Lincoln Intermediate Unit (IU#12) region includes: Adams County, Franklin County and York County. The agency provides Eastern York Schools, district home schooled students and area private schools many services, including: Special education services, combined purchasing, and instructional technology services. It runs Summer Academy which offers both art and academic strands designed to meet the individual needs of gifted, talented and high achieving students. Additional services include: Curriculum Mapping, Professional Development for school employees, Adult Education, Nonpublic School Services, Business Services, Migrant & ESL (English as a Second Language), Instructional Services, Special Education, Management Services, and Technology Services. It also provides a GED program to adults who want to earn a high school diploma and literacy programs. The Lincoln Intermediate Unit is governed by a 13-member board of directors, each a member of a local school board from the 25 school districts. Board members are elected by school directors of all 25 school districts for three-year terms that begin July 1. There are 29 intermediate units in Pennsylvania. They are funded by school districts, state and federal program specific funding and grants. IUs do not have the power to tax.

== Notable alumni ==
- Jon Witman, Pittsburgh Steelers/Penn State Fullback
