= Robert D. Heaton =

American politician (1873–1933)

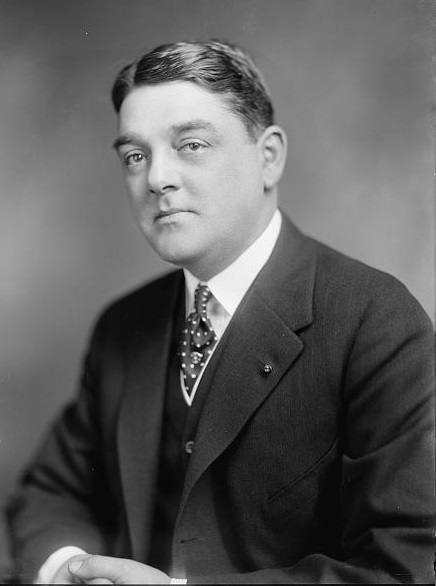
- Heaton, 1905–1933

Member of the U.S. House of Representatives from Pennsylvania's 12th district
- In office March 4, 1915 – March 3, 1919
- Preceded by: Robert Emmett Lee
- Succeeded by: John Reber

Member of the Pennsylvania Senate
- In office 1919–1932
- Preceded by: Charles A. Snyder
- Succeeded by: Charles W. Staudenmeier

Personal details
- Born: Robert Douglas Heston; July 1, 1873 Raven Run, Pennsylvania, U.S.
- Died: June 11, 1933 (aged 59) Ashland, Pennsylvania, U.S.
- Resting place: Jim Thorpe, Pennsylvania
- Party: Republican

Robert Douglas Heaton (July 1, 1873 – June 11, 1933) was 20th-century American businessman and politician who served two terms as a Republican member of the U.S. House of Representatives from Pennsylvania from 1915 to 1919.

== Biography ==
Robert D. Heaton was born in Raven Run, Pennsylvania. He moved to Ashland, Pennsylvania, with his parents in 1886. He attended the Canandaigua Academy in Canandaigua, New York, the New York Military Academy at Cornwall, New York, and the University of Pennsylvania at Philadelphia. He is identified with many business enterprises of the state and county.

=== Congress ===
Heaton was an unsuccessful candidate for election in 1910, and was elected as a Republican to the Sixty-fourth and Sixty-fifth Congresses. He did not seek renomination in 1918, having become a candidate for the Pennsylvania State Senate.

=== Later activities ===
He was a member of the State Senate from 1919 to 1932. He resumed his former business activities, and served as a member of the board of trustees of the Ashland State Hospital.

=== Death and burial ===
He died in Ashland, Pennsylvania, aged 59, and is interred in the family cemetery in Jim Thorpe, Pennsylvania.

== Sources ==
- United States Congress. "Robert D. Heaton (id: H000433)". Biographical Directory of the United States Congress.
- The Political Graveyard

U.S. House of Representatives
Preceded by Robert E. Lee	Member of the U.S. House of Representatives from Pennsylvania's 12th congressional district 1915–1919	Succeeded by John Reber
