= McConkey =

McConkey (Irish: Mac Donnachaidh) is an Irish surname. The surname arose in Scotland from the Irish 'Dál Riata' people. Notable people with the surname include:

- Bob McConkey (1895–1961), Irish hurler
- Charlie McConkey (born 1955), American politician
- Edwin H. McConkey, (born 1931) American biologist
- Jim McConkey (born 1926) Canadian skier and entrepreneur
- Ladd McConkey, (born 2001) American college football player/Professional Football player for the LA Chargers of the NFL
- Mark McConkey, American politician
- Paul McConkey, British slalom canoeist
- Phil McConkey, (born 1957) American former football player
- Samuel McConkey, Irish doctor
- Shane McConkey, (1969–2009) Canadian professional skier
- Thomas David McConkey, (1815–1890) Irish-born Canadian businessman and political figure
- Tony McConkey, (born 1963) American politician

McConkey may also refer to:

- McConkey (film), 2013 documentary film
- McConkey's Ferry, part of George Washington's crossing of the Delaware River
