= Wrightsville, Pennsylvania =

Borough in Pennsylvania, US

- Borough
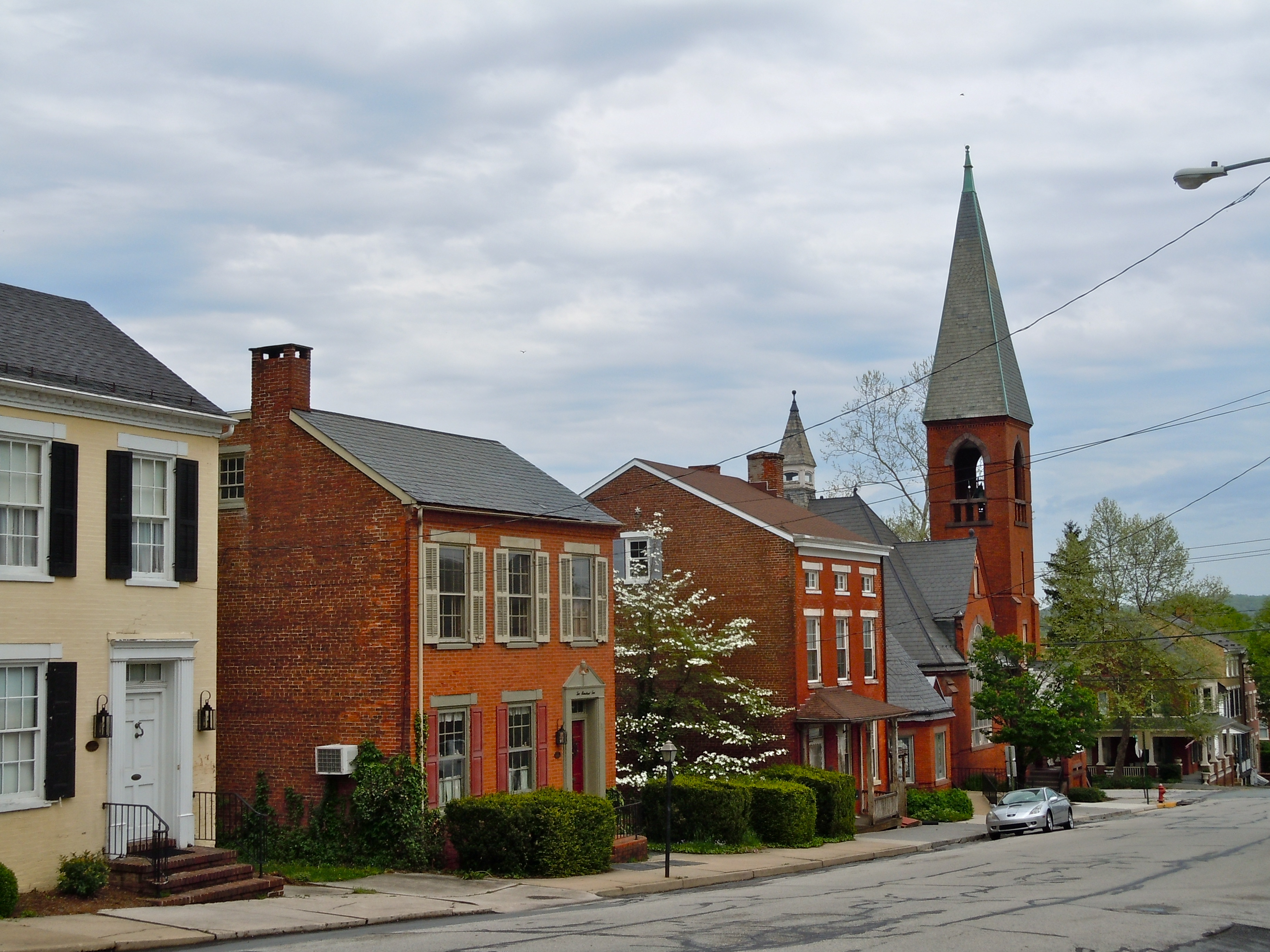

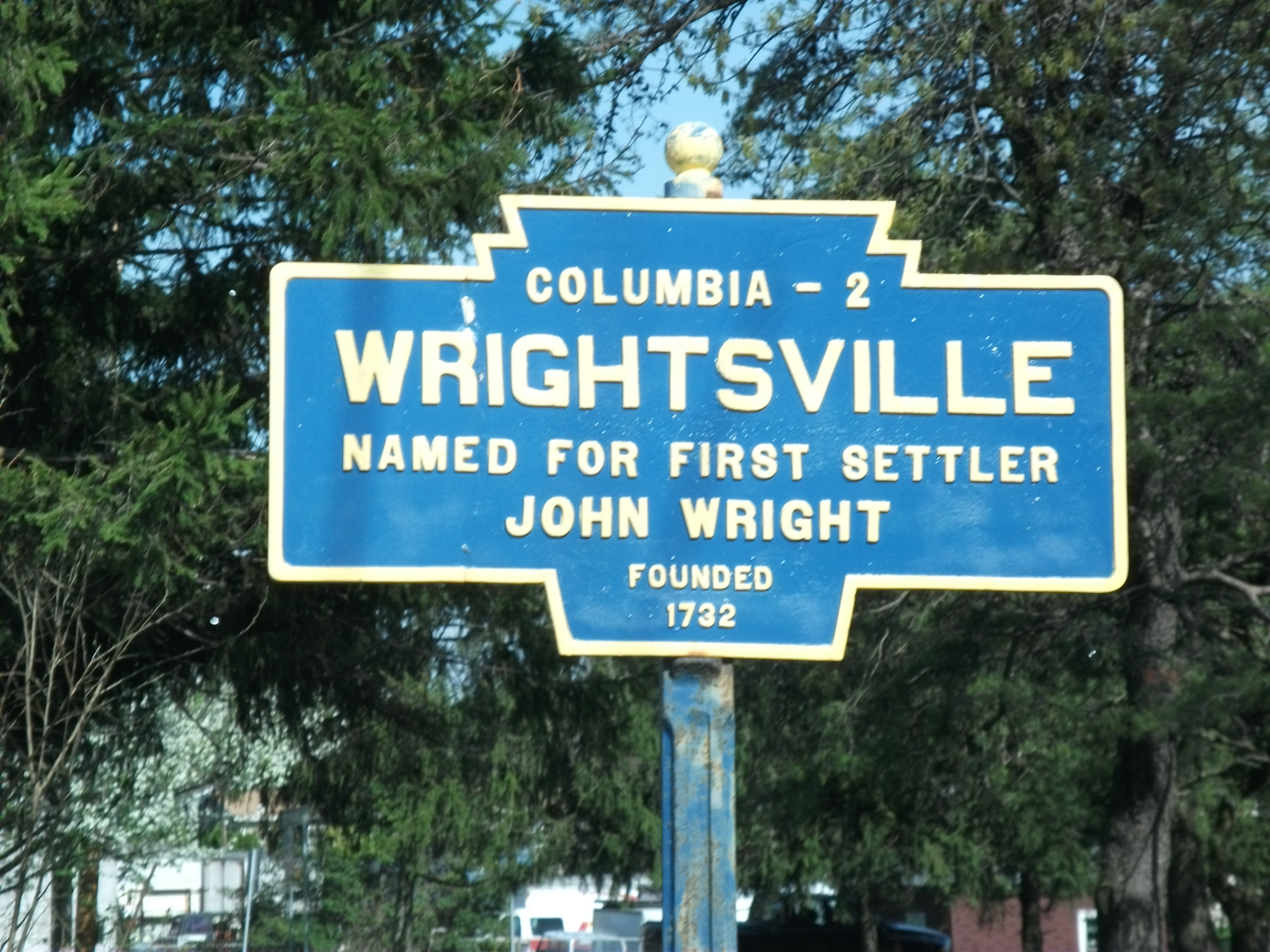
- Keystone Marker

- Location in York County and the U.S. state of Pennsylvania.

- Location of Wrightsville in Pennsylvania Wrightsville (the United States)
- Coordinates: 40°01′28″N 76°31′52″W
- Country: United States
- State: Pennsylvania
- County: York
- Settled: 1811
- Incorporated: 1834

Government
  - Type: Borough Council
  - Mayor: Michael Albert
  - Council President: Eric White

Area
  - Total: 0.66 sq mi (1.70 km^{2})
  - Land: 0.66 sq mi (1.70 km^{2})
  - Water: 0 sq mi (0.00 km^{2})
- Elevation: 390 ft (120 m)

Population (2020)
  - Total: 2,257 ▼
  - Estimate (2019): 2,249
  - Density: 3,503.1/sq mi (1,352.54/km^{2})
- Time zone: UTC-5 (Eastern (EST))
  - Summer (DST): UTC-4 (EDT)
- Zip Code: 17368
- Area code: 717
- FIPS code: 42-86640
- Website: www.wrightsvilleborough.com

Wrightsville is a borough in York County, Pennsylvania, United States. The population was 2,257 at the time of the 2020 census. It is part of the York–Hanover metropolitan area.

== History ==
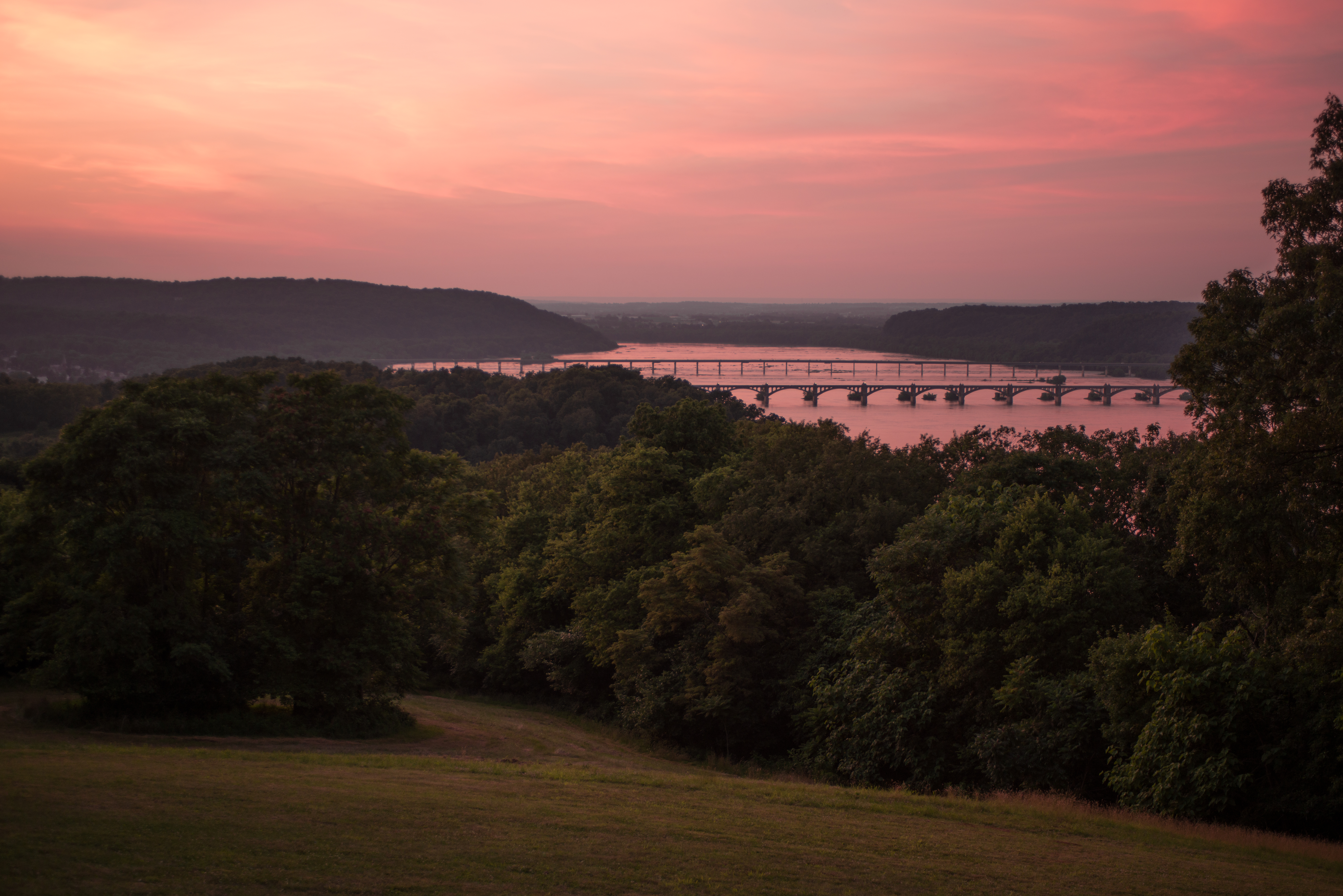
Columbia-Wrightsville Bridge in 2014 (foreground)

According to a plaque at Samuel S. Lewis State Park, which overlooks Wrightsville and the Susquehanna River, Wrightsville was among George Washington's choices as the location of the capital of the United States.

The world's longest covered bridge, at 5,600 feet (1,700 m), once spanned the Susquehanna from Wrightsville to neighboring Columbia in Lancaster County. Built in 1814, it was destroyed by high water and ice in 1832. A replacement bridge was burned the night of June 28, 1863, by state militia during the Gettysburg campaign in the American Civil War. Confederate troops under John Brown Gordon formed a bucket brigade to save the town from fire. Yet another replacement covered bridge was destroyed by a windstorm a few years later.

The final bridge, the Pennsylvania Railroad Bridge, was a steel open-air bridge constructed in 1896. It was razed in the early 1960s because of obsolescence and restructuring of the railroad industry. The site of the former bridge is now home of a concrete bridge known as Wright’s Ferry Bridge. The bridge standing today is approximately 100 yards north of the original bridge location

Wrightsville was the northern terminus of the Susquehanna and Tidewater Canal, which extended to Havre de Grace, Maryland.

In 2007, Wrightsville was the chosen location for the rekindling of the War of the Roses between the York Revolution and the Lancaster Barnstormers baseball teams. Wrightsville was chosen for its location on the Susquehanna River, the boundary between York and Lancaster counties.

The Columbia-Wrightsville Bridge and Wrightsville Historic District are listed on the National Register of Historic Places.

== Geography ==
Wrightsville is located at 40°1′28″N 76°31′52″W (40.024481, -76.531221).

According to the United States Census Bureau, the borough has a total area of 0.6 square miles (1.6 km^{2}), all land.

== Demographics ==
Historical population
Census	Pop.	Note	%±
1840	672		—
1850	1,310		94.9%
1860	1,360		3.8%
1870	1,544		13.5%
1880	1,776		15.0%
1890	1,912		7.7%
1900	2,266		18.5%
1910	2,051		−9.5%
1920	1,943		−5.3%
1930	2,247		15.6%
1940	2,120		−5.7%
1950	2,104		−0.8%
1960	2,345		11.5%
1970	2,668		13.8%
1980	2,365		−11.4%
1990	2,396		1.3%
2000	2,223		−7.2%
2010	2,310		3.9%
2020	2,261		−2.1%
2021 (est.)	2,249	▼	−0.5%

As of the census of 2000, there were 2,223 people, 955 households, and 606 families residing in the borough. The population density was 3,572.8 inhabitants per square mile (1,379.5/km^{2}). There were 1,009 housing units at an average density of 1,621.7 per square mile (626.1/km^{2}). The racial makeup of the borough was 97.62% White, 0.40% African American, 0.09% Native American, 0.36% Asian, 0.54% from other races, and 0.99% from two or more races. Hispanic or Latino of any race were 2.02% of the population.

There were 955 households, out of which 29.7% had children under the age of 18 living with them, 46.1% were married couples living together, 11.1% had a female householder with no husband present, and 36.5% were non-families. 30.6% of all households were made up of individuals, and 11.4% had someone living alone who was 65 years of age or older. The average household size was 2.33 and the average family size was 2.86.

In the borough, the population was spread out, with 23.1% under the age of 18, 7.6% from 18 to 24, 31.4% from 25 to 44, 22.7% from 45 to 64, and 15.2% who were 65 years of age or older. The median age was 38 years. For every 100 females, there were 94.8 males. For every 100 females age 18 and over, there were 92.0 males.

The median income for a household in the borough was $37,379, and the median income for a family was $47,083. Males had a median income of $33,587 versus $23,073 for females. The per capita income for the borough was $18,711. About 4.9% of families and 5.8% of the population were below the poverty line, including 4.8% of those under age 18 and 10.6% of those age 65 or over.

== Politics ==
=== National ===
Wrightsville is district PA-11 in the United States House of Representatives. PA-11's current representative is Republican Lloyd Smucker. He assumed office on January 3, 2017.

=== State and Local ===
Wrightsville is District 28 in the Pennsylvania State Senate. PA-28's current senator is Republican Kristin Phillips-Hill, who assumed office in 2019. Before being elected she served in the Pennsylvania House from 2015 to 2018.

Wrightsville is District 47 in the Pennsylvania State House of Representatives. PA-47 is currently represented by Republican Joe D'Orsie.

== Emergency Services ==
=== Fire Department ===
Although fire protection in Wrightsville Borough can be traced back to the early 1800s, it wasn't until 1887 that the Wrightsville Steam Fire Engine and Hose Company #1 (York County Station 41) was organized. The fire department protects nearly 10,000 citizens in Wrightsville Borough and Hellam Township with an all-volunteer staffing of over 30 active firefighters, as well as a support staff and a junior firefighter program (ages 14–17).

The Wrightsville Fire Department has been recognized by the Commonwealth of Pennsylvania after meeting or exceeding the requirements set forth in the Voluntary Rescue Service Recognition Program. The Wrightsville Fire Department was also a participating department with the Commonwealth's professional certification program in which over 95% of its members are trained to the National Proboard Firefighter 1 & 2 certification levels. In 2019, the department responded to a total of 771 calls for service.

The department is located at 125 South Second Street in Wrightsville Borough. The current facility was completed in 1979, and houses four pieces of fire apparatus: a 1996 Seagrave rescue/pumper (Rescue 41–1), a 2005 Seagrave pumper (Engine 41), a 2005 Ford 550/Semo rescue (Rescue 41–2), and a 2018 Inmar inflatable rescue boat (Boat 41).

=== Medical Services ===
Aside from fire/rescue services, Station 41 provides Quick Response Services (QRS) to residents in Wrightsville Borough and Hellam Township. This includes basic emergency medical care provided by Emergency Medical Technicians and Emergency Medical Responders until transporting EMS units arrive. The average response time for QRS calls was one minute in 2014.

Basic life support (BLS), Advance life support (ALS), and transport coverage is contracted with Lancaster County-based Susquehanna Valley EMS (SVEMS) but respond from the Hellam Township Municipal Building as Ambulance 41. Basic life support services were previously provided by White Rose Ambulance, but ended service on June 1, 2017, after local municipal officials and White Rose Ambulance could not reach an agreement to renew the contract. Although they share the same station number as the Wrightsville Fire Department, there is no affiliation.

=== Police ===
Wrightsville was protected by its own police force until July 1, 2018, when it was merged with nearby stations. Wrightsville Borough is currently protected by the Hellam Township Police Department.

== Education ==
Wrightsville is served by the Eastern York School District.
