= Joseph P. Dando =

American politician

Member of the Pennsylvania Senate from the 29th district
- In office 1937–1940
- Preceded by: Charles W. Staudenmeier
- Succeeded by: G. Harold Watkins

Personal details
- Born: January 14, 1883 Llewellyn, Pennsylvania
- Died: December 6, 1954 Pottsville, Pennsylvania
- Party: Democratic

Joseph Parker Dando (January 14, 1883 – December 6, 1954) was a member of the Pennsylvania State Senate from 1937 to 1940.

Dando was born in the Llewellyn, Butler Township, Schuylkill County, Pennsylvania, son of Isaac Dando (1839-1899) and Margaret A. (Fisher) Dando (1846-1920). He was employed as a coal mine slate picker at age eleven, and had a 23-year career in mines, working his way up to mine superintendent and, eventually, operator. He was a member of the United Mine Workers of America.

Dando married Anna R. James (1882-1964) on October 25, 1904. The couple had seven children.

Dando, because he worked as a youngster in the mining industry, was unable to achieve much education, attending only the public schools. He was quoted as saying “you graduated when you reached the fifth grade” in a reference to the young boys working as slate pickers and at other jobs in the mining industry. This did not prevent Dando from a long history of public service, including as Tax Receiver of Schuylkill County, County Engineer and becoming a member of the School Board in Llewellyn for over 12 years.

He was elected to the Senate as a supporter of Franklin D. Roosevelt's New Deal politics as he defeated the incumbent Charles W. Staudenmeier, who vehemently opposed New Deal policies. He was the first Democratic Senator from this District in the 20th century. In 1939, however, Dando was convicted of misusing WPA labor at his private amusement park in Llewellyn and fined in lieu of a jail term. This led to the election of Republican G. Harold Watkins in 1940.

Dando died in Pottsville, Pennsylvania on December 6, 1954.
