= James J. Rhoades =

American politician (1941–2008)

Member of the Pennsylvania Senate from the 29th district
- In office January 5, 1981 – October 18, 2008
- Preceded by: Joseph Gurzenda
- Succeeded by: Dave Argall

Personal details
- Born: James John Rhoades; December 5, 1941 Waterbury, Connecticut, U.S.
- Died: October 18, 2008 (aged 66) Allentown, Pennsylvania, U.S.
- Party: Republican
- Spouse: Mary Edith Holland
- Children: 3, including Mike
- Relatives: Kevin C. Rhoades (cousin)
- Education: Lehigh University, East Stroudsburg University of Pennsylvania
- Profession: Educator, State Senator

James John Rhoades (December 5, 1941 – October 18, 2008) was a Republican member of the Pennsylvania State Senate who represented the 29th District from 1980 until his death.

== Biography ==
Rhoades graduated from East Stroudsburg University of Pennsylvania in 1963 with a bachelor's degree in education and was a member of Sigma Pi fraternity. He later earned a master's degree in education from Lehigh University in 1966. After graduation, Rhoades began teaching and coaching football in the Pottsville Area School District and Mahanoy Area School District.

After seven years of teaching, Rhoades was appointed as the principal of the Mahanoy Area Intermediate School. He served as principal for ten years before his election to the State Senate.

Rhoades died in the hospital on October 18, 2008, a day after being injured in an automobile accident near Brodheadsville, Pennsylvania, in Monroe County. He had been en route to a Pleasant Valley High School football game. His wife, Mary, was also injured in the crash. Thomas Senavitis was arrested for allegedly driving under the influence and causing the accident with a blood alcohol level of 0.355%, over 4 times the Pennsylvania state limit of 0.08%. Senavitis was convicted of DUI but acquitted on charges of vehicular homicide in March, 2010.

== Career ==
Rhoades was defeated for a seat in the Pennsylvania House of Representatives in 1978. However, in 1980, he won a seat in the Pennsylvania State Senate, defeating Democratic incumbent Joseph Gurzenda.

As a former educator, Rhoades had an interest in education issues and ultimately became Chairman of the Senate Education Committee. As chairman of that committee, Rhoades influenced almost all education-related laws, including the Pennsylvania Safe Schools Act and the Head Start Supplemental Assistance Program.

He also served on the Appropriations, Transportation, Law and Justice, and Environmental Resources and Energy committees.

At the time of Rhoades' death, he was running for his eighth term in the State Senate, making him second behind Stewart Greenleaf on the list of the longest serving senators. With absentee ballots having already been mailed in the state, the county could not remove Rhoades' name from the ballot.

Rhoades was posthumously re-elected with 64% of the vote, prompting a special election to fill his seat. In a special election held on March 3, 2009, Republican state Representative Dave Argall was elected to Rhoades' seat over his Democratic opponent, Schuylkill County Clerk of Courts Steven Lukach, by a margin of 62% to 38%.

== Family ==
Rhoades was the cousin of Bishop Kevin C. Rhoades, the former bishop of the Roman Catholic Diocese of Harrisburg and the current bishop of the Roman Catholic Diocese of Fort Wayne-South Bend. His son Mike is the current head coach of the Penn State men's basketball team.
