= Samuel S. Lewis State Park =

State park in York County, Pennsylvania

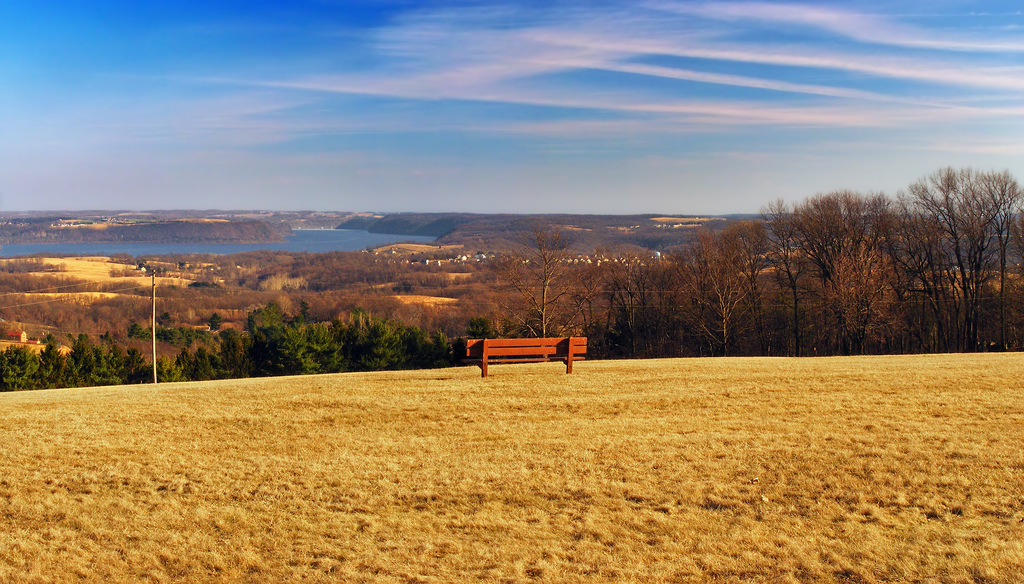

- Location within Pennsylvania Location within the United States
- Interactive map of Samuel S. Lewis State Park
- Location: York County, Pennsylvania, United States
- Coordinates: 39°59′47″N 76°32′57″W
- Area: 85 acres (34 ha)
- Elevation: 689 feet (210 m)
- Established: 1954
- Administrator: Pennsylvania Department of Conservation and Natural Resources
- Website: Official website
- Pennsylvania State Parks

Samuel S. Lewis State Park is an 85-acre (34 ha) Pennsylvania state park in Lower Windsor Township, York County, Pennsylvania, in the United States. Mt. Pisgah is an 885-foot-high (270 m) ridge that is the focus of recreation for the park. The ridge separates East Prospect Valley from Kreutz Creek Valley. An overlook on Mt. Pisgah gives visitors a view of the Susquehanna River Valley. Samuel S. Lewis Park is twelve miles (19 km) east of York near U.S. Highway 30.

== History ==
The land on which Samuel S. Lewis Park came together from four different pieces of property. Samuel S. Lewis, the namesake of the park, donated his 35-acre (14 ha) farm to the Commonwealth of Pennsylvania in 1954. Walter Stein sold his 1-acre (4,000 m^{2}) arboretum to the state in the same year. The state bought an additional 15 acres (6.1 ha) from the Almoney Farm to complete the initial parcel of park land. The last piece came into place in 1999 when the state purchased an additional 14 acres (5.7 ha) of land.

== Recreation ==
Samuel S. Lewis State Park offers recreational opportunities for many visitors. Picnic tables are available on a first come first served basis and three pavilions may be reserved for day use. There is a one-mile (1.6 km) hiking trail through a pine forest bypassing some rock formations. The crest of Mt. Pisgah is ideal for kite flying. Kite flying clubs gather here to hone their skills and offer help to novice kite flyers.

== Scenic view ==
Mt. Pisgah is the highest point in the area. The scenic view atop Mt. Pisgah offers a panoramic view of the surrounding towns, fields, and the Susquehanna River. It has become a popular spot for astronomical observation as clubs frequently hold star-gazing events at the overlook. The summit of Mt. Pisgah is also a popular site for weddings.
