= Frederick Hobbs (Pennsylvania politician) =

American politician from Pennsylvania

Frederick H. Hobbs

Member of the Pennsylvania Senate from the 29th district
- In office 1967–1976
- Preceded by: Paul L. Wagner
- Succeeded by: Joseph E. Gurzenda

Personal details
- Born: January 6, 1934 Pottsville, Pennsylvania
- Died: July 22, 2005 (aged 71) Pottsville, Pennsylvania
- Party: Republican

Frederick H. Hobbs (January 6, 1934 – July 22, 2005) is a former member of the Pennsylvania State Senate, serving as a Republican from 1967 to 1976.

== Formative years ==
Born in Pottsville, Pennsylvania on January 6, 1934, Frederick Hobbs was a son of H. (Howard) Blake Hobbs (1911–1973) of Nescopeck and Marian Hause (1908–1984) of Pottsville. His father founded the Telephone Answering Service in Allentown in 1939, and was a high school teacher in Lehigh County.

Hobbs graduated from Governor Dummer Academy in Byfield, Massachusetts, Amherst College and Georgetown University School of Law. He then also served in the United States Army.

== Career and family ==
Beginning in 1961, he maintained a law practice in Pottsville while serving as solicitor for the Schuylkill County Housing Authority, the Schuylkill County Commissioners and the Blythe Township Planning Commission, and also representing the State Workers' Insurance Fund.

Hobbs served in the Pennsylvania State Senate for ten years (1967–1976), where he was the Republican Minority Chairman of the committee on Business and Commerce and also served on the Judiciary, Law and Justice, Insurance and State Government and Finance committees.

In 1968, Hobbs married Pamela Watkins (born 1943) of Butler Township. Her father was G. Harold Watkins, who had been the Pennsylvania state senator for the same 29th District from 1941 to 1944.

Hobbs was a member of the Executive Committee of the Schuylkill County Republican Committee, and was also a member of the Sons of the American Revolution.

In 1974, Hobbs took part in a mock trial of John Kehoe, an alleged Mollie Maguire ringleader. During the program, which was sponsored by the Schuylkill County Historical Society, Hobbs acted as the presiding judge; the original evidence was presented under modern day court rules. The mock trial jury found the defendant "Not Guilty" after deliberating thirty minutes.

In 1976, Hobbs lost his seat to Democratic candidate Joseph Gurzenda, becoming only the second Republican to lose this seat since 1900.

After his election defeat, he served on the board of directors of the Union Bank & Trust Co. and the Schuylkill County Drug & Alcohol Commission, as well as other community and fraternal groups. Although he was thought to be a future candidate for a judgeship, that never came to fruition.
