= Ravine, Pennsylvania =

Unincorporated community in Pennsylvania, US

Ravine
- Census-designated place
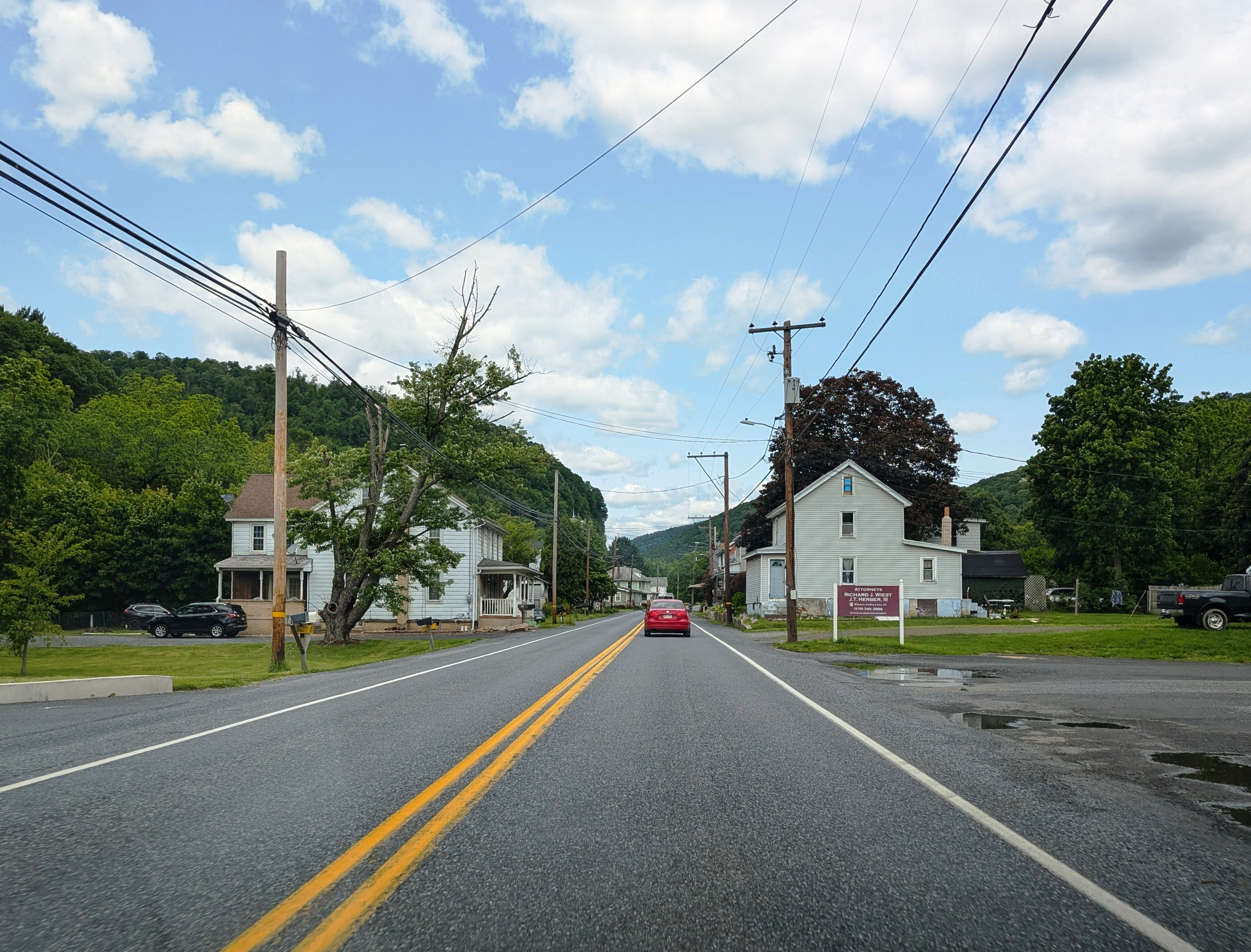
- PA 125 northbound through Ravine

- Location within the U.S. state of Pennsylvania Ravine (the United States)
- Coordinates: 40°34′4″N 76°23′31″W
- Country: United States
- State: Pennsylvania
- County: Schuylkill

Area
  - Total: 1.09 sq mi (2.83 km^{2})
  - Land: 1.09 sq mi (2.83 km^{2})
  - Water: 0 sq mi (0.00 km^{2})

Population (2020)
  - Total: 622
  - Density: 570.2/sq mi (220.14/km^{2})
- Time zone: UTC-5 (Eastern (EST))
  - Summer (DST): UTC-4 (EDT)
- ZIP code: 17963
- Area codes: 272 and 570
- FIPS code: 42-63536

Ravine is a census-designated place (CDP) in Pine Grove Township, Schuylkill County, Pennsylvania, United States. The population was 629 at the 2000 census.

== Geography ==
Ravine is located at 40°34′4″N 76°23′31″W (40.567729, -76.392063).

According to the United States Census Bureau, the CDP has a total area of 1.1 square miles (2.8 km^{2}), all land.

== Demographics ==
Historical population
Census	Pop.	Note	%±
2020	622		—
U.S. Decennial Census

At the 2000 census there were 629 people, 271 households, and 195 families living in the CDP. The population density was 584.7 inhabitants per square mile (225.8/km^{2}). There were 281 housing units at an average density of 261.2 per square mile (100.8/km^{2}). The racial makeup of the CDP was 98.89% White, 0.64% Asian, and 0.48% from two or more races. Of the 271 households 27.7% had children under the age of 18 living with them, 51.3% were married couples living together, 14.0% had a female householder with no husband present, and 28.0% were non-families. 23.2% of households were one person and 12.2% were one person aged 65 or older. The average household size was 2.32 and the average family size was 2.68.

The age distribution was 21.9% under the age of 18, 7.6% from 18 to 24, 28.8% from 25 to 44, 23.8% from 45 to 64, and 17.8% 65 or older. The median age was 40 years. For every 100 females, there were 85.5 males. For every 100 females age 18 and over, there were 81.9 males.

The median household income was $30,739 and the median family income was $41,563. Males had a median income of $30,833 versus $25,179 for females. The per capita income for the CDP was $16,297. About 11.6% of families and 15.0% of the population were below the poverty line, including 36.4% of those under age 18 and none of those age 65 or over.

== Education ==
The school district is Pine Grove Area School District.
