= Renningers, Pennsylvania =

Unincorporated community in Pennsylvania, US

Renningers
- Census-designated place
- Location within the U.S. state of Pennsylvania Renningers (the United States)
- Coordinates: 40°38′58″N 76°8′47″W
- Country: United States
- State: Pennsylvania
- County: Schuylkill

Area
  - Total: 1.17 sq mi (3.02 km^{2})
  - Land: 1.17 sq mi (3.02 km^{2})
  - Water: 0 sq mi (0.00 km^{2})

Population (2020)
  - Total: 594
  - Density: 509.6/sq mi (196.75/km^{2})
- Time zone: UTC-5 (Eastern (EST))
  - Summer (DST): UTC-4 (EDT)
- FIPS code: 42-64188

Renningers is a census-designated place (CDP) in North Manheim Township, Pennsylvania, United States. The population was 594 at the 2020 census.

== Geography ==
According to the United States Census Bureau, the CDP has a total area of 1.1 square miles (2.8 km^{2}), all land.

== Demographics ==
Historical population
Census	Pop.	Note	%±
2020	594		—
U.S. Decennial Census

At the 2000 census there were 380 people, 145 households, and 108 families living in the CDP. The population density was 332.4 inhabitants per square mile (128.3/km^{2}). There were 156 housing units at an average density of 136.5 per square mile (52.7/km^{2}). The racial makeup of the CDP was 99.74% White, and 0.26% from two or more races. Hispanic or Latino of any race were 0.79%.

Of the 145 households 32.4% had children under the age of 18 living with them, 62.1% were married couples living together, 7.6% had a female householder with no husband present, and 25.5% were non-families. 19.3% of households were one person and 12.4% were one person aged 65 or older. The average household size was 2.62 and the average family size was 3.00.

The age distribution was 23.7% under the age of 18, 5.8% from 18 to 24, 32.9% from 25 to 44, 24.7% from 45 to 64, and 12.9% 65 or older. The median age was 36 years. For every 100 females, there were 100.0 males. For every 100 females age 18 and over, there were 97.3 males.

The median household income was $53,750 and the median family income was $56,307. Males had a median income of $34,297 versus $16,058 for females. The per capita income for the CDP was $14,391. About 8.9% of families and 12.7% of the population were below the poverty line, including 24.8% of those under age 18 and 17.9% of those age 65 or over.
