= Tremont, Pennsylvania =

Borough in Pennsylvania, US

- Borough
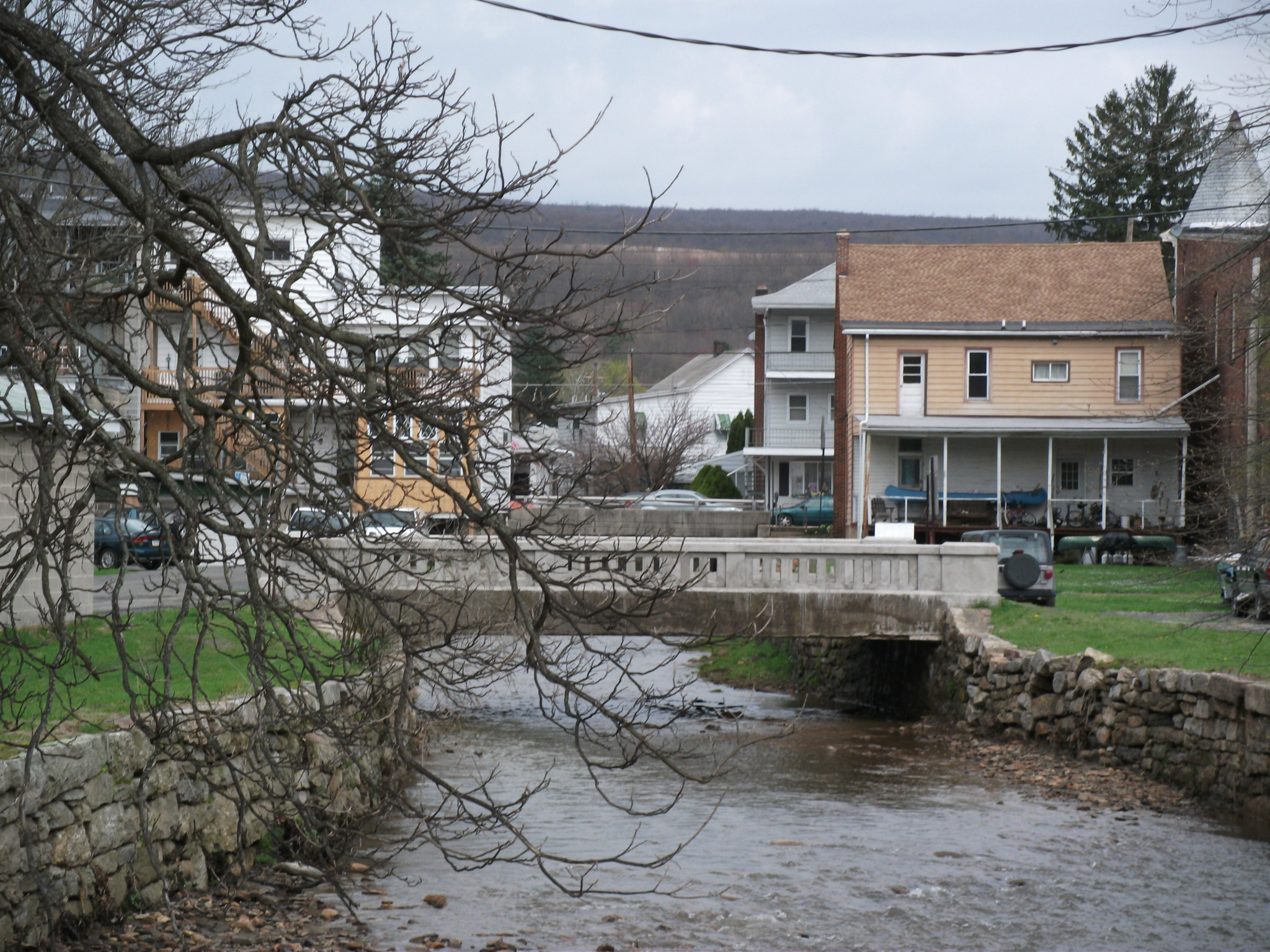
- Tremont

- Location of Tremont in Schuylkill County, Pennsylvania.

- Location in Pennsylvania Tremont (the United States)
- Coordinates: 40°37′48″N 76°23′23″W
- Country: United States
- State: Pennsylvania
- County: Schuylkill
- Settled: 1844
- Incorporated: 1866

Government
  - Type: Borough Council
  - Mayor: Justin Moeller

Area
  - Total: 0.73 sq mi (1.88 km^{2})
  - Land: 0.73 sq mi (1.88 km^{2})
  - Water: 0 sq mi (0.00 km^{2})

Population (2020)
  - Total: 1,676
  - Density: 2,309.5/sq mi (891.72/km^{2})
- Time zone: UTC-5 (Eastern (EST))
  - Summer (DST): UTC-4 (EDT)
- ZIP code: 17981
- Area code: 570
- FIPS code: 42-77392
- Website: https://tremontborough.org/

Tremont is a borough in Schuylkill County, Pennsylvania, United States. Situated in the eastern section of Tremont Township, it was incorporated as a borough in 1866, around the same time that a water system was erected in the community.

The population was 1,672 at the time of the 2020 U.S. Census.

== History ==
According to historian Samuel T. Wiley, no major buildings had been erected, by 1844, on the land that would eventually become the borough of Tremont, while historians Adolf Schalck and David Henning stated that a concerted settlement effort began here sometime that year, "stimulated by the extensive coal developments in the vicinity."

Within four years, the Tremont Iron Works had been established by Umholtz & Lentz (1847) and a new post office had been established there (1848) with John B. Zeibach serving as its first postmaster. The first National Bank of Tremont subsequently opened its doors in 1865.

Incorporated as a borough in Schuylkill County, Pennsylvania in 1866, Tremont was home to a water works system that was built by Isaac P. Bechtel around the same time as the community's legal formation. The initial cost of construction was $20,000.

Four years later, Bechtel established the Tremont Water and Gas Company. Construction on Bechtel's water works system was then completed in December 1874.

The community also supported two newspapers: the Tremont News and the West Schuylkill Press, the latter of which was established and operated by S. C. Kirk until 1884, when he transferred editorial control to John A. Bechtel.

== Geography ==
Tremont is located at 40°37′48″N 76°23′23″W (40.630052, -76.389677).

According to the United States Census Bureau, the borough has a total area of 0.8 square miles (2.1 km^{2}), all land.

== Demographics ==
Historical population
Census	Pop.	Note	%±
1870	1,709		—
1880	1,785		4.4%
1890	2,064		15.6%
1900	1,947		−5.7%
1910	2,067		6.2%
1920	2,015		−2.5%
1930	2,304		14.3%
1940	2,314		0.4%
1950	2,102		−9.2%
1960	1,893		−9.9%
1970	1,833		−3.2%
1980	1,796		−2.0%
1990	1,814		1.0%
2000	1,784		−1.7%
2010	1,752		−1.8%
2020	1,676		−4.3%
2021 (est.)	1,674	▼	−0.1%
U.S. Decennial Census

At the time of the 2000 census, there were one thousand seven hundred and eighty-four people, six hundred and ninety-five households and four hundred and forty-two families living in the borough.

The population density was 2,305.5 inhabitants per square mile (890.2/km^{2}). There were seven hundred and forty-nine housing units at an average density of 968.0 per square mile (373.7/km^{2}).

The racial makeup of the borough was 98.99% White, 0.39% African American, 0.06% Native American, 0.06% Asian, 0.06% Pacific Islander, and 0.45% from two or more races. Hispanic or Latino of any race were 0.06%.

Of the six hundred and ninety-five households, 26.8% had children under the age of eighteen living with them, 49.2% were married couples living together, 10.1% had a female householder with no husband present, and 36.4% were non-families. 30.5% of households were one person and 17.6% were one person aged sixty-five or older.

The average household size was 2.36 and the average family size was 2.95.

The age distribution was 20.5% under the age of eighteen, 7.6% from eighteen to twenty-four, 24.4% from twenty-five to forty-four, 23.3% from forty-five to sixty-four, and 24.3% who were aged sixty-five or older. The median age was forty-three years.

For every one hundred females, there were 86.0 males. For every one hundred females aged eighteen and over, there were 82.2 males.

The median household income was $30,167 and the median family income was $35,326. Males had a median income of $31,542 compared with that of $20,395 for females.

The per capita income for the borough was $14,698.

Roughly 9.5% of families and 13.1% of the population were below the poverty line, including 28.2% of those under the age of eighteen and 5.5% of those who were aged sixty-five or over.

== Education ==
The school district is Pine Grove Area School District.
