= South Manheim Township, Pennsylvania =

Township in Pennsylvania, US

Coordinates: 40°36′10″N 76°08′40″W

- Township
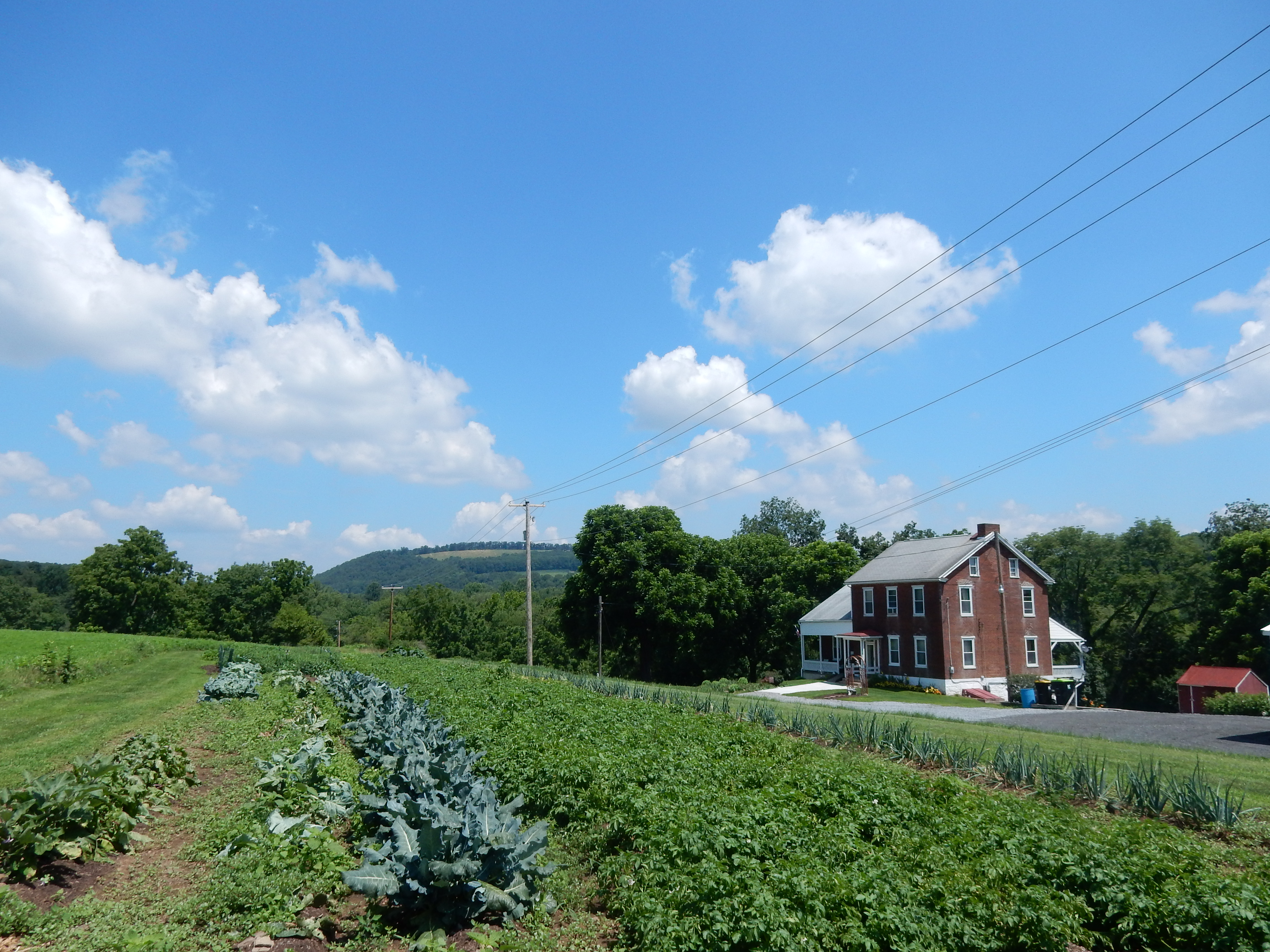
- Farmhouse on Meadow Drive.

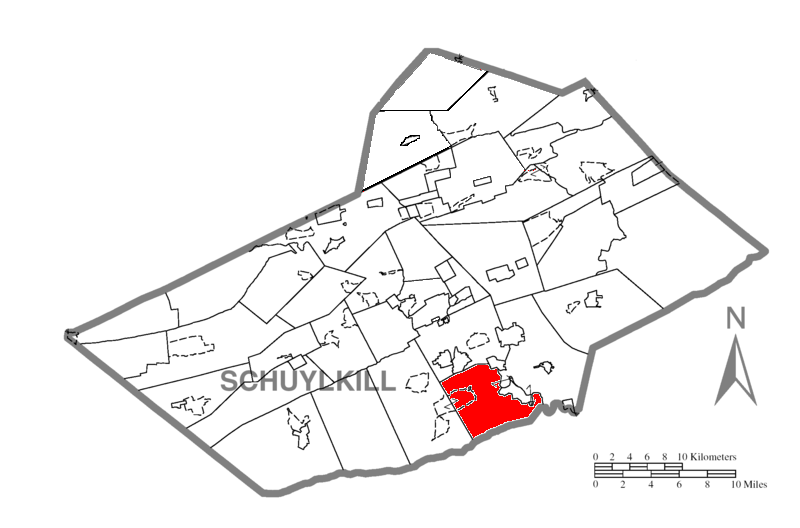
- Map of Schuylkill County, Pennsylvania Highlighting South Manheim Township

- Map of Schuylkill County, Pennsylvania
- Country: United States
- State: Pennsylvania
- County: Schuylkill
- Settled: 1777
- Incorporated: 1845

Area
  - Total: 21.17 sq mi (54.83 km^{2})
  - Land: 20.78 sq mi (53.81 km^{2})
  - Water: 0.39 sq mi (1.02 km^{2})

Population (2020)
  - Total: 2,730 ▲
  - Estimate (2021): 2,751
  - Density: 121.0/sq mi (46.72/km^{2})
- Time zone: UTC-5 (Eastern (EST))
  - Summer (DST): UTC-4 (EDT)
- FIPS code: 42-107-72312
- Website: https://southmanheimtwp.com/

South Manheim Township is a township that is located in Schuylkill County, Pennsylvania, United States. The population was 2,751 at the time of the 2020 census.

== History ==
South Manheim Township was created in 1845 by dividing Manheim Township into South Manheim and North Manheim townships.

== Geography ==
According to the U.S. Census Bureau, the township has a total area of 21.0 square miles (54.3 km^{2}), of which 20.6 square miles (53.3 km^{2}) is land and 0.4 square mile (1.0 km^{2}) (1.77%) is water. It contains part of the census-designated place of Lake Wynonah.

== Demographics ==
Historical population
Census	Pop.	Note	%±
2010	2,507		—
2020	2,730		8.9%
2021 (est.)	2,751		0.8%
U.S. Decennial Census

At the time of the 2000 census, there were 2,191 people, 796 households, and 643 families living in the township.

The population density was 106.4 inhabitants per square mile (41.1/km^{2}). There were 966 housing units at an average density of 46.9 per square mile (18.1/km^{2}).

The racial makeup of the township was 98.31% White, 0.46% African American, 0.23% Asian, 0.37% from other races, and 0.64% from two or more races. Hispanic or Latino of any race were 0.68%.

Of the 796 households documented by the federal census, 35.6% had children under the age of eighteen living with them, 74.0% were married couples living together, 5.0% had a female householder with no husband present, and 19.2% were non-families. 14.9% of households were one-person households and 6.3% were one-person households with residents who were aged sixty-five or older.

The average household size was 2.75 and the average family size was 3.07.

The age distribution was 25.9% of residents who were under the age of eighteen, 5.3% who were aged eighteen to twenty-four, 29.8% who were aged twenty-five to forty-four, 25.8% who were aged forty-five to sixty-four, and 13.1% who were aged sixty-five or older. The median age was thirty-nine years.

For every one hundred females, there were 97.6 males. For every one hundred females who were aged eighteen or older, there were 97.9 males.

The median household income was $46,786 and the median family income was $49,757. Males had a median income of $37,629 compared with that of $26,375 for females.

The per capita income for the township was $19,638.

Approximately 2.0% of families and 3.0% of the population were living below the poverty line, including 2.2% of those who were under the age of eighteen and 4.5% of those who were aged sixty-five or older.
