= Lake Wynonah, Pennsylvania =

Unincorporated community in Pennsylvania, US

Lake Wynonah
- Census-designated place
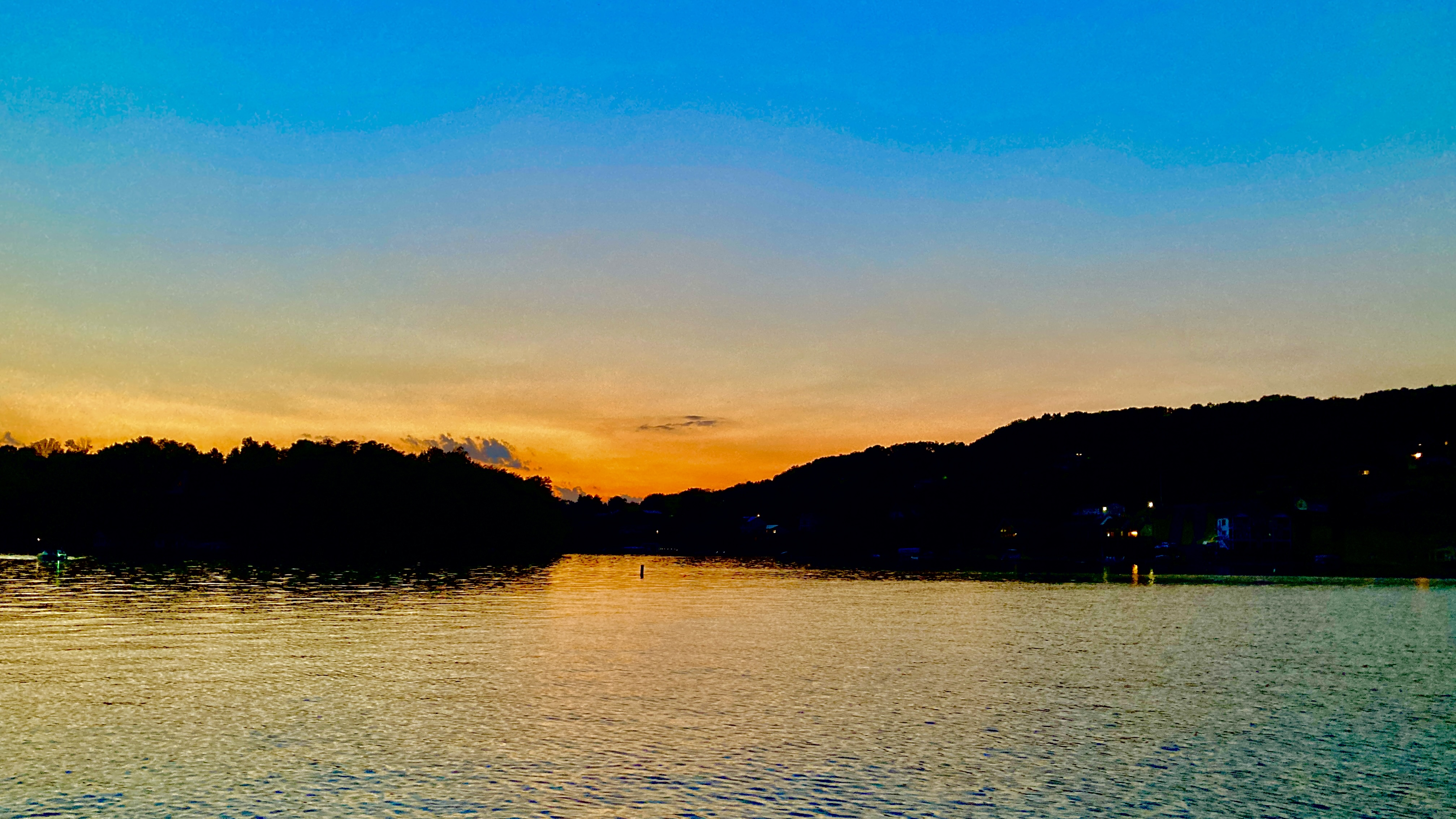
- Sunset photo at Lake Wynonah Pennsylvania from August 23, 2021
- Motto: Life on Vacation!
- Location within the U.S. state of Pennsylvania Lake Wynonah (the United States)
- Coordinates: 40°35′16″N 76°10′58″W
- Country: United States
- State: Pennsylvania
- County: Schuylkill

Area
  - Total: 3.47 sq mi (8.98 km^{2})
  - Land: 3.17 sq mi (8.21 km^{2})
  - Water: 0.30 sq mi (0.77 km^{2})

Population (2020)
  - Total: 2,858
  - Density: 901.7/sq mi (348.16/km^{2})
- Time zone: UTC-5 (Eastern (EST))
  - Summer (DST): UTC-4 (EDT)
- ZIP codes: 17922
- Area code: 570
- FIPS code: 42-41099

Lake Wynonah is a census-designated place (CDP) in Schuylkill County, Pennsylvania, United States. The population was 1,961 at the 2000 census, and 2,640 at the 2010 census. Lake Wynonah is a gated community with two lakes, Fawn Lake and Lake Wynonah, and as of July 2008, there are over 1200 homes and 1500 members. It is in South Manheim and Wayne Townships.

== Geography ==
Lake Wynonah is located at 40°35′16″N 76°10′58″W (40.587784, -76.182714).

According to the United States Census Bureau, the CDP has a total area of 3.2 square miles (8.3 km^{2}), of which 2.9 square miles (7.5 km^{2}) is land and 0.3 square miles (0.78 km^{2}) (9.54%) is water. Plum Creek flows eastward through the lakes into the Schuylkill River. The CDP is served by the Auburn post office, with the zip code of 17922.

== Demographics ==
Historical population
Census	Pop.	Note	%±
2020	2,858		—
U.S. Decennial Census

As of the census of 2000, there were 1,961 people, 718 households, and 595 families residing in the CDP. The population density was 667.2 inhabitants per square mile (257.6/km^{2}). There were 903 housing units at an average density of 307.2 per square mile (118.6/km^{2}). The racial makeup of the CDP was 98.11% White, 0.46% African American, 0.31% Asian, 0.56% from other races, and 0.56% from two or more races. Hispanic or Latino of any race were 1.02% of the population.

There were 718 households, out of which 37.9% had children under the age of 18 living with them, 75.9% were married couples living together, 4.5% had a female householder with no husband present, and 17.1% were non-families. 12.4% of all households were made up of individuals, and 2.8% had someone living alone who was 65 years of age or older. The average household size was 2.73 and the average family size was 2.99.

In the CDP, the population was spread out, with 26.8% under the age of 18, 4.6% from 18 to 24, 31.6% from 25 to 44, 25.8% from 45 to 64, and 11.3% who were 65 years of age or older. The median age was 38 years. For every 100 females, there were 100.7 males. For every 100 females aged 18 and over, there were 100.0 males.

The median income for a household in the CDP was $51,000, and the median income for a family was $52,121. Males had a median income of $39,250 versus $24,375 for females. The per capita income for the CDP was $19,886. About 1.8% of families and 1.6% of the population were below the poverty line, including 1.9% of those under age 18 and none of those age 65 or over.
