= Landingville, Pennsylvania =

Borough in Pennsylvania, US

- Borough
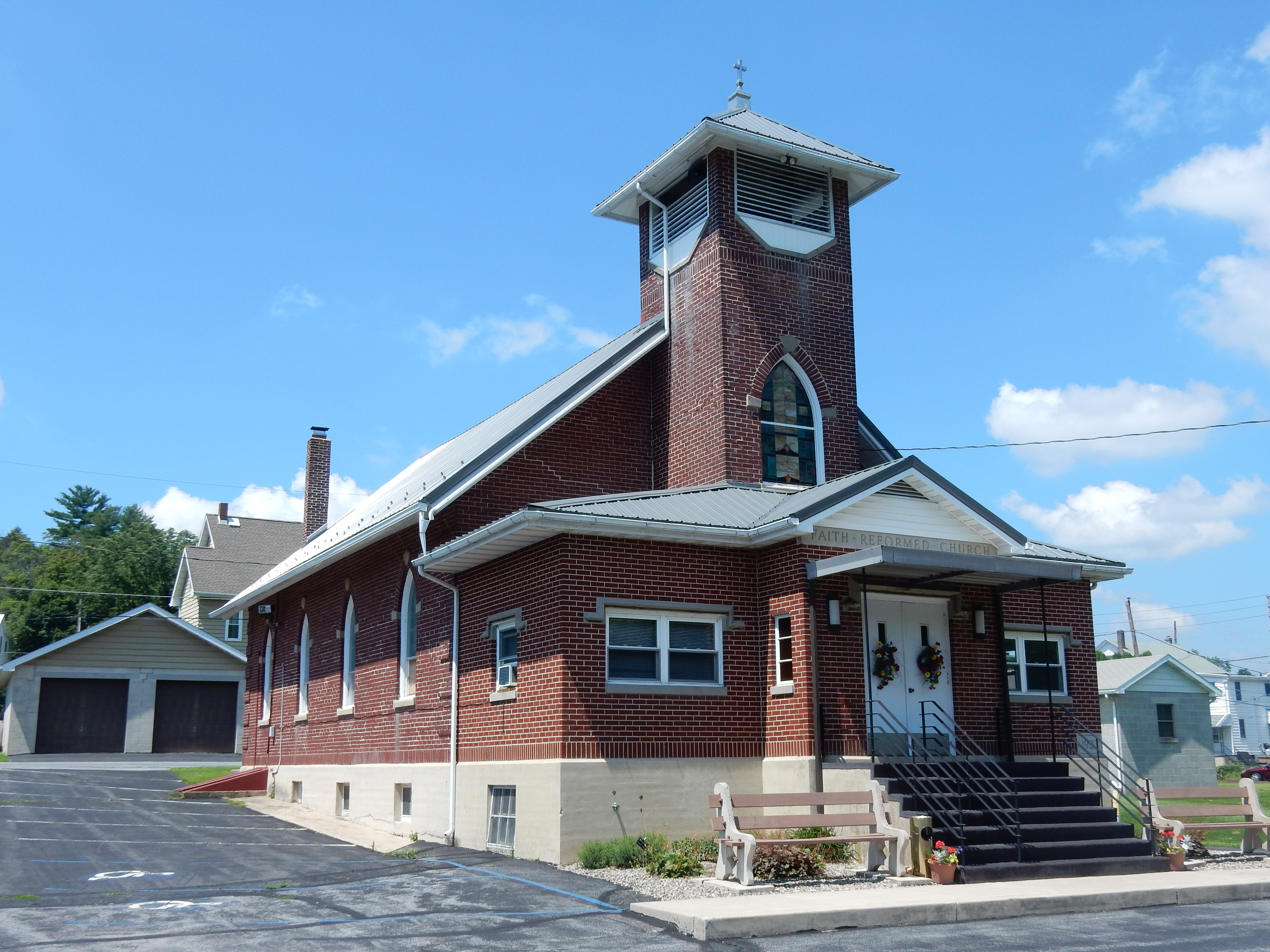
- Landingville. Faith United Church of Christ.

- Location of Landingville in Schuylkill County, Pennsylvania.

- Location in Pennsylvania Landingville (the United States)
- Coordinates: 40°37′35″N 76°07′24″W
- Country: United States
- State: Pennsylvania
- County: Schuylkill
- Incorporated: 1887

Government
  - Type: Borough Council

Area
  - Total: 0.86 sq mi (2.22 km^{2})
  - Land: 0.86 sq mi (2.22 km^{2})
  - Water: 0 sq mi (0.00 km^{2})

Population (2020)
  - Total: 138
  - Density: 160.8/sq mi (62.09/km^{2})
- Time zone: UTC-5 (Eastern (EST))
  - Summer (DST): UTC-4 (EDT)
- ZIP code: 17942
- Area code: 570
- FIPS code: 42-41264

Landingville is a borough in Schuylkill County, Pennsylvania, United States. The population was 137 at the time of the 2020 census.

== Geography ==
Landingville is located at 40°37′35″N 76°7′24″W (40.626509, -76.123342).

According to the United States Census Bureau, the borough has a total area of 0.8 square miles (2.1 km^{2}), all of it land.

== Demographics ==
Historical population
Census	Pop.	Note	%±
1880	712		—
1890	316		−55.6%
1900	244		−22.8%
1910	268		9.8%
1920	245		−8.6%
1930	273		11.4%
1940	255		−6.6%
1950	230		−9.8%
1960	224		−2.6%
1970	175		−21.9%
1980	170		−2.9%
1990	192		12.9%
2000	175		−8.9%
2010	159		−9.1%
2020	138		−13.2%
2021 (est.)	138	Steady	0.0%

As of the census of 2000, there were 175 people, 68 households, and 45 families residing in the borough.

The population density was 207.6 inhabitants per square mile (80.2/km^{2}). There were 74 housing units at an average density of 87.8 per square mile (33.9/km^{2}).

The racial makeup of the borough was 99.43% White, and 0.57% from two or more races.

There were 68 households, out of which 35.3% had children under the age of eighteen living with them; 54.4% were married couples living together, 11.8% had a female householder with no husband present, and 32.4% were non-families. 25.0% of all households were made up of individuals, and 13.2% had someone living alone who was sixty-five years of age or older.

The average household size was 2.57 and the average family size was 3.04.

In the borough the population was spread out, with 25.7% under the age of eighteen, 8.6% from eighteen to twenty-four, 28.6% from twenty-five to forty-four, 25.7% from forty-five to sixty-four, and 11.4% who were sixty-five years of age or older. The median age was thirty-seven years.

For every one hundred females, there were 88.2 males. For every one hundred females aged eighteen and over, there were 78.1 males.

The median income for a household in the borough was $40,417, and the median income for a family was $41,667. Males had a median income of $33,571 compared with that of $18,750 for females.

The per capita income for the borough was $16,965.

Roughly 4.2% of families and 9.5% of the population were living below the poverty line, including 12.8% of those who were under the age of eighteen and 21.4% of those who were aged sixty-five or over.

== Gallery ==
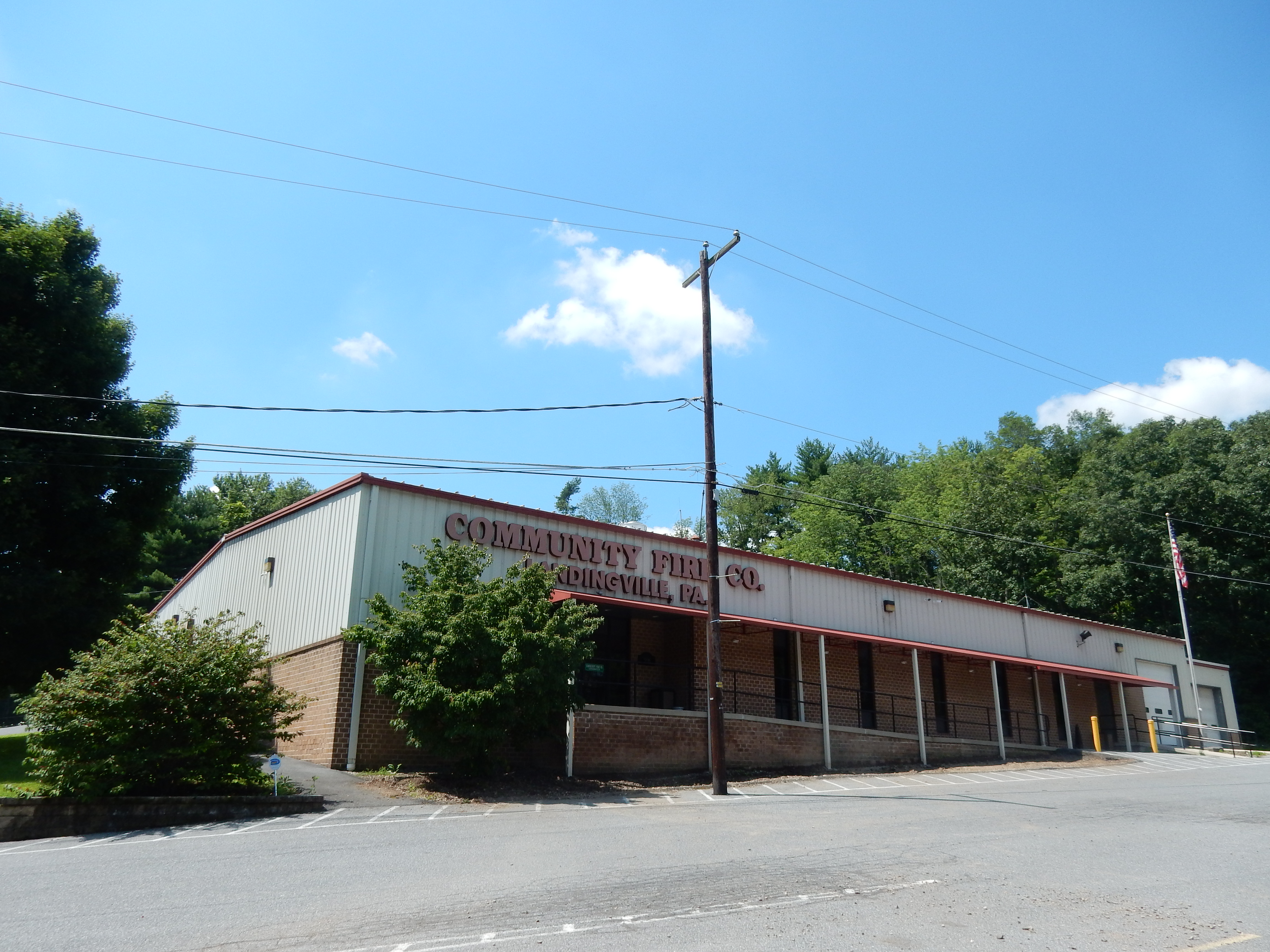
Community Fire Co.

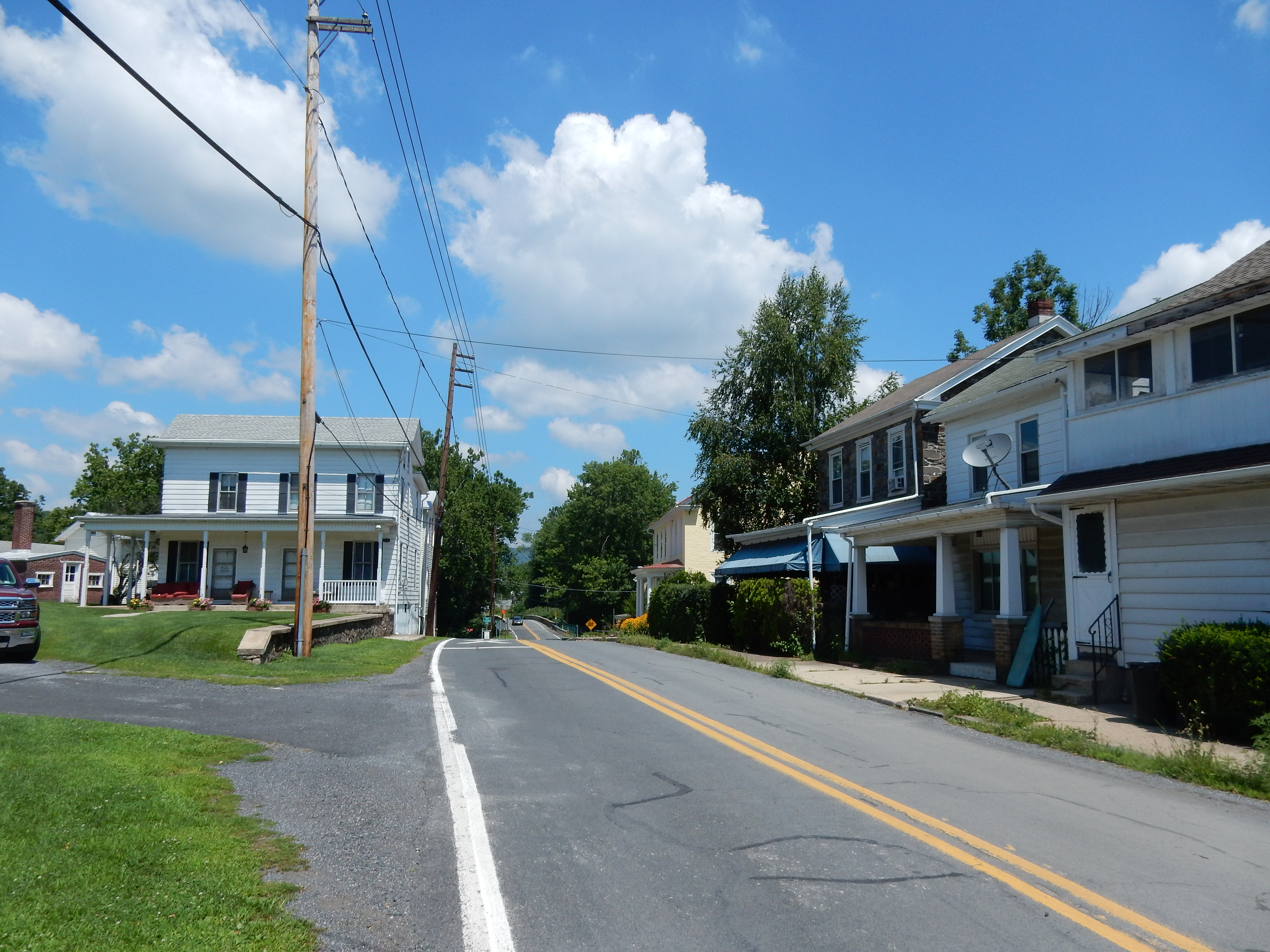
Main St.

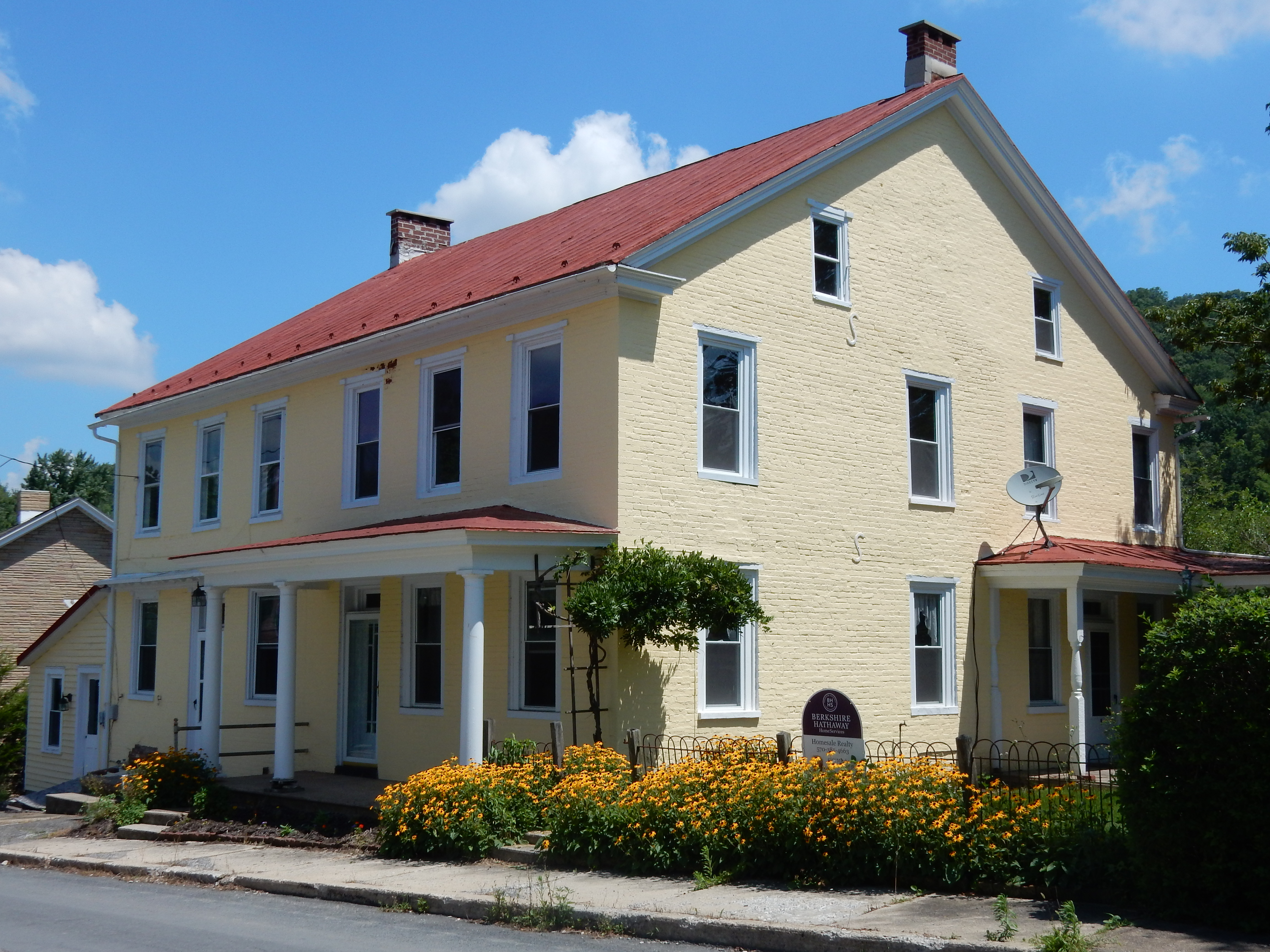
Residence on Main St.

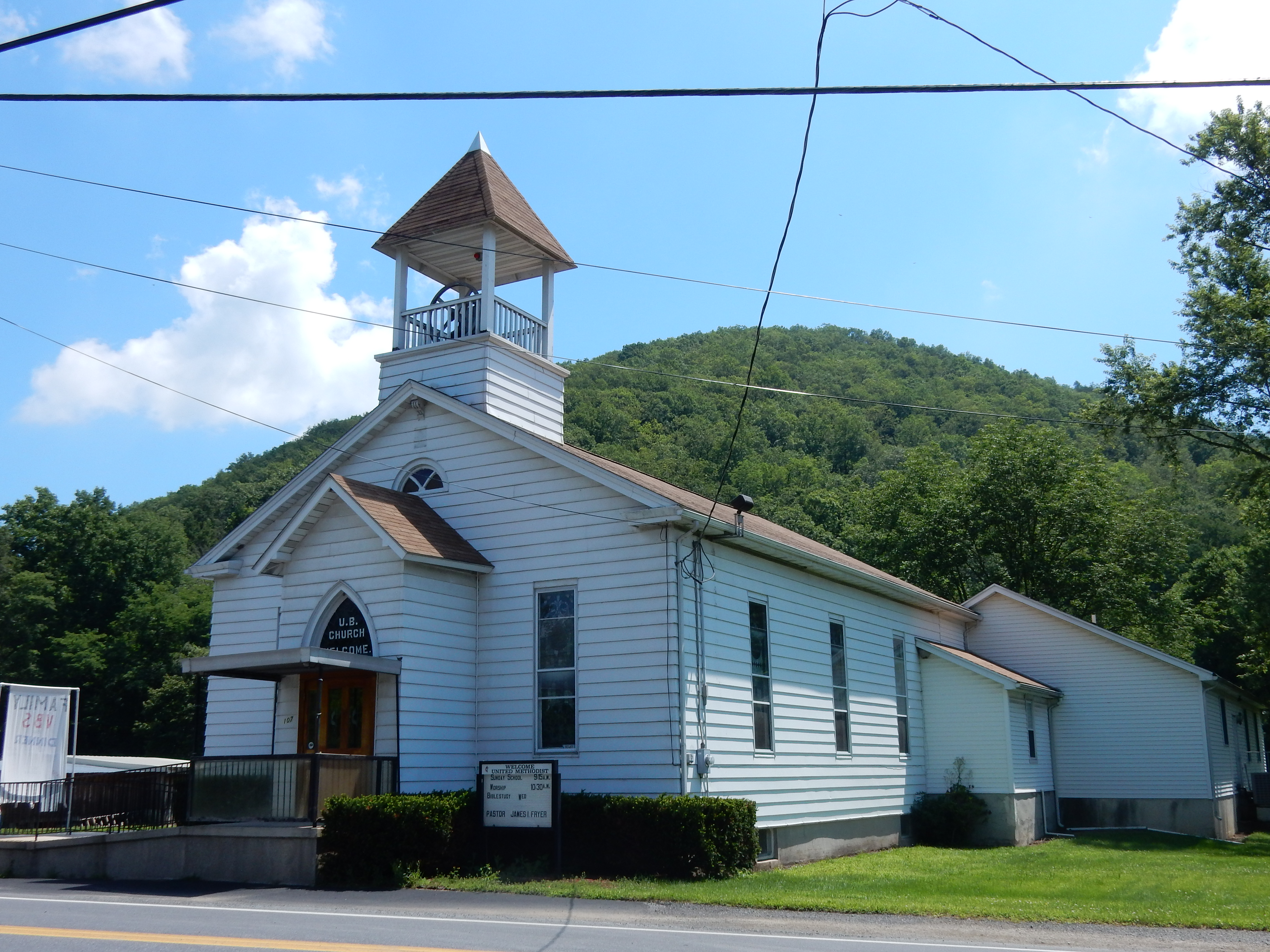
Welcome United Methodist Church.

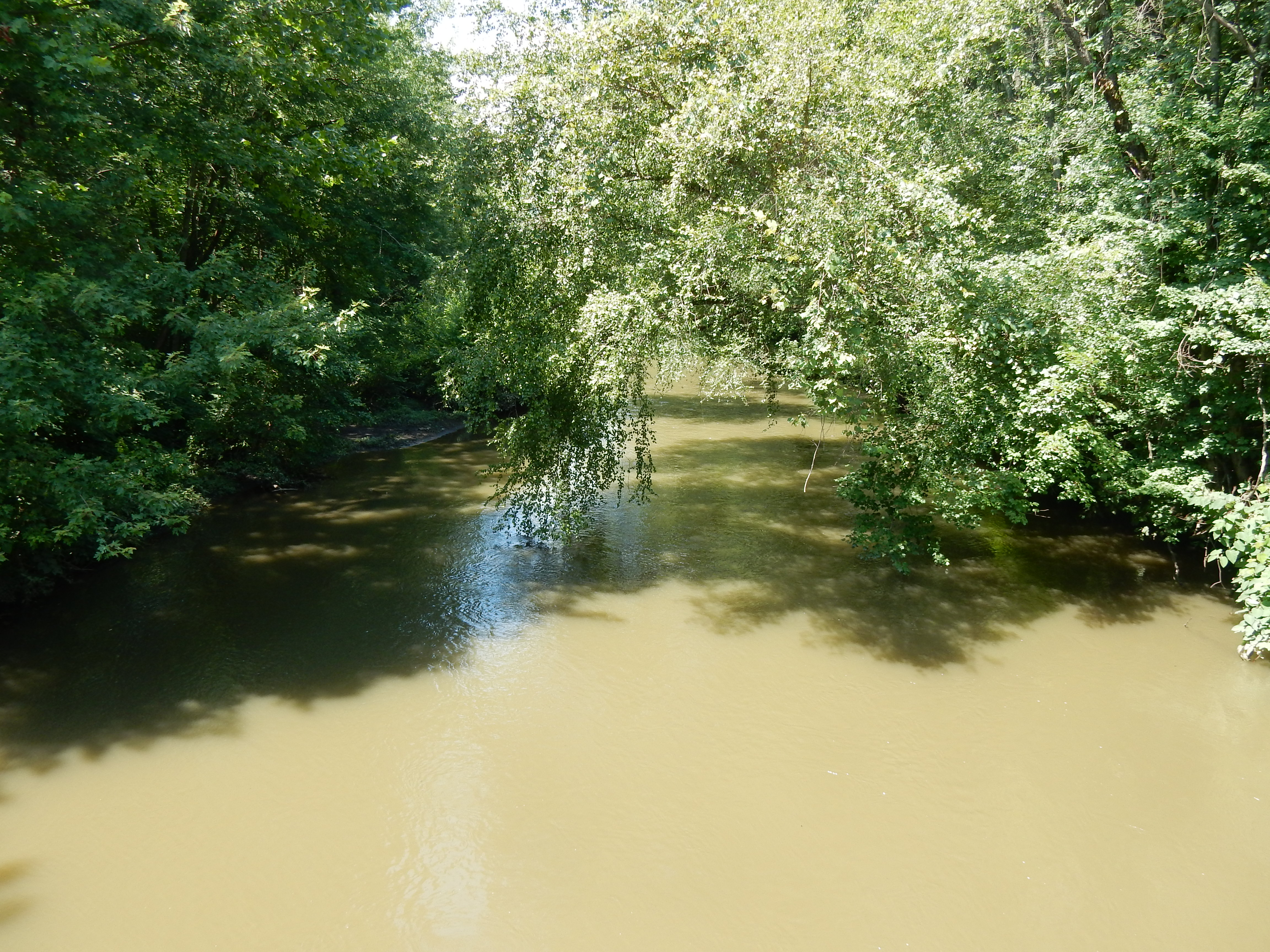
Schuylkill River in Landingville.
