= Schuylkill County, Pennsylvania =

County in Pennsylvania, United States

- County
- Schuylkill County Courthouse in Pottsville

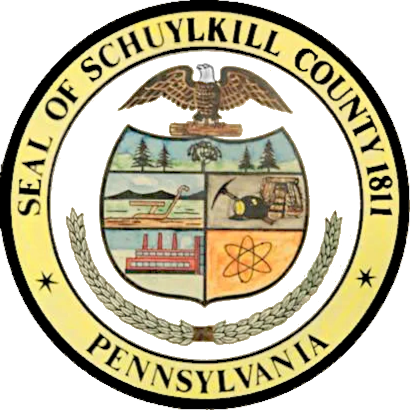
- Seal

- Location within the U.S. state of Pennsylvania
- Coordinates: 40°42′N 76°13′W
- Country: United States
- State: Pennsylvania
- Founded: March 1, 1811
- Named for: Schuylkill River
- Seat: Pottsville
- Largest city: Pottsville

Area
  - Total: 783 sq mi (2,030 km^{2})
  - Land: 779 sq mi (2,020 km^{2})
  - Water: 4.2 sq mi (11 km^{2}) 0.5%

Population (2020)
  - Total: 143,049
  - Estimate (2025): 145,085 ▲
  - Density: 184/sq mi (71/km^{2})
- Time zone: UTC−5 (Eastern)
  - Summer (DST): UTC−4 (EDT)
- Area code: 570 and 717
- Congressional district: 9th
- Website: schuylkillcountypa.gov

Schuylkill County (/ˈskuːlkɪl/, locally /-kəl/; Pennsylvania Dutch: Schulkill Kaundi) is a county in the Commonwealth of Pennsylvania. As of the 2020 census, the population was 143,049. The county seat is Pottsville. The county is part of the Northeast Pennsylvania region of the state. (Note: Includes Luzerne, Lackawanna, Monroe, Schuylkill, Carbon, Pike, Bradford, Wayne, Susquehanna, Wyoming and Sullivan Counties)

The county is part of the Pottsville micropolitan statistical area, and borders eight counties: Berks and Lebanon counties to its south, Dauphin and Northumberland counties to its west, Columbia and Luzerne counties to its north, and Carbon and Lehigh counties to its east. The county is approximately 47 miles (76 km) west of Allentown, the state's third-largest city, and 97 miles (156 km) northwest of Philadelphia, the state's largest city.

The county was created on March 1, 1811, from parts of Berks and Northampton counties and named for the Schuylkill River, which originates in the county. On March 3, 1818, additional territory in its northeast was added from Columbia and Luzerne counties.

== History ==
=== 18th century ===
The lands that constitute present-day Schuylkill County were acquired by William Penn's proprietors in a treaty executed August 22, 1749, with representatives of the Six Nations and the Delaware, Shamokin, and Shawnee tribes, who received 500 pounds in "lawful money of Pennsylvania". The acquired territory described included all of Schuylkill County except the northern part of Union Township, which was included in the purchase of 1768.

In 1744, an early mill was built in the county by John Finscher, but it later burned down.

In 1754, present-day Schuylkill, Berks, Dauphin, Lebanon, and Lehigh counties were settled by German immigrants. The earliest settlers in southeastern Schuylkill County, which was then part of Northampton County, were primarily Moravian Palatines from the Saxony region of Germany.

In 1755, the first log church was built in the county. Native American massacres were commonplace in Schuylkill County between 1755 and 1765. Warrant for tracts of land in the vicinity of McKeansburg were established as early as 1750.

In 1790, anthracite, a highly efficient form of coal then known as stone coal, was discovered near present-day Pottsville by Necho Allen. (Note: In the 1760s, surveyors discovered anthracite coal in the vicinity of Pottsville and Minersville. The survey team was plotting the course of the King's Highway from Reading to Sunbury.)

In 1795, a blacksmith based in Schuylkill County known as Whetstone resolved the question of how to use anthracite successfully for blacksmithing purposes. In 1806, additional sources of coal were found as the tailrace was cut on the Schuylkill River. Daniel Berlin, another blacksmith, used it successfully, and blacksmiths in the county and surrounding Coal Region ultimately adopted its use, which represented a core industry, fuel source, and employment sector in the county throughout the 19th and early 20th centuries.

=== 19th century ===
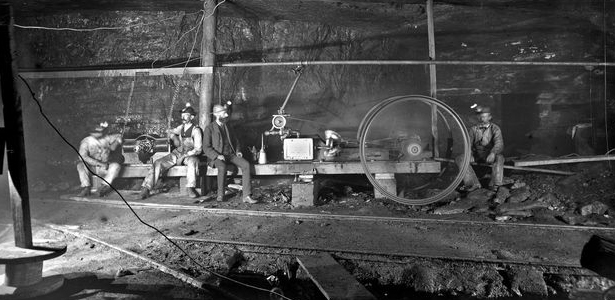
The Bretz, Kohinoor Mine in Shenandoah in 1884

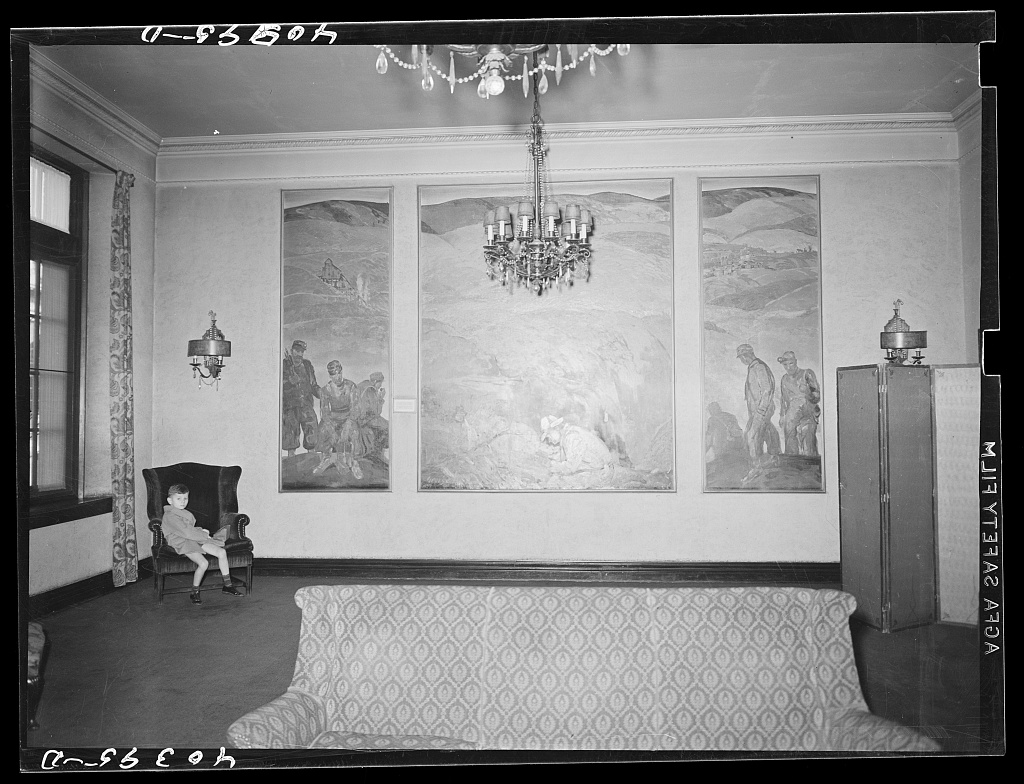
The 1927 George Luks mural at Necho Allen Hotel in Pottsville pays tribute to the region's 19th and early 20th century coal miners.

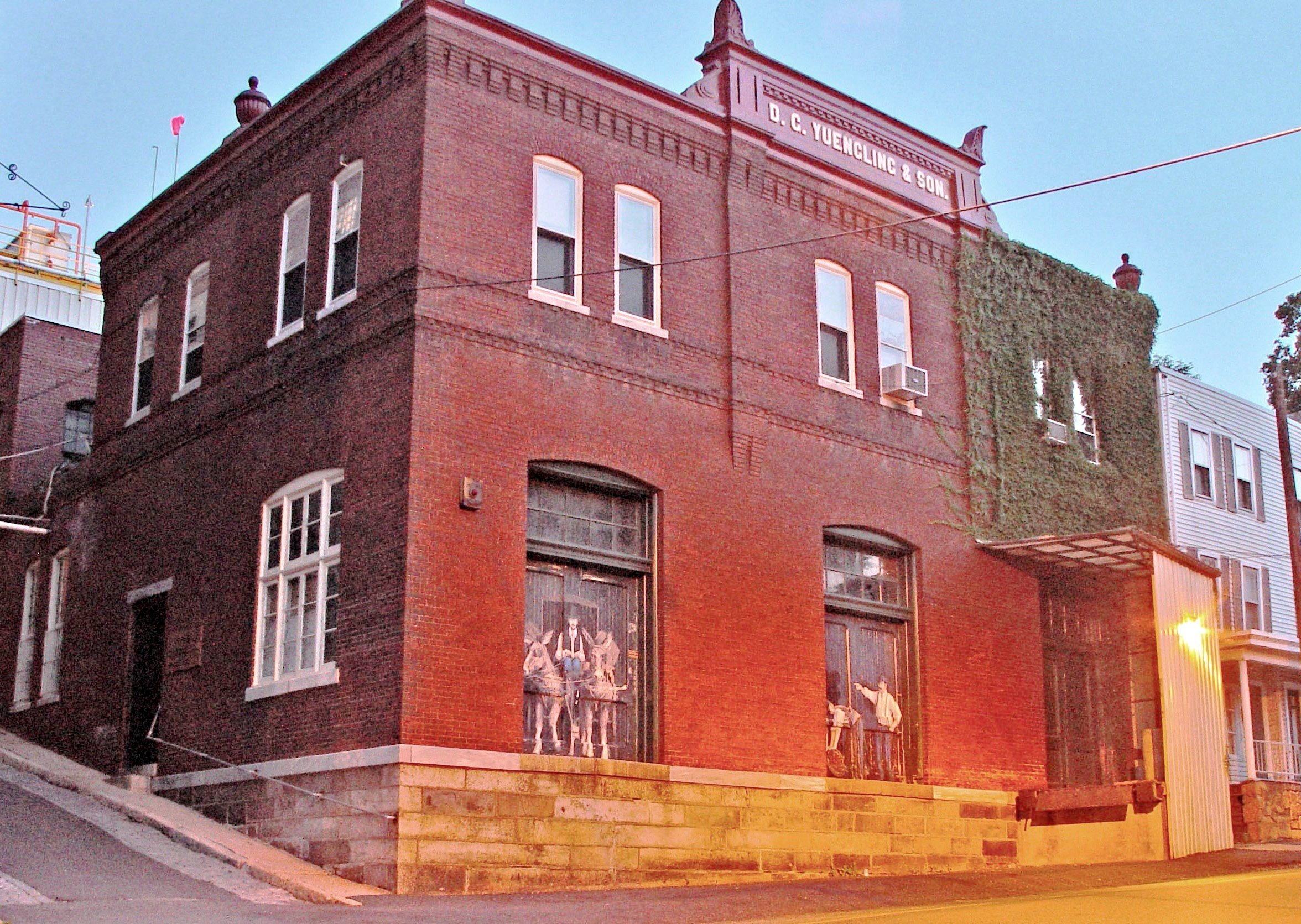
Yuengling brewery in Pottsville in March 2007

Schuylkill County was created via an Act of Assembly on March 1, 1811, from portions of Berks and Northampton counties. More land was added to the county in 1818, from Columbia and Luzerne counties. At the time of its creation, the county had a population of about 6,000.

Orwigsburg was the first organized community in Schuylkill County. During the county's early years, there was an attempt to make McKeansburg the county seat; Orwigsburg was also a contender. Orwigsburg was selected as the county seat because it was deemed to be better suited for industries. Beginning in 1831, support for moving the county seat to Pottsville began gaining traction. In 1846, the state legislature passed an Act that was approved by Governor Francis R. Shunk on March 13, submitting the question to the voters. The change was desired principally because the railroad and canal connections with Orwigsburg were problematic while Pottsville had facilities and was within easy access from all parts of the county.

In 1812, George Shoemaker and Necho Allen discovered stone coal at Centerville in Schuylkill County, and personally delivered some of it to Philadelphia. He gave away most of the coal, intending to encourage individuals to find ways to use it. Most of the experiments failed, and Shoemaker was nearly run out of town and called an imposter but Mellon and Bishop of Delaware County successfully used it in their rolling mill. When other rolling mills also adopted the use of coal as fuel, a large industrial market and demand developed.

The Schuylkill Navigation Company was chartered in 1815 to build a series of navigation improvements in the Schuylkill River during a period when the much larger Erie Canal along the Mohawk River in New York state had already been developed and was well ahead of other key canals fueling the American Industrial Revolution, including the Delaware and Hudson, the Lehigh, the Chesapeake and Ohio, Delaware and Raritan, and Morris canals. The originators of the project did not count upon the coal trade to promote the success of the undertaking. They looked forward mainly to transporting the agricultural products being produced below the mountains, the lumber of Schuylkill County, and the grain and other products of the counties between the Susquehanna and Schuylkill rivers.

In 1822, in the first shipment of coal on the line, 1,480 tons of coal were transported from present-day Schuylkill County.

With a regular supply of anthracite coal ensured, the southern anthracite coal field in Schuylkill County attracted speculators and fortune hunters. They were inspired by dreams of becoming millionaires. This was the first speculative era of the Schuylkill coal trade. Pottsville became the center of the movement. The more successful explorers revealed numerous veins of coal, extending over a vast stretch of county and with a seemingly inexhaustible quantity of coal. These discoveries brought excitement and speculation; lands were bought and sold; roads were laid out in the forest, mines were opened and railroads projected, and innumerable town plots planned. The demand for houses was so great that the lumber for many was framed in Philadelphia and sent by canal to the burgeoning coal region.

At this stage, coal mining firms were predominantly small and family owned. The residents and entrepreneurs of the Schuylkill region opposed the entry here of incorporated coal companies. In these years, coal mining operations in the Schuylkill region were conducted with economy, and relatively little capital was required. As the workings were all above the water level, no machinery was required for water drainage or for hoisting coal to the surface. Coal breakers and other expensive fixtures and appliances for the preparation of coal had not then been introduced. Numerous operators produced from five to six thousand tons for market annually, which was then considered a respectable business, who had never committed thousands of dollars to their enterprises, including their first land purchases of coal mines. Coal land could be bought and mines opened for less capital than the purchase and stocking of a decent farm, and coal mines could be worked for less capital than that required to establish a line of stagecoaches or transportation wagons.

Railroads ultimately replaced the canals as the primary means of transporting coal to markets. Mining was taken over by major corporate business, especially after the Civil War. As a result, the Middle Coal Field was developed in the 1860s and the Philadelphia and Reading Railroad created a subsidiary, Philadelphia and Reading Coal and Iron Company, to buy or lease, and develop the expanding industrial coal trade. Consumption of coal along the Schuylkill above Philadelphia in 1839 was 30,290 tons when Pottsville, the first anthracite furnace in the United States, became operational. By 1849, consumption had increased to 239,290 tons, to 554,774 tons in 1859, and to 1,787,205 tons in 1873.

The numerous jobs in the mining industry comprised a catalyst for mass immigration to Schuylkill County from the British Isles and Europe in the 19th and 20th centuries. As mines became more numerous (by 1846 there were 110 operators in the region and 142 collieries in Schuylkill County) and more complex (in 1846 there were 35 collieries below water level), mechanical breakers, steam locomotive, it became more labor-intensive both for accomplishing mining tasks and supporting mining's peripheral industries. Such industries included manufacturing of explosives, metal screens, pump components, piping, and timber for support. This led to an influx of population into Schuylkill and other anthracite counties to fill these jobs.

Beginning with the Irish immigration in the 1840s, which was fueled by the Great Famine and followed the end of the Civil War, immigrants from Eastern Europe, including Poles, Hungarians, Lithuanians, Slovaks, Rusyns, Ukrainians, and Belarusians (which were usually known as Ruthenians), often from the Austro-Hungarian monarchy, settled in Schuylkill County and labored in the county coal mines. By the 1880s and 1890s, thousands of Italians immigrated to the county in pursuit of mining jobs.

=== 20th century ===
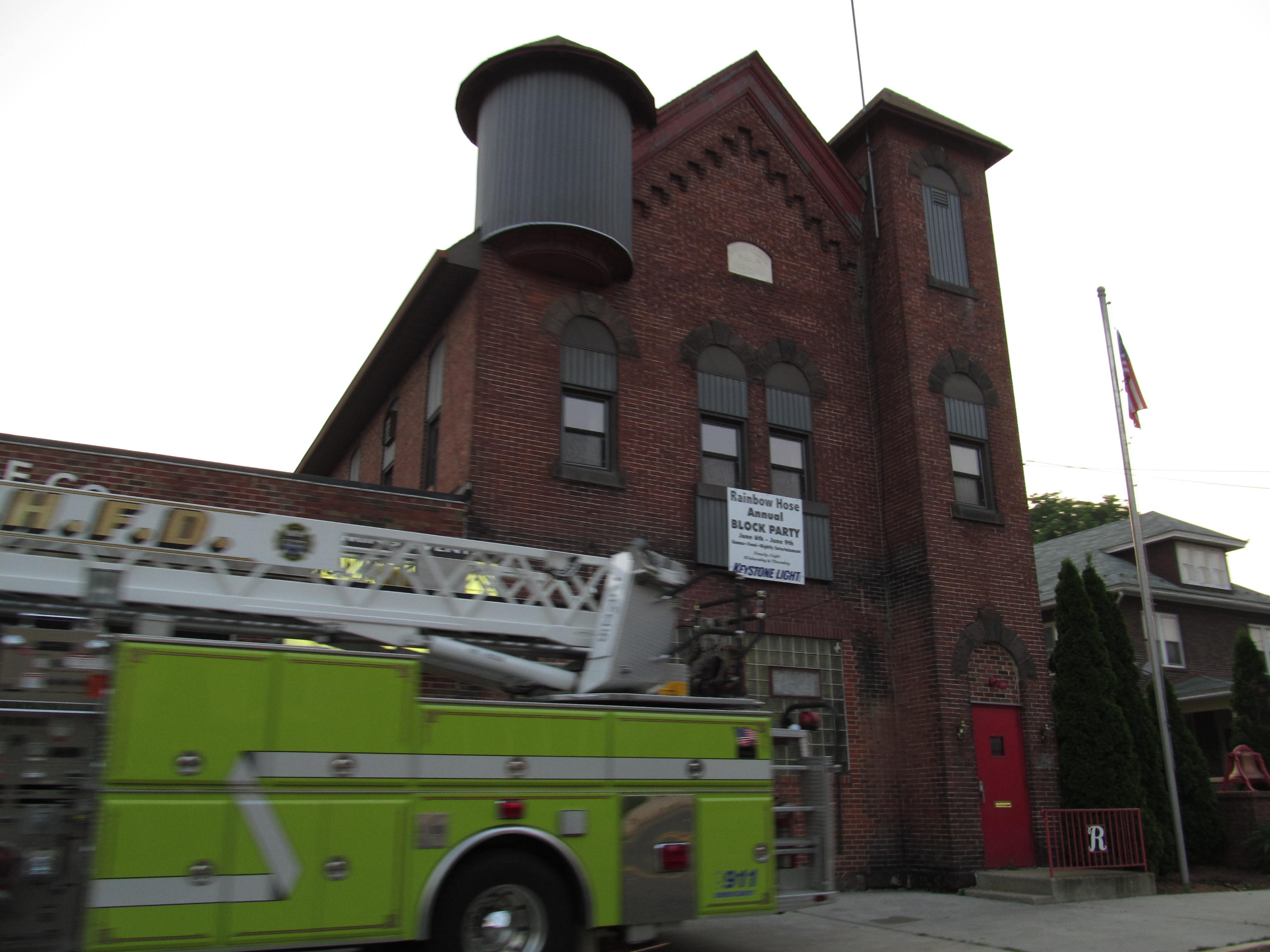
The Schuylkill Haven Fire Company in May 2012

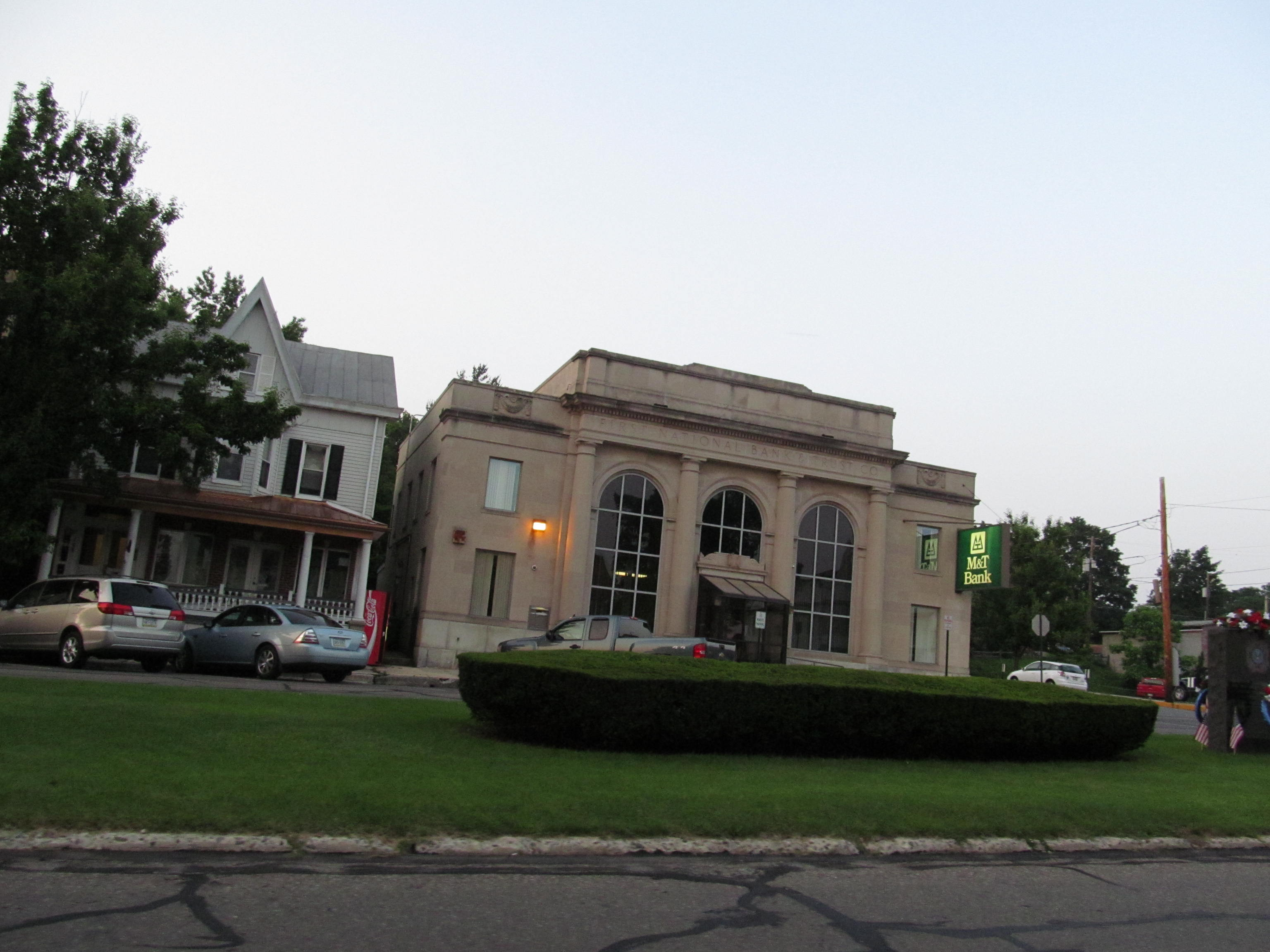
Orwigsburg in May 2012

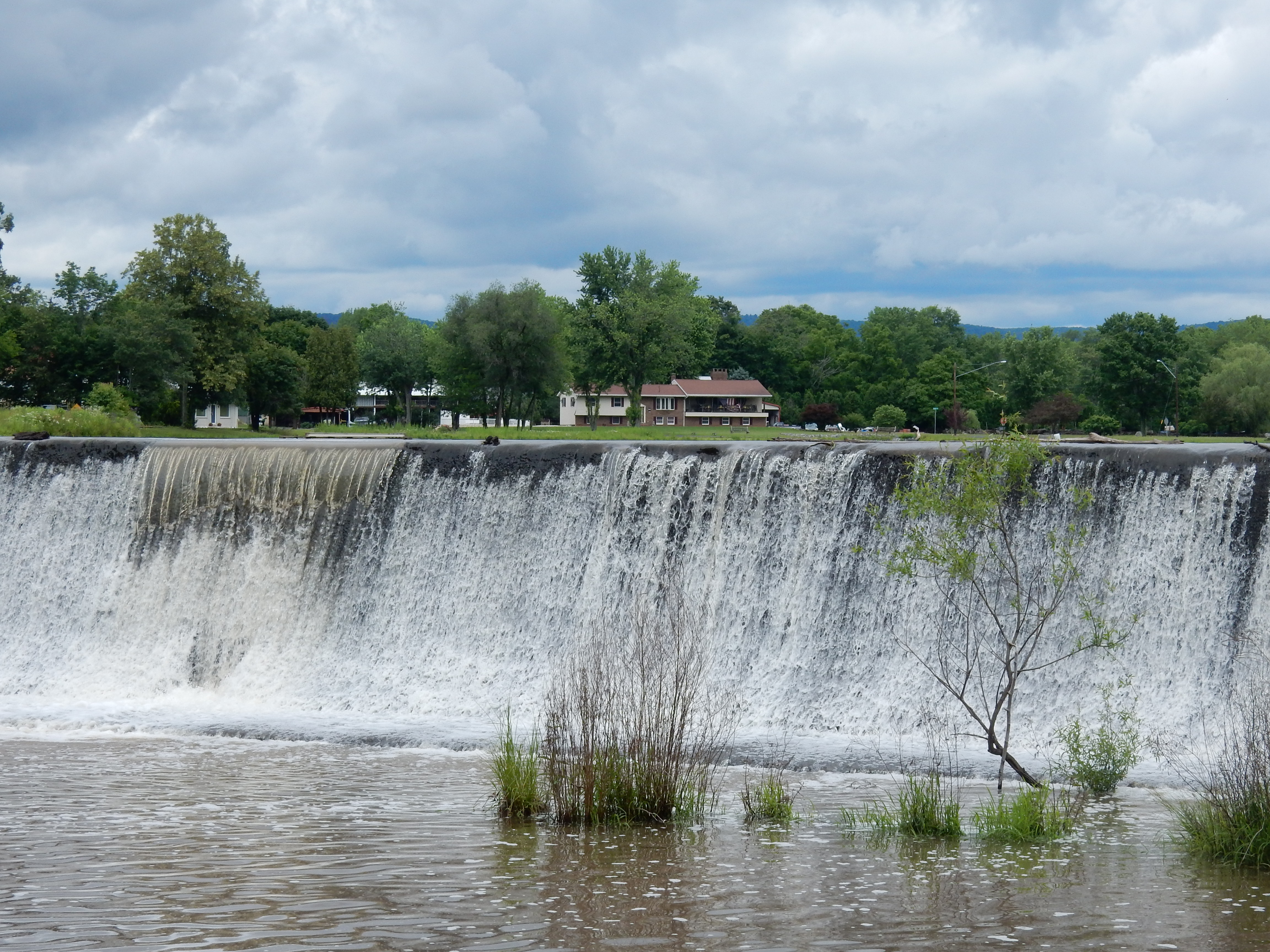
The Deer Lake Dam in June 2012

The anthracite mining industry peaked in production in 1917 and subsequently declined with the exception of periods during World War I and World War II. In the 1950s and 1960s, underground mining operations closed in Schuylkill County and throughout the Coal Region and surface mining became predominate.

On November 5, 1934, the eve of the 1934 United States elections, a parade marched through Kelayres in Kline Township. A crowd of Democratic Party supporters walked toward the home of Republican Party leader Joseph Bruno. Frustration with Bruno family's control of the school board and other local offices had been growing for years. Shots were fired from the Bruno home and yard located at Fourth and Centre Streets. Several people were killed and more than 20 marchers were injured.

Year	Production Net (Tons)	Number of Employees
1950	44,076,703	72,624
1955	26,204,554	33,523
1960	18,817,441	19,051
1965	14,865,955	11,132
2016	1,500,000	952

In 2016, Schuylkill County had six underground mines and 25 surface mines operating, producing 62,000 tons and 833,000 tons of coal, respectively. In 2024, Schuylkill County had four underground mines and 17 surface mines operating, producing 52,000 and 1,624,000 tons of coal, respectively Operators today are re-mining areas of anthracite that were previously mined. It is estimated that 98 percent of the anthracite produced is from existing mines.

== Business and industry ==
=== Farming history ===
Schuylkill County's history is not solely a story about coal mining and railroads. The first settlers were farmers or lumbermen. In the fertile agricultural valleys (not underlain with coal) between the Blue Mountain range in the south to near the Susquehanna River to the north, generations of farming families have helped feed their neighbors in the mines, on the rails, on the canals, and in the towns within and surrounding the county. After settlement of the farms, came a period of diversified, small scale production that lasted until about the late 19th century. After then, more highly mechanized small farms combined livestock and crop production for new, mainly local and regional markets. Then the system re-oriented to add orchard products, trees and plant products and poultry farming.

In 2012, the estimated value of agricultural products in Schuylkill County sold was $165,853,000, ranking 9th in the State and 704th in the US (counties). The county ranks in the top 100 in the US counties for nursery, greenhouse, floriculture, and sod products and cut Christmas trees and short rotation woody crops.

=== Railroad history ===
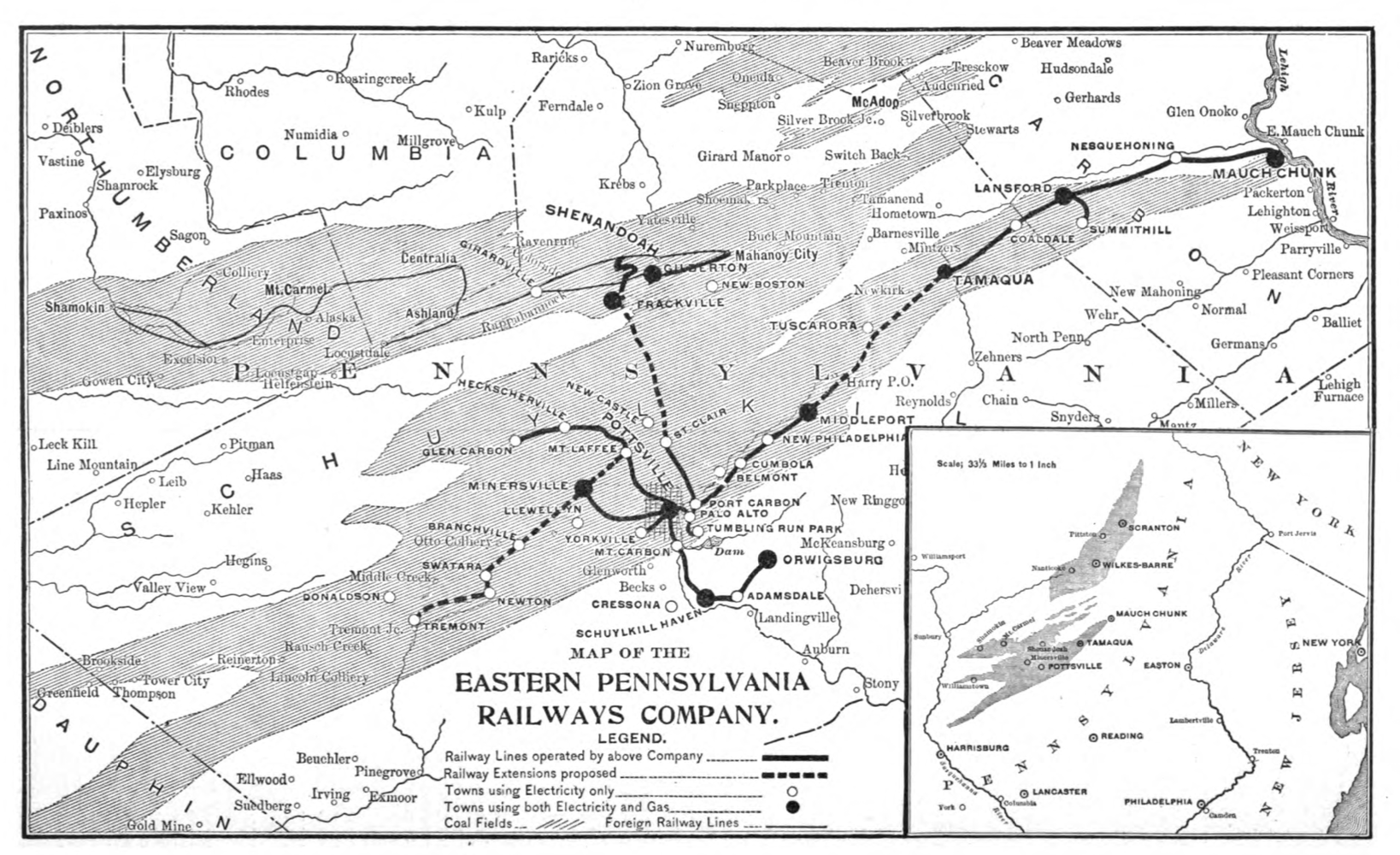
Map of East Penn Railroad's rail lines, c. 1907

In the early 19th century, southern Schuylkill County was served by the Union Canal out of Pine Grove Township with connections west, and the Schuylkill Canal southward from Port Carbon to Philadelphia. Coal mined by the Lehigh Coal & Navigation Company in the Tamaqua and Coaldale areas was often shipped down the Lehigh Canal from Jim Thorpe in neighboring Carbon County. To the north, mountain and ridges were a natural barrier to navigation.

Other means were required to transport coal out of the rich basin of the Mahanoy Valley. Several railroads were founded in the late 1820s and early 1830s north of the Schuylkill Canal to enable the transport of coal to the canal terminus in Philadelphia and other markets, including:

- Little Schuylkill Railroad, from Port Clinton to Tamaqua, twenty miles in length.
- Mill Creek Railroad, from Port Carbon up the valley of Mill Creek four miles, with about three miles of branch roads intersecting it. This was the first road completed and was in operation part of the year 1829.
- Mine Hill and Schuylkill Haven Railroad, commencing at Schuylkill Haven to Minersville having a length, including the west branch, of fifteen miles. There were also about five miles of branches intersecting it.
- Mount Carbon Railroad, commencing at Mount Carbon and extending up the east and west branches of the Norwegian Creek; a length of road seven miles.
- Schuylkill Valley Railroad, commencing at Port Carbon to Tuscarora, a distance of ten miles, with fifteen branches intersecting it, the distances combined amounting to another ten miles.

Mine Hill and Schuylkill Haven Railroad served the Schuylkill Canal. Chartered in 1831, tracks were laid from the flats in Schuylkill Haven along the river through Cressona and Minersville to Tremont. The railroad eventually reached Ashland and Locust Gap via the Gordon Planes.

Construction on the Little Schuylkill Railroad began in 1829. It ran from Port Clinton northward to Mahanoy Junction above Tamaqua. It would become the keystone of the Philadelphia and Reading system, serving as a gauntlet for its eastern and western branches. Connecting with it were four important lines. The 146 miles (235 km) Catawissa Railroad operated from Mahanoy Junction to West Milton, providing access to the Mahanoy region by joining the northern terminus of the Little Schuylkill with connections to New York City, Scranton and also points west. At Port Clinton, it connected with the P&R's main line from Mount Carbon. Its most important connection would be with the Mahanoy and Broad Mountain Railway via Mahanoy Tunnel and East Mahanoy Railroad.

There was once over 1,000 miles (1,600 km) of railroad track in Schuylkill County. At one point in the 19th century, the largest railyard and roundhouse in the world was located at Mill Creek between Pottsville and St. Clair.

=== Renewable energy ===
Since the early 21st century, Schuylkill County has decreased its use of coal power and become a major producer of renewable energy. Twenty-five percent of the county's electrical production currently comes from renewable energy sources. Wind power is the largest producer, accounting for 80% of the renewable energy output, while solar and biomass account for 20%.

The Locust Ridge wind turbines in the north of the county produce enough electricity for 37,500 homes, equivalent to the 48 MW of electricity generated by the Wheelabrator Frackville's waste coal plant.

=== Textile industry history ===
Textile manufacturing evolved as a major industry in the county near the beginning of the 20th Century. Phillips & Jones Co., Now known as Phillips Van Heusen, began in Pottsville, and was once Schuylkill County's largest employer. Another textile giant, John E. Morgan Knitting Mills, began manufacturing in 1945 in Tamaqua, eventually becoming the largest employer in the county in the between 1970 and 1980. In addition there were numerous smaller shops all over the county, doing subcontract work for major manufacturers all over the nation.

In the latter half of the 20th century, the textile industry, which employed significant numbers of women, began to rival the coal mining industry in size, especially after the end of World War II, when that industry began to collapse. As a consequence of the Great Depression, garment manufacturers began to look for people willing to work at lower wages outside of New York City, the center of the industry. Pennsylvania became the third-highest ranked apparel manufacturer in the United States by 1940. Women's clothing became the state's fastest growing product.

The dominance of the industry in Schuylkill County lasted until the last decade of the 20th century, when it was clear that the garment manufacturing industry was leaving Schuylkill County and other regions of the U.S. and moving to foreign countries. By 2011, only six manufacturers employing 341 people remained in the county.

== Geography ==
According to the U.S. Census Bureau, the county has a total area of 783 square miles (2,030 km^{2}), of which 779 square miles (2,020 km^{2}) is land and 4.2 square miles (11 km^{2}) (0.5%) is water.

The Schuylkill River headwaters are found in the county, starting in the Appalachian Mountains, and flows through many towns and the city of Reading, Pennsylvania, to Philadelphia where it flows into the Delaware River. The Schuylkill drains the majority of the county while some western and northern areas of the county are drained by the Susquehanna River. The Swatara Creek, Wiconisco Creek, Mahantango Creek, Mahanoy Creek, and Catawissa Creek all start in Schuylkill County and are tributaries of the Susquehanna. Areas of the eastern portion of the county drain into the Lehigh River via the Quakake Creek, Nesquehoning Creek, Mahoning Creek, and Lizard Creek, all of which also start in the county. To the south, southern Schuylkill county is home to Blue Mountain and the Appalachian Trail. Broad Mountain crosses the county from northeast to southwest.

Schuylkill County is located in northeastern Pennsylvania's Coal Region. It is located just north of the Lehigh Valley and Reading metropolitan areas. Portions of eastern Schuylkill County around Tamaqua are located in the Pocono Mountains. As a result, like other portions of the Poconos, eastern Schuylkill has experienced an influx of people from New York City and New Jersey who commute into Manhattan each day. The commute can take up to two hours each way due to distance and traffic. Far western areas of the county are located near Harrisburg and are sometimes considered to be located in South Central Pennsylvania.

=== Climate ===
The county has a humid continental climate (Dfa/Dfb) with four distinct seasons. The hardiness zone is 6b in most of the county, 7a in lowlands of the south-central and SW areas of the county and upriver to Pottsville and Minersville, and 6a in small higher northern areas. Average monthly temperatures in the vicinity of downtown Pottsville range from 27.3 °F in January to 72.3 °F in July, while in Mahanoy City they range from 24.3 °F in January to 69.3 °F in July.

=== Adjacent counties ===
- Columbia County (northwest)
- Luzerne County (north)
- Carbon County (northeast)
- Lehigh County (southeast)
- Berks County (south)
- Lebanon County (southwest)
- Dauphin County (southwest)
- Northumberland County (northwest)

Interstates, US Routes, and State Routes

- I-81
- US 209
- PA 25
- PA 54
- PA 61
- PA 125
- PA 183
- PA 309
- PA 325
- PA 339
- PA 443
- PA 501
- PA 895
- PA 901
- PA 924

== Demographics ==
Historical population
Census	Pop.	Note	%±
1820	11,339		—
1830	20,744		82.9%
1840	29,053		40.1%
1850	60,713		109.0%
1860	89,510		47.4%
1870	116,428		30.1%
1880	129,974		11.6%
1890	154,163		18.6%
1900	172,927		12.2%
1910	207,894		20.2%
1920	217,754		4.7%
1930	235,505		8.2%
1940	228,331		−3.0%
1950	200,577		−12.2%
1960	173,027		−13.7%
1970	160,089		−7.5%
1980	160,630		0.3%
1990	152,585		−5.0%
2000	150,336		−1.5%
2010	148,289		−1.4%
2020	143,049		−3.5%
2025 (est.)	145,085	▲	1.4%
U.S. Decennial Census; 1790–1960 1900–1990; 1990–2000 2010–2019

=== Racial and ethnic composition ===
Schuylkill County, Pennsylvania – Racial and ethnic composition Note: the US Census treats Hispanic/Latino as an ethnic category. This table excludes Latinos from the racial categories and assigns them to a separate category. Hispanics/Latinos may be of any race.
Race / Ethnicity (NH = Non-Hispanic)	Pop 1980	Pop 1990	Pop 2000	Pop 2010	Pop 2020	% 1980	% 1990	% 2000	% 2010	% 2020
White alone (NH)	159,364	150,486	144,290	138,248	126,192	99.21%	98.62%	95.98%	93.23%	88.22%
Black or African American alone (NH)	286	805	3,049	3,841	4,115	0.18%	0.53%	2.03%	2.59%	2.88%
Native American or Alaska Native alone (NH)	71	103	97	162	155	0.04%	0.07%	0.06%	0.11%	0.11%
Asian alone (NH)	318	491	622	703	748	0.20%	0.32%	0.41%	0.47%	0.52%
Native Hawaiian or Pacific Islander alone (NH)	x	x	18	24	13	x	x	0.01%	0.02%	0.01%
Other race alone (NH)	111	23	46	60	287	0.07%	0.02%	0.03%	0.04%	0.20%
Mixed race or Multiracial (NH)	x	x	543	1,171	3,475	x	x	0.36%	0.79%	2.43%
Hispanic or Latino (any race)	480	677	1,671	4,080	8,064	0.30%	0.44%	1.11%	2.75%	5.64%
Total	160,630	152,585	150,336	148,289	143,049	100.00%	100.00%	100.00%	100.00%	100.00%

=== 2020 census ===
As of the 2020 census, the county had a population of 143,049. The median age was 45.6 years. 19.0% of residents were under the age of 18 and 21.8% of residents were 65 years of age or older. For every 100 females there were 105.0 males, and for every 100 females age 18 and over there were 104.3 males age 18 and over.

The racial makeup of the county was 89.6% White, 3.1% Black or African American, 0.2% American Indian and Alaska Native, 0.5% Asian, <0.1% Native Hawaiian and Pacific Islander, 2.6% from some other race, and 4.0% from two or more races. Hispanic or Latino residents of any race comprised 5.6% of the population.

52.9% of residents lived in urban areas, while 47.1% lived in rural areas.

There were 57,950 households in the county, of which 25.2% had children under the age of 18 living in them. Of all households, 45.0% were married-couple households, 20.5% were households with a male householder and no spouse or partner present, and 26.3% were households with a female householder and no spouse or partner present. About 30.7% of all households were made up of individuals and 15.4% had someone living alone who was 65 years of age or older.

There were 67,128 housing units, of which 13.7% were vacant. Among occupied housing units, 74.8% were owner-occupied and 25.2% were renter-occupied. The homeowner vacancy rate was 2.0% and the rental vacancy rate was 9.0%.

== Micropolitan statistical area ==
The U.S. Office of Management and Budget has designated Schuylkill County as the Pottsville, PA micropolitan statistical area (μSA). As of the 2010 U.S. census the micropolitan area ranked the number 1 most populous in the State of Pennsylvania and the 5th most populous in the United States with a population of 148,289.

== Culture ==
A 2005 ethnic heritage study produced for the Schuylkill River National and State Heritage Area, based on recorded interviews with more than seventy residents, documented living traditions among eighteen ethnic and religious communities in the county, from the Pennsylvania Dutch, its largest ethnic group, to the Irish, Welsh, Cornish, Italian, Polish, Slovak, Lithuanian, Ukrainian, Carpatho-Rusyn, Jewish and Greek communities and more recent Latin American and Indian arrivals. Eastern European dishes such as bleenies (potato pancakes), pierogies, halushki, halupki and kielbasy are sold year-round at churches in the northern part of the county and at borough heritage days, and are what county residents generally mean by "ethnic food". Annual ethnic festivals include Lithuanian Days, held each August, the Irish Weekend in Heckscherville, and Ukrainian Seminary Day at Primrose. The study observed that the county's Greek families, whose numbers had declined, generally ran hot dog counters rather than restaurants serving their native cuisine. It also recorded boilo, a hot whiskey drink sweetened with honey and spices and made to closely held family recipes, as a tradition shared across the county's ethnic groups.

== Law and government ==
Schuylkill County Sheriff's Department
- Abbreviation: SCSD

Jurisdictional structure
- Operations jurisdiction: Schuylkill, Pennsylvania, USA
- Map of Schuylkill County Sheriff's Department's jurisdiction
- Area: 778 square miles (2,000 km^{2})
- Population: 150,336(est.)

Operational structure
- Headquarters: Pottsville, Pennsylvania
- Police Officers: 12
- Elected officer responsible: Joseph G. Groody, Sheriff
- Agency executive: Brian Tobin, Chief Deputy

Website
- Schuylkill Sheriff Webpage

The Schuylkill County Sheriff's Department consists of the Sheriff's Office and operates the Central Booking unit. The Sheriff's Office is composed of a Civil and Criminal Division. The Civil Division processes real estate and property paperwork, as well as issue firearms permits. The Criminal Division is responsible for the security of the courthouses, as well as the transportation of prisoners to and from court hearings and to other correctional facilities. The Sheriff's Department is also responsible for detecting and interdicting weapons before they can enter the courthouse and making criminal arrests of persons when weapons are found. The Sheriff's Department provides all facets of security for the County courthouse and makes arrests inside the courthouse for various offenses including possession of weapons and controlled substances as well as the arrest of disorderly persons and other violations of the Pennsylvania Crimes Code Title 18. All Deputy Sheriffs are sworn law enforcement officers who must attend the state Sheriff Academy in State College to be certified as a Deputy Sheriff. The Sheriff Academy is a paramilitary Sheriff academy that consists of 6 months of intense training in all facets of criminal and civil law of Pennsylvania as well as physical training, self defense training, weapons certification and training, as well as tactical training, training in handcuffing and restraint, courtroom and courthouse security, and conducting security assessments of Courthouse and courtroom facilities. Central Booking processes fingerprints and photographs of arrested individuals. When requested by other police agencies, the Sheriff's Department performs patrol duties in various communities within Schuylkill county and provides support to other Police agencies during major incidents, search warrant executions, arrest warrant operations, special events and in various other capacities.

=== Politics ===
United States presidential election results for Schuylkill County, Pennsylvania
Year	Republican		Democratic		Third party(ies)	
Year	No.	%	No.	%	No.	%
1880	9,337	40.01%	11,511	49.32%	2,491	10.67%
1884	11,272	46.87%	11,200	46.58%	1,575	6.55%
1888	12,522	48.20%	13,054	50.25%	404	1.56%
1892	11,426	44.94%	13,677	53.80%	321	1.26%
1896	17,045	52.60%	14,745	45.50%	617	1.90%
1900	15,327	50.73%	14,496	47.98%	392	1.30%
1904	21,046	65.10%	10,115	31.29%	1,167	3.61%
1908	18,758	52.57%	15,481	43.39%	1,440	4.04%
1912	3,557	11.09%	11,812	36.83%	16,706	52.08%
1916	17,806	55.03%	13,396	41.40%	1,155	3.57%
1920	30,259	59.46%	18,746	36.84%	1,882	3.70%
1924	34,578	64.44%	10,111	18.84%	8,967	16.71%
1928	46,033	53.05%	40,424	46.59%	311	0.36%
1932	32,492	46.88%	35,023	50.53%	1,790	2.58%
1936	44,353	43.95%	55,183	54.68%	1,385	1.37%
1940	43,505	47.05%	48,739	52.71%	231	0.25%
1944	40,671	53.00%	35,852	46.72%	221	0.29%
1948	44,176	60.11%	28,194	38.36%	1,122	1.53%
1952	51,437	59.39%	34,987	40.40%	186	0.21%
1956	51,670	61.95%	31,645	37.94%	91	0.11%
1960	44,187	49.82%	44,430	50.10%	70	0.08%
1964	26,386	34.25%	50,560	65.63%	96	0.12%
1968	37,194	48.53%	34,982	45.64%	4,469	5.83%
1972	44,071	61.56%	26,077	36.42%	1,447	2.02%
1976	31,944	47.71%	33,905	50.64%	1,099	1.64%
1980	36,273	55.83%	24,968	38.43%	3,728	5.74%
1984	37,330	58.96%	25,758	40.68%	224	0.35%
1988	32,666	56.47%	24,797	42.87%	379	0.66%
1992	25,780	40.90%	23,679	37.57%	13,570	21.53%
1996	22,920	40.47%	24,860	43.90%	8,849	15.63%
2000	29,841	51.19%	26,215	44.97%	2,244	3.85%
2004	35,640	54.60%	29,231	44.79%	398	0.61%
2008	33,767	53.09%	28,300	44.49%	1,538	2.42%
2012	32,278	55.61%	24,546	42.29%	1,224	2.11%
2016	44,001	69.42%	16,770	26.46%	2,614	4.12%
2020	48,871	69.07%	20,727	29.29%	1,157	1.64%
2024	51,665	70.43%	20,882	28.46%	814	1.11%

United States Senate election results for Schuylkill County, Pennsylvania1
Year	Republican		Democratic		Third party(ies)	
Year	No.	%	No.	%	No.	%
1994	25,160	50.45%	22,045	44.20%	2,665	5.34%
2000	34,175	59.92%	21,184	37.14%	1,679	2.94%
2006	21,510	45.75%	25,508	54.25%	0	0.00%
2012	31,625	55.03%	24,639	42.87%	1,204	2.10%
2018	30,452	62.35%	17,691	36.22%	699	1.43%
2024	48,553	66.66%	22,224	30.51%	2,063	2.83%

United States Senate election results for Schuylkill County, Pennsylvania3
Year	Republican		Democratic		Third party(ies)	
Year	No.	%	No.	%	No.	%
1992	32,493	52.07%	27,188	43.57%	2,720	4.36%
1998	29,098	65.71%	13,855	31.29%	1,328	3.00%
2004	39,038	61.69%	21,164	33.44%	3,080	4.87%
2010	26,348	58.91%	18,378	41.09%	0	0.00%
2016	37,757	60.77%	19,539	31.45%	4,832	7.78%
2022	35,293	63.69%	17,954	32.40%	2,166	3.91%

Pennsylvania Gubernatorial election results for Schuylkill County
Year	Republican		Democratic		Third party(ies)	
Year	No.	%	No.	%	No.	%
1970	26,925	41.26%	36,496	55.93%	1,834	2.81%
1974	26,606	46.04%	30,174	52.22%	1,005	1.74%
1978	33,407	57.76%	24,183	41.81%	245	0.42%
1982	22,527	40.58%	32,706	58.92%	279	0.50%
1986	23,824	47.52%	25,854	51.57%	459	0.92%
1990	12,591	29.68%	29,832	70.32%	0	0.00%
1994	24,714	49.25%	19,148	38.16%	6,318	12.59%
1998	27,992	63.14%	12,108	27.31%	4,233	9.55%
2002	22,692	46.29%	25,233	51.47%	1,100	2.24%
2006	20,886	44.24%	26,327	55.76%	0	0.00%
2010	28,659	63.41%	16,535	36.59%	0	0.00%
2014	17,168	45.52%	20,544	54.48%	0	0.00%
2018	26,640	54.68%	21,179	43.47%	899	1.85%
2022	33,008	59.54%	21,203	38.25%	1,224	2.21%

As of November 2008, there were 94,110 registered voters in Schuylkill County.

- Republican: 45,054 (47.87%)
- Democratic: 40,092 (42.60%)
- Other Parties: 8,964 (9.53%)

As of January 2023, there were 88,642 registered voters in Schuylkill County.

- Republican: 49,025 (55.31%)
- Democratic: 27,924 (31.50%)
- Independent: 7,508 (8.47%)
- Third Party: 4,185 (4.72%)

While the Republican Party has been historically dominant in Schuylkill County politics, Democrats became dominant at the county level after the 2007 elections. John McCain received 53.6% of the vote to 44.9% for Barack Obama in November 2008. In the state row offices of the same election, each statewide winner carried the county. In 2006 Democrat Tim Seip won the heavily Republican 125th House district and Bob Casey Jr. carried Schuylkill when he unseated incumbent Republican US Senator Rick Santorum. For many years, the county was represented in the United States House of Representatives by conservative Democrat Tim Holden of St. Clair. Former State Representative Dave Argall won the special election of March 3 to succeed the late State Senator Jim Rhoades and was sworn in on March 17. Jerry Knowles won the special election for Argall's seat in the 124th House district on May 19. In 2010, the GOP regained ground when Seip was defeated for reelection by Republican Mike Tobash. In 2011, the GOP reclaimed the county government.

This GOP resurgence has been followed by the subsequent election of Donald Trump in 2016, where he received 69% of the area's popular vote to Hillary Clinton's 26.7%. Trump received the highest percentage of the vote of any Republican presidential candidate in the county's history. He subsequently received 70.6% of the vote in his triumph in 2024, making it the best performance for a Republican in the county in presidential history, and the first Republican presidential candidate to crack 70% of the vote in the county.

=== Pennsylvania House of Representatives ===
- Tim Twardzik, Republican, 123rd district
- Jamie Barton, Republican, 124th district
- Joseph Kerwin, Republican, 125th district

=== Pennsylvania Senate ===
- Dave Argall, Republican, 29th district

=== United States House of Representatives ===
- Dan Meuser, Republican, 9th district

=== United States Senate ===
- John Fetterman, Democrat
- Dave McCormick, Republican

== Education ==
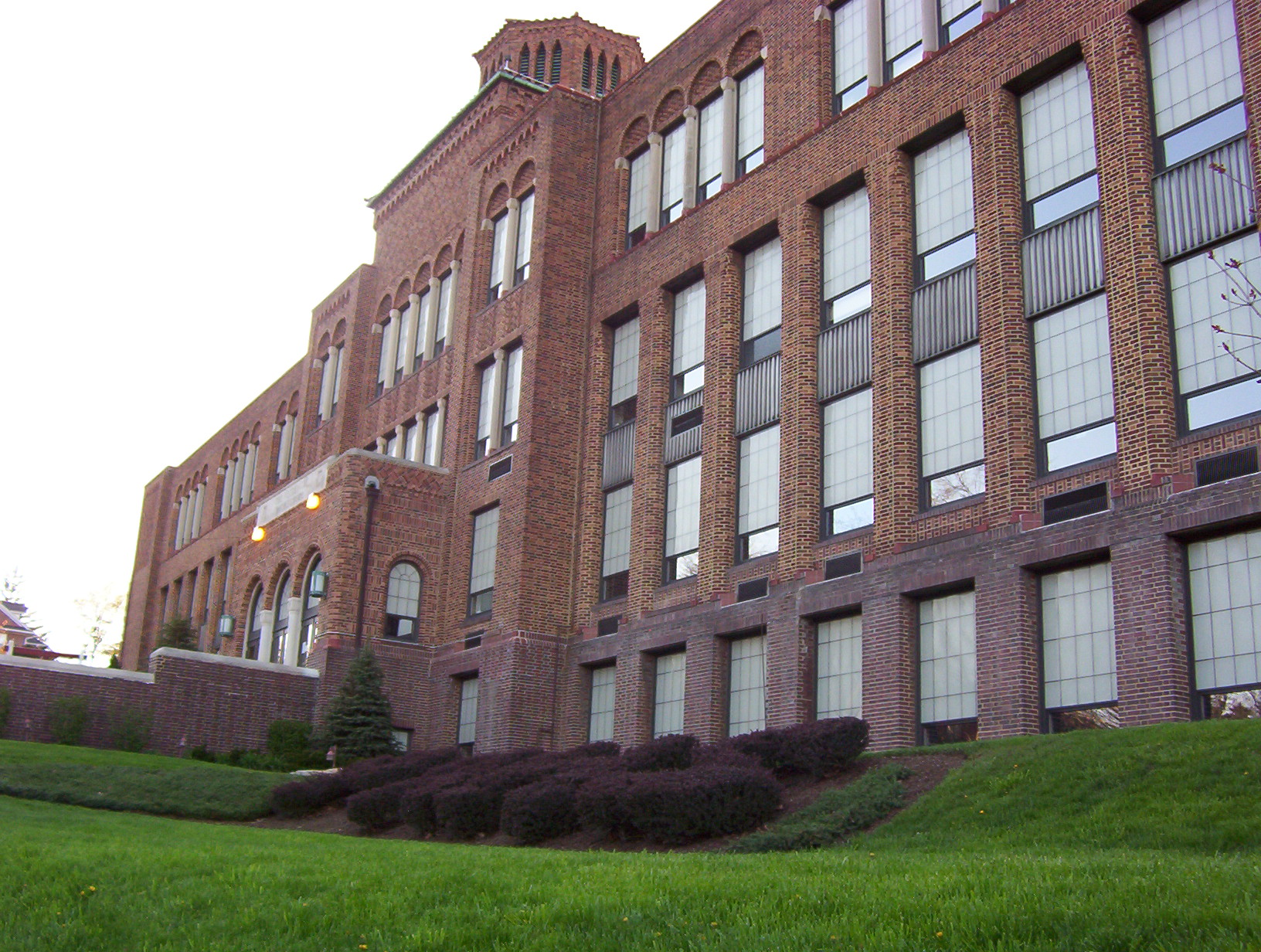
Pottsville Area High School in Pottsville

=== Colleges and universities ===
- Alvernia University in Pottsville
- Lehigh Carbon Community College (Morgan Center Campus) in Tamaqua
- Penn State Schuylkill in Schuylkill Haven

=== Public school districts ===
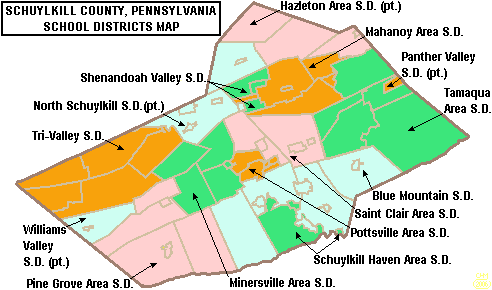
Map of Schuylkill County public school districts

School districts include:

- Blue Mountain School District
- Hazleton Area School District (also in Luzerne and Carbon Counties)
- Mahanoy Area School District
- Minersville Area School District
- North Schuylkill School District (also in Columbia County)
- Panther Valley School District (also in Carbon County)
- Pine Grove Area School District
- Pottsville Area School District
- Saint Clair Area School District
- Schuylkill Haven Area School District
- Shenandoah Valley School District
- Tamaqua Area School District
- Tri-Valley School District
- Williams Valley School District (also in Dauphin County)

== Communities ==
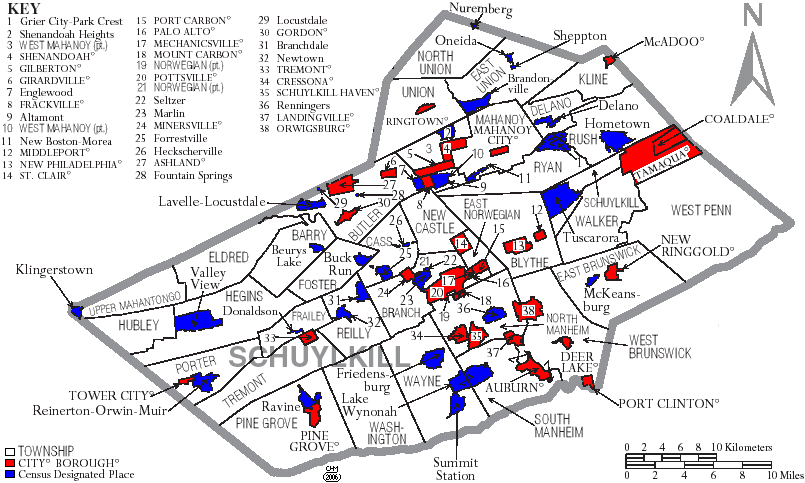
Map of Schuylkill County with municipal labels showing cities and boroughs (red), townships (white), and census-designated places (blue)

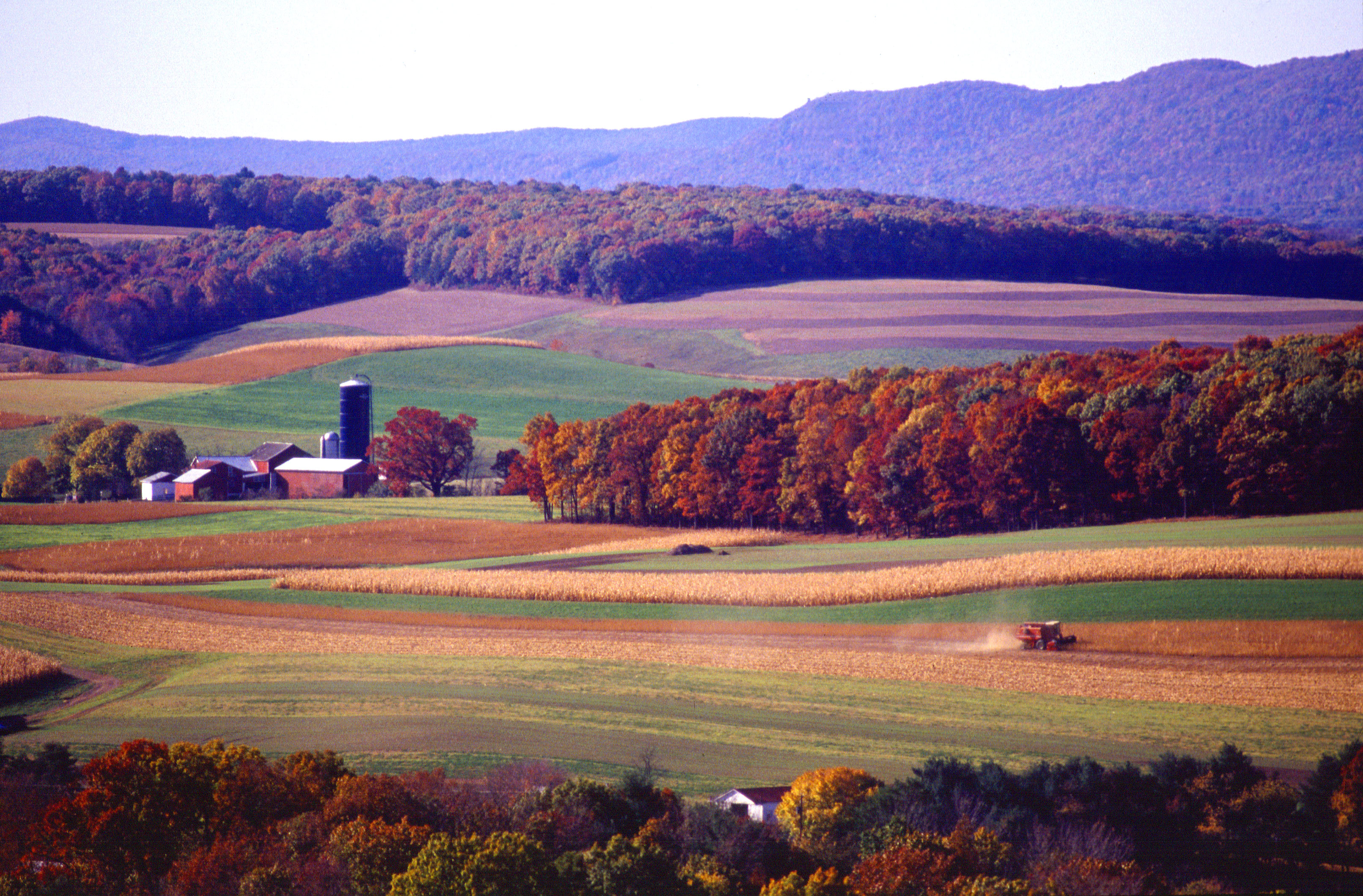
Farming near Klingerstown

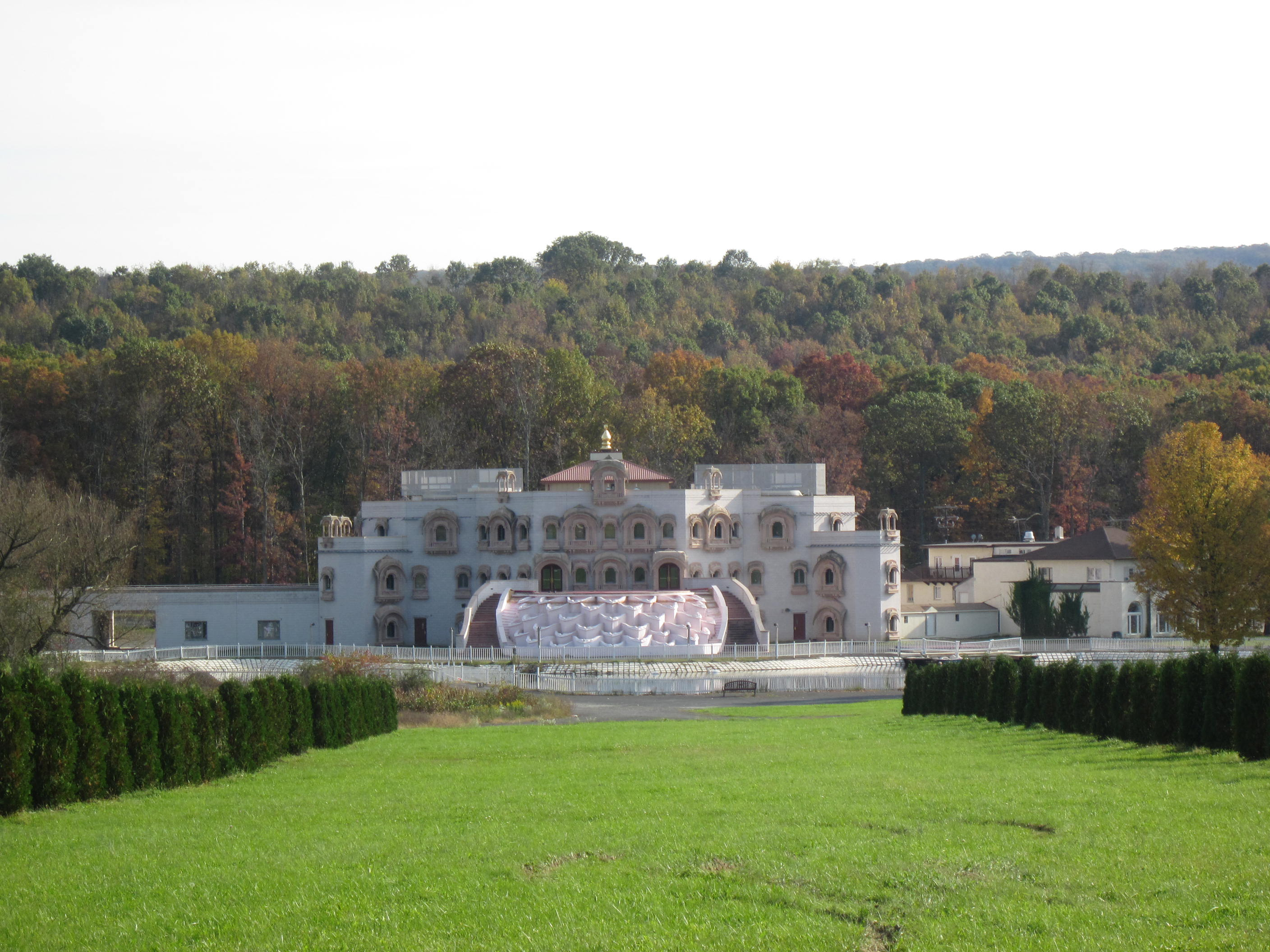
Vraj Hindu Temple in Schuylkill Haven

Under Pennsylvania law, there are four types of incorporated municipalities: cities, boroughs, townships, and, in at most two cases, towns. The following cities, boroughs and townships are located in Schuylkill County:

=== City ===
- Pottsville (county seat)

=== Boroughs ===
- Ashland (partly in Columbia County)
- Auburn
- Coaldale
- Cressona
- Deer Lake
- Frackville
- Gilberton
- Girardville
- Gordon
- Landingville
- Mahanoy City
- McAdoo
- Mechanicsville
- Middleport
- Minersville
- Mount Carbon
- New Philadelphia
- New Ringgold
- Orwigsburg
- Palo Alto
- Pine Grove
- Port Carbon
- Port Clinton
- Ringtown
- Schuylkill Haven
- Shenandoah
- St. Clair
- Tamaqua
- Tower City
- Tremont

=== Townships ===
- Barry
- Blythe
- Branch
- Butler
- Cass
- Delano
- East Brunswick
- East Norwegian
- East Union
- Eldred
- Foster
- Frailey
- Hegins
- Hubley
- Kline
- Mahanoy
- New Castle
- North Manheim
- North Union
- Norwegian
- Pine Grove
- Porter
- Reilly
- Rush
- Ryan
- Schuylkill
- South Manheim
- Tremont
- Union
- Upper Mahantongo
- Walker
- Washington
- Wayne
- West Brunswick
- West Mahanoy
- West Penn

=== Census-designated places ===
Census-designated places are unincorporated communities designated by the U.S. Census Bureau for the purposes of compiling demographic data. They are not actual jurisdictions under Pennsylvania law.

- Altamont
- Beurys Lake
- Branchdale
- Brandonville
- Buck Run
- Cumbola
- Delano
- Donaldson
- Duncott
- Englewood
- Forestville
- Fountain Springs
- Friedensburg
- Grier City
- Heckscherville
- Hegins
- Hometown
- Kelayres
- Klingerstown
- Lake Wynonah
- Lavelle
- Locustdale
- Marlin
- McKeansburg
- Morea
- Muir
- New Boston
- Newtown
- Nuremberg
- Oneida
- Orwin
- Park Crest
- Ravine
- Reinerton
- Renningers
- Seltzer
- Shenandoah Heights
- Sheppton
- Summit Station
- Tuscarora
- Valley View

=== Other unincorporated communities ===
- Adamsdale
- Aucheys
- Andreas
- Barnesville
- Bear Run
- Beuchler
- Blackwood (ghost town)
- Bowmans
- Boston Run
- Brockton
- Brommerstown
- Brookside
- Buck Mountain
- Clamtown
- Connerton
- Craigs
- Cressonville (ghost town)
- Drehersville
- Deturksville
- Ellen Gowan
- Exmoor
- Fearnot
- Frisbie
- Fountain
- Ginthers
- Glen Carbon
- Good Spring
- Haddock
- Hauto
- Hecla
- Hills Terrace
- Irving
- Joliett
- Kepners
- Leibeyville
- Llewellyn
- Locust Valley
- Lofty
- Lorberry
- Mabel
- Mahoning Valley
- Mantzville
- Maple Hill
- Marstown
- Mary D
- Molino
- Moyers
- New Mines (located within Branchdale)
- Newkirk
- North Pine Grove
- Orwin
- Outwood
- Owl Creek
- Park Place
- Pitman
- Pleasant Valley
- Quakake
- Rauschs
- Reedsville
- Reevesdale
- Rene Mont
- Roedersville
- Rough and Ready
- Sacramento
- Seek
- Sheridan
- Shoemakers
- Snyders
- Silverton (ghost town)
- South Tamaqua
- Spring Glen
- St. Nicholas
- Stanhope
- Steins
- Still Creek
- Stonemont
- Suedberg
- Tamanend
- Trenton
- Vulcan
- Weishample
- Yatesville
- Zenners
- Zion Grove

=== Population ranking ===
The population ranking of the following table is based on the 2010 census of Schuylkill County.

† county seat

Rank	City/Town/etc.	Municipal type	Population (2010 Census)
1	† Pottsville	City	14,324
2	Tamaqua	Borough	7,107
3	Schuylkill Haven	Borough	5,437
4	Shenandoah	Borough	5,071
5	Minersville	Borough	4,397
6	Mahanoy City	Borough	4,162
7	Frackville	Borough	3,805
8	Orwigsburg	Borough	3,099
9	St. Clair	Borough	3,004
10	Ashland (partially in Columbia County)	Borough	2,817
11	Lake Wynonah	CDP	2,640
12	McAdoo	Borough	2,300
13	Coaldale	Borough	2,281
14	Pine Grove	Borough	2,186
15	Port Carbon	Borough	1,889
16	Tremont	Borough	1,752
17	Valley View	CDP	1,683
18	Cressona	Borough	1,651
19	Girardville	Borough	1,519
20	Hometown	CDP	1,349
21	Tower City	Borough	1,346
22	Shenandoah Heights	CDP	1,233
23	New Philadelphia	Borough	1,085
24	Palo Alto	Borough	1,032
25	Tuscarora	CDP	980
26	Friedensburg	CDP	858
27	Ringtown	Borough	818
28	Hegins	CDP	812
29	Gilberton	Borough	769
30	Gordon	Borough	763
31	Lavelle	CDP	742
32	Auburn	Borough	741
33	Deer Lake	Borough	687
34	Ravine	CDP	662
35	Marlin	CDP	661
36	Altamont	CDP	602
37	Renningers	CDP	574
38	Park Crest	CDP	542
39	Kelayres	CDP	533
40	Englewood	CDP	532
41	Mechanicsville	Borough	457
42	Muir	CDP	451
43	Cumbola	CDP	443
44	Forestville	CDP	435
45	Nuremberg (partially in Luzerne County)	CDP	434
46	Reinerton	CDP	424
47	Middleport	Borough	405
48	Branchdale	CDP	388
49	Seltzer	CDP	350
50	Delano	CDP	342
51	Donaldson	CDP	328
52	Port Clinton	Borough	326
53	Orwin	CDP	314
54	Fountain Springs	CDP	278
55	New Ringgold	Borough	276
56	Newtown	CDP	243
57	Grier City	CDP	241
58	Sheppton	CDP	239
59	Heckscherville	CDP	220
60	Oneida	CDP	200
61	Brandonville	CDP	197
62	Locustdale (partially in Columbia County)	CDP	177
63	Buck Run	CDP	176
64	Summit Station	CDP	174
65	McKeansburg	CDP	163
66	Landingville	Borough	159
67	Klingerstown	CDP	127
68	Beurys Lake	CDP	124
69	Mount Carbon	Borough	91

== Notable people ==
- Muhammad Ali, former heavyweight boxing champion, had his training camp in Deer Lake
- Charles Justin Bailey, former commanding general of the 81st Division in World War I
- Gary Becker, economist and University of Chicago professor awarded Nobel Prize in Economic Sciences
- Francis Brennan, Catholic Church cardinal
- Les Brown, former leader of Les Brown and the Band of Renown
- Walter Ciszek, former Catholic missionary, author, and gulag survivor
- George Dietzler, American Civil War general
- Jimmy Dorsey, former jazz musician and band leader
- Tommy Dorsey, former jazz musician and band leader
- David Horst, former Major League Soccer player
- John E. Jones III, former U.S. federal judge
- George Joulwan, former Supreme Allied Commander, Europe
- Danny Litwhiler, former Major League Baseball player
- Molly Maguires, a clandestine society of Irish miners who engaged in a violent confrontation with Pennsylvania mining companies in the 19th century
- John O'Hara, short story writer and novelist
- Henry Pleasants, coal mining engineer and Union Army brigadier general in the American Civil War
- Darryl Ponicsan, novelist
- Conrad Richter, Pulitzer-Prize and National Book Award-winning American novelist
- Victor Schertzinger, musician, film director, and composer.
- John Walson, cable television system pioneer
- Jack Stivetts, professional baseball pitcher of the 1890s, threw no hitter in 1892.

== See also ==
- Mahantongo
- National Register of Historic Places listings in Schuylkill County, Pennsylvania
- Reading Company
- Schuylkill notes
- Yuengling
