= McKeansburg, Pennsylvania =

Unincorporated community in Pennsylvania, US

McKeansburg
- Census-designated place
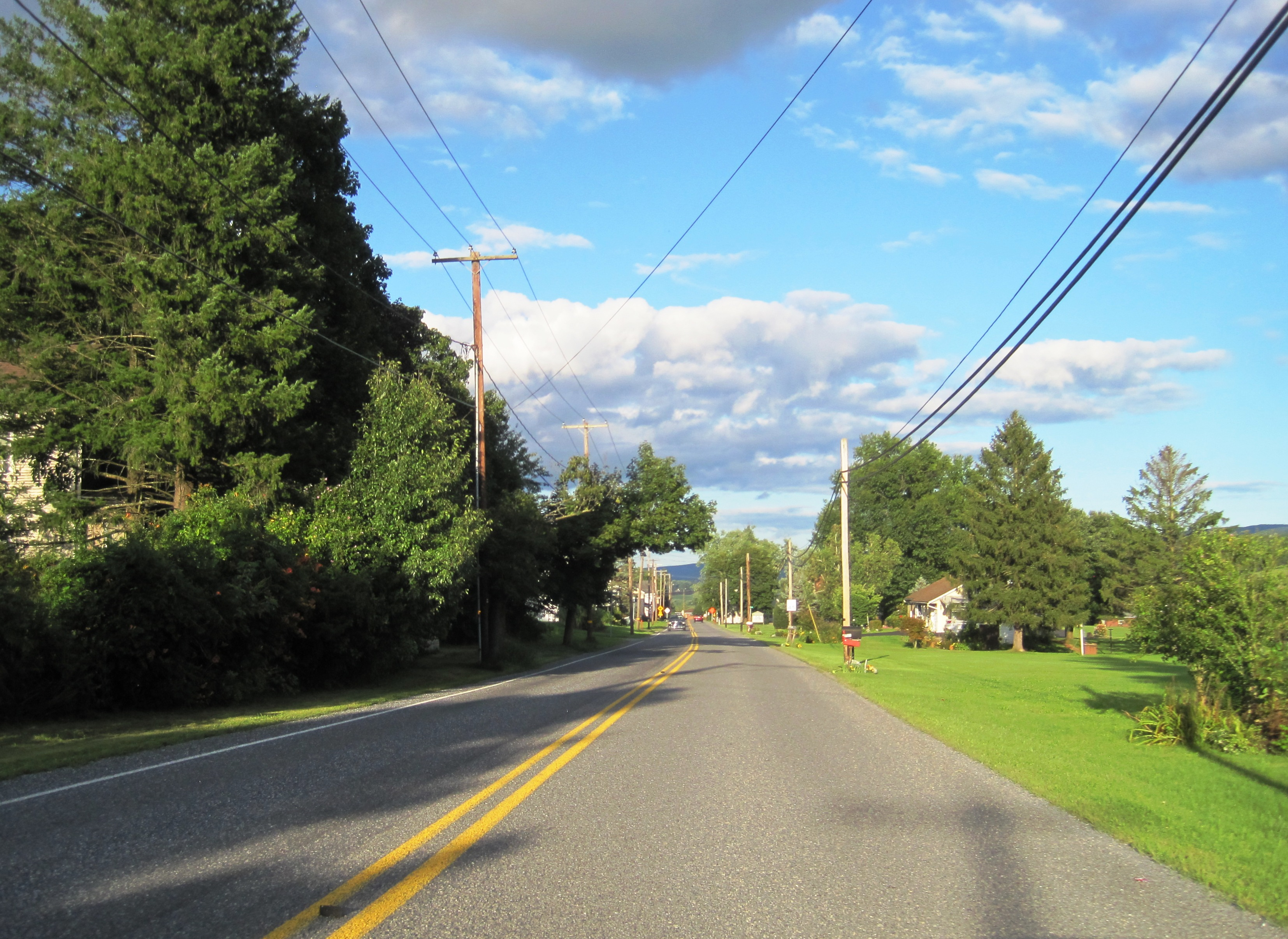
- Eastbound PA 443 in McKeansburg

- Location of McKeansburg in Pennsylvania McKeansburg (the United States)
- Coordinates: 40°40′44″N 76°1′26″W cc
- Country: United States
- State: Pennsylvania
- County: Schuylkill

Area
  - Total: 0.34 sq mi (0.88 km^{2})
  - Land: 0.34 sq mi (0.88 km^{2})
  - Water: 0 sq mi (0.00 km^{2})

Population (2020)
  - Total: 169
  - Density: 499.3/sq mi (192.79/km^{2})
- Time zone: UTC-5 (Eastern (EST))
  - Summer (DST): UTC-4 (EDT)
- FIPS code: 42-46232

McKeansburg is a census-designated place (CDP) in Schuylkill County, Pennsylvania. The population was 169 at the 2020 census.

== Geography ==
McKeansburg is located at 40°40′44″N 76°1′26″W (40.679011, -76.023958).

According to the U.S. Census Bureau, McKeansburg has a total area of 0.3 square miles (0.78 km^{2}), all land. It is located in East Brunswick Township at the junction of Routes 443 and 895, 1 1/2 miles west of New Ringgold. McKeansburg is west of the Little Schuylkill River, which drains it south to the Schuylkill River. It is served by the New Ringgold post office, with the ZIP code of 17960.

== Demographics ==
Historical population
Census	Pop.	Note	%±
2020	169		—
U.S. Decennial Census

At the 2000 census there were 155 people, 64 households, and 44 families living in the CDP. The population density was 455.4 inhabitants per square mile (175.8/km^{2}). There were 70 housing units at an average density of 205.7 per square mile (79.4/km^{2}). The racial makeup of the CDP was 99.35% White, and 0.65% from two or more races. Hispanic or Latino of any race were 0.65%.

Of the 64 households 28.1% had children under the age of 18 living with them, 57.8% were married couples living together, 7.8% had a female householder with no husband present, and 31.3% were non-families. 26.6% of households were one person and 17.2% were one person aged 65 or older. The average household size was 2.42 and the average family size was 2.93.

The age distribution was 21.3% under the age of 18, 9.0% from 18 to 24, 27.1% from 25 to 44, 25.8% from 45 to 64, and 16.8% 65 or older. The median age was 40 years. For every 100 females, there were 70.3 males. For every 100 females age 18 and over, there were 74.3 males.

The median household income was $31,250 and the median family income was $37,500. Males had a median income of $29,375 versus $20,625 for females. The per capita income for the CDP was $16,541. None of the families and 5.2% of the population were living below the poverty line, including no under eighteens and 14.8% of those over 64.
