= Seltzer, Pennsylvania =

Unincorporated community in Pennsylvania, US

Seltzer
- Census-designated place
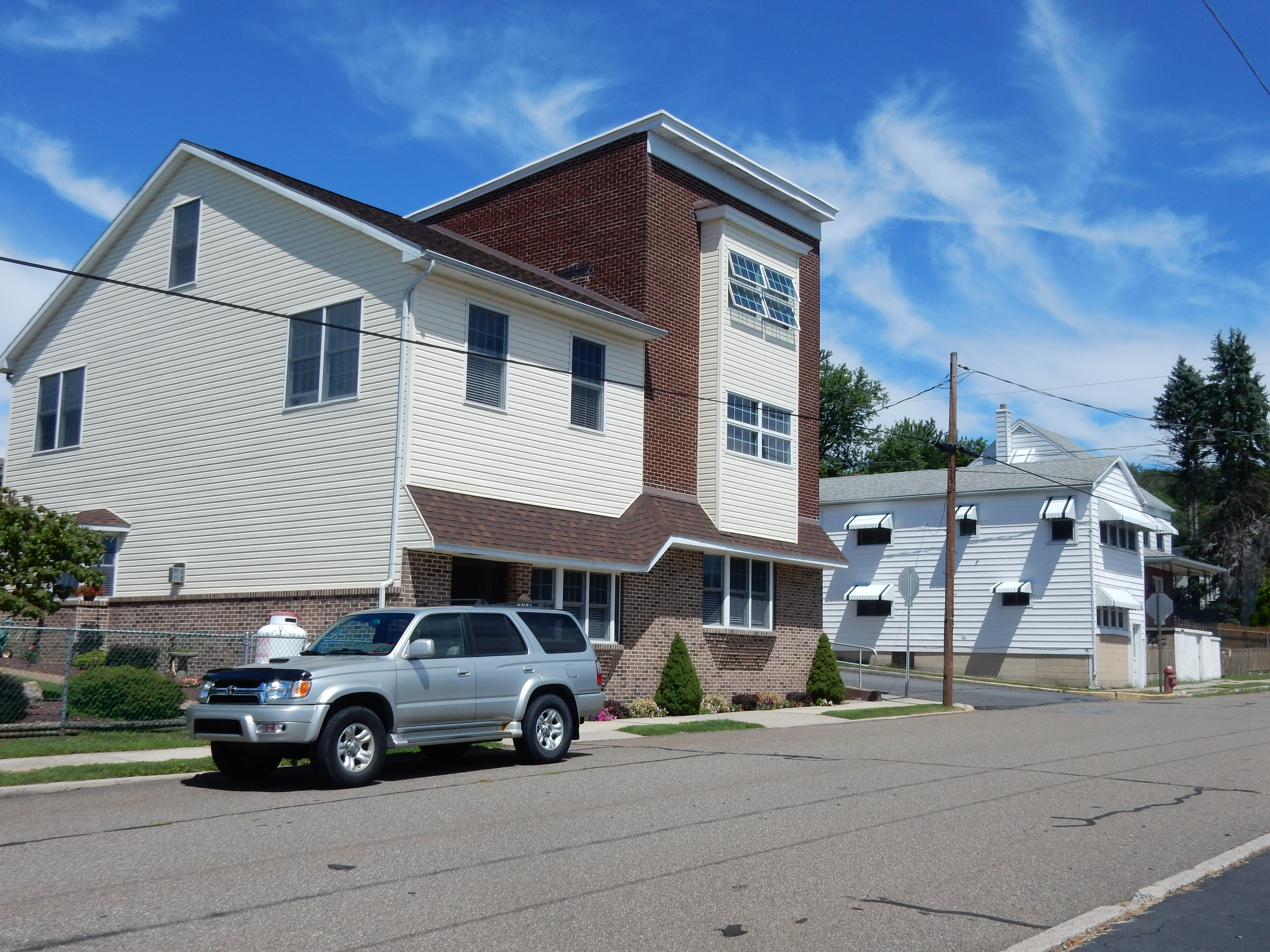
- Main Street in Seltzer.

- Location within the U.S. state of Pennsylvania Seltzer (the United States)
- Coordinates: 40°41′47″N 76°14′8″W
- Country: United States
- State: Pennsylvania
- County: Schuylkill

Area
  - Total: 0.077 sq mi (0.2 km^{2})
  - Land: 0.077 sq mi (0.2 km^{2})

Population (2020)
  - Total: 318
  - Density: 4,100/sq mi (1,600/km^{2})
- Time zone: UTC-5 (Eastern (EST))
  - Summer (DST): UTC-4 (EDT)

Seltzer is a village and census-designated place (CDP) that is located in Schuylkill County, Pennsylvania, United States. The population was 318 at the 2020 census.

Seltzer is located in Norwegian Township.

== History ==
Seltzer was named after Conrad Seltzer, a nineteenth-century German immigrant who established a meatpacking business. The Seltzer Packing Company became one of the largest of its kind in Pennsylvania. Conrad Seltzer was also elected as Schuylkill County treasurer for one term in 1864, running as a Democrat. His descendants became prominent in Schuylkill County business and politics.

== Geography ==
Seltzer is located at 40°41′47″N 76°14′8″W (40.696252, -76.235543).

According to the United States Census Bureau, the CDP has a total area of 0.1 square miles (0.26 km^{2}), all land.

== Demographics ==
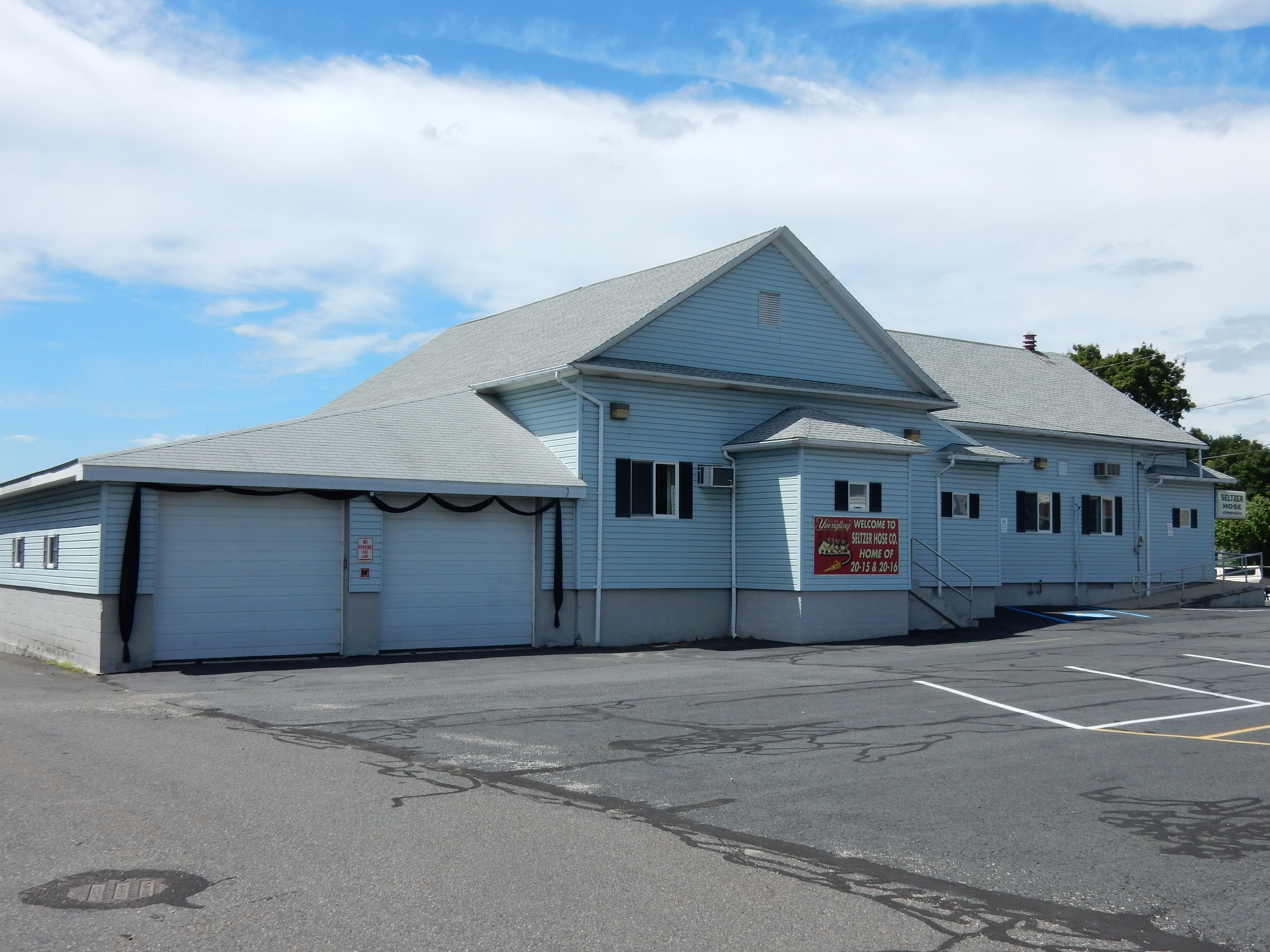
Seltzer Hose Co.

The total population in 2010 was 296 according to the U.S. Census Bureau in this Census Designated Place (CDP). The racial makeup of the CDP was 100.00% White.

There were 86.2 males per 100 females (137 male, 159 female). The age breakdown shows 35 children under 15 years of age, 47 between ages 15–19, 7 aged 20–34, 124 aged 35–54, 83 aged 55 and older.

20.7% of the population aged 15 and older has never married. 55.6% are now married (in 2010). 9.2% are divorced or separated. 14.6% are widowed. 72.9% of the population 25 years of age or older in the CDP have graduated from high school or attended college, including 11.6% with a graduate or professional degree. The median income per capita (15 years of age and older) was $16,042. 14.9% of the population is living below the poverty line.

Data from the 2010 American Community Survey conducted by the Census Bureau indicates that there were 127 households in the CDP with 78 total families.

The median income for a household in the CDP was $48,681.

== In popular culture ==
In January 2020, Anheuser-Busch introduced a new product, Bud Light Seltzer, with television commercials featuring the fake "mayor" of the "town" of Seltzer, Pennsylvania, the "unofficial spokes-town" for the product. Anheuser-Busch donated $15,000 to the real Seltzer fire company and threw a launch party.
