= Pine Grove Area School District =

School district in Pennsylvania

Address
- 103 School Street Schuylkill, Pennsylvania, 17963; United States

District information
- Type: Public

Students and staff
- District mascot: Cardinals

Other information
- Website: pgasd.com

The Pine Grove Area School District is a public school district in Schuylkill County, Pennsylvania. It serves the municipalities of Pine Grove, Tremont, Frailey Township, Washington Township, Pine Grove Township, and Tremont Township.

The district includes one elementary, one middle, and one high school. The district encompasses approximately 109 square miles (280 km^{2}). According to 2000 federal census data, it serves a resident population of 11,284.
