= Pennsylvania Route 125 =

State highway in Pennsylvania, US

Pennsylvania Route 125

Route information
- Maintained by PennDOT
- Length: 32.045 mi (51.571 km)

Major junctions
- South end: PA 443 in Pine Grove
- I-81 in Tremont Township; US 209 in Tremont; PA 25 in Hegins Township
- North end: PA 61 in Shamokin

Location
- Country: United States
- State: Pennsylvania
- Counties: Schuylkill, Northumberland

Highway system
- Pennsylvania State Route System; Interstate; US; State; Scenic; Legislative
← PA 124	→ PA 126

Pennsylvania Route 125 (PA 125) is a 32.0-mile-long (51.5 km) state highway located in Schuylkill and Northumberland counties in Pennsylvania. The southern terminus is at PA 443 in Pine Grove. The northern terminus is at PA 61 in Shamokin. The route follows a winding alignment through mountains and valleys in the western part of the Coal Region. PA 125 does not directly access Interstate 81 (I-81); however, north of Pine Grove, there is an interchange with SR 3013 (Molleystown Road) just yards from the highway in Ravine. The route has a concurrency with U.S. Route 209 (US 209) in Tremont and crosses PA 25 in Hegins. PA 125 was designated in 1928 between PA 25 in Hegins and US 209 in Newtown while the present alignment between Pine Grove and Hegins was a part of PA 25 and the section between Line Mountain and Shamokin was part of PA 225. PA 125 was realigned to its current alignment between PA 443 in Pine Grove and US 122 (now PA 61) in Shamokin in the 1930s, with the former section between Hegins and Newtown becoming a realigned PA 25.

== Route description ==
PA 125 begins at an intersection with PA 443 in the borough of Pine Grove in Schuylkill County, heading northwest on two-lane undivided North Tulpehocken Street. The road passes homes and a few businesses before crossing into Pine Grove Township and becoming Tremont Road. Here, the route heads north into wooded areas with some development, following the Swatara Creek which is situated east of the road and passing through North Pine Grove. PA 125 begins to run a short distance to the east of I-81 as it passes through a forested gap of Second Mountain and crosses the creek. The road heads into Tremont Township and turns northeast as South Tremont Road, intersecting Molleystown Road, which continues northwest to interchange with I-81 a short distance to the west. In the vicinity of this intersection, the route is a divided highway. PA 125 becomes undivided again and runs through more forests parallel to the Swatara Creek, turning north-northwest as it passes through Echo Valley and crosses Sharp Mountain. The road curves to the northeast again before another turn to the north, crossing Swatara Creek. The route crosses a Reading Blue Mountain and Northern Railroad line prior to entering the borough of Tremont and heading northeast on Branch Street, passing through wooded areas of homes. PA 125 heads back into Tremont Township and comes to an intersection with US 209, turning southwest to form a concurrency with that route. The two routes head back into Tremont and merge onto East Main Street, heading into business areas. PA 125 splits from US 209 by heading northwest on Spring Street. The route heads past homes, turning to the west and passing a mix of residences and industrial establishments.

The road curves north and heads into Frailey Township, becoming North Tremont Road and running through forests. PA 125 heads into the residential community of Donaldson and becomes South Maple Street, turning west onto East Center Street. The road continues through more of the community and becomes West Center Street before leaving Donaldson and heading into more forests, running a short distance to the north of the Reading Blue Mountain and Northern Railroad line. The route passes under I-81 prior to heading into Porter Township and becoming East Center Street. PA 125 reaches the community of Good Spring, where it turns north onto Main Street, heading into Hegins Township and becoming South Good Spring Road. The road curves northeast to ascend Broad Mountain before a turn to the northwest to descend the mountain. The route runs north through the wooded residential community of Lamberson and continues into agricultural areas with a few homes. PA 125 enters the residential community of Hegins, where it crosses PA 25 and becomes North Good Spring Road. The road heads through more farmland with some woods and homes before heading into forested areas and turning northwest to ascend Mahantango Mountain. The route enters Eldred Township and becomes Vista Road, descending the mountain. PA 125 turns to the north to head into an agricultural valley with some woods and residences, curving northwest before heading more to the north. The route continues farther north before turning west onto Main Road.

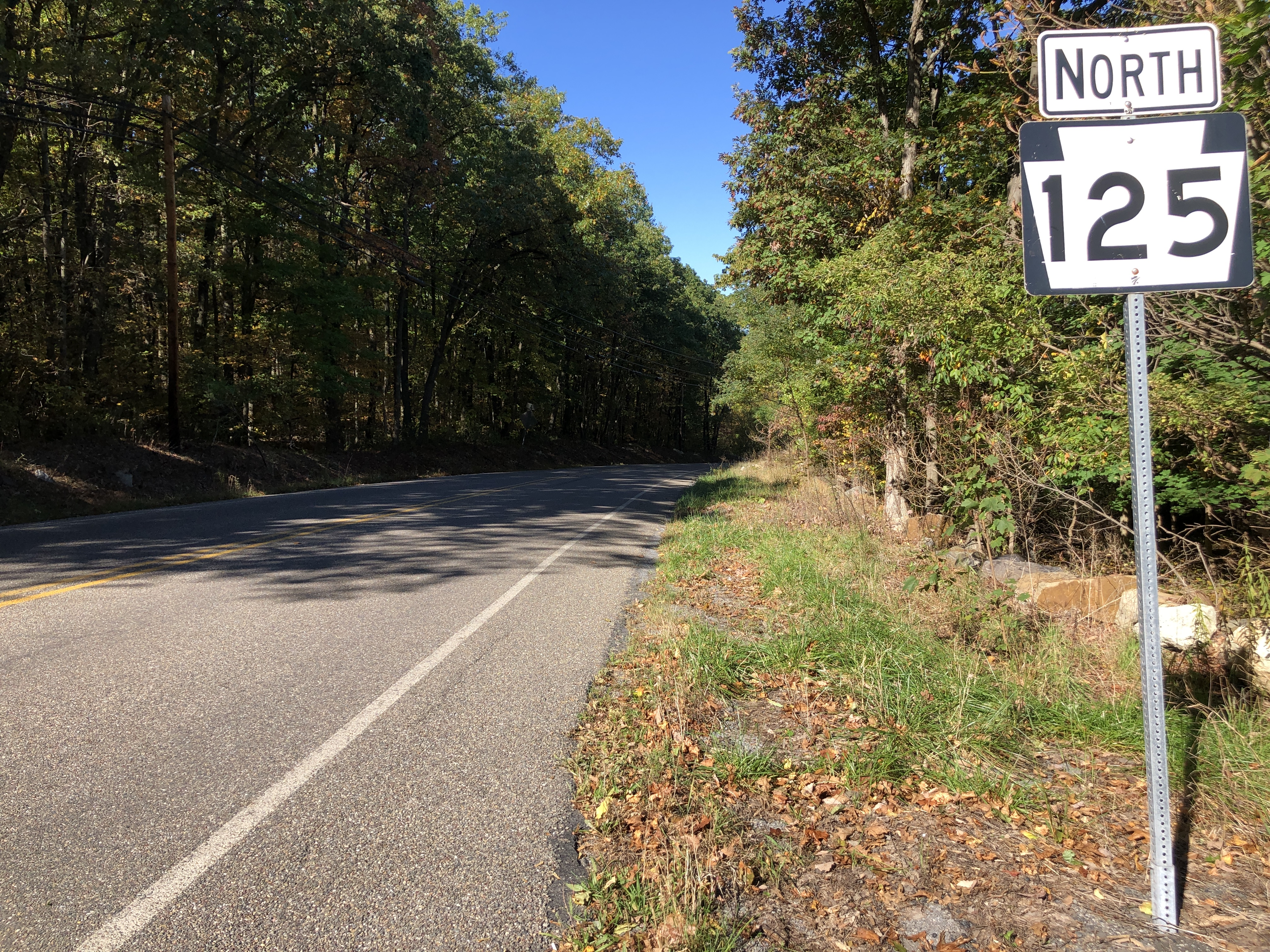
PA 125 northbound entering Coal Township

PA 125 crosses into Upper Mahanoy Township in Northumberland County and becomes an unnamed road, soon turning to the north in the community of Line Mountain. The road winds through a mix of farmland and woodland before turning northwest to ascend forested Line Mountain. The route heads into East Cameron Township and turns northeast to descend the mountain. PA 125 crosses the Mahanoy Creek and winds northeast through a valley, passing through areas of farmland and woodland. The road passes through Gowen City and turns northwest to cross forested Mahanoy Mountain, crossing into Coal Township. The route passes a few fields and runs through Burnside, heading into more forested areas. PA 125 curves more to the north and becomes Bear Valley Road, curving northeast and heading into the city of Shamokin. At this point, the road becomes Bear Valley Avenue and heads into residential areas. PA 125 turns to the north and becomes South Market Street, gaining a wide median as it passes more homes. The route heads into the commercial downtown and becomes North Market Street, crossing the Shamokin Valley Railroad and passing more businesses. PA 125 becomes an undivided road again for a block before ending at PA 61.

== History ==
When Pennsylvania first legislated routes in 1911, the current alignment of PA 125 was not given a number. PA 125 was designated in 1928 to run from PA 25 in Hegins east to US 209 in Newtown along an unpaved road. Meanwhile, the current alignment between Pine Grove and Hegins was designated as part of PA 25 while the section between Line Mountain and Shamokin was designated as part of PA 225, all of which was unpaved except for small sections of PA 25 north of Pine Grove and south of Hegins as well as a stretch of PA 225 south of Shamokin. In the 1930s, PA 125 was realigned to its current alignment running between PA 443 in Pine Grove and US 122 (now PA 61) in Shamokin, replacing the section of PA 25 between Pine Grove and Hegins and PA 225 between Line Mountain and Shamokin. Meanwhile, the former routing of PA 125 between Hegins and Newtown became a realigned PA 25. At this time, the entire length of PA 125 was paved. On October 6, 2017, a section of PA 125 in Porter Township was closed indefinitely after it collapsed due to a sinkhole that was 25 feet (7.6 m) wide and 25 feet (7.6 m) deep.

== Major intersections ==
County	Location	mi	km	Destinations	Notes
Schuylkill	Pine Grove	0.000	0.000	PA 443 (Tulpehocken Street / Pottsville Street) to PA 501 / PA 895 east	Southern terminus
Schuylkill	Tremont Township	3.032	4.880	I-81 – Harrisburg, Hazleton	Access via Molleystown Road; exit 104 on I-81
Schuylkill	Tremont	6.802	10.947	US 209 north (Market Street) – Pottsville	Southern end of US 209 concurrency
Schuylkill	Tremont	7.234	11.642	US 209 south (Main Street) – Millersburg	Northern end of US 209 concurrency
Schuylkill	Hegins Township	15.383	24.757	PA 25 (Main Street)	
Northumberland	Shamokin	32.045	51.571	PA 61 (Sunbury Street)	Northern terminus
1.000 mi = 1.609 km; 1.000 km = 0.621 mi: Concurrency terminus
