= Pennsylvania Route 25 =

State highway in Pennsylvania, US

Pennsylvania Route 25

Route information
- Maintained by PennDOT
- Length: 34.975 mi (56.287 km)

Major junctions
- West end: US 209 in Millersburg
- PA 225 in Berrysburg; PA 125 in Hegins; I-81 near Newtown
- East end: US 209 in Newtown

Location
- Country: United States
- State: Pennsylvania
- Counties: Dauphin, Schuylkill

Highway system
- Pennsylvania State Route System; Interstate; US; State; Scenic; Legislative
← PA 24	→ PA 26

Pennsylvania Route 25 (PA 25) is a 35-mile-long (56 km) state highway located in Dauphin and Schuylkill counties in central Pennsylvania. The western terminus of the route is at U.S. Route 209 (US 209) in Millersburg. The eastern terminus is at US 209 in Newtown. PA 25 runs parallel to the Mahantongo Mountains and the Mahantango Valley, as well as US 209, for its entire length. The route passes through the communities of Berrysburg, Gratz, Sacramento, and Hegins. PA 25 intersects PA 225 in Berrysburg, PA 125 in Hegins, and Interstate 81 (I-81) in Frailey Township. PA 25 was designated in 1928 to run from US 209 in Millersburg east to PA 443 in Pine Grove, running east to Hegins before heading southeast to Tremont and south to Pine Grove. The road between Hegins and Newtown was designated as PA 125. PA 25 was realigned to head east from Hegins to Newtown in the 1930s, with the former alignment between Pine Grove and Hegins becoming a relocated PA 125.

== Route description ==
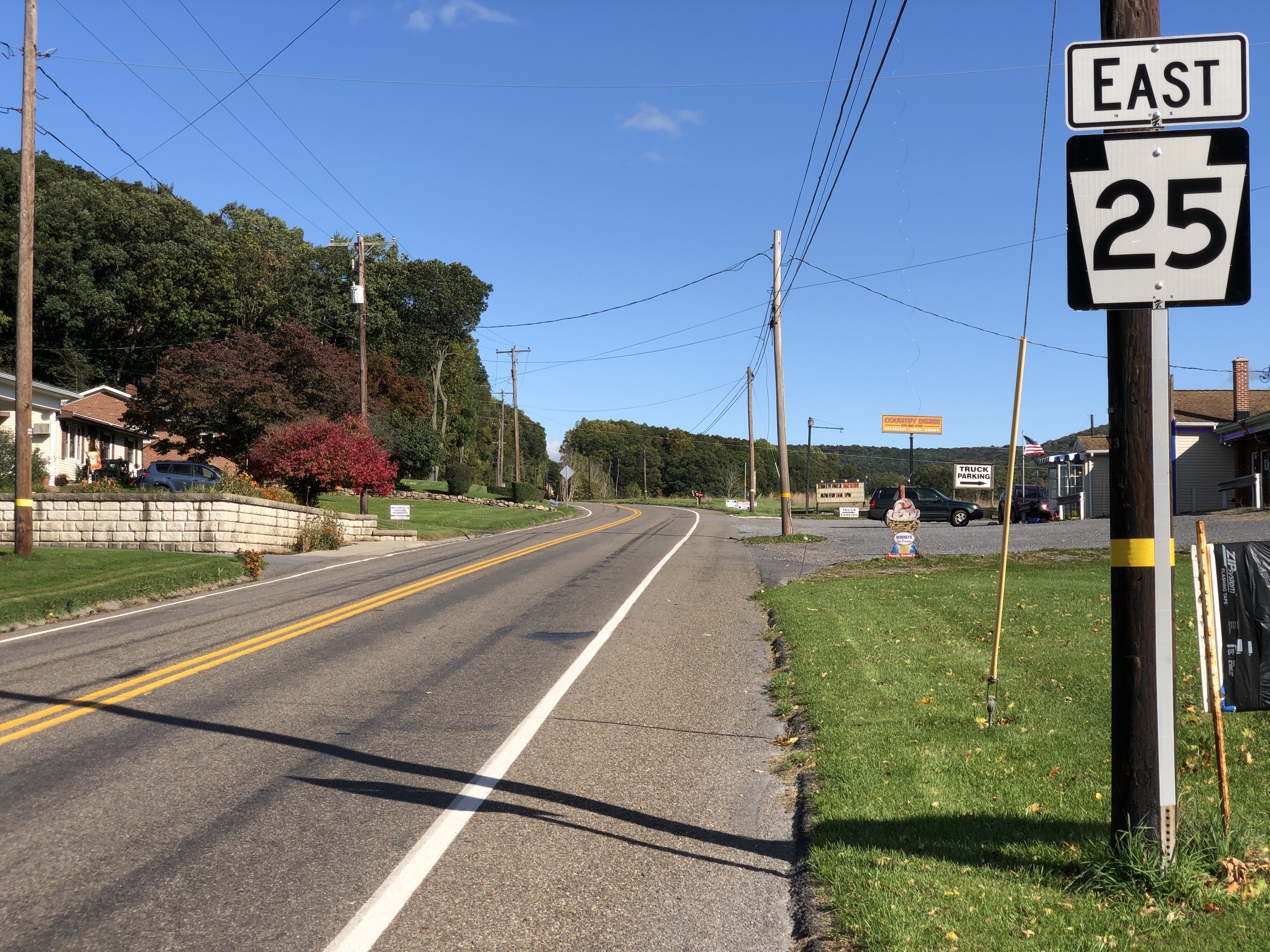
PA 25 eastbound in Hegins Township

PA 25 begins at an intersection with US 209 in the borough of Millersburg in Dauphin County, heading northeast on two-lane undivided Johnson Street. The road passes homes and continues into Upper Paxton Township, becoming Berrysburg Road and heading into open agricultural areas with a few residences in the Lykens Valley, a rural valley that is home to an Amish community. The route runs through Killinger and continues through more rural areas, curving more to the east. PA 25 crosses into Mifflin Township and becomes an unnamed road, passing through Curtin and heading to the northeast. The road enters the borough of Berrysburg and becomes West Market Street, passing homes and coming to an intersection with PA 225. At this point, the route becomes East Market Street and runs past more residences before heading back into Mifflin Township and becoming an unnamed road that passes through open farmland. PA 25 continues into Lykens Township and runs through more rural areas with occasional homes. The road becomes the border between Lykens Township to the north and the borough of Gratz to the south as it becomes West Market Street and passes through agricultural areas with residential and commercial development, fully entering Gratz. The route continues past more homes along with some businesses, becoming a divided highway as it passes through the center of town and becomes East Market Street. PA 25 turns into an undivided road again and leaves the developed part of town for farmland with some homes and businesses. The road heads into Lykens Township again and becomes unnamed as it runs through agricultural areas with occasional woods and residences.

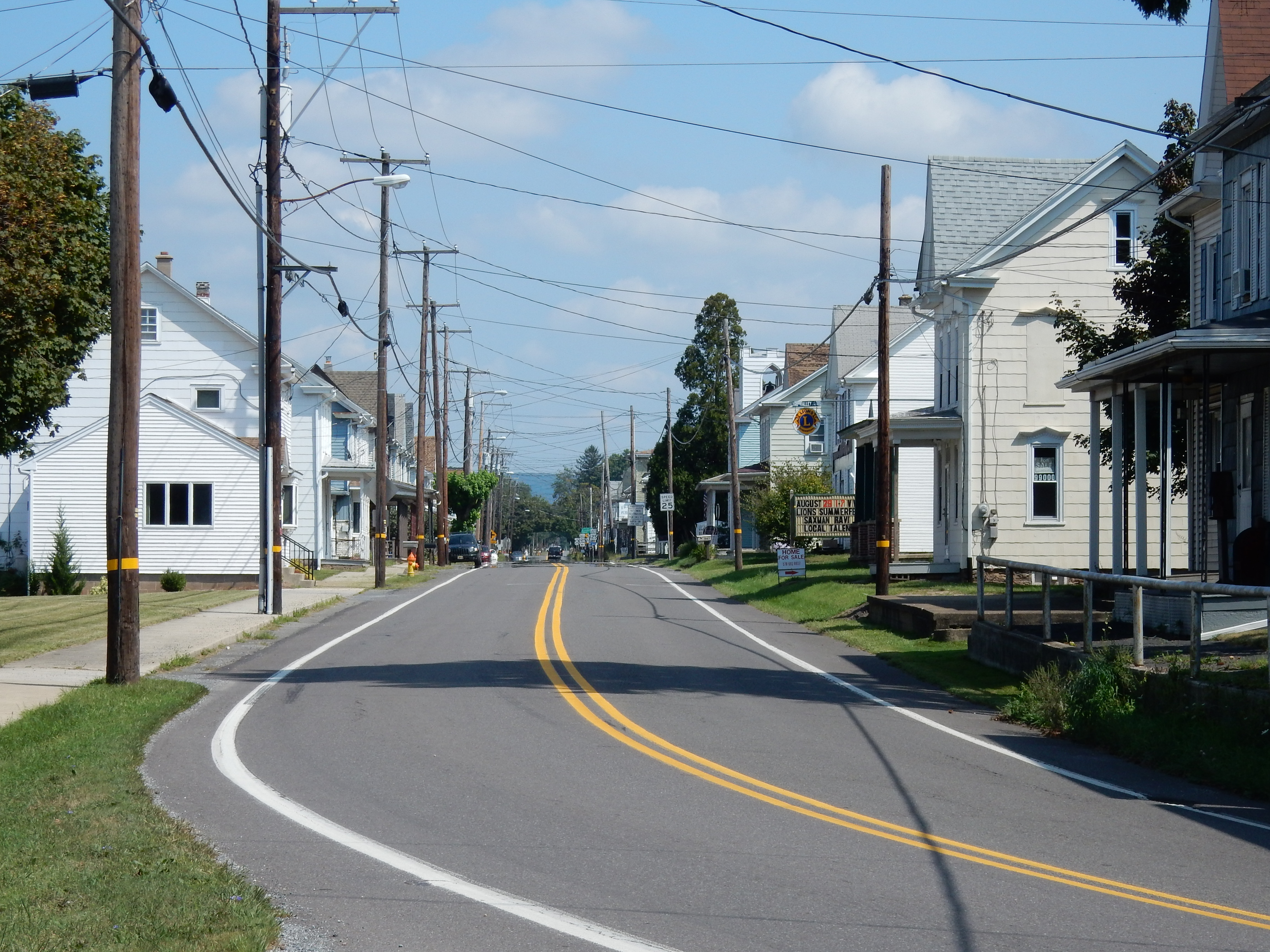
PA 25 on Main Street in Hegins

PA 25 crosses into Hubley Township in Schuylkill County and becomes West Main Street, continuing through areas of farms with some woodland and homes. The road passes through the residential community of Spring Glen before becoming East Main Street and running through Sacramento. The route continues into Hegins Township and becomes West Main Street, heading into the community of Valley View, where it passes several homes along with a few businesses. PA 25 runs through rural areas of residences and becomes East Main Street, passing to the north of Tri-Valley Junior/Senior High School, before heading past more homes in the community of Hegins and coming to a junction with PA 125. The road leaves the community and enters open farmland with a few homes, reaching Fountain. Past here, the route heads into forested areas and begins to cross Broad Mountain, heading northeast. PA 25 curves to the southeast and heads into Frailey Township, reaching an interchange with I-81. From here, the route turns east and heads into Reilly Township, with the name of the road becoming West Pine Street. PA 25 curves to the southeast and crosses Swatara Road before coming to its eastern terminus at another intersection with US 209 in Newtown.

== History ==
When Pennsylvania legislated routes in 1911, what is now PA 25 was not given a number. At this time, the highway existed as an unpaved road between Millersburg and Sacramento. PA 25 was designated in 1928 to run from US 209 in Millersburg east to PA 443 in Pine Grove, following its current alignment to Hegins before it turned southeast to Tremont and south to Pine Grove. At this time, a section of road west of Gratz, between the Dauphin/Schuylkill county line and Hegins, and a short stretch to the north of Pine Grove was paved while a short stretch east of Millersburg was under construction. In 1928, the road between Hegins and Newtown was designated as PA 125, which was unpaved. By 1930, PA 25 was paved between Millersburg and Killinger, between Berrysburg and west of Gratz, and a short distance to the south of Hegins while the road between Killinger and Curtin was under construction. In the 1930s, PA 25 was realigned at Hegins to head east to US 209 in Newtown, replacing PA 125. Meanwhile, the former stretch of PA 25 between Pine Grove and Hegins became part of a realigned PA 125. At this time, the entire length of PA 25 was paved.

== Major intersections ==
County	Location	mi	km	Destinations	Notes
Dauphin	Millersburg	0.000	0.000	US 209 (State Street) – Elizabethville, Millersburg	
Dauphin	Berrysburg	8.995	14.476	PA 225 (Main Street) – Pillow, Elizabethville	
Schuylkill	Hegins Township	26.116	42.030	PA 125 (Good Spring Road) – Shamokin, Tremont	
Schuylkill	Frailey Township	32.060	51.596	I-81 – Harrisburg, Hazleton	Exit 112 (I-81)
Schuylkill	Reilly Township	34.975	56.287	US 209 – Pottsville, Tremont	
1.000 mi = 1.609 km; 1.000 km = 0.621 mi
