= Sacramento, Pennsylvania =

Unincorporated community in Pennsylvania, U.S.

Coordinates: 40°38′04″N 76°35′20″W

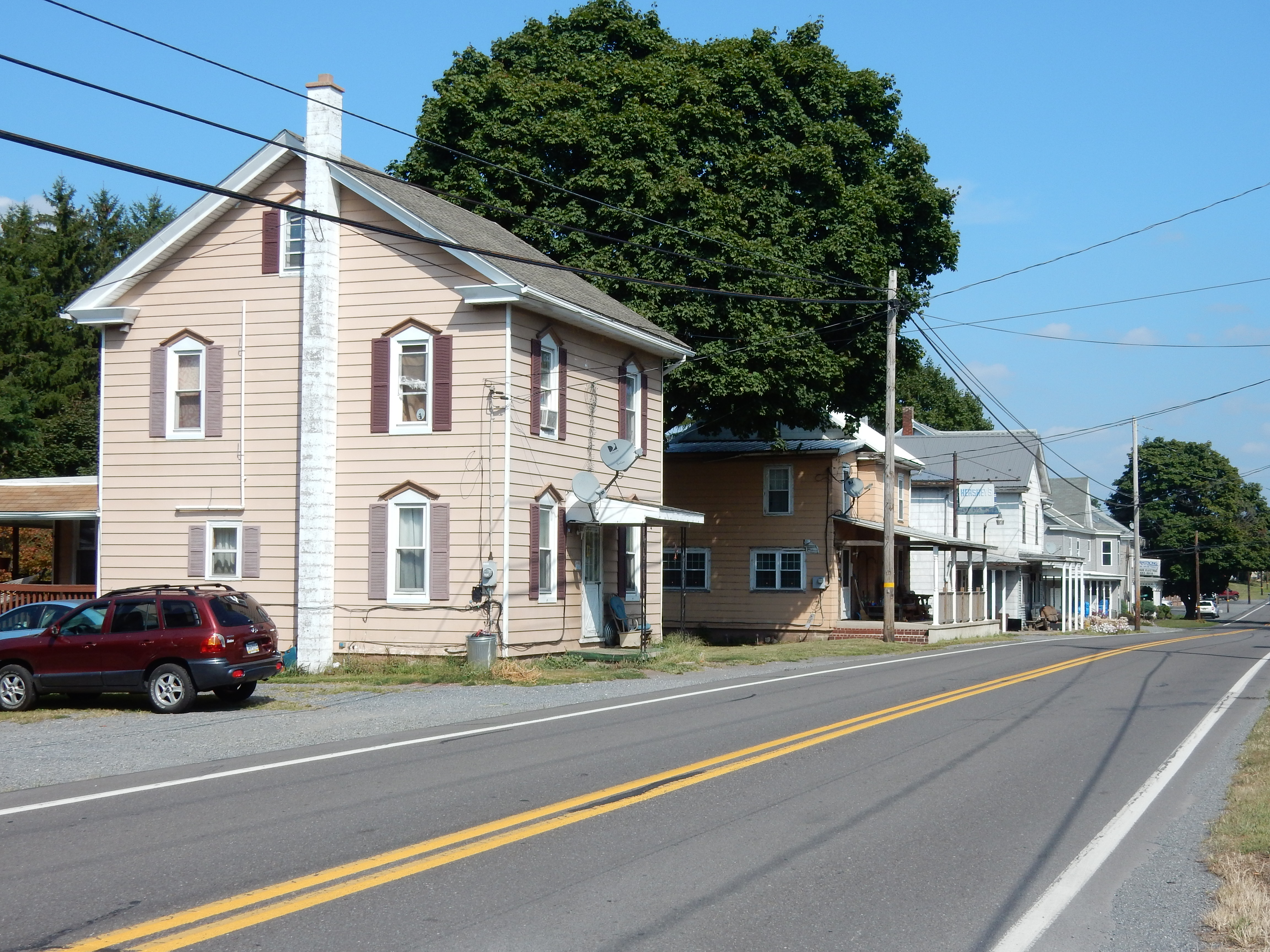
Main Street in Sacramento

Sacramento is an unincorporated community in southeastern Hubley Township, Schuylkill County, Pennsylvania, United States, situated on Route 25. It is located on the Pine Creek, which drains it westward into the Mahantango Creek. It has a post office with the ZIP code of 17968.
