= PA25 =

PA25 may refer to:

- Pennsylvania Route 25
- Pennsylvania's 25th congressional district
- Piper PA-25 Pawnee
