= Caesium fluoroaluminate =

Caesium pentafluoroaluminate
Names
- IUPAC name dicesium pentafluoroaluminate(2-)
- Other names: Aluminum cesium fluoride; Caesium pentafluoroaluminate

Identifiers
CAS Number	138577-01-2
3D model (JSmol)	Interactive image
EC Number	434-690-3
PubChem CID	22239220
CompTox Dashboard (EPA)	DTXSID50894017
- InChI: InChI=1S/Al.2Cs.5FH/h;;;5*1H/q+3;2*+1;;;;;/p-5 Key: YSZIVXMETRGSME-UHFFFAOYSA-I
- SMILES: F[Al-2](F)(F)(F)F.[Cs+].[Cs+]

Properties
Chemical formula	Cs_{2}[AlF_{5}]
Molar mass	387.7844581 g·mol^{−1}
Appearance	White powder
Density	3.7 g/cm^{3}
Melting point	429.5 °C (805.1 °F; 702.6 K)

Hazards
- GHS labelling
Pictograms	(GHS05: Corrosive) (GHS06: Toxic)
Signal word	Danger

Related compounds
Related compounds	Potassium tetrafluoroaluminate
- Except where otherwise noted, data are given for materials in their standard state (at 25 °C [77 °F], 100 kPa). Infobox references

Caesium fluoroaluminate, or more correctly caesium pentafluoroaluminate, is an inorganic compound with the chemical formula (Cs^{+})_{2}[AlF_{5}]^{2−}. It is a salt consisting of caesium cations Cs^{+} and pentafluoroaluminate anions [AlF_{5}]^{2−}.

A similar compound, caesium tetrafluoroaluminate (CsAlF_{4}) also exists.
