= Branchdale, Pennsylvania =

Township in Pennsylvania, US

Branchdale
- Census-designated place
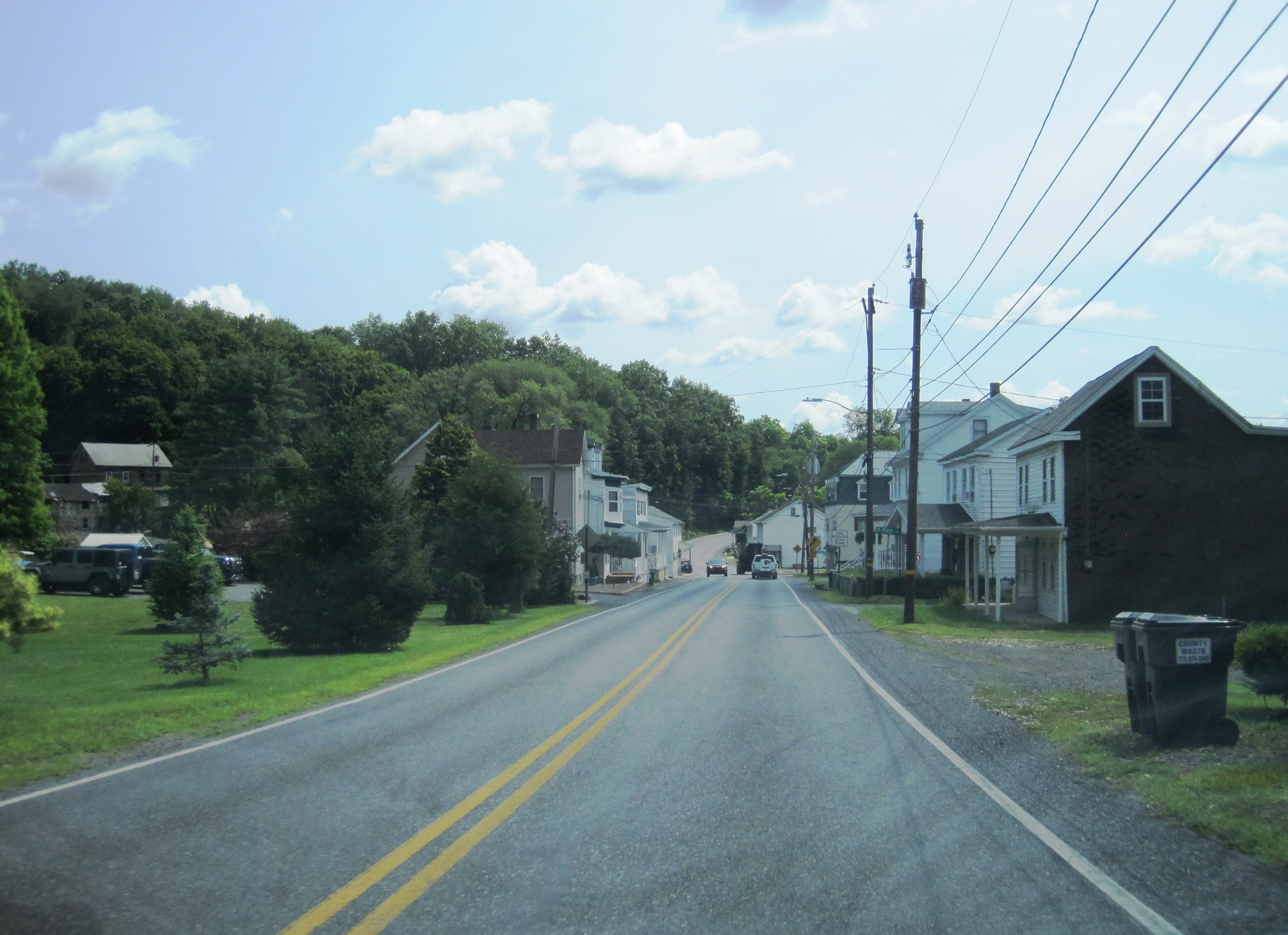
- Photo of Branchdale along US 209

- Location within the U.S. state of Pennsylvania Branchdale (the United States)
- Coordinates: 40°40′14″N 76°19′16″W
- Country: United States
- State: Pennsylvania
- County: Schuylkill

Area
  - Total: 0.71 sq mi (1.85 km^{2})
  - Land: 0.71 sq mi (1.85 km^{2})
  - Water: 0 sq mi (0.00 km^{2})

Population (2020)
  - Total: 328
  - Density: 459.1/sq mi (177.25/km^{2})
- Time zone: UTC-5 (Eastern (EST))
  - Summer (DST): UTC-4 (EDT)
- ZIP codes: 17923
- Area code: 570
- FIPS code: 42-08208

Branchdale is a census-designated place (CDP) in Reilly Township, Pennsylvania, United States. The population was 328 at the 2020 census.

== Geography ==
Branchdale is located at 40°40′14″N 76°19′16″W (40.670453, -76.321152).

According to the United States Census Bureau, the CDP has a total area of 0.9 square miles (2.3 km^{2}), all land.

== Demographics ==
Historical population
Census	Pop.	Note	%±
2020	328		—
U.S. Decennial Census

At the 2000 census there were 436 people, 185 households, and 113 families living in the CDP. The population density was 513.7 inhabitants per square mile (198.3/km^{2}). There were 204 housing units at an average density of 240.4 per square mile (92.8/km^{2}). The racial makeup of the CDP was 99.54% White, and 0.46% from two or more races. Hispanic or Latino of any race were 0.46%.

Of the 185 households 28.1% had children under the age of 18 living with them, 47.6% were married couples living together, 11.9% had a female householder with no husband present, and 38.9% were non-families. 34.1% of households were one person and 19.5% were one person aged 65 or older. The average household size was 2.36 and the average family size was 3.04.

The age distribution was 24.5% under the age of 18, 6.9% from 18 to 24, 28.9% from 25 to 44, 19.3% from 45 to 64, and 20.4% 65 or older. The median age was 38 years. For every 100 females, there were 89.6 males. For every 100 females age 18 and over, there were 83.8 males.

The median household income was $27,321 and the median family income was $36,563. Males had a median income of $31,944 versus $21,563 for females. The per capita income for the CDP was $14,378. About 5.7% of families and 12.0% of the population were below the poverty line, including 14.6% of those under age 18 and 8.8% of those age 65 or over.

== Education ==
The school district is Minersville Area School District.
