= Reilly Township =

Reilly Township may refer to the following townships in the United States:

- Reilly Township, Butler County, Ohio
- Reilly Township, Pennsylvania
