= Spring Glen, Pennsylvania =

Unincorporated community in Pennsylvania, US

- Unincorporated community
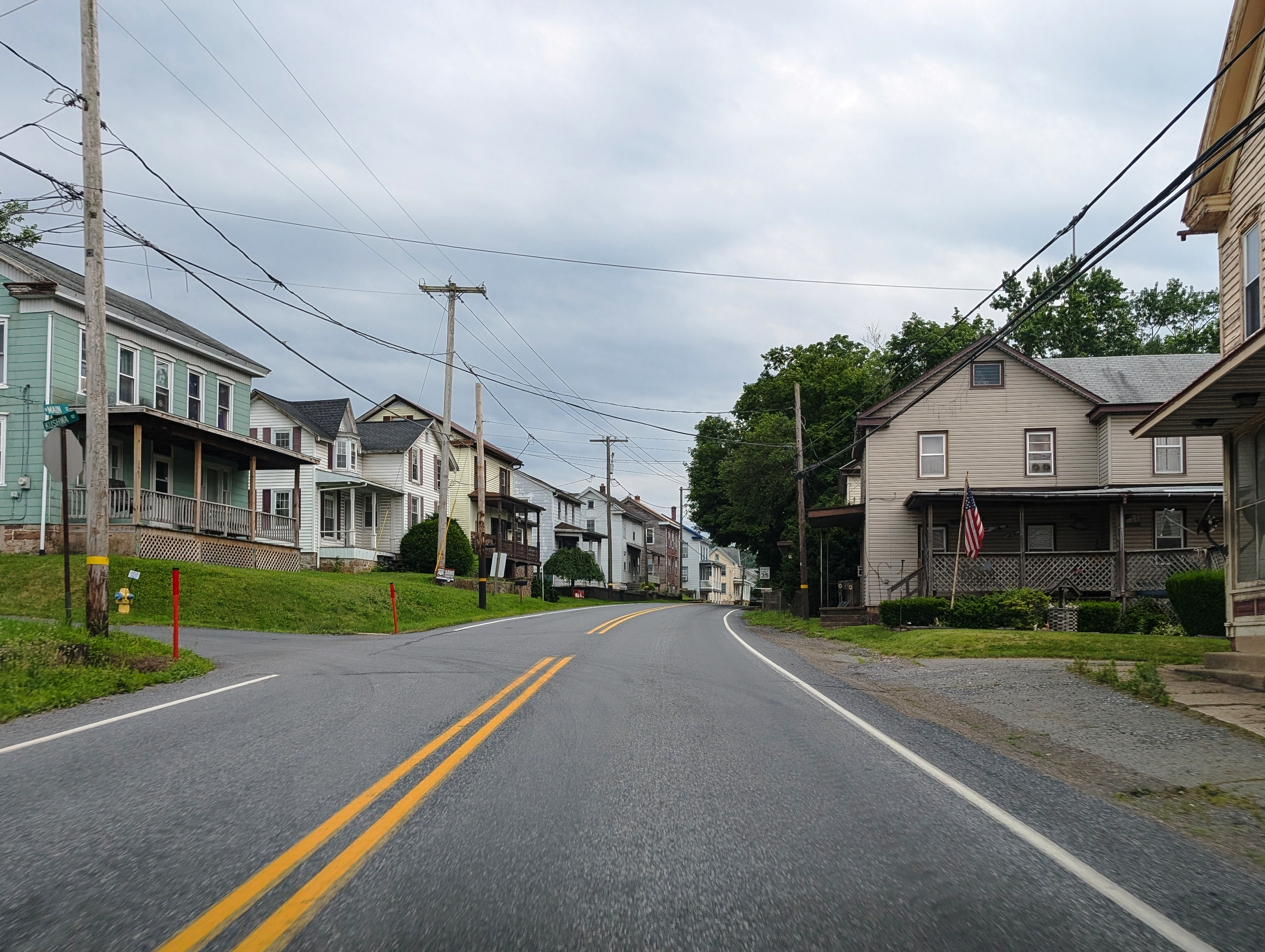
- PA 25 westbound in Spring Glen

- Location within Pennsylvania
- Coordinates: 40°37′34″N 76°37′15″W
- Country: United States
- State: Pennsylvania
- County: Schuylkill
- Elevation: 627 ft (191 m)
- Time zone: UTC-5 (Eastern (EST))
  - Summer (DST): UTC-4 (EDT)
- ZIP code: 17978
- Area codes: 223 & 717
- GNIS feature ID: 1193422

Spring Glen is an unincorporated community in Schuylkill County, Pennsylvania, United States. The community is located along Pennsylvania Route 25, 5.3 miles (8.5 km) east of Gratz. Spring Glen has a post office with ZIP code 17978, which opened on February 24, 1880.
