= Duncott, Pennsylvania =

Unincorporated community in Pennsylvania, US

Duncott
- Census-designated place
- Location within the U.S. state of Pennsylvania Duncott (the United States)
- Coordinates: 40°43′15″N 76°15′59″W
- Country: United States
- State: Pennsylvania
- County: Schuylkill

Area
  - Total: 0.15 sq mi (0.4 km^{2})
  - Land: 0.15 sq mi (0.4 km^{2})

Population (2000)
  - Total: 76
  - Density: 490/sq mi (190/km^{2})
- Time zone: UTC-5 (Eastern (EST))
  - Summer (DST): UTC-4 (EDT)
- Area code: 570

Duncott is a census-designated place (CDP) in Schuylkill County, Pennsylvania, United States, near Minersville in the Coal Region. The population was 76 at the 2000 census. It is located in Cass Township.

== Geography ==
Duncott is located at (40.720951, -76.266458).

According to the United States Census Bureau, the CDP has a total area of 0.2 square mile (0.4 km^{2}), all land.

== Demographics ==
At the 2000 census there were 76 people, 36 households, and 23 families living in the CDP. The population density was 450.9 inhabitants per square mile (174.1/km^{2}). There were 44 housing units at an average density of 261.1 per square mile (100.8/km^{2}). The racial makeup of the CDP was 100.00% White. Of the 36 households 16.7% had children under the age of 18 living with them, 38.9% were married couples living together, 16.7% had a female householder with no husband present, and 36.1% were non-families. 27.8% of households were one person and 16.7% were one person aged 65 or older. The average household size was 2.11 and the average family size was 2.57.

The age distribution was 14.5% under the age of 18, 2.6% from 18 to 24, 22.4% from 25 to 44, 28.9% from 45 to 64, and 31.6% 65 or older. The median age was 54 years. For every 100 females, there were 100.0 males. For every 100 females age 18 and over, there were 75.7 males.

The median household income was $35,625 and the median family income was $41,250. Males had a median income of $28,750 versus $15,625 for females. The per capita income for the CDP was $18,577. There were 20.0% of families and 28.2% of the population living below the poverty line, including 90.0% of under eighteens and 14.3% of those over 64.
