= Carl Scheib =

American baseball player (1927–2018)

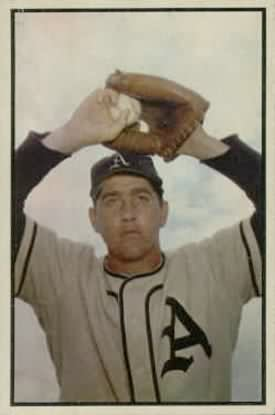
- Pitcher
- Born: January 1, 1927; Gratz, Pennsylvania, U.S.
- Died: March 24, 2018 (aged 91); San Antonio, Texas, U.S.
- Batted: Right Threw: Right

MLB debut
- September 6, 1943, for the Philadelphia Athletics

Last MLB appearance
- May 24, 1954, for the St. Louis Cardinals

MLB statistics
- Win–loss record: 45–65
- Earned run average: 4.88
- Strikeouts: 290
- Stats at Baseball Reference

Teams
- Philadelphia Athletics (1943–1945, 1947–1954); St. Louis Cardinals (1954)

Carl Alvin Scheib (January 1, 1927 – March 24, 2018) was a professional baseball pitcher for the Philadelphia Athletics (1943–1945 and 1947–1954) and St. Louis Cardinals (1954) of Major League Baseball (MLB). Scheib batted and threw right handed.

On September 26, 1943, pitched the final inning of the Athletics' game versus the St. Louis Browns, allowing two hits and zero earned runs with one strikeout. Aged 16 years and 268 days, Scheib is the youngest pitcher to record a strikeout in baseball history.

== Biography ==
Born in Gratz, Pennsylvania, Scheib led the American League in wild pitches with 9 in 1950. He was one of the best-hitting pitchers of his time.

In 1948, he registered 31 hits in 104 at bats, for a batting average of .298 with two home runs and 21 runs batted in. He appeared in 32 games as a pitcher, and 20 more as a pinch hitter.

In 1951, Scheib appeared in 46 games as a pitcher, two more as a pinch hitter, and batted .396 (21 for 53). His .396 mark was the highest for a pitcher with that many at bats since 1925.

During his MLB career, Scheib batted an even .250, with five home runs, 59 RBI and 117 hits in 468 at bats. In 11 seasons, Scheib had a 45–65 win–loss record, in 267 games, with 107 games started, 47 complete games, 17 saves, 1,070 2/3 innings pitched, 290 strikeouts, and a 4.88 ERA.

When Scheib made his first appearance in 1943 at age 16, he was the youngest player in the modern era until Joe Nuxhall debuted with the Cincinnati Reds the following season. Scheib remains the youngest player in American League history. A biography of Scheib entitled "Wonder Boy – The Story of Carl Scheib: The Youngest Player in American League History" by Lawrence Knorr was released May 26, 2016. It was published by Sunbury Press.

== See also ==
- List of baseball players who went directly to Major League Baseball
