= Forestville, Schuylkill County, Pennsylvania =

Unincorporated community in Pennsylvania, US

Forestville
- Census-designated place
- Location within the state of Pennsylvania Forestville (the United States)
- Coordinates: 40°41′25″N 76°17′43″W
- Country: United States
- State: Pennsylvania
- County: Schuylkill
- Township: Cass

Area
  - Total: 0.85 sq mi (2.2 km^{2})
  - Land: 0.85 sq mi (2.2 km^{2})

Population (2000)
  - Total: 431
  - Density: 510/sq mi (200/km^{2})
- Time zone: UTC-5 (Eastern (EST))
  - Summer (DST): UTC-4 (EDT)

Forestville is a census-designated place (CDP) in Schuylkill County, Pennsylvania, United States. The population was 431 at the 2000 census.

== Geography ==
Forestville is located at 40°41′25″N 76°17′43″W (40.690267, -76.295394).

According to the United States Census Bureau, the CDP has a total area of 0.9 square miles (2.3 km^{2}), all land.

== Demographics ==
Historical population
Census	Pop.	Note	%±
2000	431		—

At the 2000 census there were 431 people, 191 households, and 126 families living in the CDP. The population density was 505.8 inhabitants per square mile (195.3/km^{2}). There were 207 housing units at an average density of 242.9 per square mile (93.8/km^{2}). The racial makeup of the CDP was 100.00% White. Of the 191 households 24.6% had children under the age of 18 living with them, 50.8% were married couples living together, 12.0% had a female householder with no husband present, and 34.0% were non-families. 30.9% of households were one person and 15.2% were one person aged 65 or older. The average household size was 2.26 and the average family size was 2.84.

The age distribution was 17.6% under the age of 18, 6.7% from 18 to 24, 24.8% from 25 to 44, 27.1% from 45 to 64, and 23.7% 65 or older. The median age was 46 years. For every 100 females, there were 88.2 males. For every 100 females age 18 and over, there were 88.8 males.

The median household income was $35,156 and the median family income was $41,250. Males had a median income of $36,250 versus $20,313 for females. The per capita income for the CDP was $20,599. About 5.3% of families and 6.9% of the population were below the poverty line, including 4.2% of those under age 18 and 10.2% of those age 65 or over.

== Education ==
The school district is Minersville Area School District.
