= Potassium aluminium fluoride =

Names
- IUPAC name potassium tetrafluoridoaluminate
- Other names potassium tetrafluoroaluminate

Identifiers
CAS Number	14484-69-6
3D model (JSmol)	Interactive image
ChemSpider	11195302
ECHA InfoCard	100.034.971
EC Number	238-485-8
PubChem CID	16714211
CompTox Dashboard (EPA)	DTXSID30893982
- InChI: InChI=1S/Al.4FH.K/h;4*1H;/q+3;;;;;+1/p-4 Key: SKFYTVYMYJCRET-UHFFFAOYSA-J
- SMILES: [K+].F[Al-](F)(F)F

Properties
Chemical formula	KAlF_{4}
Molar mass	142
Appearance	White solid
Density	2.9 g/cm^{3}
Melting point	> 600 °C (1,112 °F; 873 K)
Solubility in water	2 g/L

Hazards
- GHS labelling
Pictograms	(GHS07: Exclamation mark) (GHS08: Health hazard)
Signal word	Danger
Hazard statements	H315, H319, H332, H335, H362, H372, H412
Precautionary statements	P201, P260, P263, P264, P270, P271, P273, P280, P302+P352, P304+P312, P304+P340, P305+P351+P338, P308+P313, P312, P314, P321, P332+P313, P337+P313, P362, P403+P233, P405, P501
Safety data sheet (SDS)	Solvay MSDS
- Except where otherwise noted, data are given for materials in their standard state (at 25 °C [77 °F], 100 kPa). verify (what is ?) Infobox references

Potassium aluminium fluoride (PAF, chemical formula KAlF_{4}) is an inorganic compound.

This compound is used as flux in the smelting of secondary aluminium, to reduce or remove the magnesium content of the melt. The main environmental issue that arises from using PAF is the production of fluoride gases. Calcium hydroxide is widely used to suppress the fluorides produced but in most cases fails to remove it sufficiently.

PAF is also present in a wide range of products for the metals industry as a fluxing agent within additives to help its dispersion within a charge.

It is also used as an insecticide.

A single natural occurrence has been reported at a burning coal bank at Forestville, Pennsylvania, as an unnamed mineral.
