= Gratz, Pennsylvania =

Borough in Pennsylvania, US

- Borough
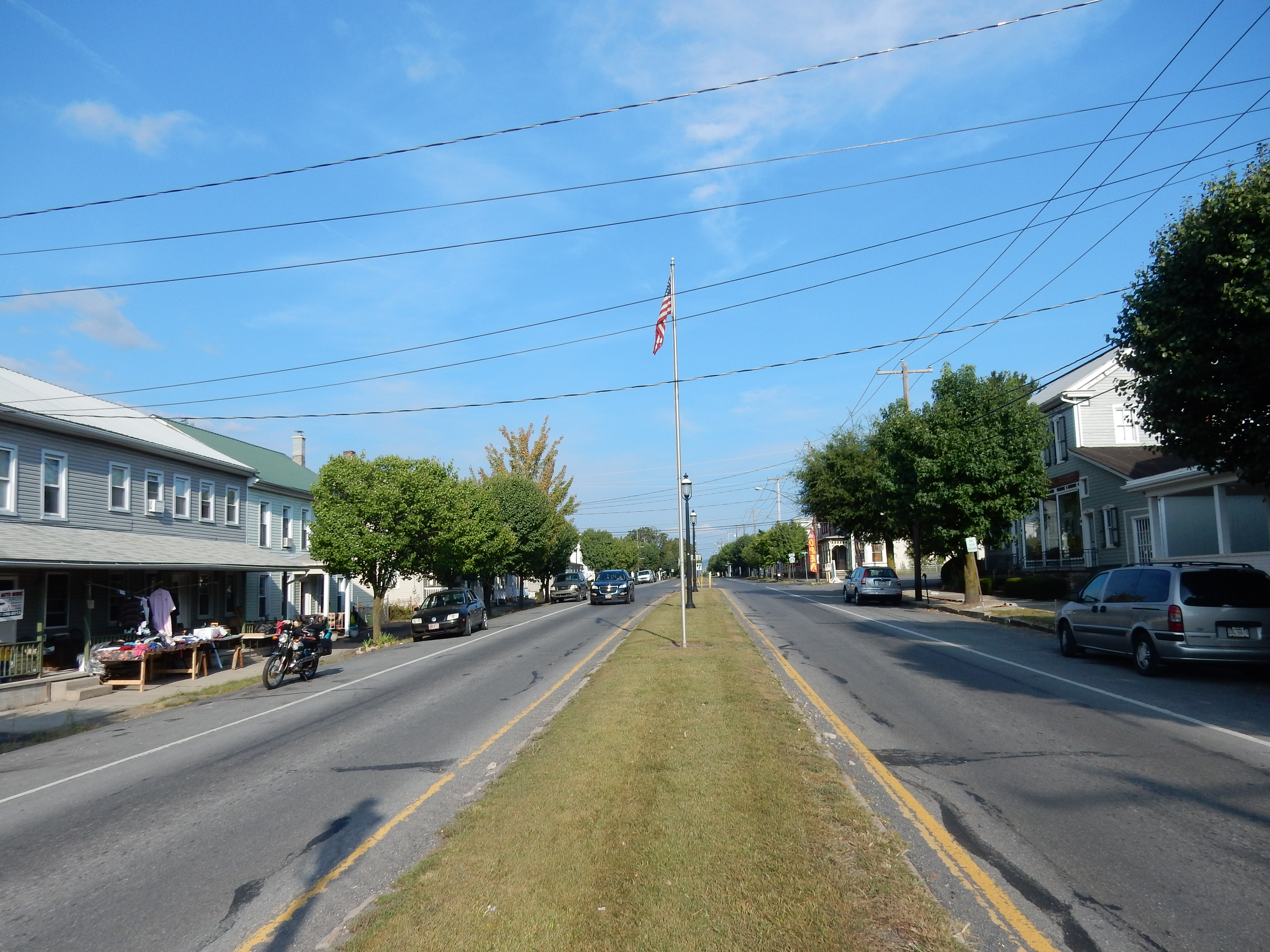
- Market Street in Gratz

- Location in Dauphin County and the U.S. state of Pennsylvania.

- Location in Pennsylvania and the United States Gratz (the United States)
- Coordinates: 40°36′35″N 76°43′04″W
- Country: United States
- State: Pennsylvania
- County: Dauphin
- Settled: 1805
- Incorporated: 1852

Government
  - Type: Borough Council

Area
  - Total: 2.95 sq mi (7.64 km^{2})
  - Land: 2.95 sq mi (7.64 km^{2})
  - Water: 0 sq mi (0.00 km^{2})
- Elevation: 810 ft (250 m)

Population (2020)
  - Total: 743
  - Density: 251.9/sq mi (97.27/km^{2})
- Time zone: UTC-5 (Eastern (EST))
  - Summer (DST): UTC-4 (EDT)
- ZIP code: 17030
- Area code: 717
- FIPS code: 42-30600
- Website: https://gratzboro.com/

Gratz is a borough in Dauphin County, Pennsylvania, United States. The population was 743 at the time of the 2020 census, a decline from the figure of 765 in 2010.

It is part of the Harrisburg metropolitan area.

== History ==
Gratz was named after the founder Simon Gratz.

== Geography ==
Gratz is located in northeastern Dauphin County at 40°36′35″N 76°43′04″W.

It sits along the northern base of Short Mountain, a western extension of Bear Mountain, part of the Ridge and Valley Province of the Appalachian Mountains. Pennsylvania Route 25 passes through the borough, leading east 18 miles (29 km) to Interstate 81 and west 14 miles (23 km) to Millersburg on the Susquehanna River.

According to the United States Census Bureau, the borough has a total area of 2.9 square miles (7.6 km^{2}), all of it land.

== Demographics ==
Historical population
Census	Pop.	Note	%±
1860	313		—
1870	386		23.3%
1880	460		19.2%
1890	490		6.5%
1900	489		−0.2%
1910	536		9.6%
1920	615		14.7%
1930	637		3.6%
1940	692		8.6%
1950	653		−5.6%
1960	704		7.8%
1970	675		−4.1%
1980	678		0.4%
1990	696		2.7%
2000	676		−2.9%
2010	765		13.2%
2020	743		−2.9%
2021 (est.)	742	▼	−0.1%

As of the census of 2000, there were 676 people, 301 households, and 194 families residing in the borough.

The population density was 225.2 inhabitants per square mile (87.0/km^{2}). There were 331 housing units at an average density of 110.3 per square mile (42.6/km^{2}).

The racial makeup of the borough was 99.56% White, 0.30% from other races, and 0.15% from two or more races. Hispanic or Latino of any race were 1.18% of the population.

There were 301 households, out of which 22.9% had children under the age of eighteen living with them; 56.5% were married couples living together, 4.7% had a female householder with no husband present, and 35.5% were non-families. 31.6% of all households were made up of individuals, and 18.6% had someone living alone who was sixty-five years of age or older.

The average household size was 2.25 and the average family size was 2.81.

In the borough the population was spread out, with 19.1% under the age of eighteen, 10.5% from eighteen to twenty-four, 23.8% from twenty-five to forty-four, 24.7% from forty-five to sixty-four, and 21.9% who were sixty-five years of age or older. The median age was forty-two years.

For every one hundred females, there were 103.6 males. For every one hundred females who were aged eighteen or older, there were 96.1 males.

The median income for a household in the borough was $32,917, and the median income for a family was $46,063. Males had a median income of $31,429 compared with that of $21,500 for females.

The per capita income for the borough was $16,837.

Roughly 8.6% of families and 14.3% of the population were living below the poverty line, including 14.9% of those who were under the age of eighteen and 18.8% of those who were aged sixty-five or older.

== Notable person ==
- Carl Scheib, Major League Baseball pitcher and youngest player in American League history on his debut in 1943, aged sixteen
- Al Shade, Country musician and radio DJ. He performed for 50 years, broadcast thousands of radio shows, and recorded 18 albums, primarily with his wife Jean Shade.
