= Minersville Area School District =

School district in Pennsylvania

Address
- 1 Battlin' Miner Drive, PO Box 787 Minersville, Schuylkill County, Pennsylvania, 17954; United States

Other information
- Website: www.battlinminers.com

The Minersville Area School District is a small, rural public school district in Schuylkill County, Pennsylvania. It is centered on the borough of Minersville and also serves Branch Township, Cass Township, Foster Township, and Reilly Township. The district encompasses approximately 55 square miles.

According to 2000 federal census data, the school district served a resident population of 10,732 people. By 2010, the district's population declined to 9, 168 people. The educational attainment levels for the Minersville Area School District population (25 years old and over) were 87.6% high school graduates and 12.2% college graduates. The district is one of the 500 public school districts of Pennsylvania.

According to the Pennsylvania Budget and Policy Center, 47.1% of the district's pupils lived at 185% or below the Federal Poverty Level as shown by their eligibility for the federal free or reduced price school meal programs in 2012. In 2009, Minersville Area School District residents’ per capita income was $15,544, while the median family income was $38,655. In the Commonwealth, the median family income was $49,501 and the United States median family income was $49,445, in 2010. In Schuylkill County, the median household income was $45,012. By 2013, the median household income in the United States rose to $52,100. In 2014, the median household income in the USA was reported as $53,700.

Minersville Area School District operates: Early Childhood Education Center (a publicly funded preschool and full-day kindergarten), Minersville Area Elementary Center (1st-6th) and Minersville Area Junior Senior High School (7th-12). High school students may choose to attend the Schuylkill Technology Centers for training in the construction and mechanical trades. The Schuylkill Intermediate Unit IU29 provides the district with a wide variety of services like: specialized education for disabled students; state mandated training on recognizing and reporting child abuse; speech and visual disability services; criminal background check processing for prospective employees and professional development for staff and faculty.

== Extracurriculars ==
Minersville Area School District offers a variety of clubs, activities and an extensive sports program. It offers: Spanish club, Academic League, Drama Club,Student Council, National Honor Society, and Yearbook. The music program includes: Marching band, chorus, and a musical.

== Sports ==
The district funds three teams in many of its sports:

Varsity

Boys

- Baseball - AA
- Basketball - AAA
- Cross country - A
- Football - AA
- Golf - AA
- Soccer - A
- Track and field - AA

Girls

- Basketball - AA
- Cross country - A
- Golf - AA
- Soccer - A
- Softball - AA
- Track and field - AA
- Volleyball - AA

Junior high school sports

Boys

- Basketball
- Cross country
- Football

Girls

- Basketball
- Cross country
- Softball

According to PIAA directory July 2016
