= Donaldson, Pennsylvania =

Unincorporated community in Pennsylvania, US

Donaldson
- Census-designated place
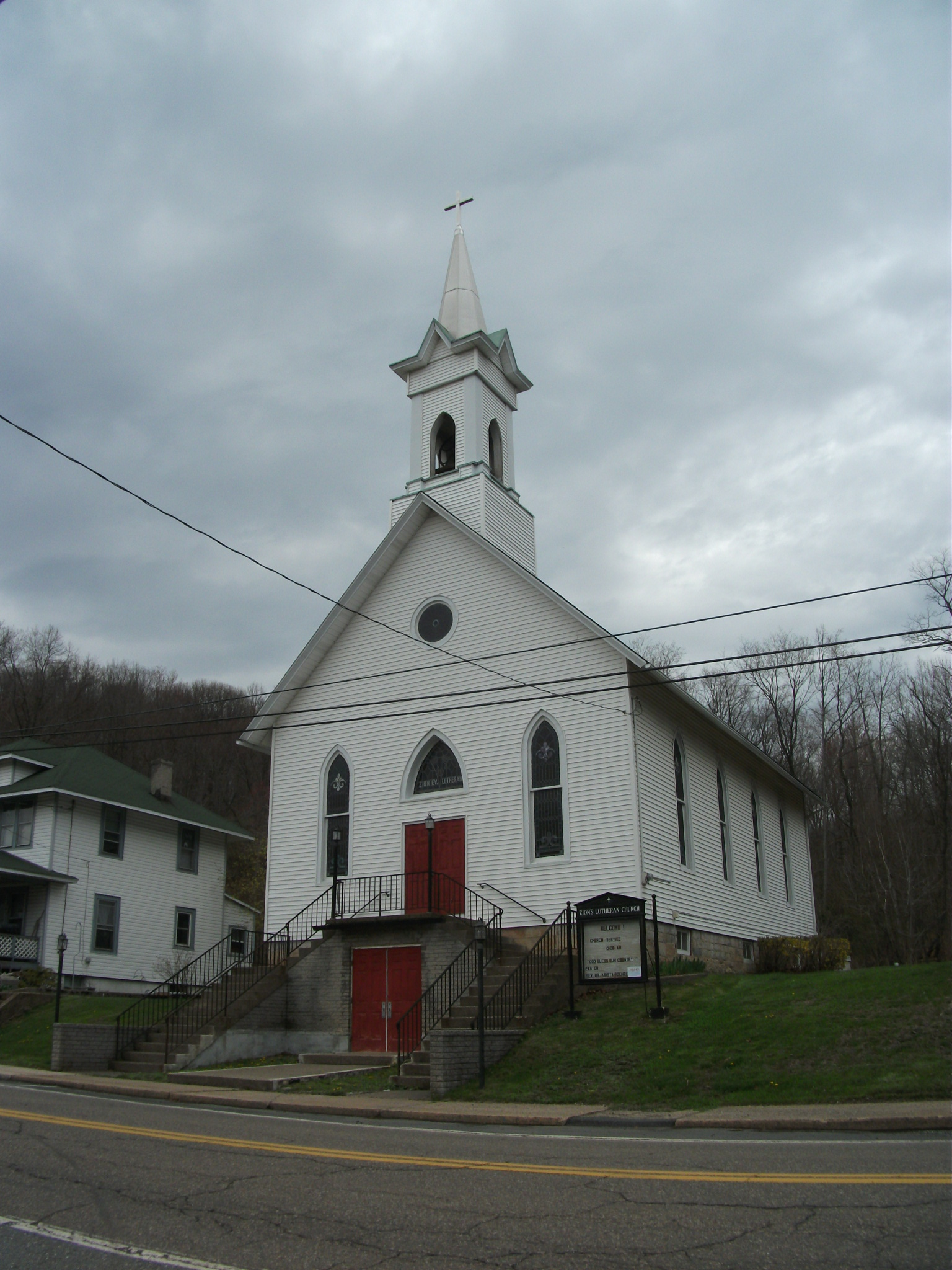
- Zions Lutheran Church

- Location within the U.S. state of Pennsylvania Donaldson (the United States)
- Coordinates: 40°38′9″N 76°24′20″W
- Country: United States
- State: Pennsylvania
- County: Schuylkill

Area
  - Total: 0.19 sq mi (0.49 km^{2})
  - Land: 0.19 sq mi (0.49 km^{2})
  - Water: 0 sq mi (0.00 km^{2})

Population (2020)
  - Total: 377
  - Density: 1,998.1/sq mi (771.47/km^{2})
- Time zone: UTC-5 (Eastern (EST))
  - Summer (DST): UTC-4 (EDT)
- FIPS code: 42-19432

Donaldson is a census-designated place (CDP) in Frailey Township, Schuylkill County, Pennsylvania, United States. The population was 325 at the 2000 census.

== Geography ==
Donaldson is located at 40°38′9″N 76°24′20″W (40.635945, -76.405545).

According to the United States Census Bureau, the CDP has a total area of 0.1 square miles (0.26 km^{2}), all land.

== Demographics ==
Historical population
Census	Pop.	Note	%±
2020	377		—
U.S. Decennial Census

At the 2000 census there were 325 people, 128 households, and 86 families living in the CDP. The population density was 2,978.6 inhabitants per square mile (1,150.0/km^{2}). There were 148 housing units at an average density of 1,356.4 per square mile (523.7/km^{2}). The racial makeup of the CDP was 99.38% White, 0.31% Asian, and 0.31% from two or more races. Hispanic or Latino of any race were 0.31%.

Of the 128 households 32.0% had children under the age of 18 living with them, 52.3% were married couples living together, 7.0% had a female householder with no husband present, and 32.8% were non-families. 27.3% of households were one person and 13.3% were one person aged 65 or older. The average household size was 2.54 and the average family size was 3.10.

The age distribution was 27.1% under the age of 18, 6.8% from 18 to 24, 24.6% from 25 to 44, 22.8% from 45 to 64, and 18.8% 65 or older. The median age was 37 years. For every 100 females, there were 99.4 males. For every 100 females age 18 and over, there were 100.8 males.

The median household income was $30,750 and the median family income was $33,750. Males had a median income of $29,750 versus $18,977 for females. The per capita income for the CDP was $12,455. About 5.0% of families and 5.0% of the population were below the poverty line, including 2.2% of those under age 18 and 1.9% of those age 65 or over.

== Education ==
The school district is Pine Grove Area School District.
