= Newtown, Schuylkill County, Pennsylvania =

Unincorporated community in Pennsylvania, US

Newtown
- Census-designated place
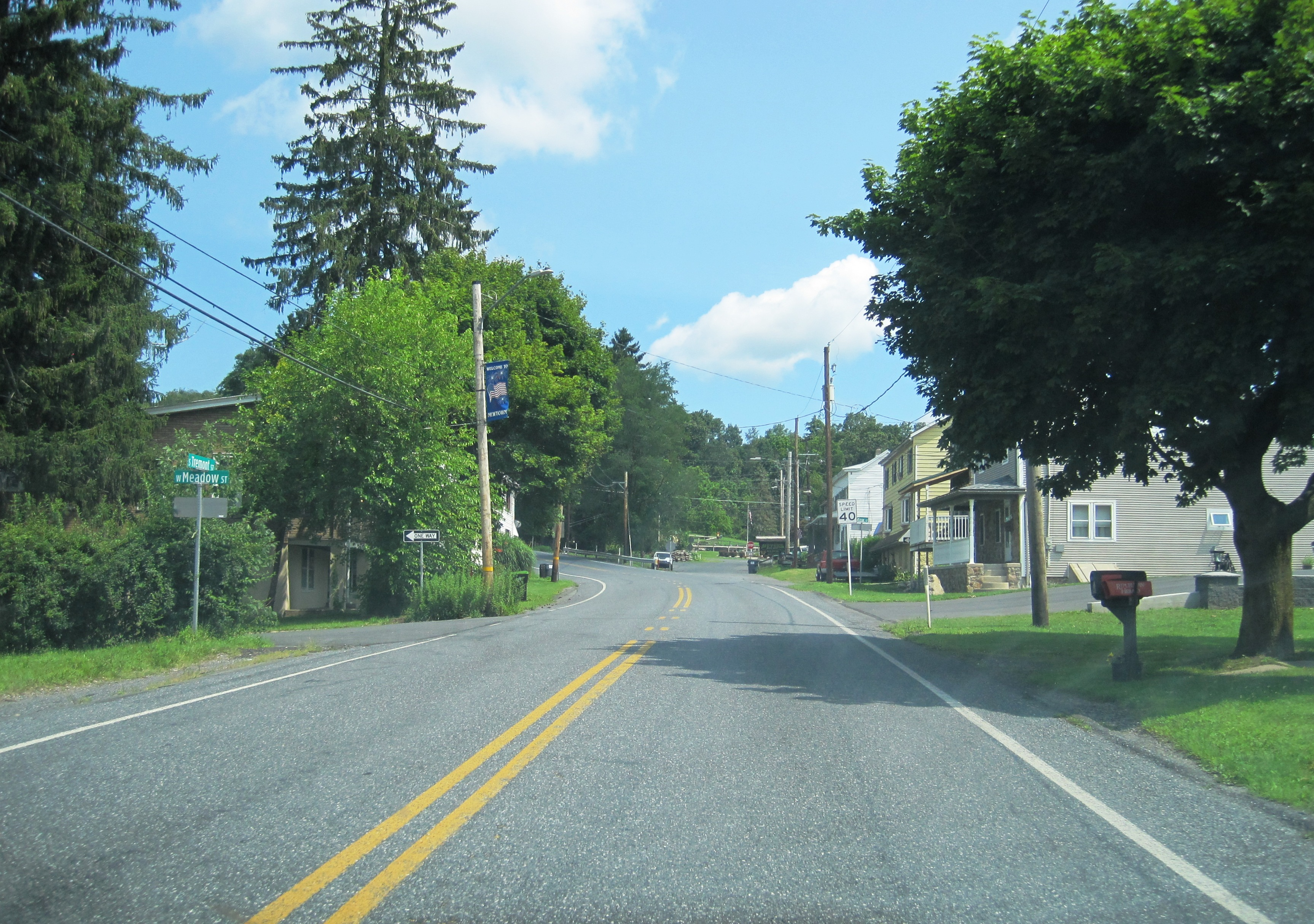
- Newtown along US 209

- Location within the state of Pennsylvania Newtown (the United States)
- Coordinates: 40°39′6″N 76°20′52″W
- Country: United States
- State: Pennsylvania
- County: Schuylkill

Area
  - Total: 0.66 sq mi (1.7 km^{2})
  - Land: 0.66 sq mi (1.7 km^{2})

Population (2000)
  - Total: 244
  - Density: 370/sq mi (140/km^{2})
- Time zone: UTC-5 (Eastern (EST))
  - Summer (DST): UTC-4 (EDT)

Newtown is a census-designated place (CDP) in Reilly Township, Schuylkill County in the U.S. state of Pennsylvania. The population was 244 at the 2000 census.

== Geography ==
Newtown is located at 40°39′6″N 76°20′52″W (40.651714, -76.347837).

According to the United States Census Bureau, the CDP has a total area of 0.6 square miles (1.7 km^{2}), all land.

== Demographics ==
At the 2000 census there were 244 people, 93 households, and 67 families in the CDP. The population density was 376.4 inhabitants per square mile (145.3/km^{2}). There were 99 housing units at an average density of 152.7 per square mile (59.0/km^{2}). The racial makeup of the CDP was 100.00% White. Of the 93 households 38.7% had children under the age of 18 living with them, 63.4% were married couples living together, 6.5% had a female householder with no husband present, and 26.9% were non-families. 20.4% of households were one person and 16.1% were one person aged 65 or older. The average household size was 2.62 and the average family size was 3.09.

The age distribution was 25.4% under the age of 18, 8.2% from 18 to 24, 29.5% from 25 to 44, 19.7% from 45 to 64, and 17.2% 65 or older. The median age was 36 years. For every 100 females, there were 98.4 males. For every 100 females age 18 and over, there were 95.7 males.

The median household income was $32,344 and the median family income was $43,125. Males had a median income of $32,083 versus $20,536 for females. The per capita income for the CDP was $14,722. About 3.2% of families and 1.8% of the population were below the poverty line, including 4.0% of those under the age of eighteen and none of those sixty five or over.

== Education ==
The school district is Minersville Area School District.
