= Cass Township, Schuylkill County, Pennsylvania =

Township in Pennsylvania, US

Coordinates: 40°45′06″N 76°16′29″W

- Township
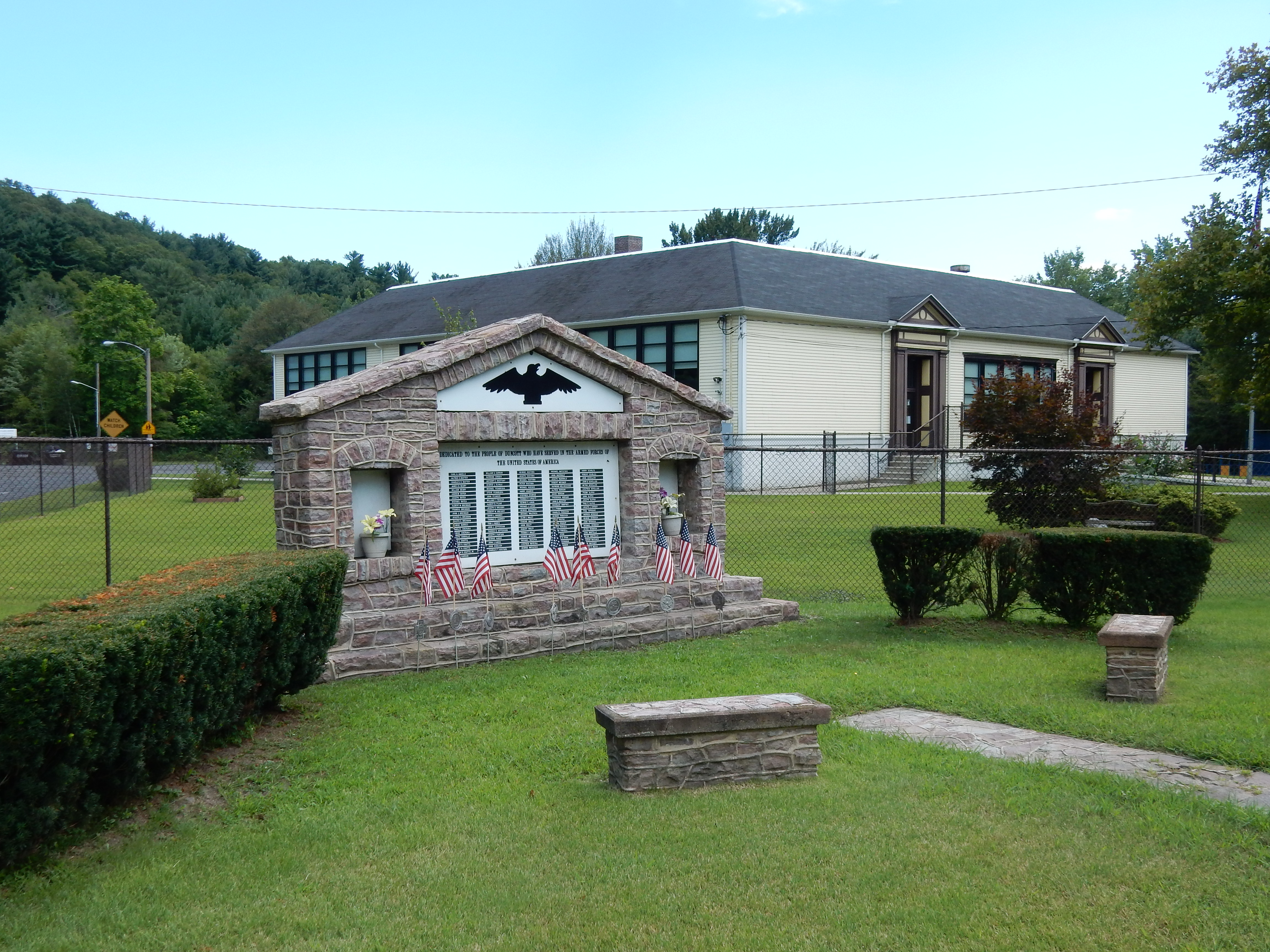
- Cass Township Municipal Bldg. and War Memorial.

- Logo

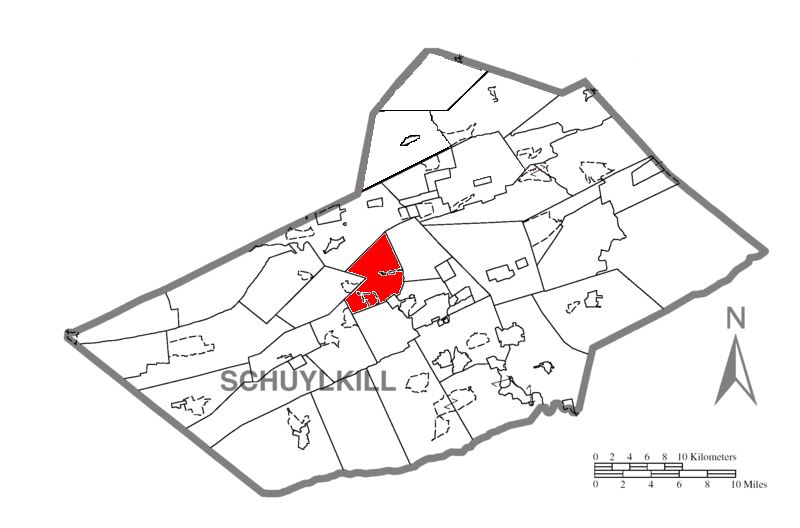
- Location of Cass Township in Schuylkill County, Pennsylvania

- Location of Schuylkill County, Pennsylvania in Pennsylvania
- Country: United States
- State: Pennsylvania
- County: Schuylkill
- Incorporated: 1848

Area
  - Total: 14.44 sq mi (37.39 km^{2})
  - Land: 14.39 sq mi (37.26 km^{2})
  - Water: 0.046 sq mi (0.12 km^{2})

Population (2020)
  - Total: 1,760 ▼
  - Estimate (2023): 1,763
  - Density: 132.2/sq mi (51.04/km^{2})
- Time zone: UTC-5 (Eastern (EST))
  - Summer (DST): UTC-4 (EDT)
- FIPS code: 42-107-11608
- Website: http://www.casstownship.org/

Cass Township is a township in Schuylkill County, Pennsylvania, United States. Formed in 1848 from part of Branch Township, it is named for Lewis Cass.

== Geography ==
According to the U.S. Census Bureau, the township has a total area of 14.0 square miles (36 km^{2}), of which 14.0 square miles (36 km^{2}) is land and 0.04 square miles (0.10 km^{2}) (0.29%) is water. It contains the census-designated places of Duncott, Forestville, and Heckscherville.

== Demographics ==
Historical population
Census	Pop.	Note	%±
2010	1,958		—
2020	1,760		−10.1%
2023 (est.)	1,763		0.2%
U.S. Decennial Census

As of the census of 2000, there were 2,383 people, 779 households, and 525 families residing in the township. The population density was 170.7 inhabitants per square mile (65.9/km^{2}). There were 848 housing units at an average density of 60.7 per square mile (23.4/km^{2}). The racial makeup of the township was 89.17% White, 10.20% African American, 0.25% Asian, 0.13% from other races, and 0.25% from two or more races. Hispanic or Latino of any race were 4.20% of the population.

There were 779 households, out of which 25.5% had children under the age of 18 living with them, 51.7% were married couples living together, 10.9% had a female householder with no husband present, and 32.6% were non-families. 28.9% of all households were made up of individuals, and 15.9% had someone living alone who was 65 years of age or older. The average household size was 2.36 and the average family size was 2.91.

In the township the population was spread out, with 15.1% under the age of 18, 7.0% from 18 to 24, 34.0% from 25 to 44, 26.1% from 45 to 64, and 17.8% who were 65 years of age or older. The median age was 41 years. For every 100 females there were 156.2 males. For every 100 females age 18 and over, there were 164.2 males.

The median income for a household in the township was $31,792, and the median income for a family was $39,028. Males had a median income of $26,786 versus $20,982 for females. The per capita income for the township was $15,389. About 9.3% of families and 12.5% of the population were below the poverty line, including 19.3% of those under age 18 and 13.7% of those age 65 or over.

Cass Township has the highest percentage of people of Ukrainian ancestry (14.30%) in the United States.

== Sports history ==
The 1957 Cass Township, high school football team exclusively used single-wing offense, now referred to as "wildcat" . The Cass (Schuylkill County) PA Condors rolled through a season unbeaten, untied, and unscored upon over 50 years ago, going 9–0 in the regular season before defeating Shamokin 2–0 in a special playoff on December 7, 1957 held in Pottsville, for the Eastern Conference Southern Division Class A title for a season of 10–0. They are the only known high school football team in Pennsylvania that can lay claim to being unbeaten, untied, and unscored upon. The Cass Twp Condors blanked Minersville, Nescopeck, West Mahanoy Township, Schuylkill Haven, Ashland, Blythe Township, Mahanoy Township, Lansford and Saint Clair, and then Shamokin in the playoff game (2-0).

Harry Butsko is the only known Cass Twp resident to play football in the National Football League, playing for the Washington Redskins in 1963.

== Gallery ==
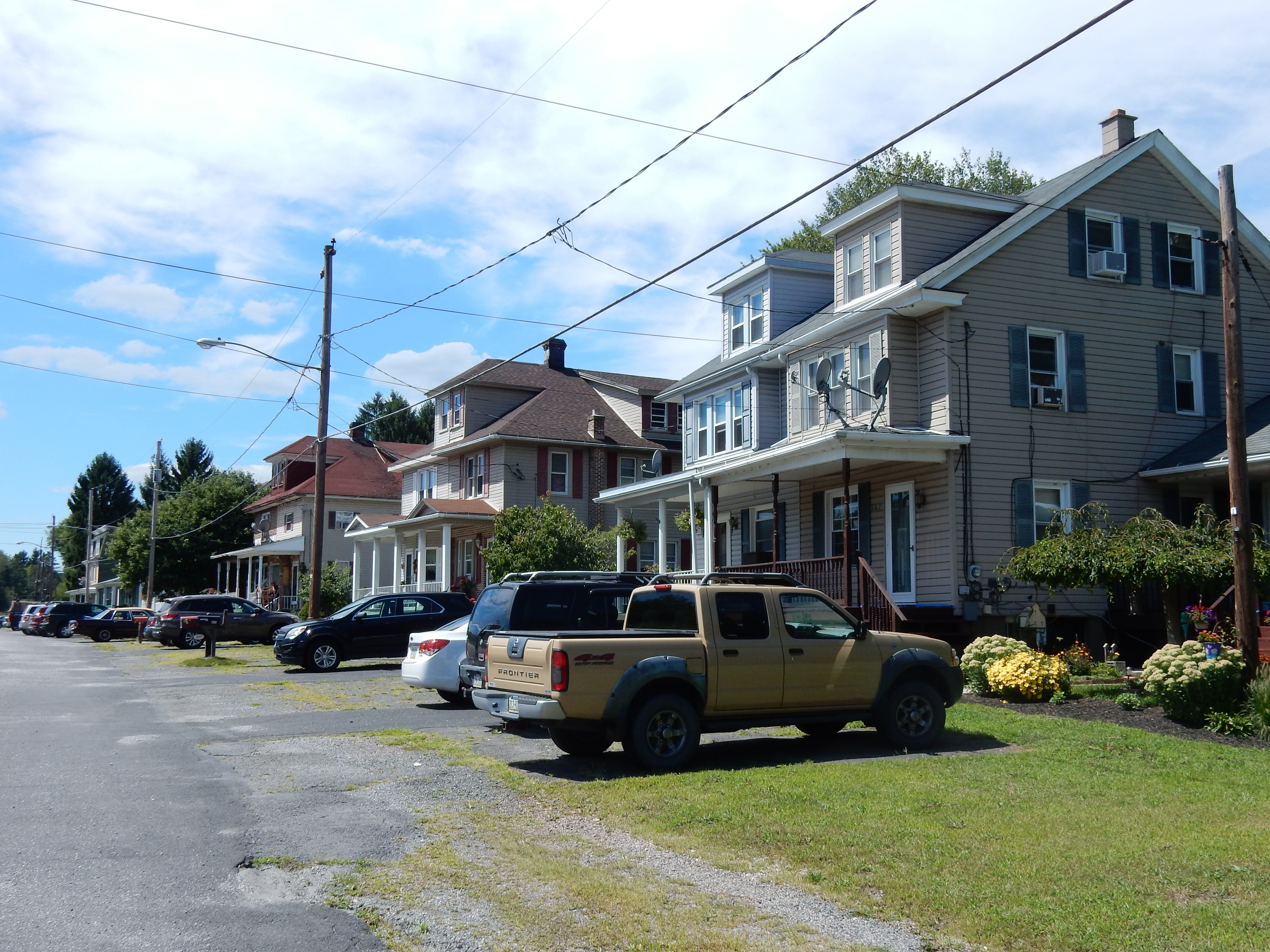
Valley Road in Cass Township.

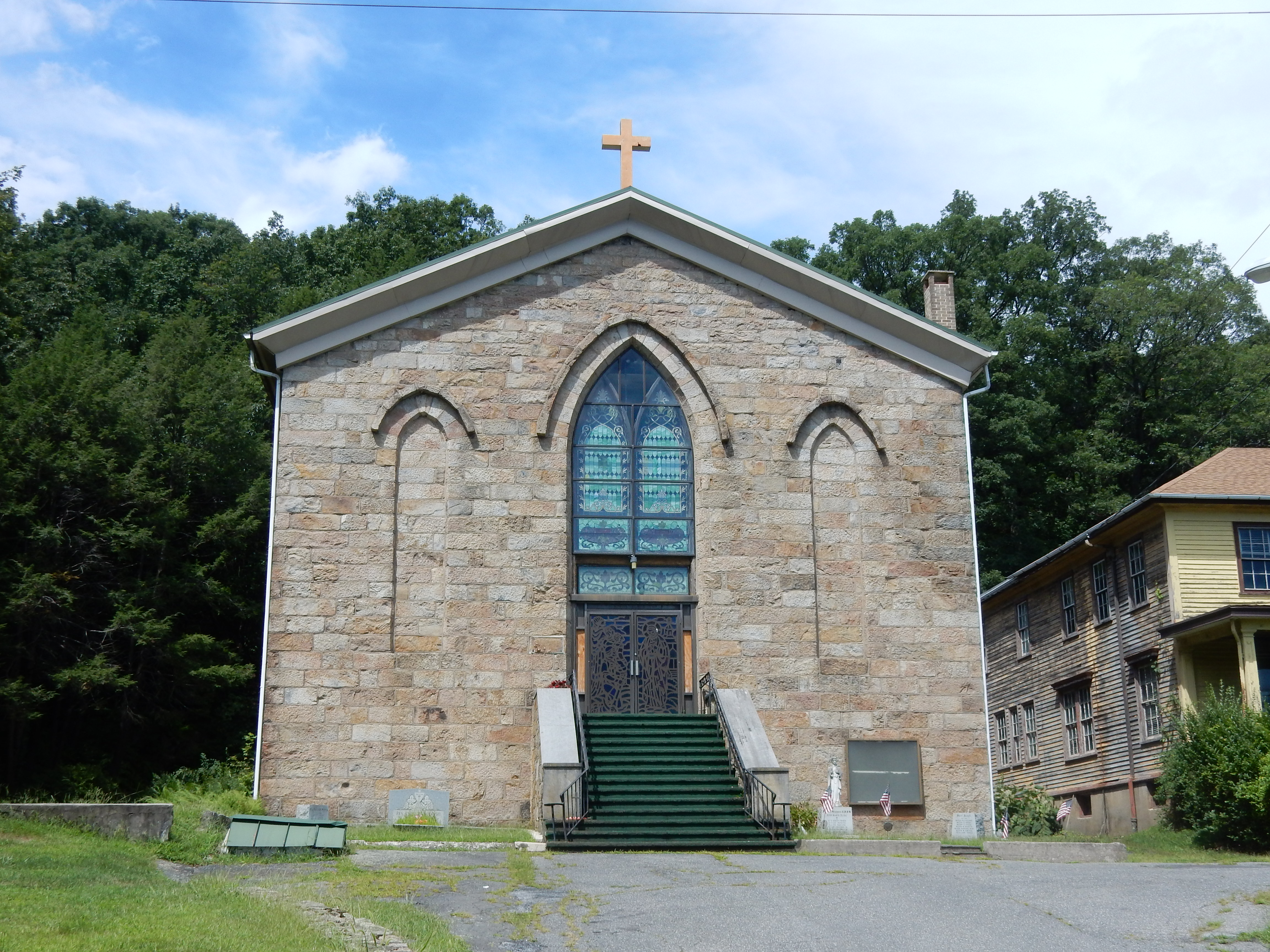
St. Kierans Church in Heckscherville.

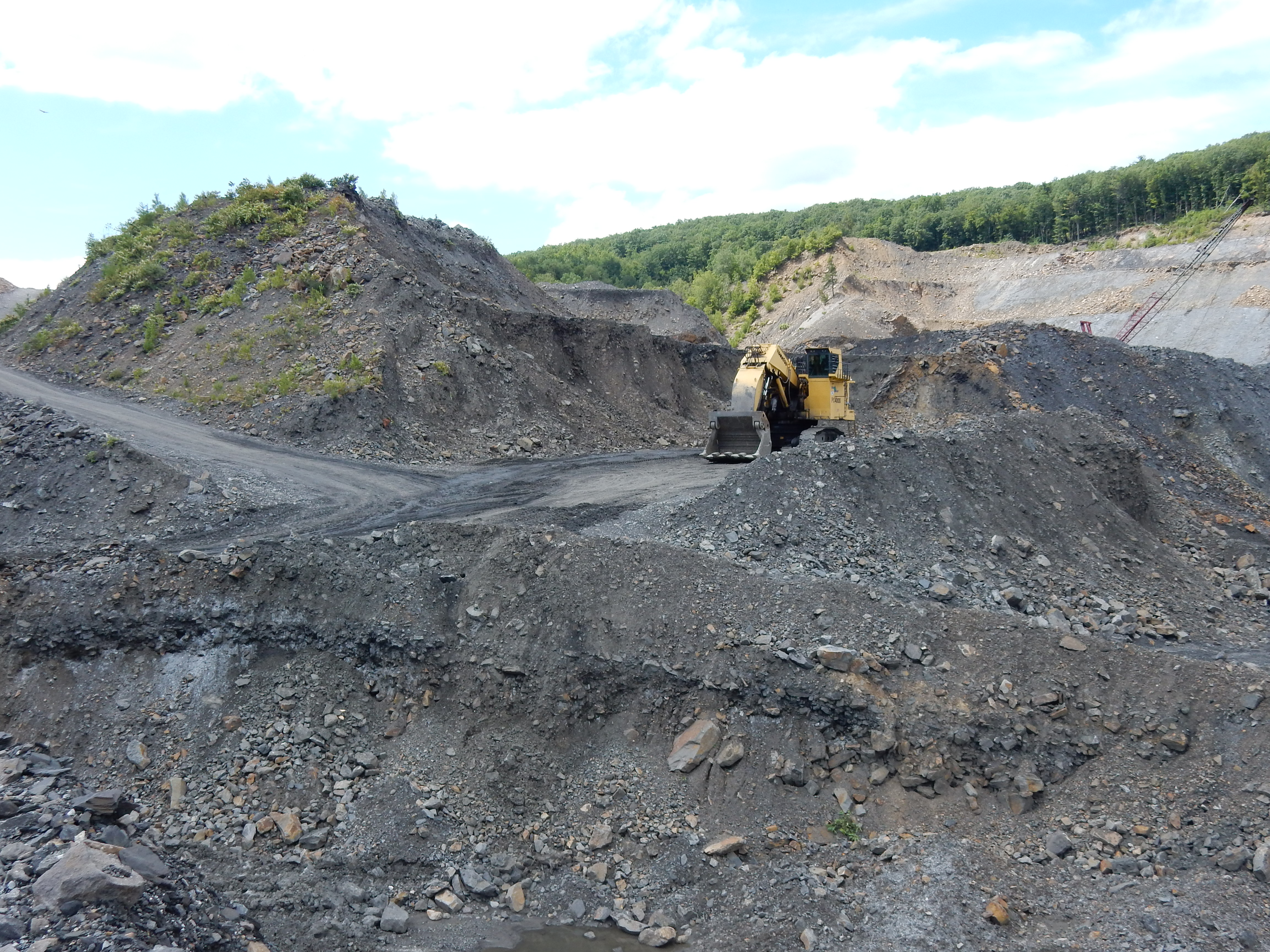
Coal mining.
