= Tremont Township, Pennsylvania =

Township in Pennsylvania, US

Coordinates: 40°34′00″N 76°30′59″W

- Township
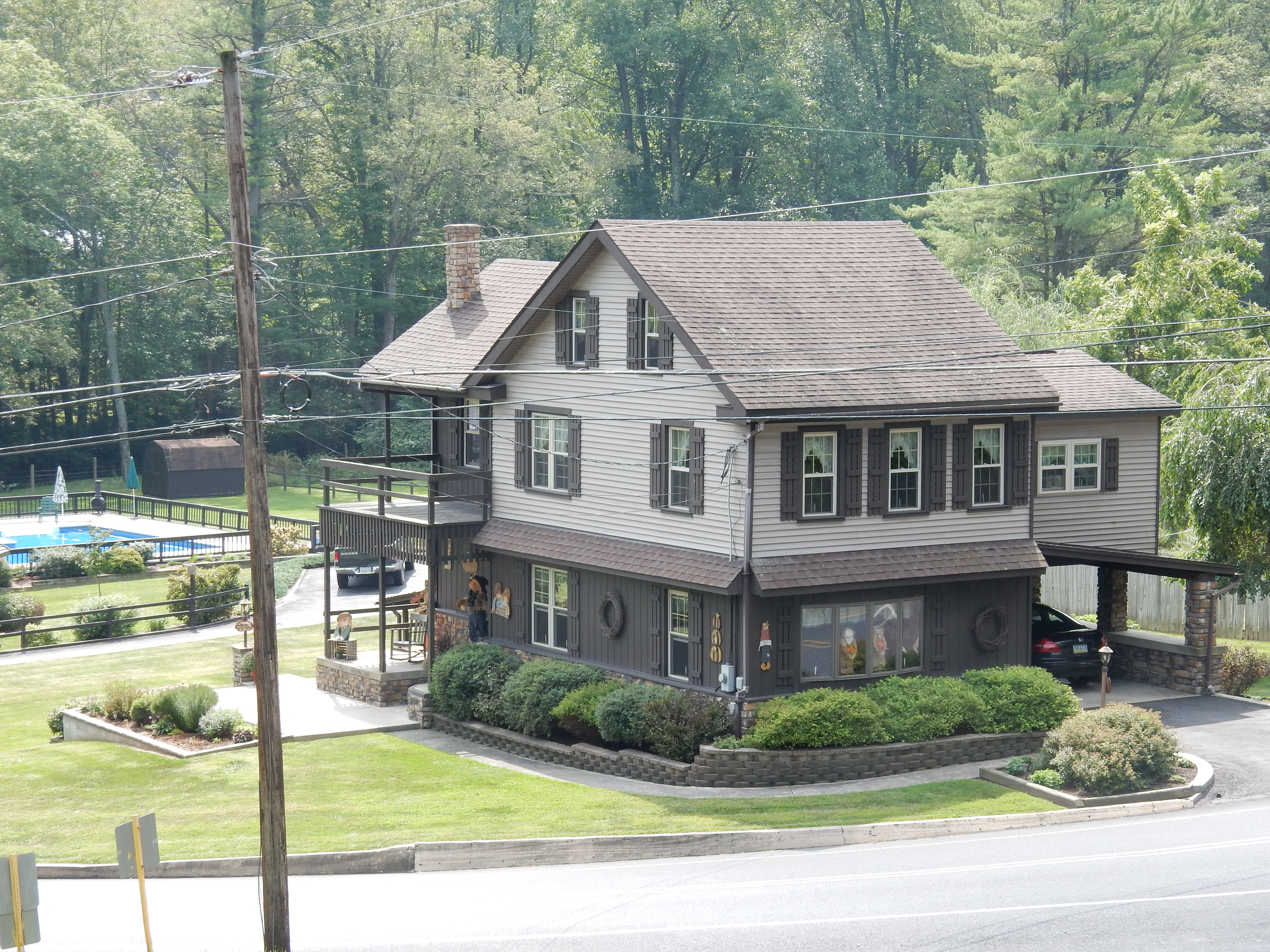
- Residence on Molleystown Road, Tremont Township

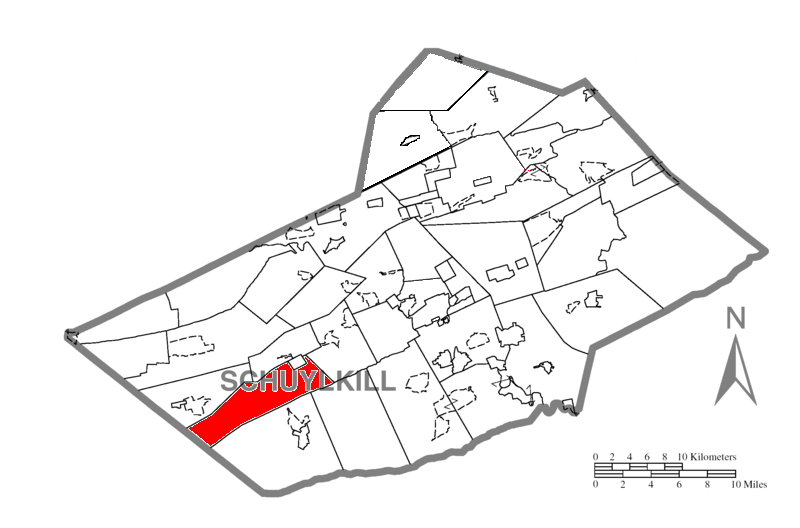
- Map of Schuylkill County, Pennsylvania Highlighting Tremont Township

- Map of Schuylkill County, Pennsylvania
- Country: United States
- State: Pennsylvania
- County: Schuylkill
- Settled: 1816
- Incorporated: 1847

Area
  - Total: 24.18 sq mi (62.63 km^{2})
  - Land: 24.18 sq mi (62.63 km^{2})
  - Water: 0 sq mi (0.00 km^{2})

Population (2020)
  - Total: 280
  - Estimate (2021): 280
  - Density: 11.3/sq mi (4.36/km^{2})
- Time zone: UTC-5 (Eastern (EST))
  - Summer (DST): UTC-4 (EDT)
- FIPS code: 42-107-77400

Tremont Township is a township that is located in Schuylkill County, Pennsylvania, United States. The population was 280 at the time of the 2020 census.

== Geography ==
According to the United States Census Bureau, the township has a total area of 23.3 square miles (60.4 km^{2}), all land.

== Demographics ==
Historical population
Census	Pop.	Note	%±
2010	280		—
2020	280		0.0%
2021 (est.)	280		0.0%
U.S. Decennial Census

At the time of the 2000 census, there were 250 people, 95 households, and 72 families living in this township.

The population density was 10.7 people per square mile (4.1/km^{2}). There were one hundred housing units at an average density of 4.3/sq mi (1.7/km^{2}).

The racial makeup of the township was 99.60% White, and 0.40% from two or more races.

Of the ninety-five households within this township, 31.6% had children who were under the age of eighteen living with them, 61.1% were married couples living together, 8.4% had a female householder with no husband present, and 24.2% were non-families. In addition, 16.8% of households were one-person households and 10.5% were one-person households with residents who were aged sixty-five or older.

The average household size was 2.60 and the average family size was 2.86.

The age distribution was 22.8% of residents who were under the age of eighteen, 8.8% who were aged eighteen to twenty-four, 26.4% who were aged twenty-five to forty-four, 30.4% who were aged forty-five to sixty-four, and 11.6% who were aged sixty-five or older. The median age was thirty-eight years.

For every one hundred females, there were 108.3 males. For every one hundred females who were aged eighteen or older, there were 96.9 males.

The median household income was $34,000 and the median family income was $44,375. Males had a median income of $30,833 compared with that of $24,375 for females.

The per capita income for the township was $16,573.

Approximately 2.8% of families and 9.4% of the population were living below the poverty line, including 2.2% of those who were under the age of eighteen and 8.0% of those who were aged sixty-five or older.

== Gallery ==
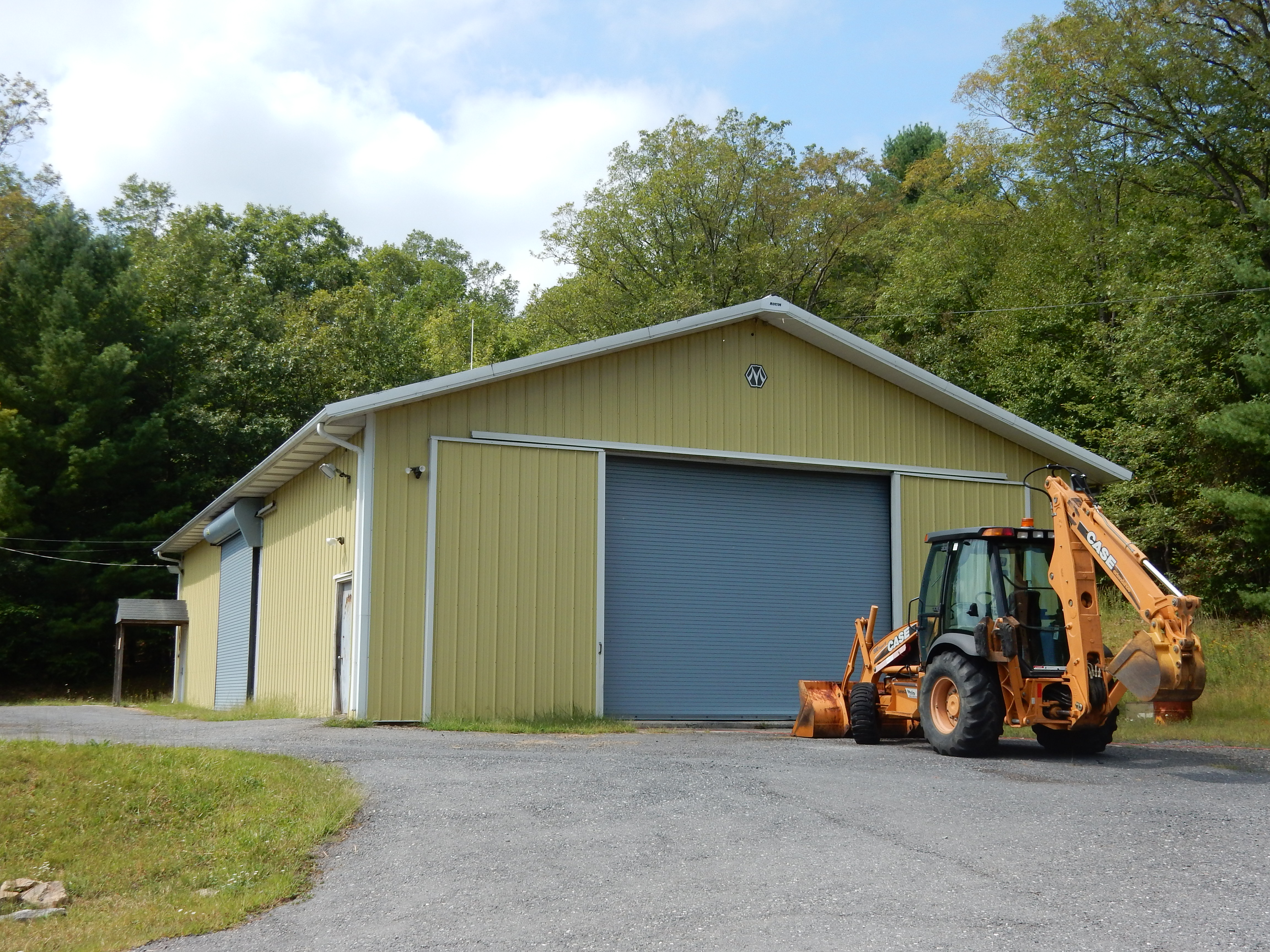
Tremont Township Municipal Building

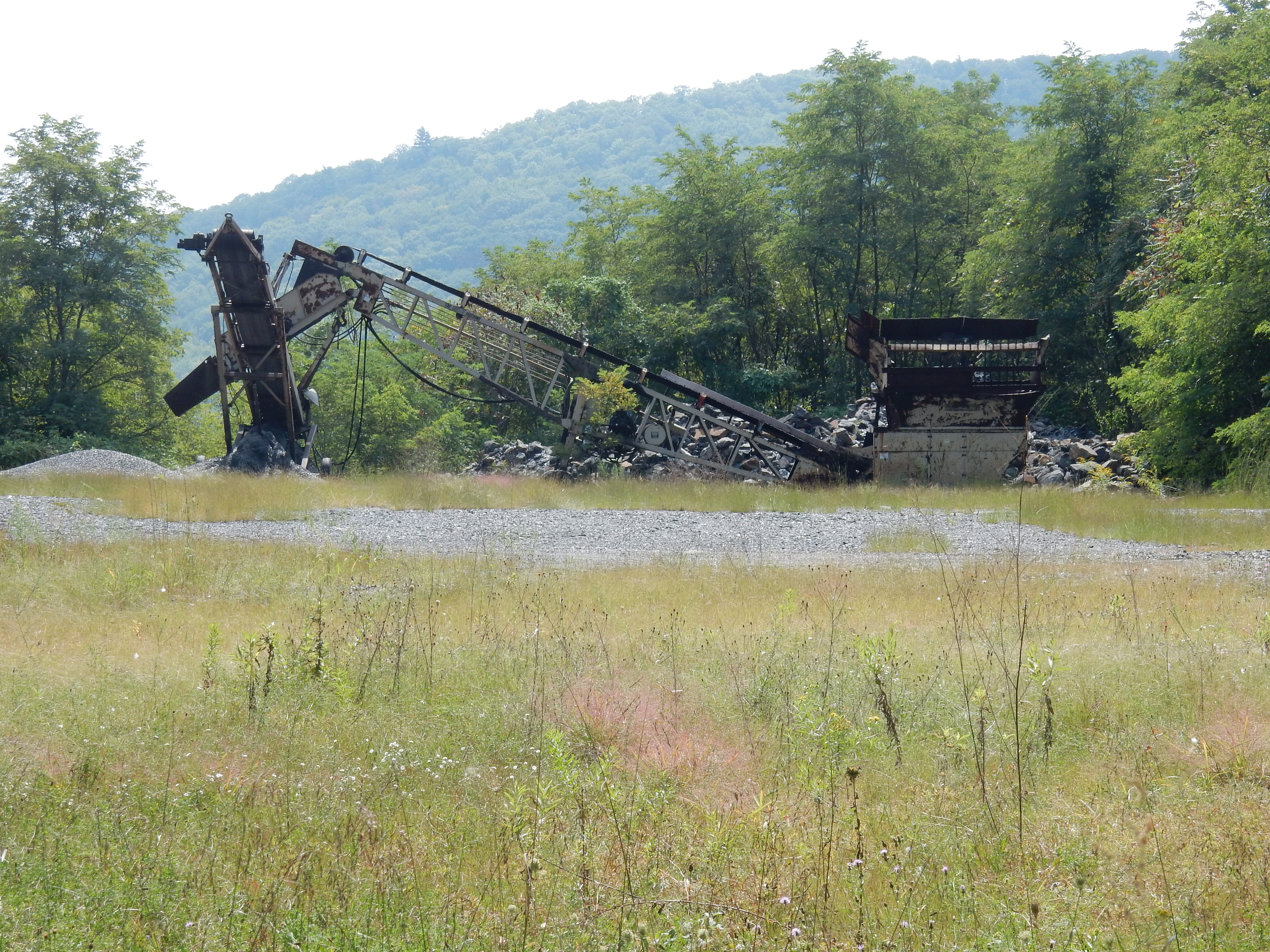
Meadowbrook Coal Company
