= Hubley Township, Pennsylvania =

Township in Pennsylvania, US

Coordinates: 40°37′00″N 76°37′59″W

- Township
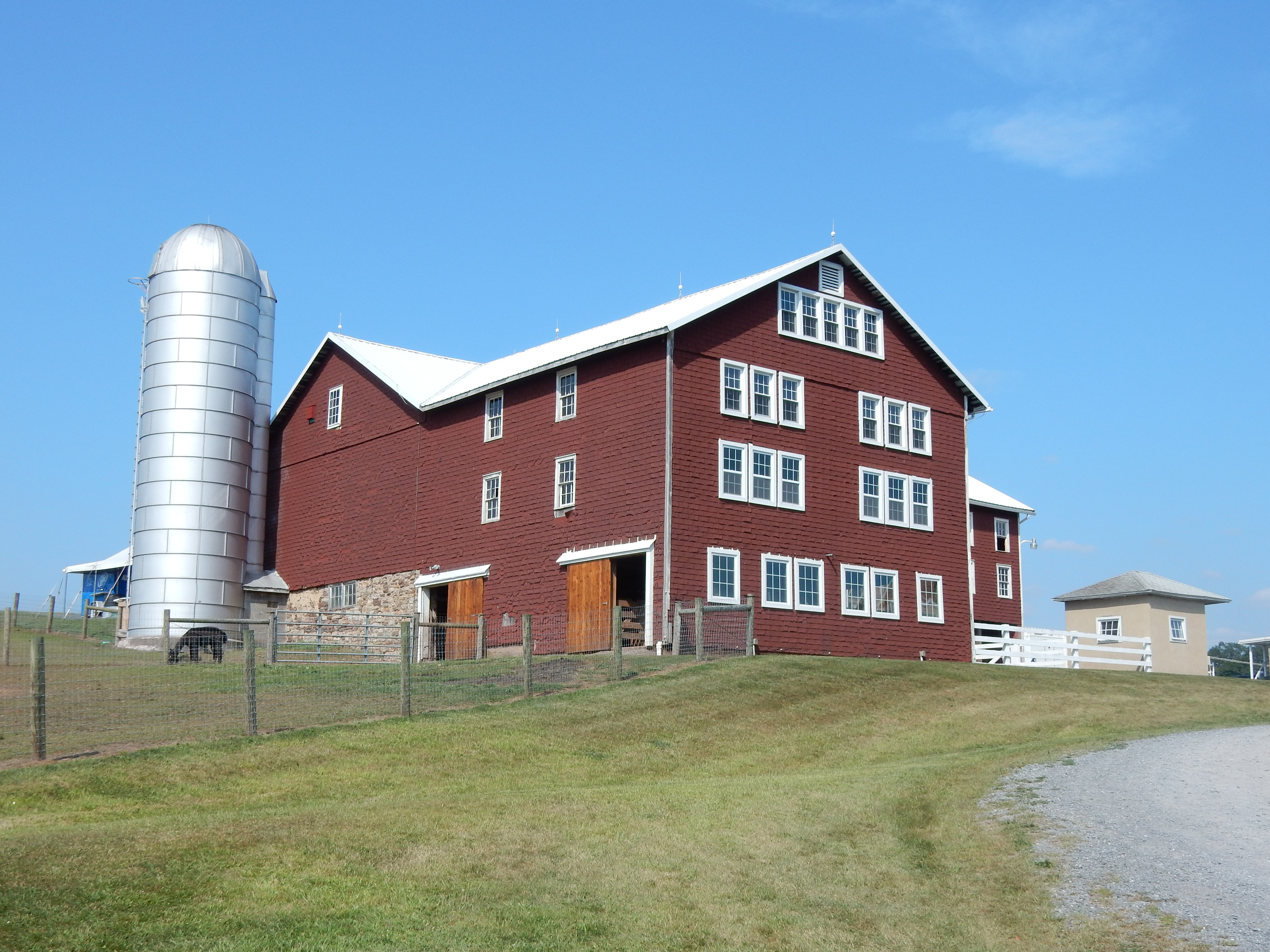
- Farm on Schwenks Road, Hubley Township.

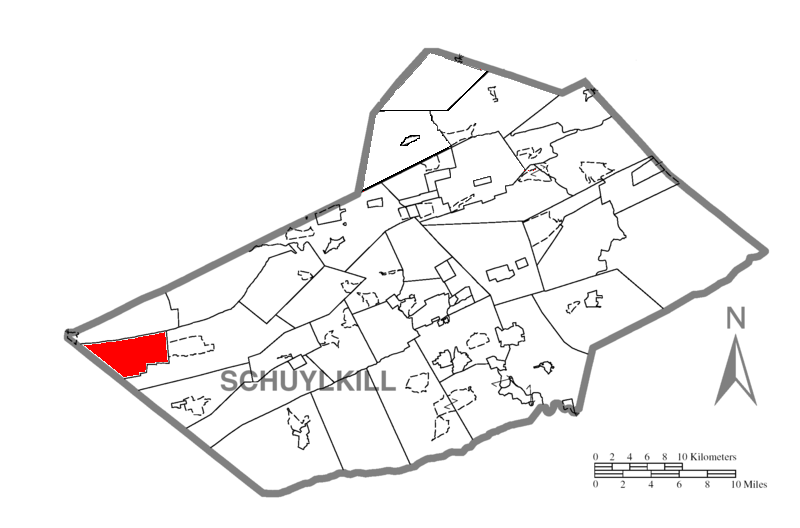
- Map of Schuylkill County, Pennsylvania Highlighting Hubley Township

- Map of Schuylkill County, Pennsylvania
- Country: United States
- State: Pennsylvania
- County: Schuylkill
- Settled: 1804
- Incorporated: 1853

Area
  - Total: 13.32 sq mi (34.51 km^{2})
  - Land: 13.32 sq mi (34.51 km^{2})
  - Water: 0 sq mi (0.00 km^{2})

Population (2020)
  - Total: 862 ▲
  - Estimate (2023): 879
  - Density: 63.6/sq mi (24.55/km^{2})
- Time zone: UTC-5 (Eastern (EST))
  - Summer (DST): UTC-4 (EDT)
- FIPS code: 42-107-36072

Hubley Township is a township in Schuylkill County, Pennsylvania, United States. The population was 862 at the 2020 census, an increase of a little more than 1% from the previous census in 2010.

== Geography ==
According to the United States Census Bureau, the township has a total area of 13.1 square miles (34 km^{2}), all land.

== Demographics ==
Historical population
Census	Pop.	Note	%±
2000	889		—
2010	854		−3.9%
2020	862		0.9%
2023 (est.)	879		2.0%
U.S. Decennial Census

At the 2000 census there were 889 people, 345 households, and 260 families living in the township. The population density was 68.0 inhabitants per square mile (26.3/km^{2}). There were 369 housing units at an average density of 28.2 per square mile (10.9/km^{2}). The racial makeup of the township was 99.21% White, 0.22% African American, 0.11% Asian, 0.22% Pacific Islander, 0.11% from other races, and 0.11% from two or more races. Hispanic or Latino of any race were 1.12%.

Of the 345 households 29.6% had children under the age of 18 living with them, 66.7% were married couples living together, 5.8% had a female householder with no husband present, and 24.6% were non-families. 21.2% of households were one person and 11.9% were one person aged 65 or older. The average household size was 2.58 and the average family size was 2.98.

The age distribution was 21.7% under the age of 18, 6.7% from 18 to 24, 28.3% from 25 to 44, 23.3% from 45 to 64, and 19.9% 65 or older. The median age was 41 years. For every 100 females, there were 107.7 males. For every 100 females age 18 and over, there were 102.3 males.

The median household income was $41,250 and the median family income was $46,538. Males had a median income of $32,734 versus $24,375 for females. The per capita income for the township was $17,377. About 4.2% of families and 5.7% of the population were below the poverty line, including 4.6% of those under age 18 and 7.9% of those age 65 or over.

== Gallery ==
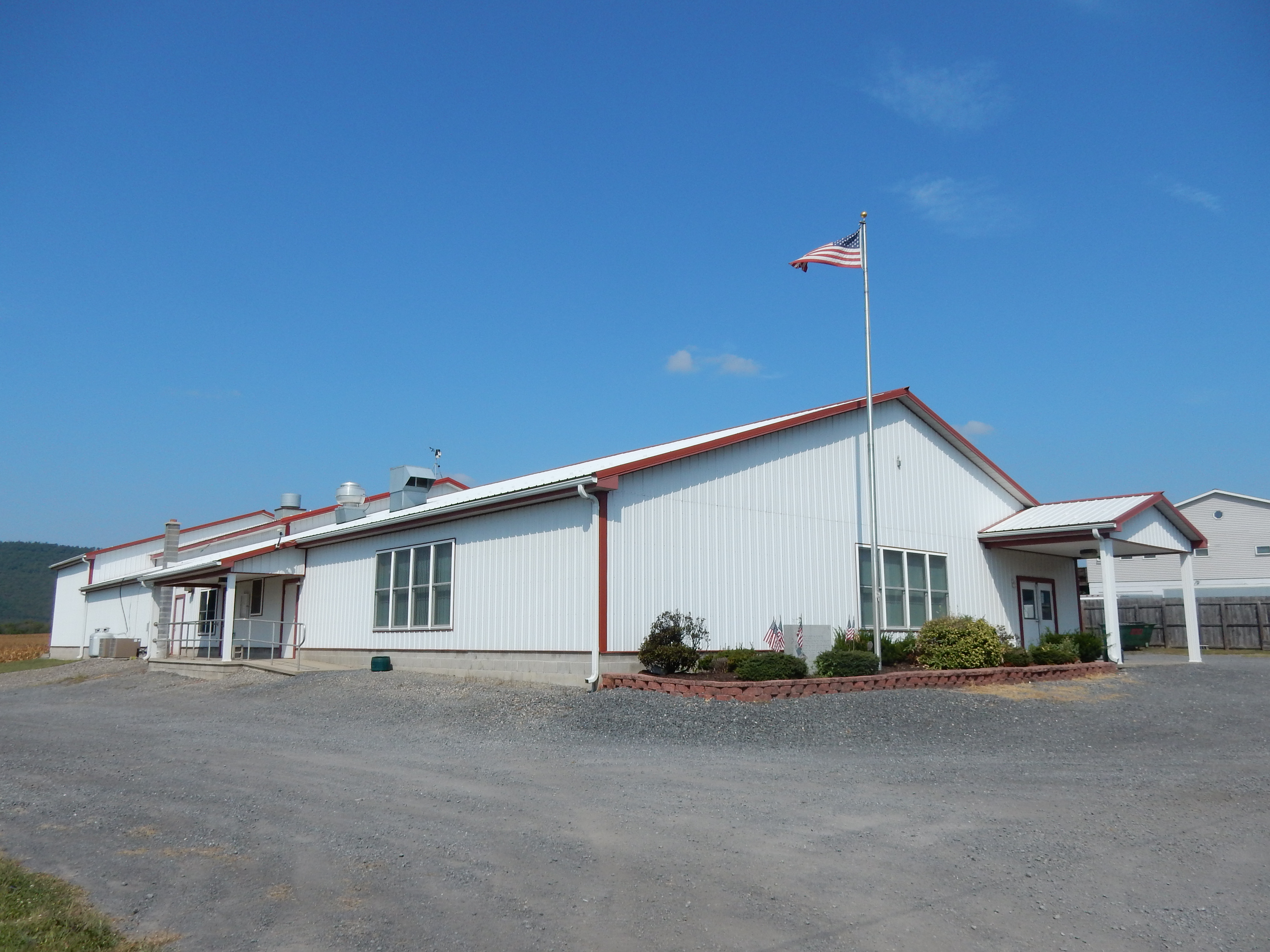
Hubley Township Bldg.

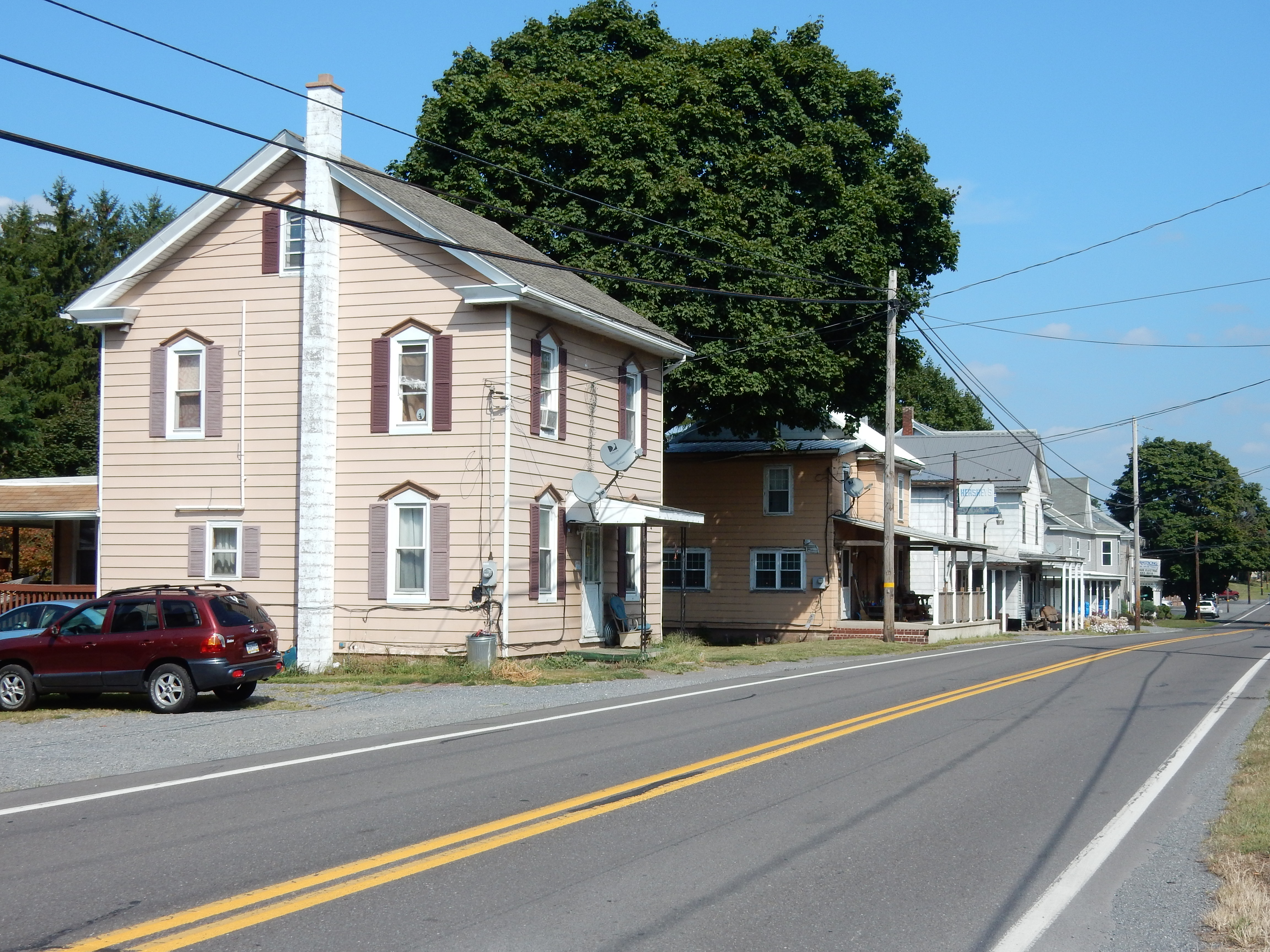
Main Street in Sacramento.

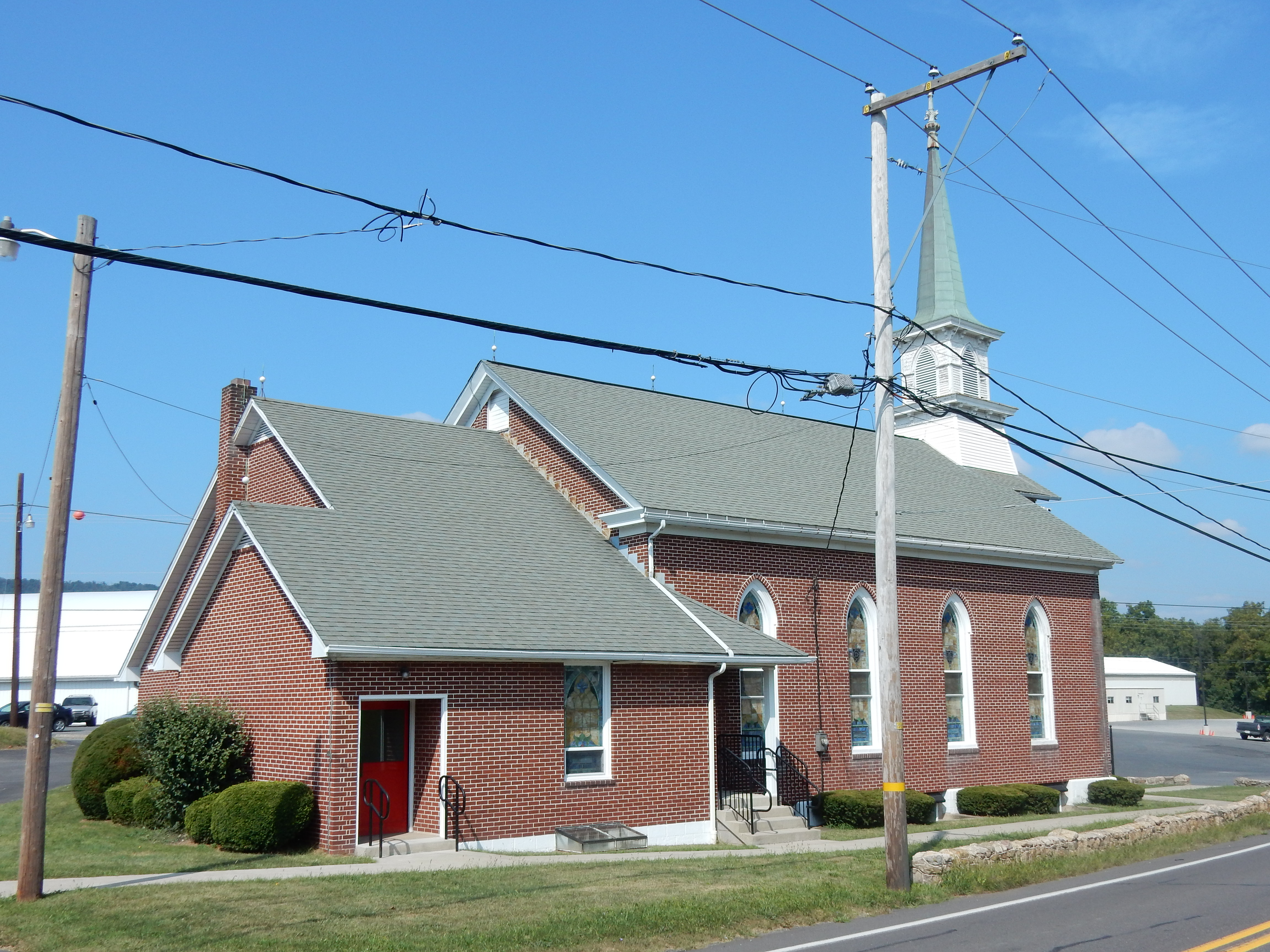
St. Paul's United Church of Christ in Sacramento.
