= Frailey Township, Pennsylvania =

Township in Pennsylvania, US

Coordinates: 40°37′20″N 76°26′59″W

- Township
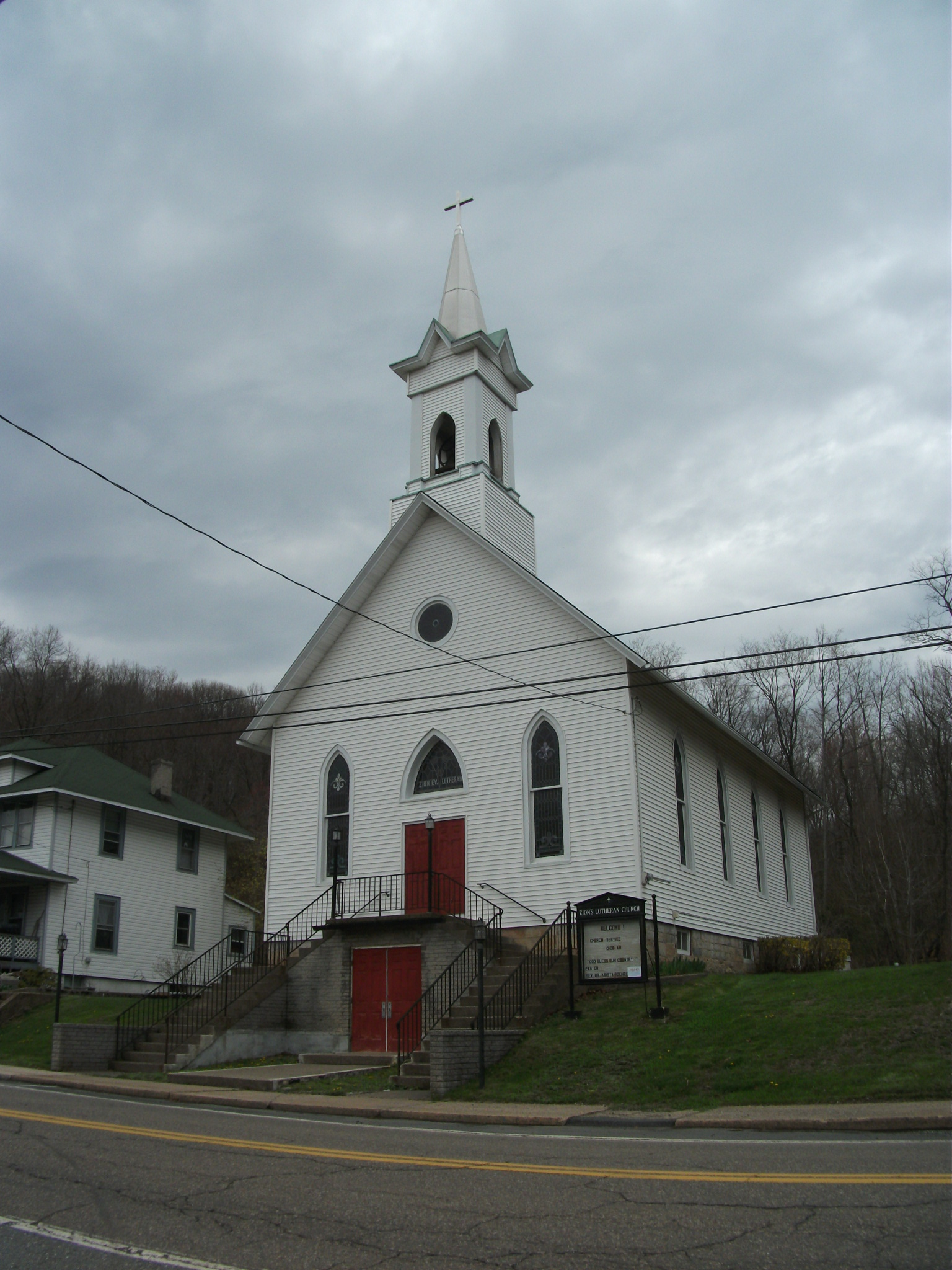
- Donaldson is within the township

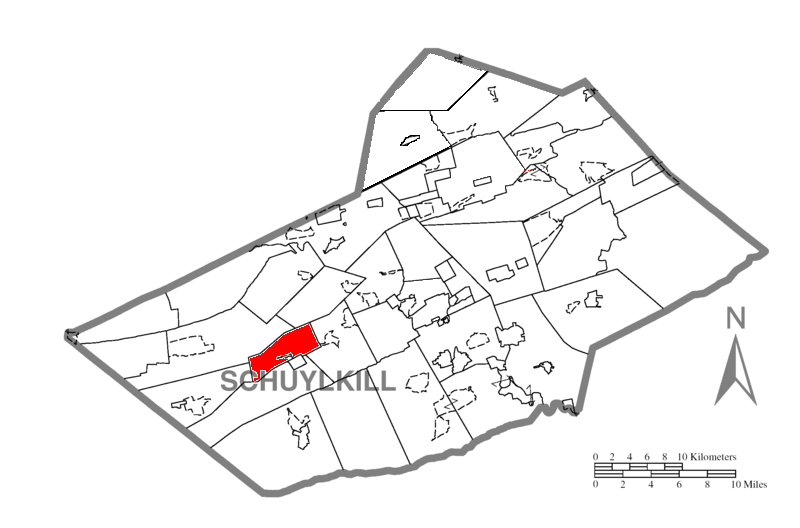
- Map of Schuylkill County, Pennsylvania Highlighting Frailey Township

- Map of Schuylkill County, Pennsylvania
- Country: United States
- State: Pennsylvania
- County: Schuylkill
- Incorporated: 1847

Area
  - Total: 9.18 sq mi (23.77 km^{2})
  - Land: 9.15 sq mi (23.69 km^{2})
  - Water: 0.031 sq mi (0.08 km^{2})

Population (2020)
  - Total: 420 ▼
  - Estimate (2023): 423
  - Density: 44.9/sq mi (17.35/km^{2})
- Time zone: UTC-5 (Eastern (EST))
  - Summer (DST): UTC-4 (EDT)
- FIPS code: 42-107-27248

Frailey Township is a township in Schuylkill County, Pennsylvania, United States. The population was 420 at the 2020 census.

== Geography ==
According to the United States Census Bureau, the township has a total area of 9.2 square miles (24 km^{2}), of which 9.1 square miles (24 km^{2}) is land and 0.04 square miles (0.10 km^{2}) (0.33%) is water. It contains the census-designated place of Donaldson.

== Demographics ==
Historical population
Census	Pop.	Note	%±
2010	429		—
2020	420		−2.1%
2023 (est.)	423		0.7%
U.S. Decennial Census

At the 2000 census there were 416 people, 162 households, and 109 families living in the township. The population density was 45.5 inhabitants per square mile (17.6/km^{2}). There were 187 housing units at an average density of 20.5/sq mi (7.9/km^{2}). The racial makeup of the township was 99.28% White, 0.48% Asian, and 0.24% from two or more races. Hispanic or Latino of any race were 0.48%.

Of the 162 households 32.7% had children under the age of 18 living with them, 51.2% were married couples living together, 9.3% had a female householder with no husband present, and 32.1% were non-families. 27.2% of households were one person and 14.2% were one person aged 65 or older. The average household size was 2.57 and the average family size was 3.13.

The age distribution was 26.2% under the age of 18, 7.5% from 18 to 24, 25.5% from 25 to 44, 21.6% from 45 to 64, and 19.2% 65 or older. The median age was 39 years. For every 100 females, there were 98.1 males. For every 100 females age 18 and over, there were 100.7 males.

The median household income was $32,679 and the median family income was $36,250. Males had a median income of $28,000 versus $19,327 for females. The per capita income for the township was $12,780. About 4.1% of families and 4.0% of the population were below the poverty line, including 1.9% of those under age 18 and 1.4% of those age 65 or over.
