= Reilly Township, Pennsylvania =

Township in Pennsylvania, US

Coordinates: 40°38′12″N 76°22′35″W

- Township
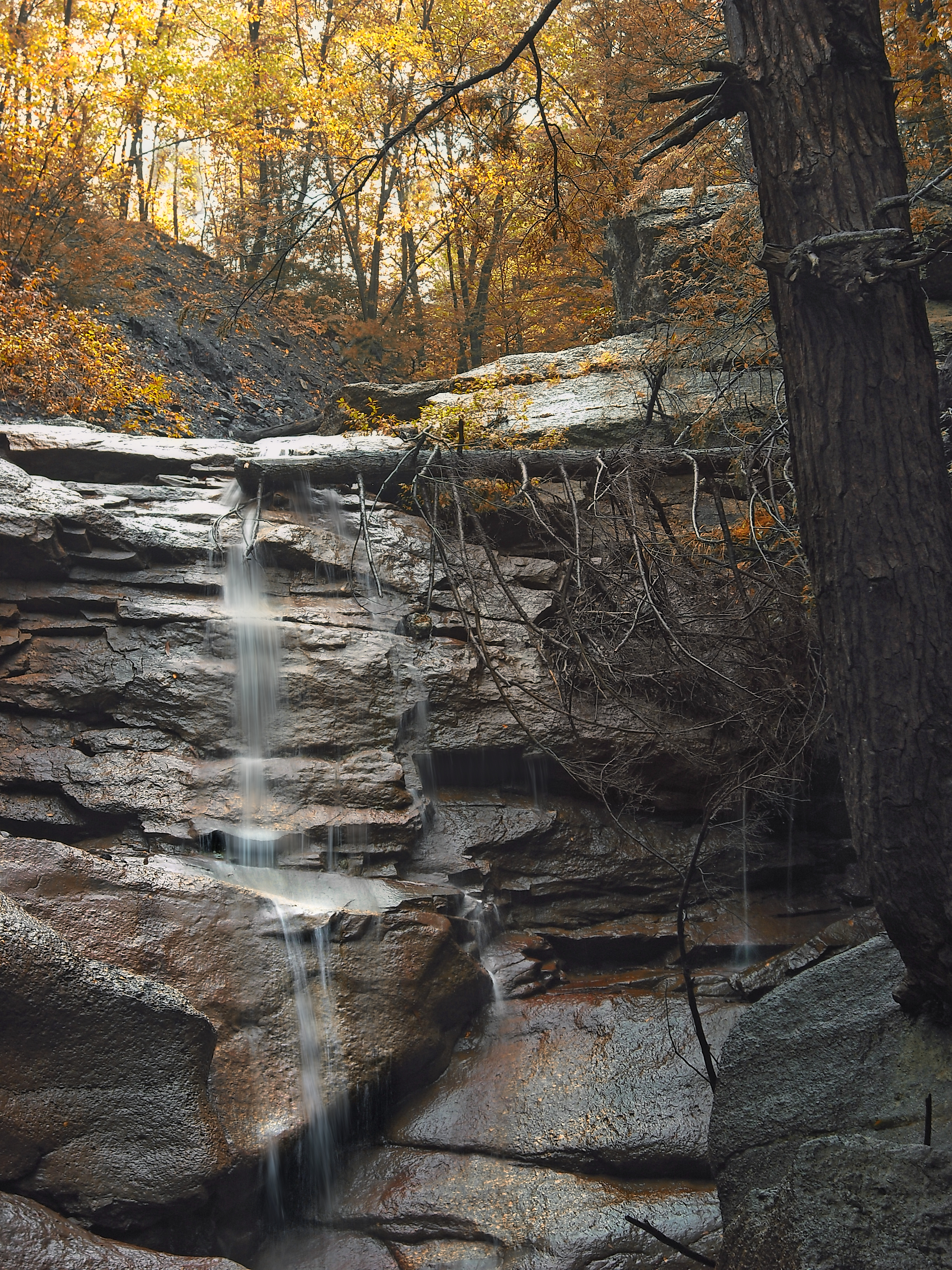
- Swatara Falls, note the exposed coal vein in the background

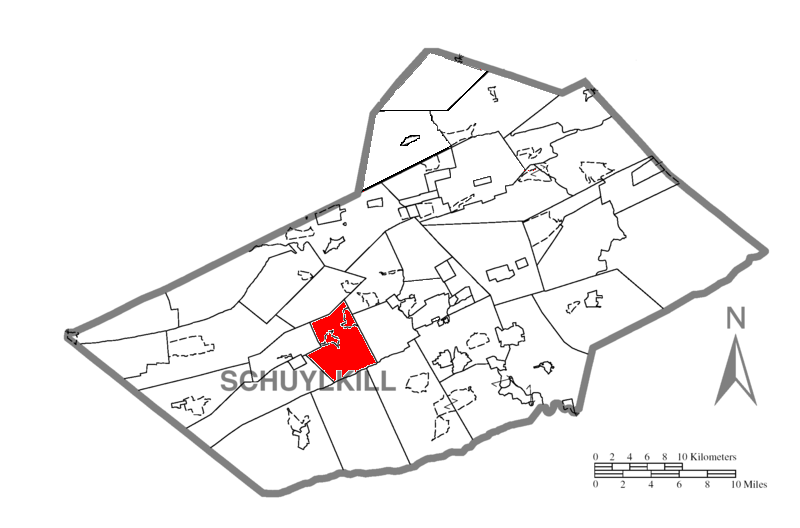
- Map of Schuylkill County, Pennsylvania Highlighting Reilly Township

- Map of Schuylkill County, Pennsylvania
- Country: United States
- State: Pennsylvania
- County: Schuylkill
- Settled: 1790
- Incorporated: 1857

Area
  - Total: 15.65 sq mi (40.54 km^{2})
  - Land: 15.63 sq mi (40.48 km^{2})
  - Water: 0.023 sq mi (0.06 km^{2})

Population (2020)
  - Total: 641 ▼
  - Estimate (2021): 641
  - Density: 44.6/sq mi (17.22/km^{2})
- Time zone: UTC-5 (Eastern (EST))
  - Summer (DST): UTC-4 (EDT)
- FIPS code: 42-107-64088
- Website: https://reillytownshippa.com/

Reilly Township is a township that is located in Schuylkill County, Pennsylvania, United States. The population was 641 at the time of the 2020 census.

== Geography ==
According to the United States Census Bureau, the township has a total area of 16.3 square miles (42.1 km^{2}), of which 16.2 square miles (42.0 km^{2}) is land and 0.04 square mile (0.1 km^{2}) (0.18%) is water. It contains the census-designated places of Branchdale and Newtown.

== Demographics ==
Historical population
Census	Pop.	Note	%±
2010	726		—
2020	641		−11.7%
2021 (est.)	641		0.0%
U.S. Decennial Census

At the time of the 2000 census, there were 802 people, 326 households, and 213 families living in the township.

The population density was 49.4 inhabitants per square mile (19.1/km^{2}). There were 355 housing units at an average density of 21.9/sq mi (8.4/km^{2}).

The racial makeup of the township was 99.63% White, and 0.37% from two or more races. Hispanic or Latino of any race were 0.25%.

Of the 326 households 29.8% had children under the age of eighteen living with them, 53.7% were married couples living together, 9.2% had a female householder with no husband present, and 34.4% were non-families. 29.1% of households were one-person households and 17.5% were one-person households with residents who were aged sixty-five or older.

The average household size was 2.46 and the average family size was 3.07.

The age distribution was 24.8% of residents who were under the age of eighteen, 6.9% who were aged eighteen to twenty-four, 29.6% who were aged twenty-five to forty-four, 19.6% who were aged forty-five to sixty-four, and 19.2% who were aged sixty-five or older. The median age was thirty-eight years.

For every one hundred females, there were 94.2 males. For every one hundred females who were aged eighteen or older, there were 92.7 males.

The median household income was $28,646 and the median family income was $40,500. Males had a median income of $31,667 compared with that of $21,094 for females.

The per capita income for the township was $13,888.

Approximately 5.8% of families and 10.6% of the population were living below the poverty line, including 17.9% of those who were under the age of eighteen and 7.6% of those who were aged sixty-five or older.
