= List of cities and towns along the Schuylkill River =

This is a list of cities, boroughs, and communities along the Schuylkill River in the state of Pennsylvania, United States.

The default sort in the following table is from the source downstream to the Delaware River.

Place name	Place type	County
Tuscarora	Census-designated place	Schuylkill
Middleport	Borough	Schuylkill
New Philadelphia	Borough	Schuylkill
Cumbola	Census-designated place	Schuylkill
Port Carbon	Borough	Schuylkill
Palo Alto	Borough	Schuylkill
Mechanicsville	Borough (The Borough Line extends to the Schuylkill River even though the residential areas do not.)	Schuylkill
Pottsville	City	Schuylkill
Mount Carbon	Borough	Schuylkill
Schuylkill Haven	Borough	Schuylkill
Landingville	Borough	Schuylkill
Auburn	Borough	Schuylkill
Port Clinton	Borough	Schuylkill
Hamburg	Borough	Berks
Shoemakersville	Borough	Berks
Dauberville	Census-designated place	Berks
Leesport	Borough	Berks
Reading	City	Berks
West Reading	Borough	Berks
Birdsboro	Borough	Berks
North Coventry Township	Township	Chester
Pottstown	Borough	Montgomery
Parker Ford	Unincorporated	Chester
Royersford	Borough	Montgomery
Spring City	Borough	Chester
Phoenixville	Borough	Chester
Mont Clare	Village	Montgomery
Port Providence	Unincorporated	Montgomery
Oaks	Village	Montgomery
Valley Forge	Unincorporated	Chester
Norristown	Borough (w/ Home Rule)	Montgomery
Bridgeport	Borough	Montgomery West Conshohocken, Pennsylvania| West Conshohocken]] Borough Montgomery
Conshohocken	Borough	Montgomery
Lower Merion	Township	Montgomery
Philadelphia	City	Philadelphia

- Tamaqua is a borough along the Little Schuylkill River

== See also ==
- List of crossings of the Schuylkill River
- List of Pennsylvania rivers
