= Schuylkill Township, Pennsylvania =

Schuylkill Township could refer to the following places in the U.S. state of Pennsylvania:

- Schuylkill Township, Chester County, Pennsylvania.
- Schuylkill Township, Schuylkill County, Pennsylvania.
