= Flat Rock Dam =

Flat Rock Dam may refer to the following structures:

- Flat Rock Dam (Michigan), a dam in the U.S. state of Michigan
- Flat Rock Dam (Pennsylvania), a dam in the U.S. state of Pennsylvania
