= Palo Alto, Pennsylvania =

Borough in Pennsylvania, US

- Borough
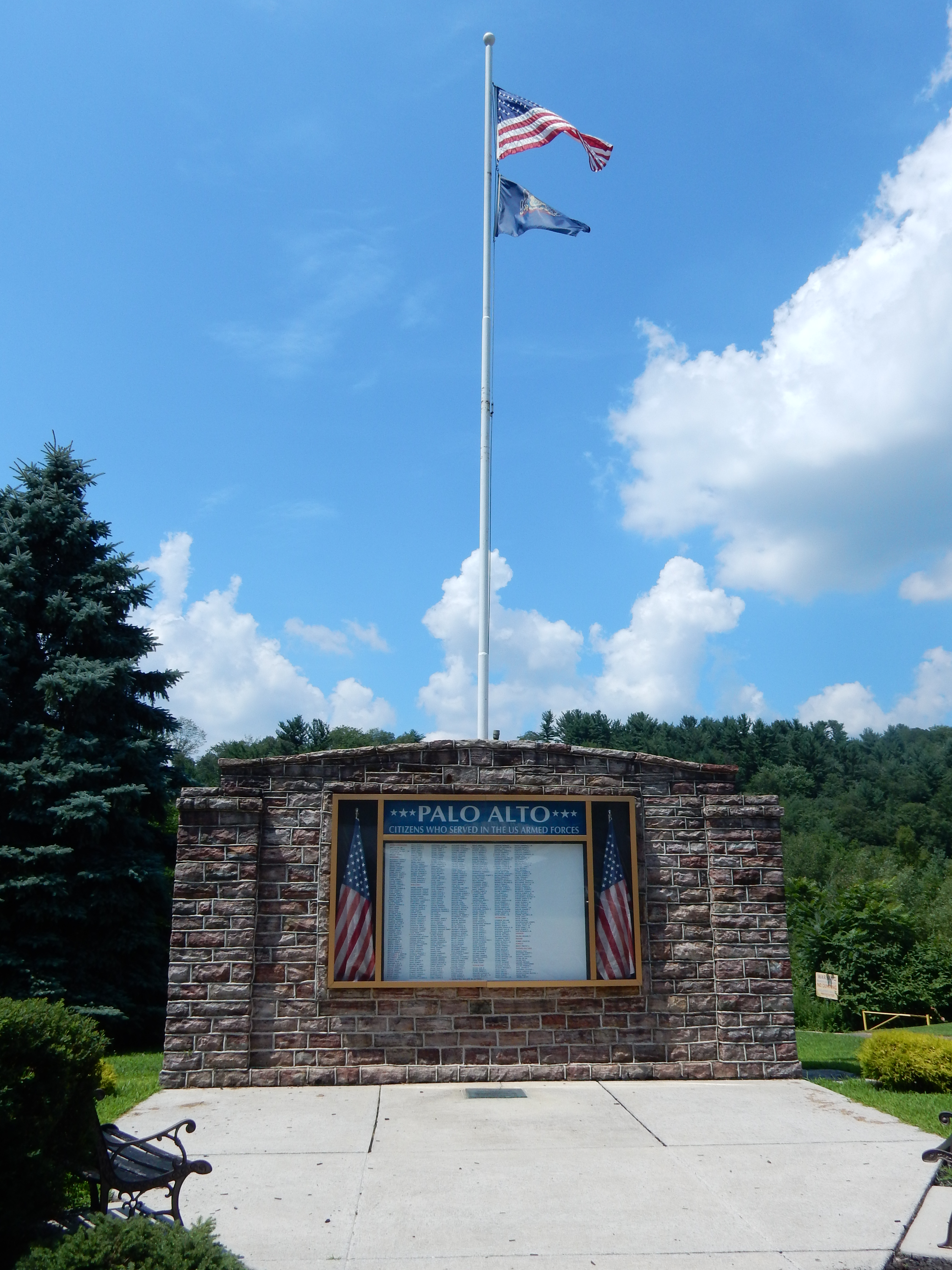
- War Memorial in Palo Alto.

- Location of Palo Alto in Schuylkill County, Pennsylvania.

- Location in Pennsylvania Palo Alto (the United States)
- Coordinates: 40°41′16″N 76°10′16″W
- Country: United States
- State: Pennsylvania
- County: Schuylkill
- Settled: 1844
- Incorporated: 1854

Government
  - Type: Borough Council

Area
  - Total: 1.04 sq mi (2.70 km^{2})
  - Land: 1.04 sq mi (2.70 km^{2})
  - Water: 0 sq mi (0.00 km^{2})

Population (2020)
  - Total: 970
  - Density: 928.8/sq mi (358.63/km^{2})
- Time zone: UTC-5 (Eastern (EST))
  - Summer (DST): UTC-4 (EDT)
- Zip code: 17901
- Area code: 570
- FIPS code: 42-57752
- Website: http://www.paloaltopa.com/

Palo Alto is a borough in Schuylkill County, Pennsylvania, United States. Bacon Street is the main street of town.

This borough stretches along the south bank of the Schuylkill River, and maintains its own fire department, but shares its zip code, telephone exchanges and school district with the city of Pottsville.

As of the 2020 census, Palo Alto had a population of 970.

== History ==
Heavily forested until the mid-1870s, the land which became the community of Palo Alto was the site of a log cabin and wooden blacksmith's shanty earlier in the nineteenth century. As more and more settlers arrived in the region, the Philadelphia and Reading Railroad and the Schuylkill Navigation Company (later known as the Schuylkill Canal) opened stops here. In response, the neighboring land was surveyed and plotted out by John G. Hewes between late 1844 and early 1845 to create the town of Palo Alto.

As more boatmen and other laborers arrived to work on the canal and railroad, mining companies continued to increase their hiring of miners to work deep underground in their anthracite coal collieries that were operating across Schuylkill County, which sparked the opening of stores and other businesses to serve the town's growing population.

A public school was established sometime during this phase of the community's expansion; it was situated in the town's eastern section.

Officially incorporated as a borough in 1854, Palo Alto may have been given its name because of "very high timber [that] grew on the mountain above it," according to historians. According to a borough history, Palo Alto was named for the Battle of Palo Alto, the first major battle of the Mexican-American War near present-day Brownsville, Texas.

The borough's first elected officials were Burgess Waters S. Chillson, William M. Stellwagon, clerk, and borough council members William Bensinger, Allen Enison, John Griner, Jacob Lime, David Riley, and William Stellwagon. A second public school was then opened in the borough's western section. Both schools were two-room structures with stone exteriors.

Between 1854 and 1855, William Harris erected and began operating a large rolling mill plant, which produced railroad iron. That plant was subsequently purchased by Benjamin Haywood, who built a second rolling mill in the town in 1863. The two-plant operation was known as the Palo Alto Rolling Mill. The Philadelphia and Reading Railroad, which was one of the company's major customers, operated a roundhouse and repair facility roughly a mile west of both rolling mills.

By 1856, a stable water system was in place with water supplied by the Pottsville Water Company.

In 1866, community leaders designed and built a Methodist Episcopal church on Union Street at a cost of thirteen hundred dollars.

The borough's first post office opened in 1870, but it ceased operations in 1873. Mail service was subsequently provided by a post office branch in Pottsville.

In 1878, borough leaders built a new, two-story public school in the center of the community. Equipped with mountain spring-supplied water and steam heat, it delivered multiple grades of education in four classrooms while the two older schools focused on providing primary school instruction. Roughly three hundred students were educated annually at this time

== Geography ==
Palo Alto is located at 40°41′16″N 76°10′16″W.

According to the United States Census Bureau, the borough has a total area of 1.1 square miles (2.8 km^{2}), all of it land.

== Demographics ==
Historical population
Census	Pop.	Note	%±
1860	1,108		—
1870	1,740		57.0%
1880	1,588		−8.7%
1890	1,424		−10.3%
1900	1,707		19.9%
1910	1,873		9.7%
1920	1,667		−11.0%
1930	1,908		14.5%
1940	1,934		1.4%
1950	1,767		−8.6%
1960	1,445		−18.2%
1970	1,428		−1.2%
1980	1,321		−7.5%
1990	1,192		−9.8%
2000	1,052		−11.7%
2010	1,032		−1.9%
2020	970		−6.0%
2021 (est.)	971	▲	0.1%

As of the census of 2000, there were 1,052 people, 444 households, and 306 families living in the borough.

The population density was 995.9 inhabitants per square mile (384.5/km^{2}). There were 478 housing units at an average density of 452.5 per square mile (174.7/km^{2}).

The racial makeup of the borough was 98.86% White, 0.10% African American, 0.29% Asian, and 0.76% from two or more races.

There were 444 households, out of which 25.7% had children under the age of 18 living with them, 55.2% were married couples living together, 10.4% had a female householder with no husband present, and 30.9% were non-families. 26.4% of all households were made up of individuals, and 14.0% had someone living alone who was 65 years of age or older.

The average household size was 2.37 and the average family size was 2.88.

In the borough the population was spread out, with 18.7% under the age of 18, 8.0% from 18 to 24, 27.1% from 25 to 44, 25.4% from 45 to 64, and 20.8% who were 65 years of age or older. The median age was 42 years. For every 100 females there were 91.3 males.

For every 100 females age 18 and over, there were 89.2 males.

The median income for a household in the borough was $35,729, and the median income for a family was $41,667. Males had a median income of $30,449 compared with that of $21,042 for females.

The per capita income for the borough was $16,806. Roughly 3.5% of families and 6.9% of the population were below the poverty line, including 4.3% of those under age 18 and 13.2% of those age 65 or over.

== Notable person ==
Eddie Delker, baseball infielder

== Gallery ==
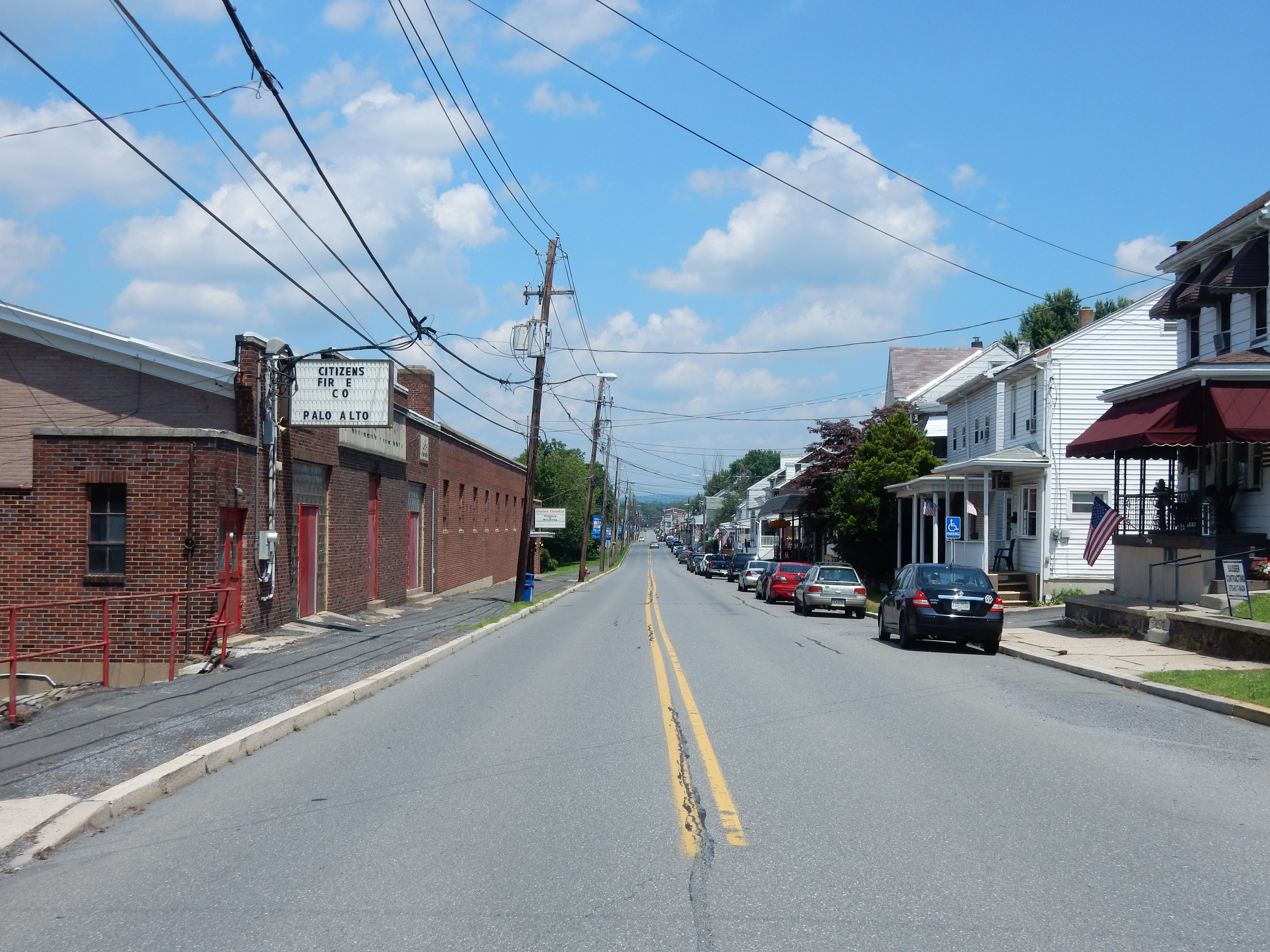
Bacon Street.

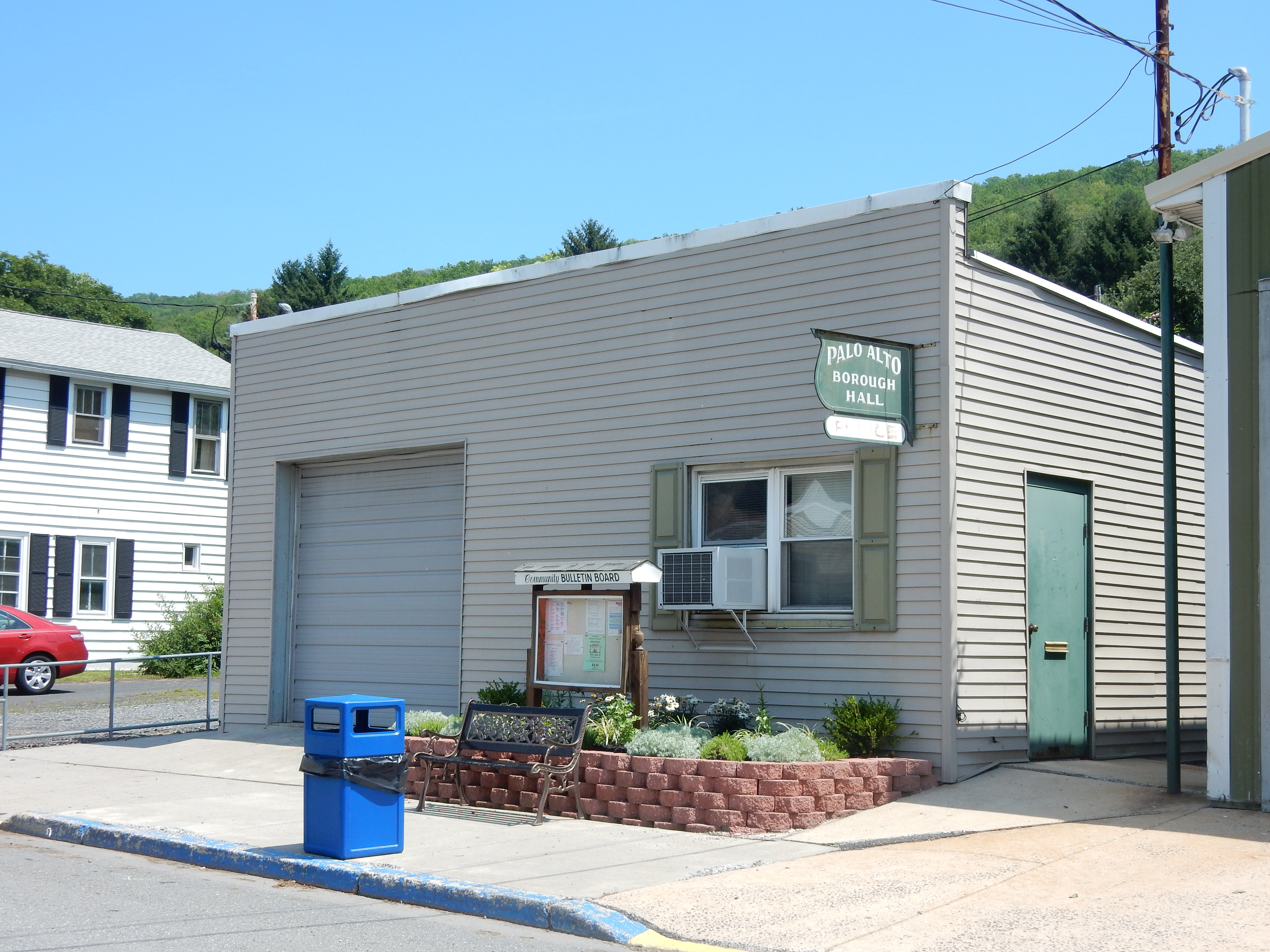
Palo Alto Borough Hall.

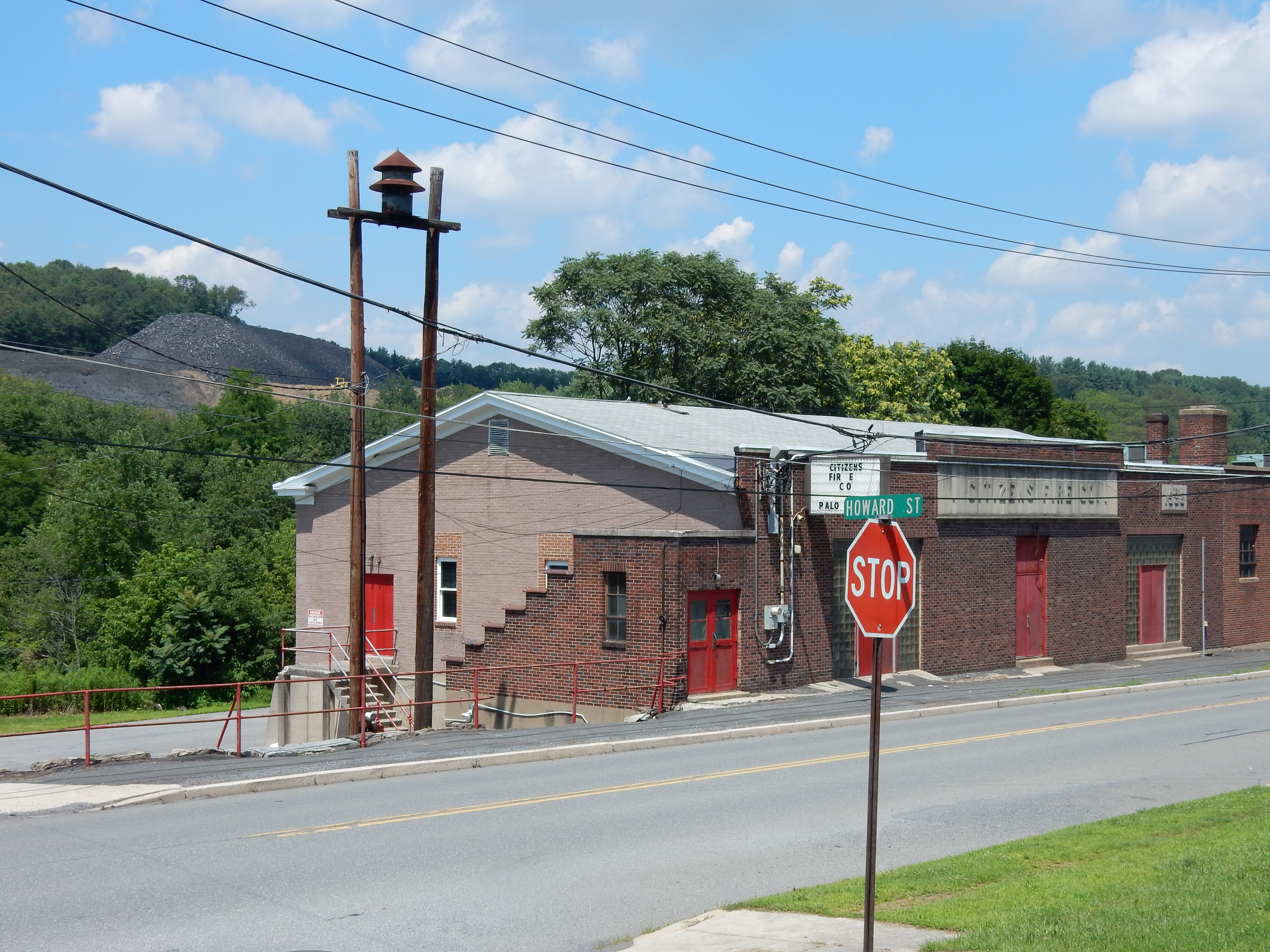
Citizens Fire Co.

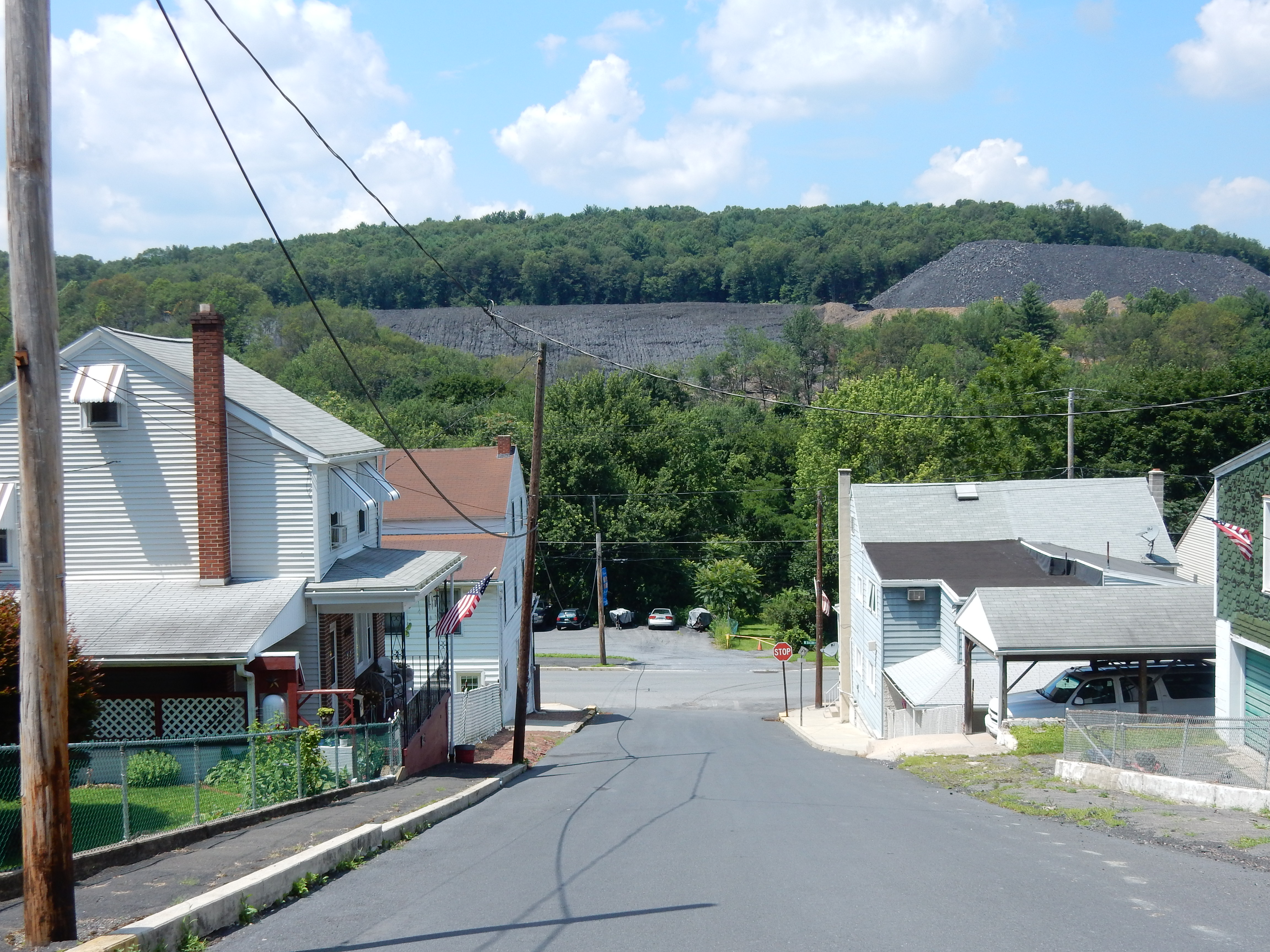
View from Charles Street.

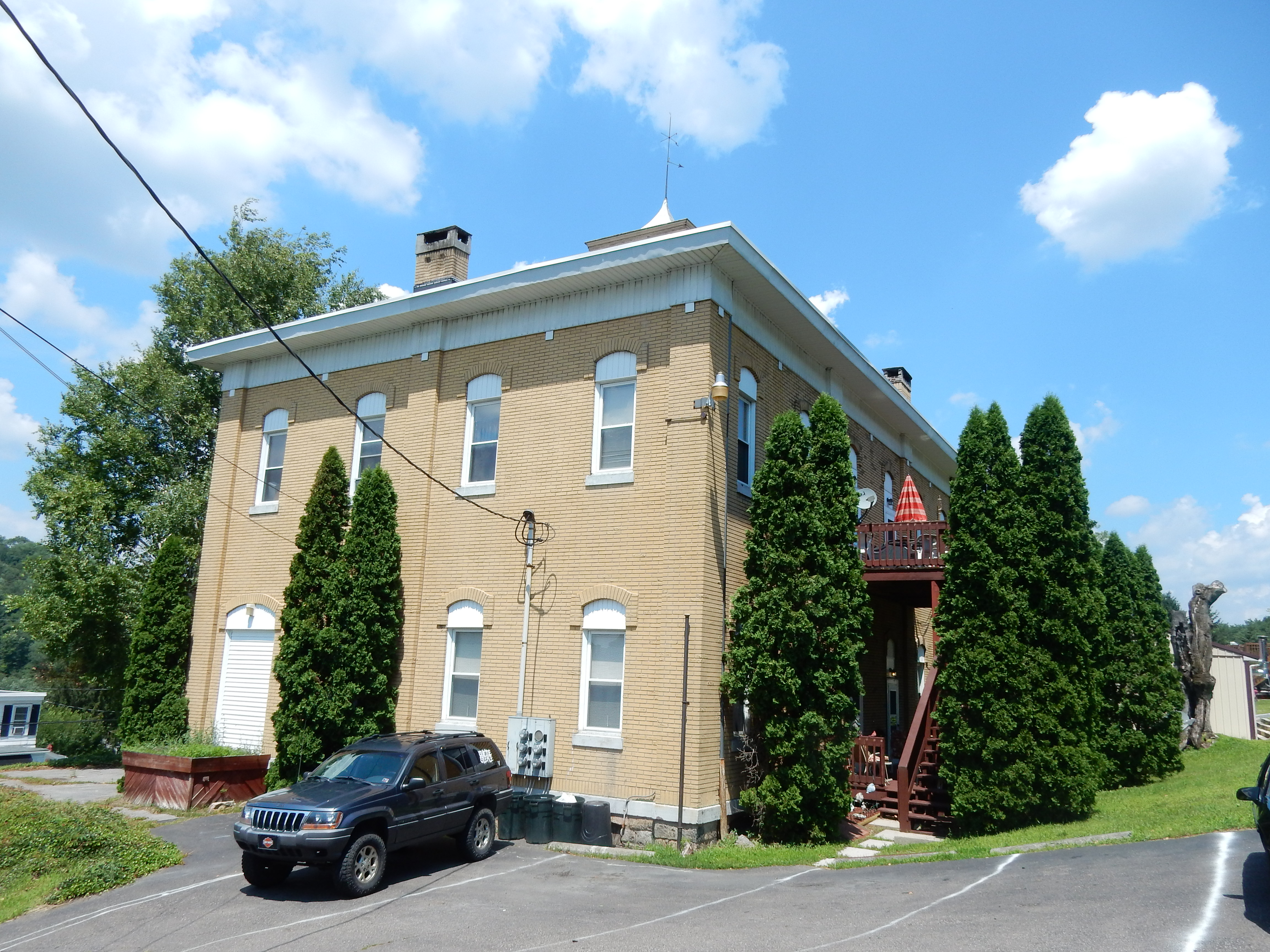
House on Fox Street.
