= Tuscarora, Pennsylvania =

Unincorporated community in Pennsylvania, US

Tuscarora
- Census-designated place
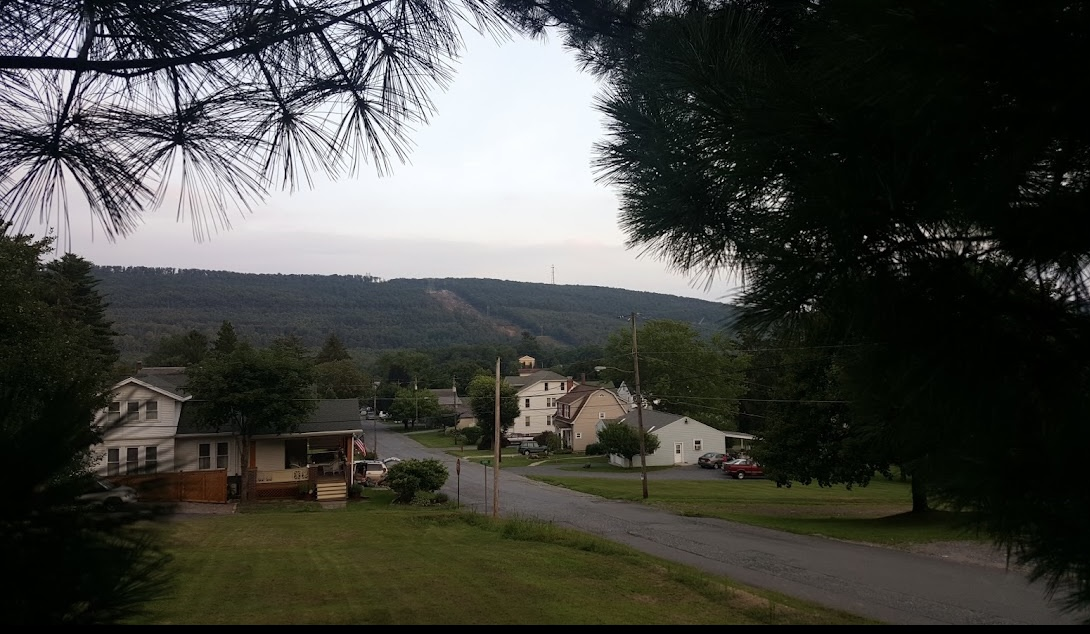
- View of Tuscarora from Forest and North; Tuscarora View From North

- Location within the U.S. state of Pennsylvania
- Coordinates: 40°45′43″N 76°2′56″W
- Country: United States
- State: Pennsylvania
- County: Schuylkill
- Township: Schuylkill

Area
  - Total: 3.6 sq mi (9.3 km^{2})
  - Land: 3.6 sq mi (9.3 km^{2})

Population (2000)
  - Total: 980
  - Density: 270/sq mi (110/km^{2})
- Time zone: UTC-5 (Eastern (EST))
  - Summer (DST): UTC-4 (EDT)
- ZIP code: 17982
- Area code: 570

Tuscarora is a census-designated place (CDP) that is located in Schuylkill County, Pennsylvania, United States. The population was 980 at the time of the 2010 census.

== Geography ==
Tuscarora is located at 40°45′43″N 76°2′56″W (40.761918, -76.048965).

One branch of the headwaters to the Schuylkill River is in Tuscarora. The East Branch of the Schuylkill River runs southwestward from the Tuscarora area until it converges with the West Branch near Pottsville and continues to flow south, where it eventually joins the Delaware River as one of its largest tributaries.

According to the United States Census Bureau, the CDP has a total area of 3.6 square miles (9.3 km^{2}), all land.

== Demographics ==
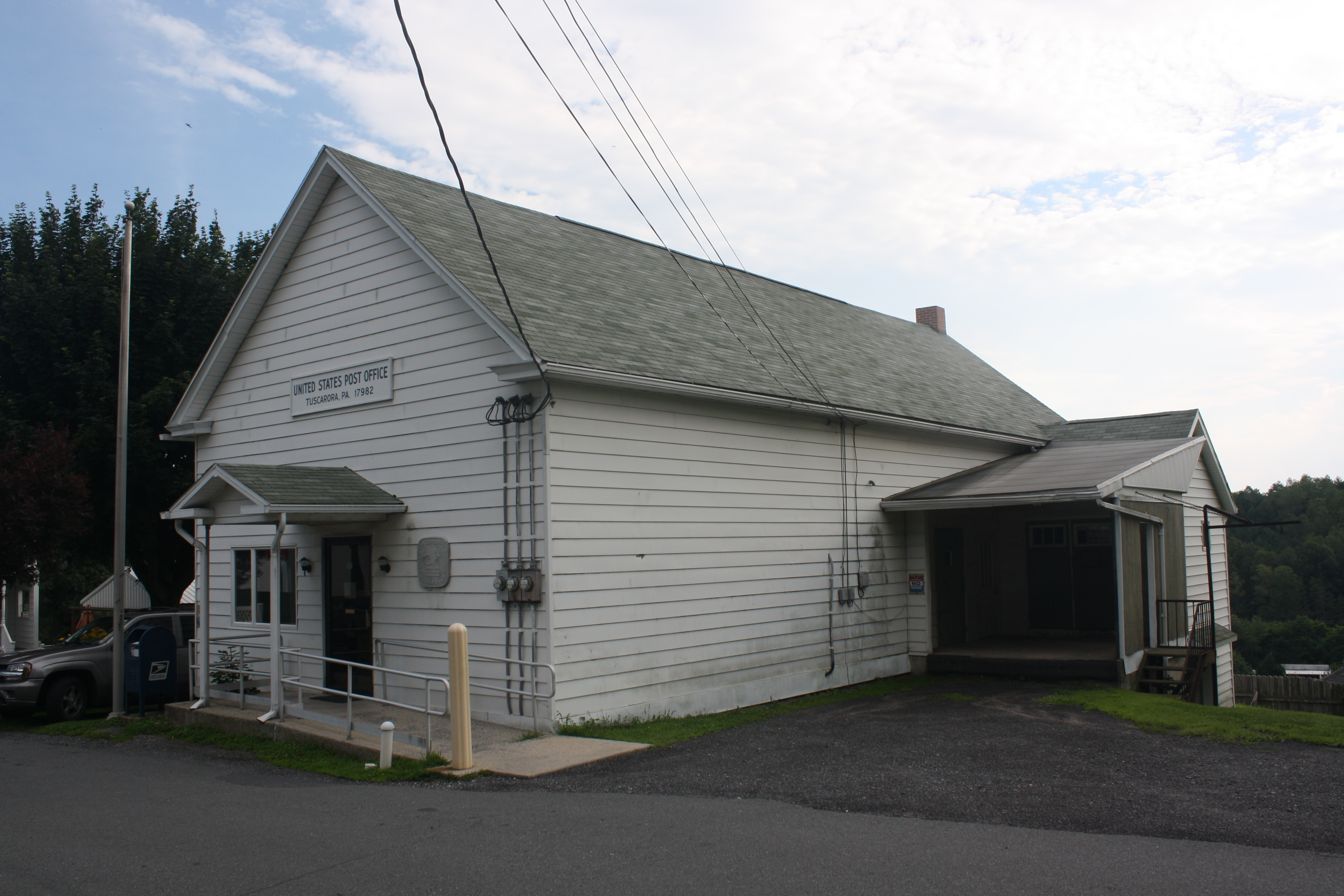
U.S. Post Office in Tuscarora.

As of the census of 2000, there were 939 people, 428 households, and 290 families residing in the CDP.

The population density was 261.6 inhabitants per square mile (101.0/km^{2}). There were 488 housing units at an average density of 136.0 per square mile (52.5/km^{2}).

The racial makeup of the CDP was 99.47% White, 0.11% African American, 0.21% Native American, and 0.21% from two or more races.

There were 428 households, out of which 17.5% had children who were under the age of eighteen living with them; 51.9% were married couples living together, 9.8% had a female householder with no husband present, and 32.2% were non-families. 29.2% of all households were made up of individuals, and 19.4% had someone living alone who was sixty-five years of age or older.

The average household size was 2.19 and the average family size was 2.66.

Within the CDP, the population was spread out, with 15.1% of residents who were under the age of eighteen, 5.1% who were aged eighteen to twenty-four, 24.5% who were aged twenty-five to forty-four, 29.7% who were aged forty-five to sixty-four, and 25.6% who were sixty-five years of age or older. The median age was forty-nine years.

For every one hundred females, there were 90.9 males. For every one hundred females who were aged eighteen or older, there were 88.9 males.

The median income for a household in the CDP was $31,023, and the median income for a family was $36,923. Males had a median income of $36,477 compared with that of $21,442 for females.

The per capita income for the CDP was $16,455.

Approximately 8.3% of families and 7.9% of the population were living below the poverty line, including 9.4% of those who were under the age of eighteen and 8.1% of those who were aged sixty-five or older.

== History ==
Tuscarora derives its name from the movement of the Tuscarora people from their homelands in the Carolinas to New York during the aftermath of the Tuscarora War in the early 18th century. A part of the transitory Tuscarora settled at a point approximately two miles west of Tamaqua, Pennsylvania, where they planted apple trees and lived for a number of years. It is probable that it was these Tuscarora who were later moved to Oquaga.

Tuscarora lies within Schuylkill Township, which was one of the original townships of the county, organized in 1811. On May 20, 1830, a US post-office was established in Tuscarora. By 1846 Tuscarora was the terminus of the Schuylkill Valley Railroad. Tuscarora now had seventeen houses, two taverns, one store, and a population of 139. By 1852 the place flourished because of the coal collieries (including those in nearby Mary D such as Silver Creek), local operators, were working the mines on the so-called "Kentucky banks". These mines were worked up to 1875, when they passed to the proprietorship of the Philadelphia and Reading Coal and Iron Company and were eventually abandoned in the late 19th century. There were, subsequently, small operations, such as Slattery's Tuscarora Colliery, in the area into the early 20th century.

Several residents of Tuscarora were involved in the Molly Maguires, trials of the late 1870s, including Martin Bergen, hanged at Pottsville on January 16, 1879, for the murder of Patrick Burns in Silver Creek; John Campbell, convicted of the second-degree murder of F.W. Langdon and sentenced to five years in prison; John "Yellow Jack" Donahue, convicted in several conspiracy cases, hanged at Mauch Chunk for his role in the murder of Morgan Powell on June 21, 1877; Neil Dougherty, convicted of the second-degree murder of F.W. Langdon and sentenced to nine years in prison; James "Powder Keg" Kerrigan, self-confessed participant in the assassinations of Benjamin Yost and John P. Jones, who appeared as a witness for the prosecution in the trials of James Carroll et al., Alexander Campbell, John Kehoe et al., John "Yellow Jack" Donahue, James McDonnell, and Charles Sharp, but was never tried for his own part in the killings of Yost and Jones; James "Hairy Man" McDonnell, hanged at Mauch Chunk on January 14, 1879, for the murder of George K. Smith in 1863, testified for the prosecution in the 1878 trial of Martin Bergen for the murder of Patrick Burns, and missed a temporary reprieve of his sentence when it arrived too late on the day of his hanging; and John J. Slattery, informant, convicted in the conspiracy cases but turned informant during the trial, so his sentence was postponed, testified for the prosecution in the trial of "Yellow Jack" Donahue for the killing of Morgan Powell, implicated John Kehoe in extensive political corruption, and also testified against Martin Bergen in 1878, when Bergen stood trial for the murder of Patrick Burns.

In the 1971 film Klute, Tuscarora is the hometown of the title character, John Klute.
