= Mary D, Pennsylvania =

Unincorporated community in Pennsylvania, US

Mary D
- Unincorporated community
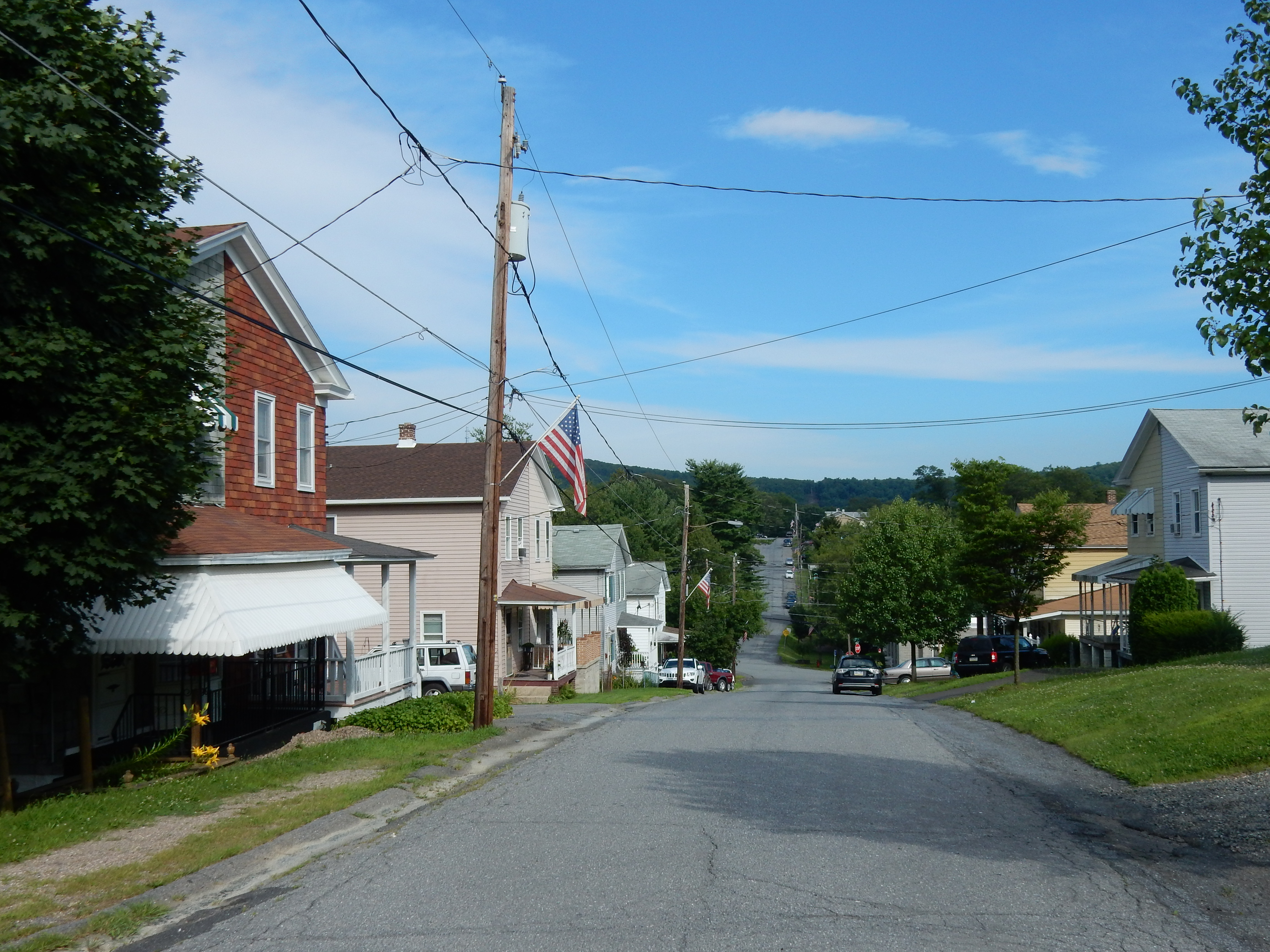
- Main Street in Mary D.

- Location within the state of Pennsylvania Mary D (the United States)
- Coordinates: 40°45′36″N 76°3′22″W
- Country: United States
- State: Pennsylvania
- County: Schuylkill
- Elevation: 906 ft (276 m)
- Time zone: UTC-5 (Eastern (EST))
  - Summer (DST): UTC-4 (EDT)
- ZIP codes: 17952
- Area code: 570
- GNIS feature ID: 1180517

Mary D is an unincorporated community and coal town in Schuylkill County, Pennsylvania, United States. It is located in Schuylkill Township on U.S. Route 209 and the Schuylkill River forms its natural southeastern boundary.

== Etymology ==
The community derives its name from Mary Delores Dodson, the wife of a local mine owner.

== Demographics ==
Historical population
| Census | Pop. | Note | %± |
|---|---|---|---|
| 2023 (est.) | 98 |

The United States Census Bureau defined MaryD as a census designated place (CDP) in 2023.
