= Schuylkill Township, Schuylkill County, Pennsylvania =

Township in Pennsylvania, US

Coordinates: 40°47′30″N 75°59′58″W

- Township
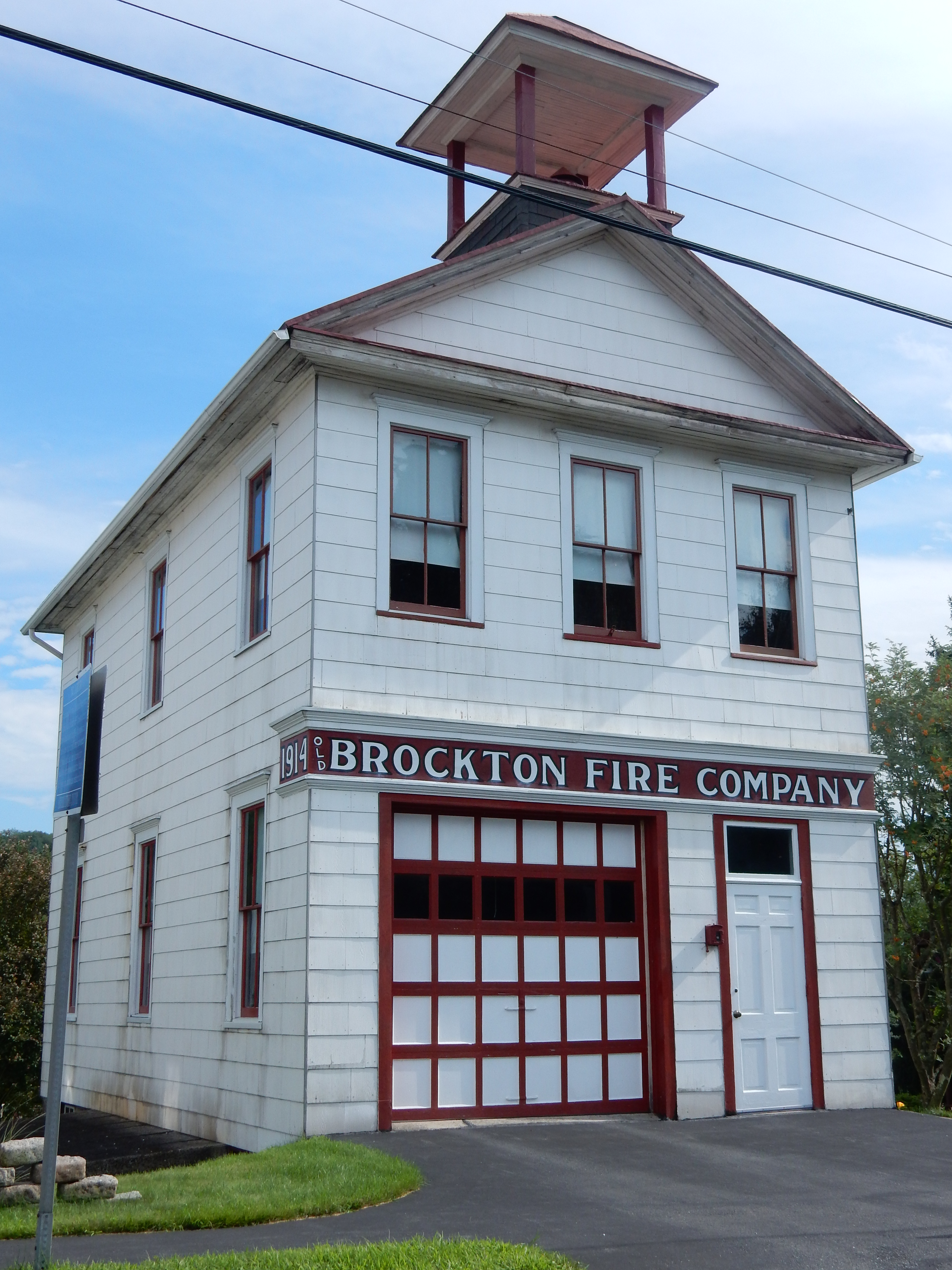
- Former Brockton Firehouse in Brockton

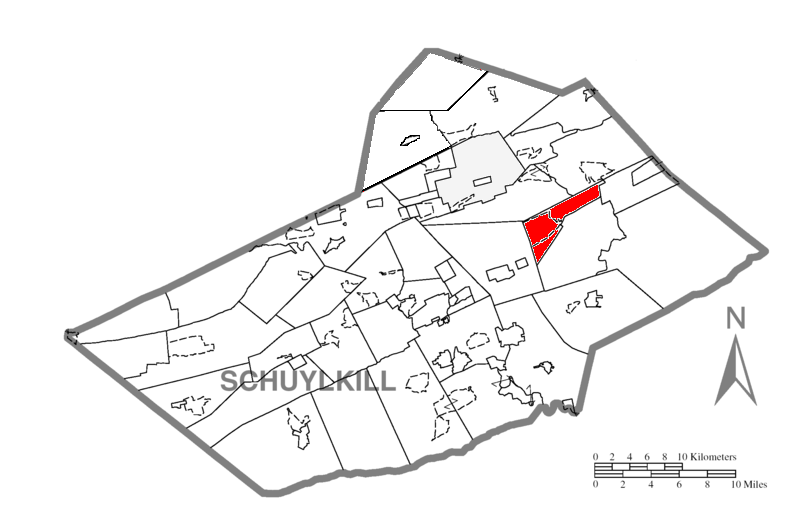
- Map of Schuylkill County, Pennsylvania Highlighting Schuylkill Township

- Map of Schuylkill County, Pennsylvania
- Country: United States
- State: Pennsylvania
- County: Schuylkill
- Settled: 1802
- Incorporated: 1811

Area
  - Total: 9.66 sq mi (25.01 km^{2})
  - Land: 9.66 sq mi (25.01 km^{2})
  - Water: 0 sq mi (0.00 km^{2})

Population (2020)
  - Total: 1,076 ▼
  - Estimate (2021): 1,077
  - Density: 112.3/sq mi (43.35/km^{2})
- Time zone: UTC-5 (Eastern (EST))
  - Summer (DST): UTC-4 (EDT)
- Postal code: 17925
- Area code: 570
- FIPS code: 42-107-68304

Schuylkill Township is a township that is located in Schuylkill County, Pennsylvania. The population was 1,076 at the time of the 2020 census.

== History ==
The Tamaqua Historic District was listed on the National Register of Historic Places in 1991.

== Geography ==
According to the U.S. Census Bureau, the township has a total area of 9.8 square miles (25.5 km^{2}), all land. It includes the census-designated place of Tuscarora.

== Demographics ==
Historical population
Census	Pop.	Note	%±
2010	1,129		—
2020	1,076		−4.7%
2021 (est.)	1,077		0.1%
U.S. Decennial Census

At the time of the 2000 census, there were 1,123 people, 503 households, and 345 families living in the township.

The population density was 114.2 inhabitants per square mile (44.1/km^{2}). There were 568 housing units at an average density of 57.8 per square mile (22.3/km^{2}).

The racial makeup of the township was 99.38% White, 0.09% African American, 0.27% Native American, 0.09% Asian, and 0.18% from two or more races. Hispanic or Latino of any race were 0.09%.

Of the 503 households documented by the census, 18.9% had children who were under the age of eighteen living with them, 53.5% were married couples living together, 9.1% had a female householder with no husband present, and 31.4% were non-families. 28.4% of households were one-person households and 18.3% were one-person households with residents who were aged sixty-five or older.

The average household size was 2.23 and the average family size was 2.70.

The age distribution was 15.8% who were under the age of eighteen, 5.4% who were aged eighteen to twenty-four, 25.6% who were aged twenty-five to sixty-four, 29.5% who were aged forty-five to sixty-four, and 23.7% who were aged sixty-five or older. The median age was forty-seven years.

For every one hundred females, there were 93.6 males. For every one hundred females who were aged eighteen or older, there were 91.1 males.

The median household income was $32,098 and the median family income was $38,182. Males had a median income of $35,417 compared with that of $21,250 for females.

The per capita income for the township was $16,452.

Approximately 6.9% of families and 6.6% of the population were living below the poverty line, including 6.9% of those who were under the age of eighteen and 7.9% of those who were aged sixty-five or older.

== Gallery ==
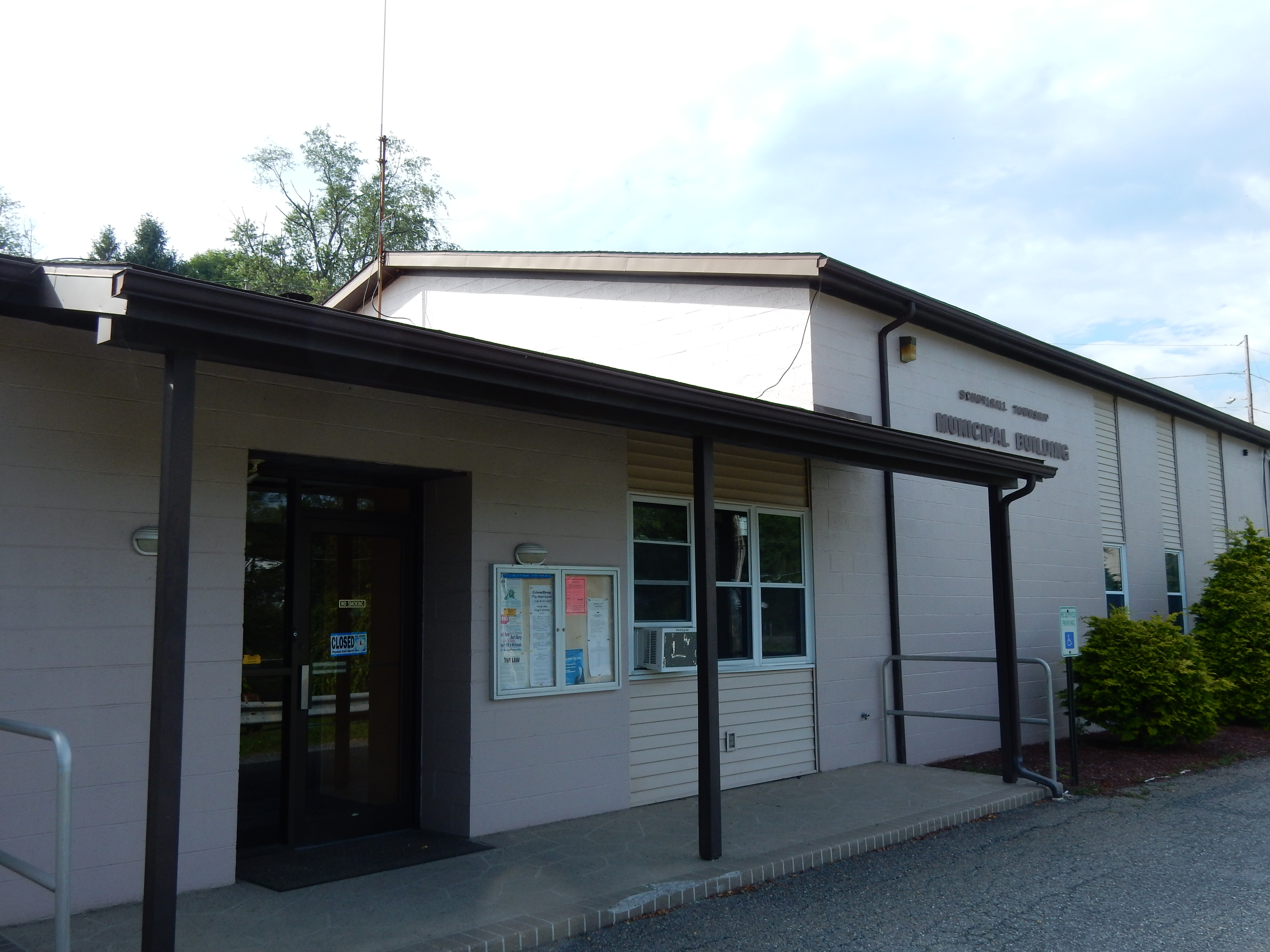
Township Municipal Building

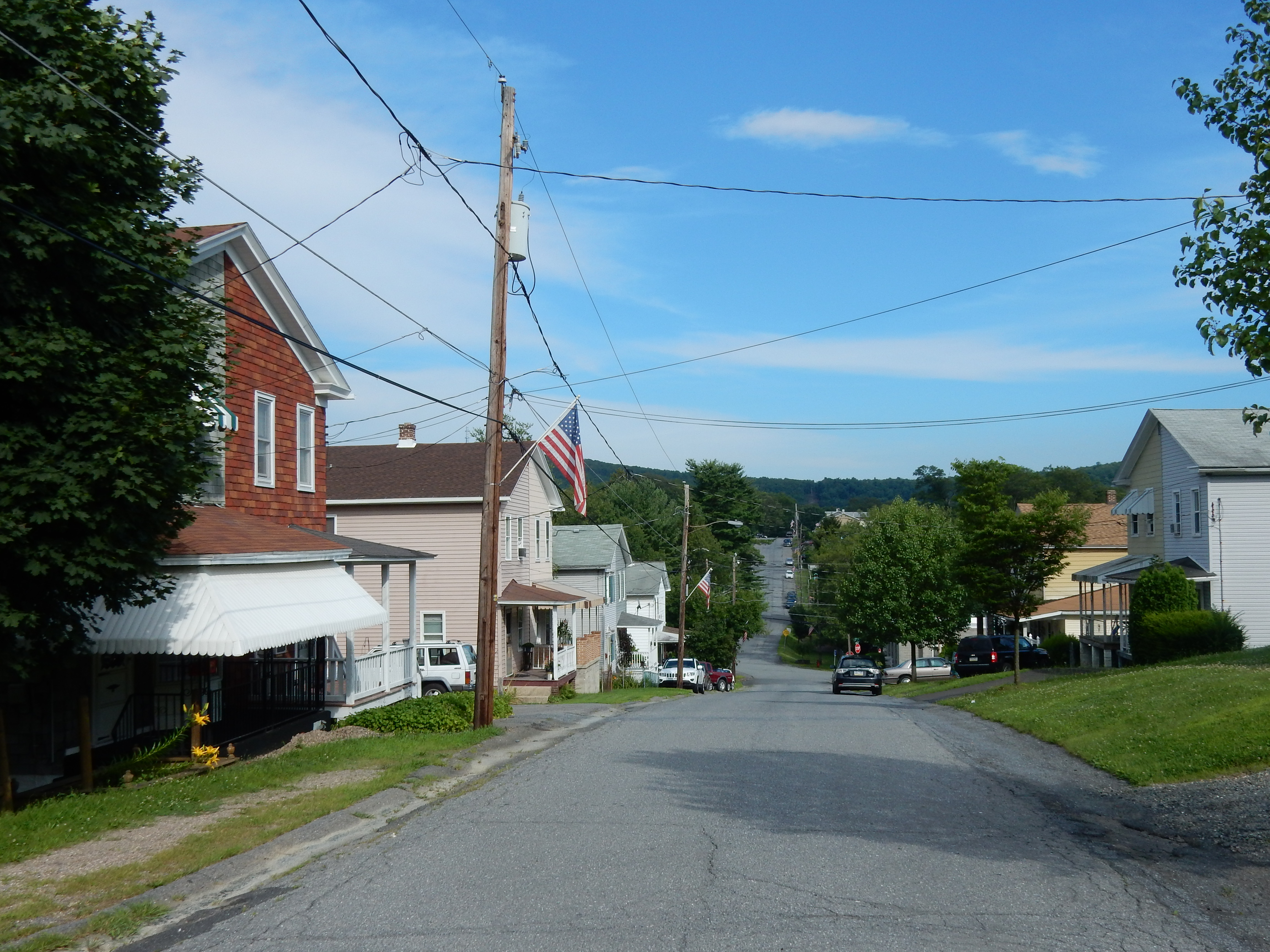
Main Street in Mary D

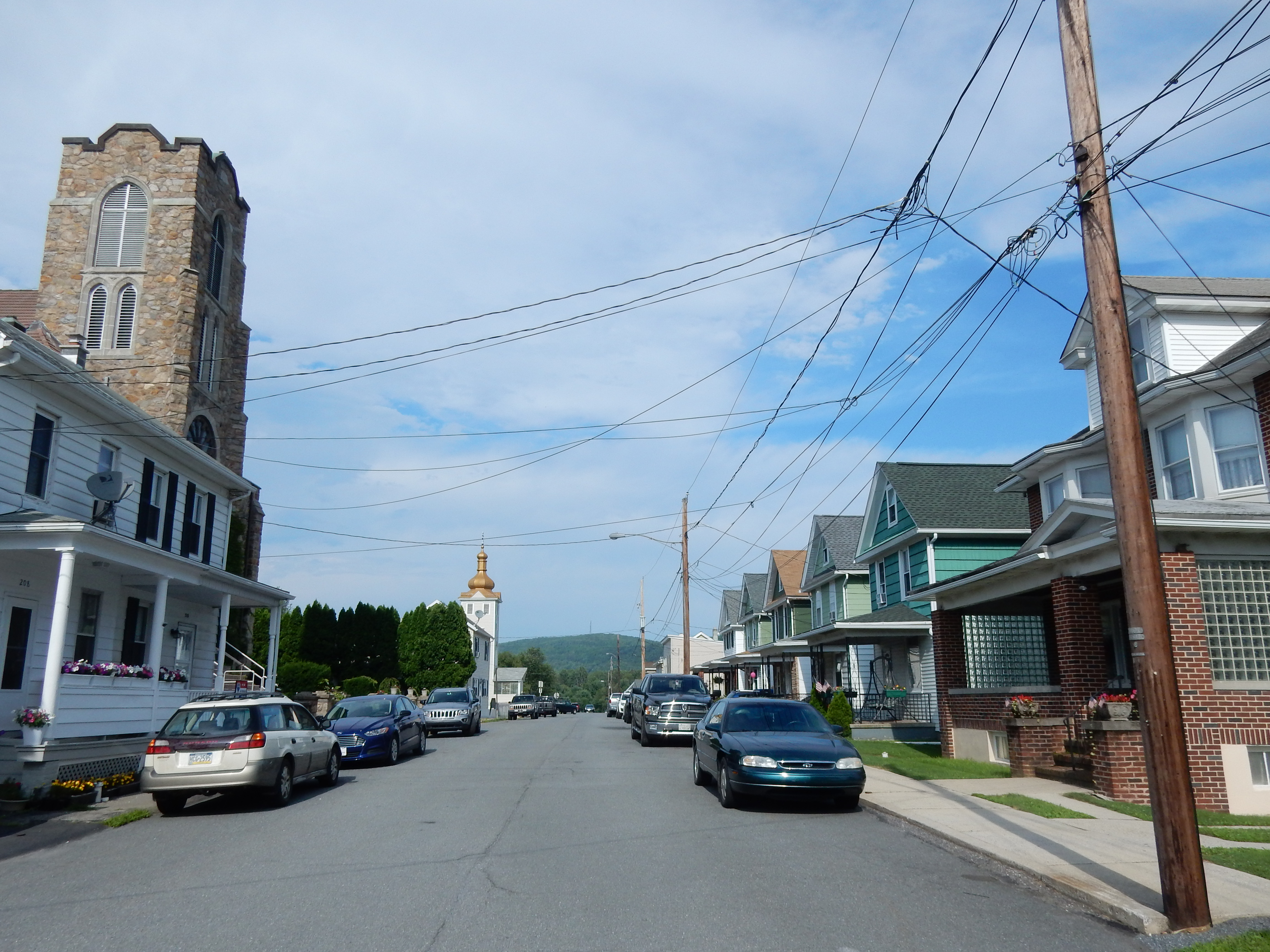
Brockton, Green Street

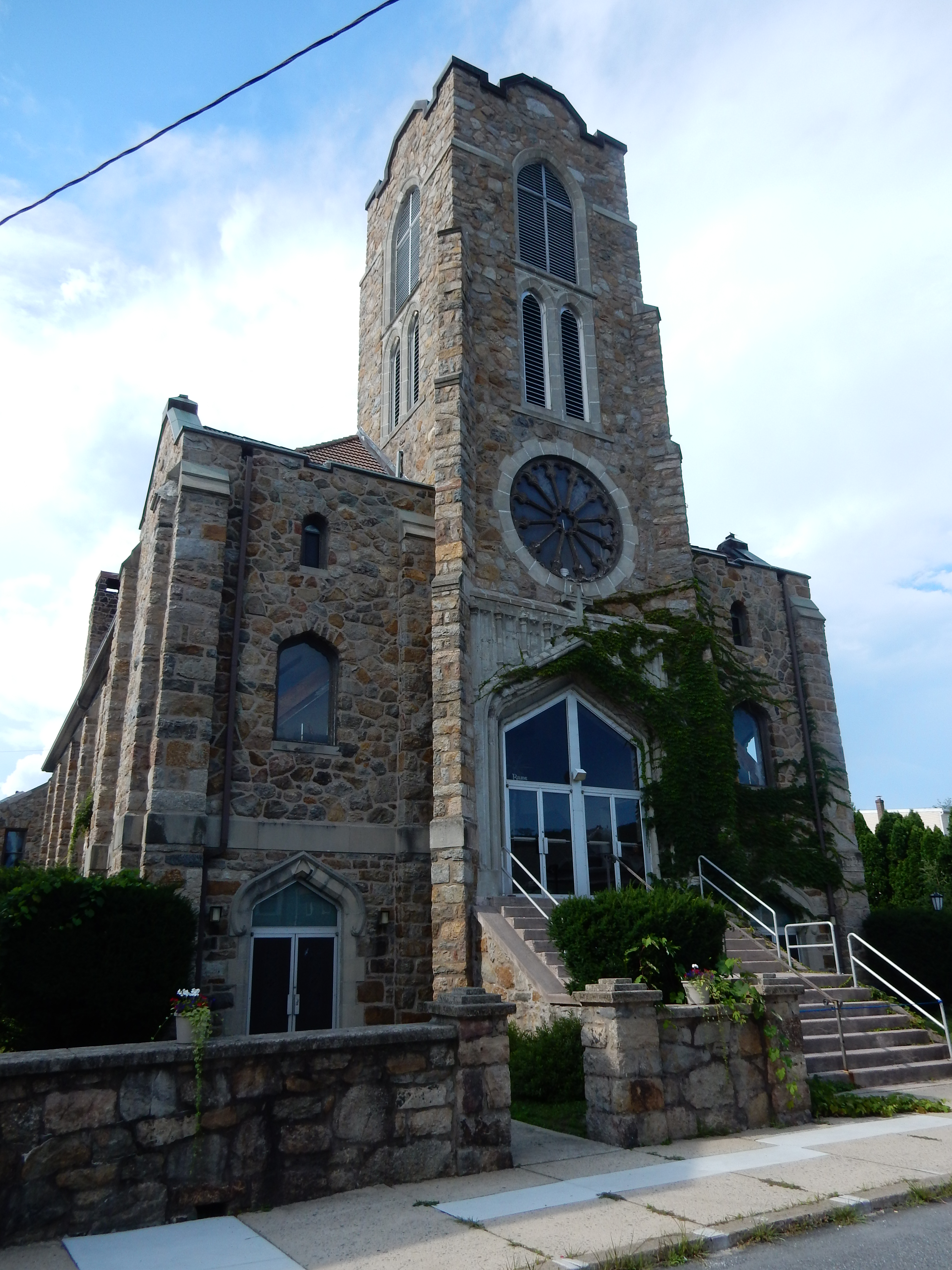
St. Joseph's Church in Brockton

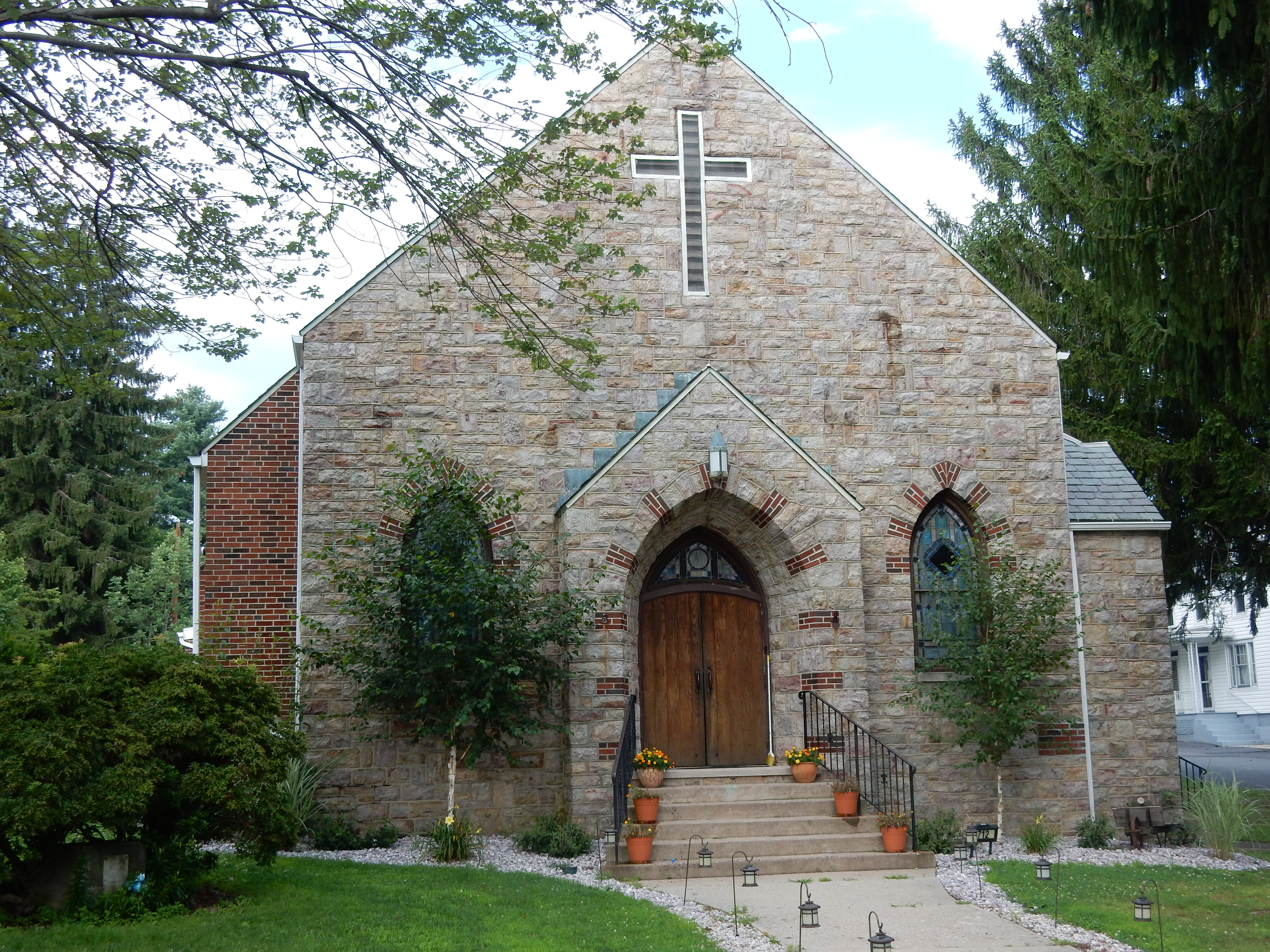
St. Bertha Church in Tuscarora
