= Flat Rock Dam (Pennsylvania) =

Schuylkill River earthen dam

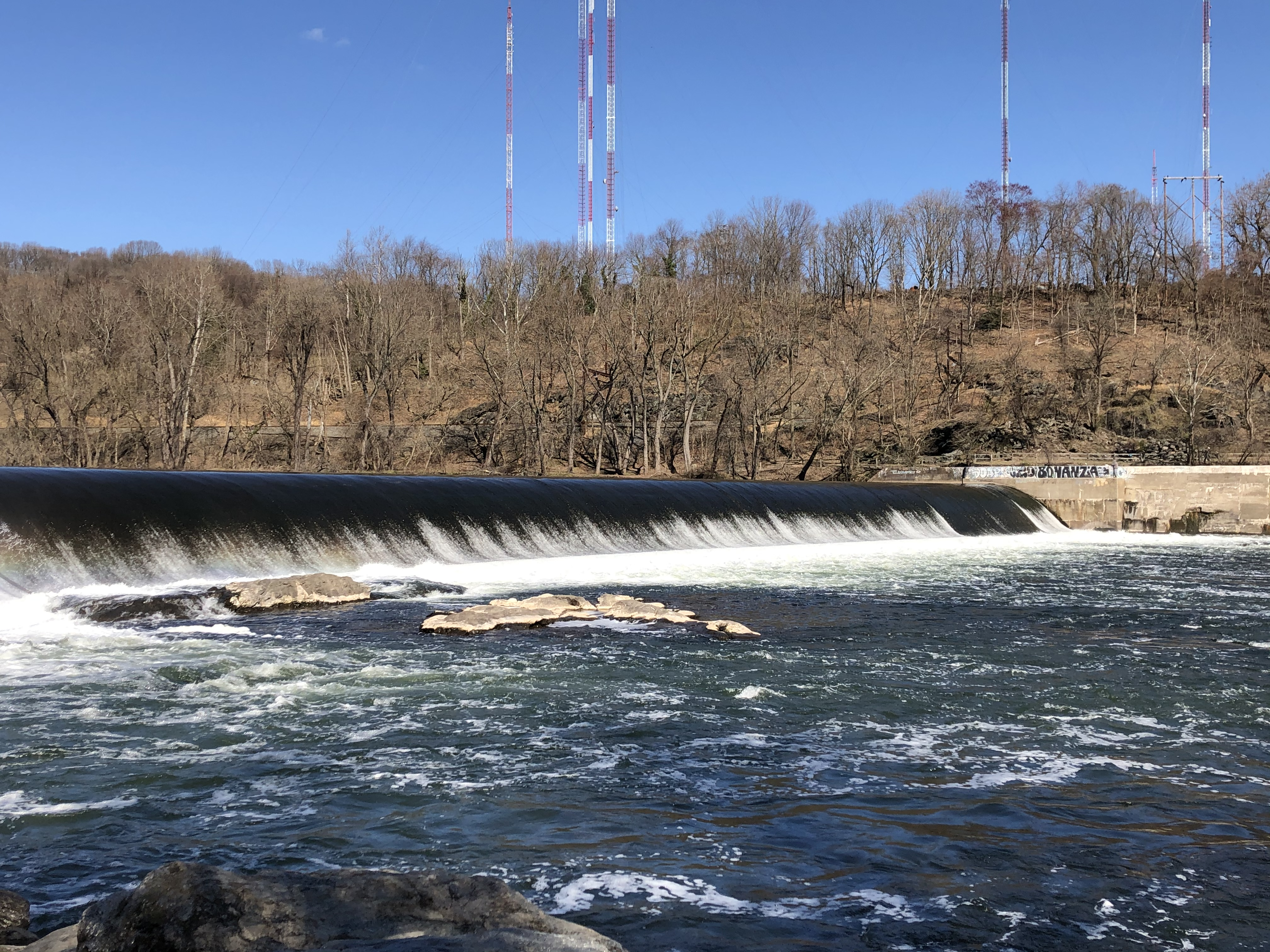
- Interactive map of Flat Rock Dam
- Official name: Flat Rock Dam
- Country: United States
- Location: Philadelphia and Montgomery County, Pennsylvania
- Coordinates: 40°02′23″N 75°14′49″W
- Construction began: 1815
- Opening date: 1818

Dam and spillways
- Impounds: Schuylkill River

Reservoir
- Creates: Flat Rock Pool

The Flat Rock Dam is an earthen dam which stretches across the Schuylkill River. It is part of the Flat Rock Park maintained by Lower Merion Township, Montgomery County, Pennsylvania, and is located off the Schuylkill Expressway in Gladwyne.

== History and architectural details ==
The dam is part of a series of locks and waterways built by the Schuylkill Navigation Company between Port Carbon and Philadelphia in order to carry upstate coal to markets in the city. It created a pool for the canal boats above it and brought water to the Manayunk Reach. Under the supervision of Ariel Cooley, a Massachusetts engineer who was responsible for the design of the Fairmount Dam, the construction of the dam and locks began in 1815 and was completed in 1818.

== Recreation ==
The section of river between the dam and the Philadelphia Canoe Club features Class II whitewater and is used by the club for training.

== See also ==
- List of crossings of the Schuylkill River
