= Brockton, Pennsylvania =

Unincorporated community in Pennsylvania, US

Brockton
- Unincorporated community
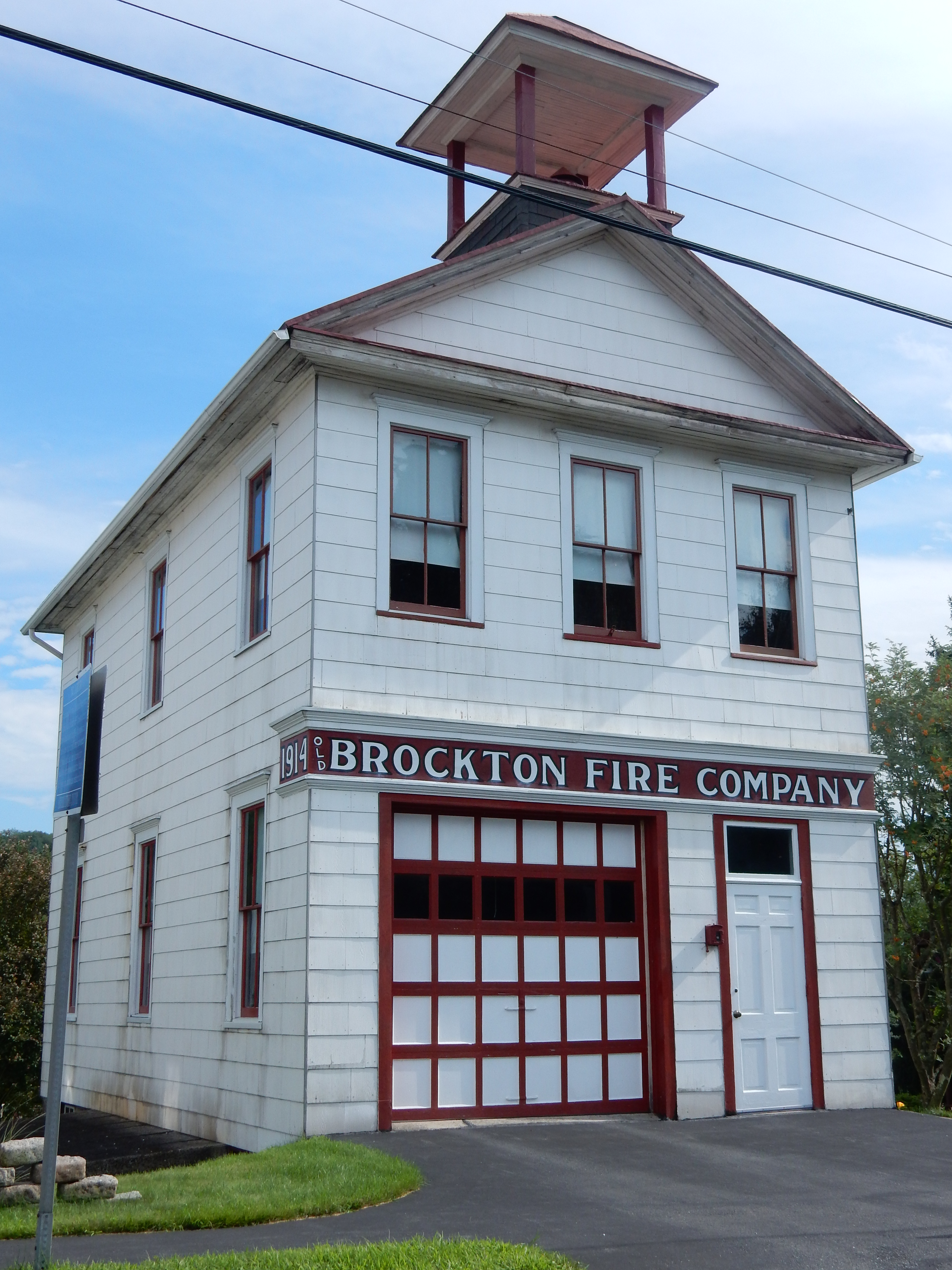
- Old Brockton Fire Co.

- Location within the state of Pennsylvania Brockton (the United States)
- Coordinates: 40°44′54″N 76°4′7″W
- Country: United States
- State: Pennsylvania
- County: Schuylkill
- Elevation: 778 ft (237 m)
- Time zone: UTC-5 (Eastern (EST))
  - Summer (DST): UTC-4 (EDT)
- ZIP codes: 17925
- Area code: 570
- GNIS feature ID: 1170307

Brockton is an unincorporated community and coal town in Schuylkill County, Pennsylvania, United States. It was also called Patterson.

== Demographics ==
Historical population
| Census | Pop. | Note | %± |

The United States Census Bureau defined Brockton as a census designated place (CDP) in 2023.

== Gallery ==
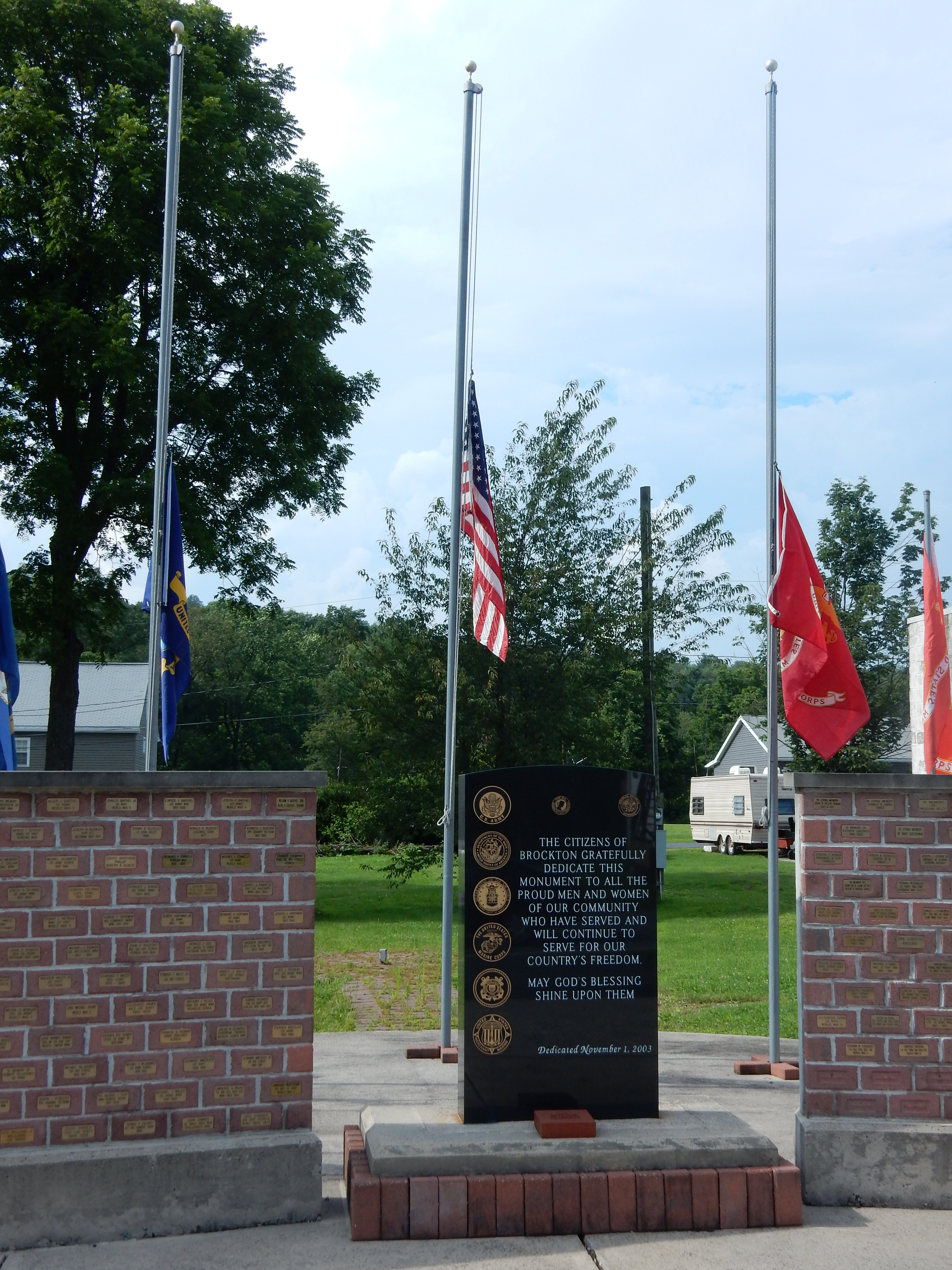
Brockton War Memorial.

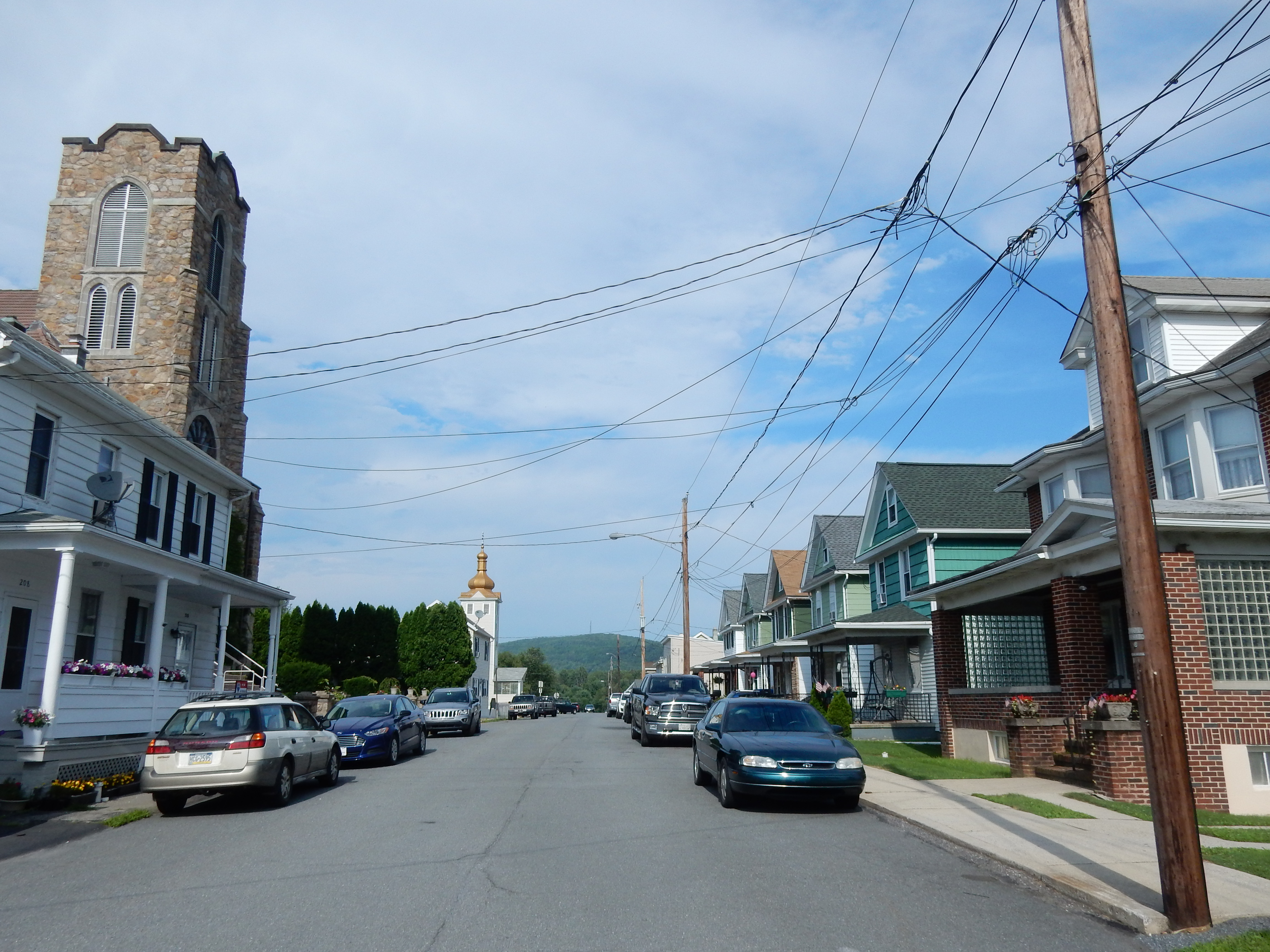
Green Street.

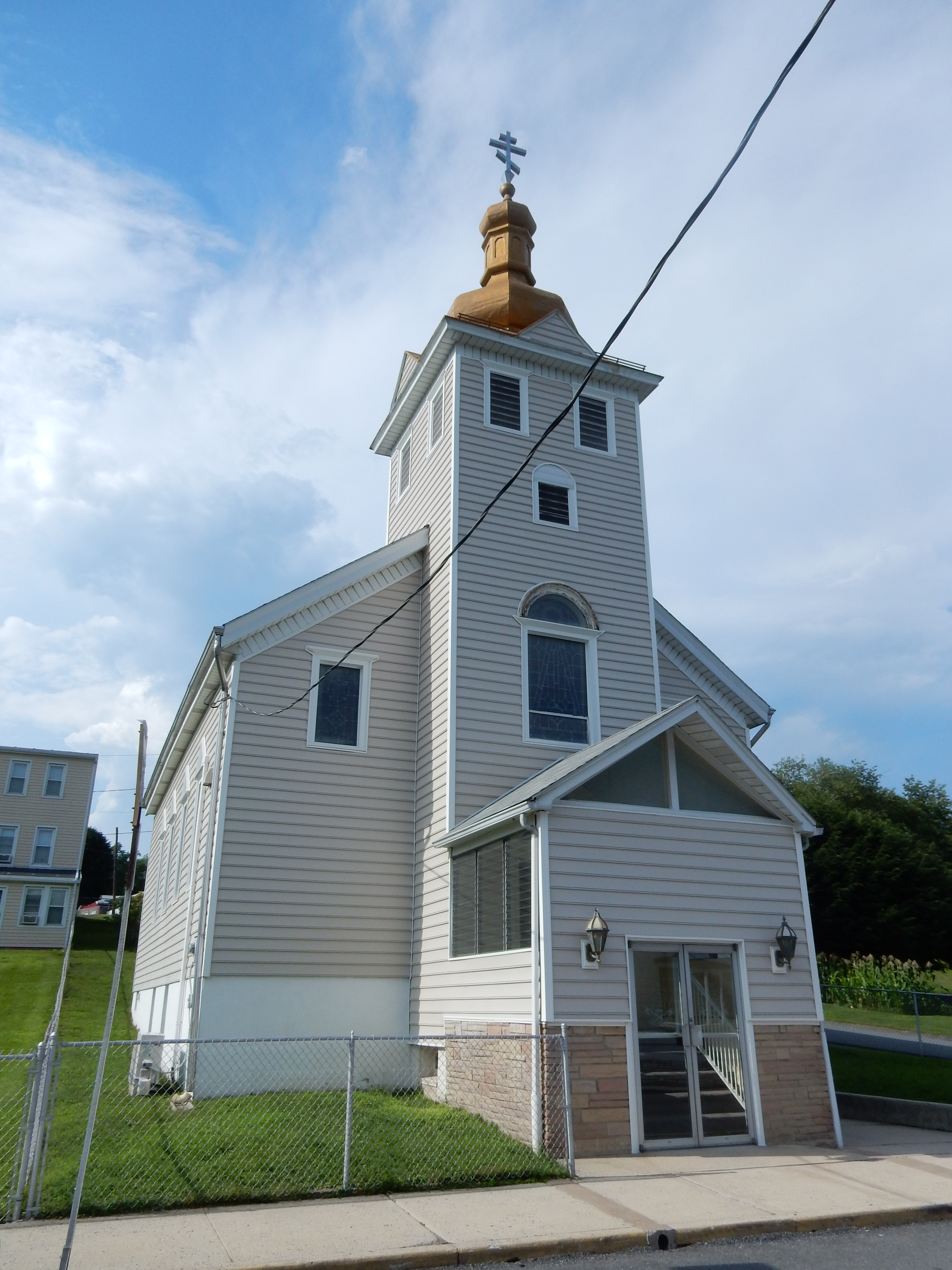
St. Mary's Byzantine Catholic Church

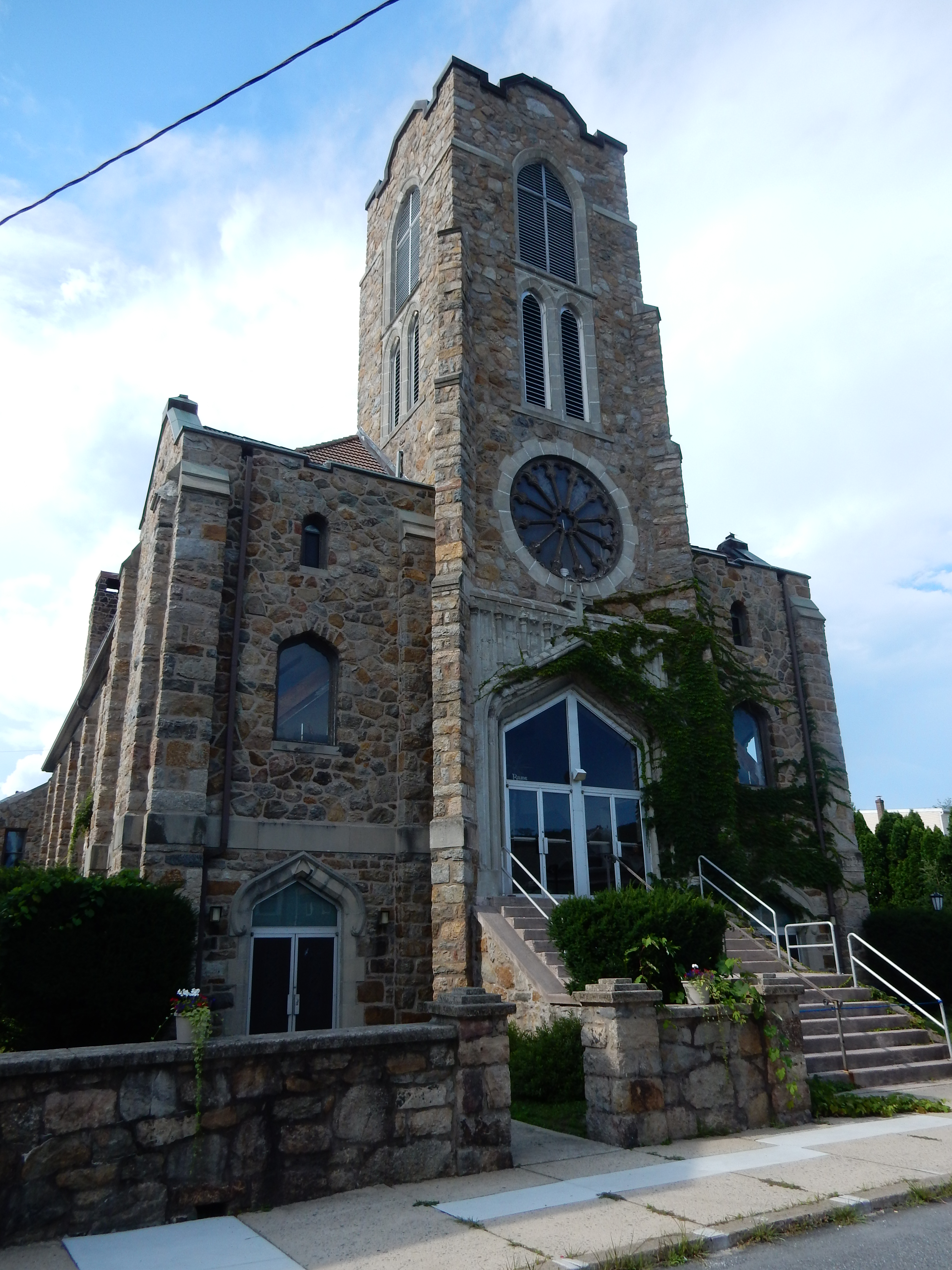
St. Joseph's Church.
