= Schuylkill River =

River in eastern Pennsylvania, United States

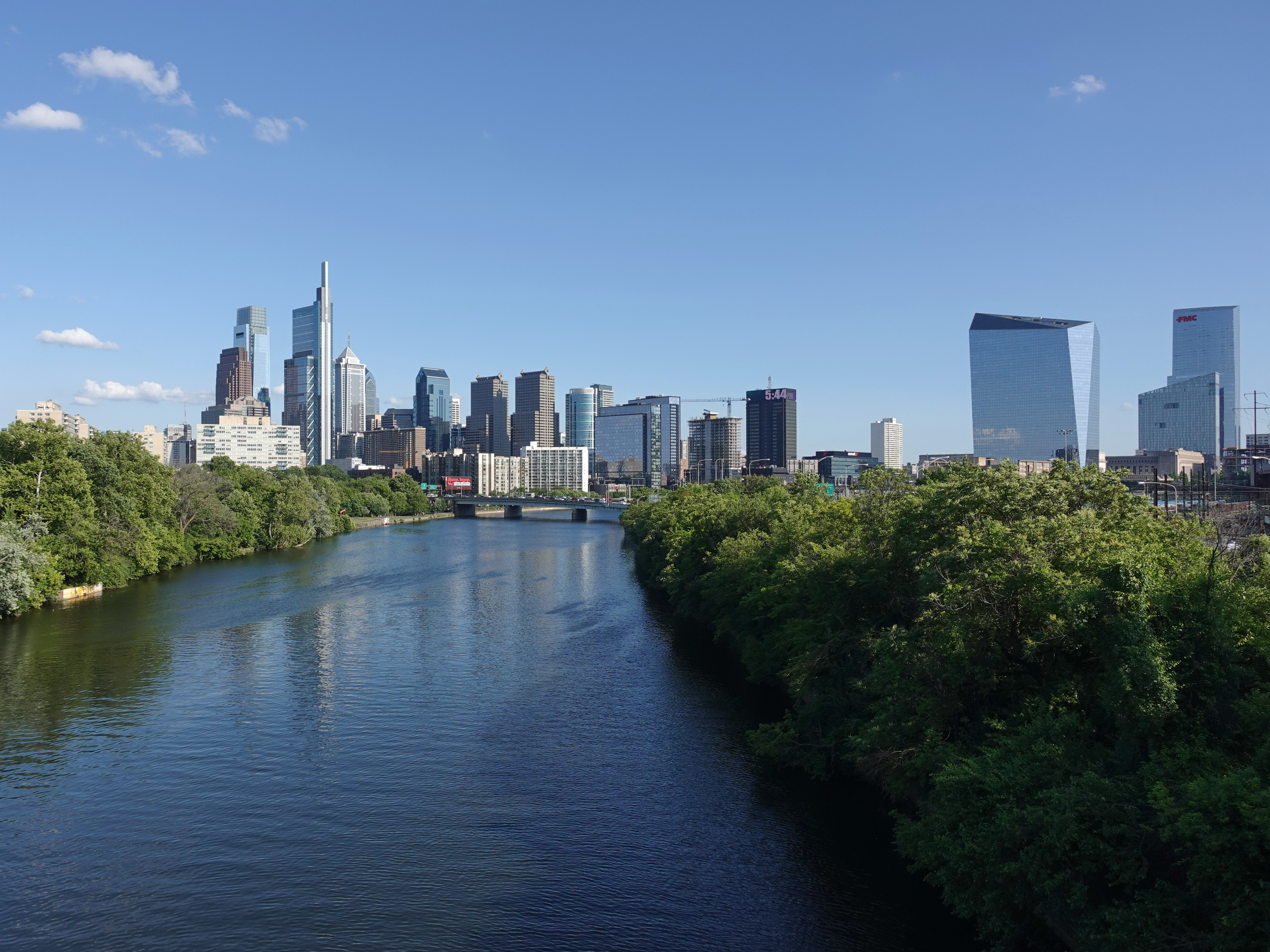
- The Schuylkill River with Center City, Philadelphia's skyline in the background, May 2024

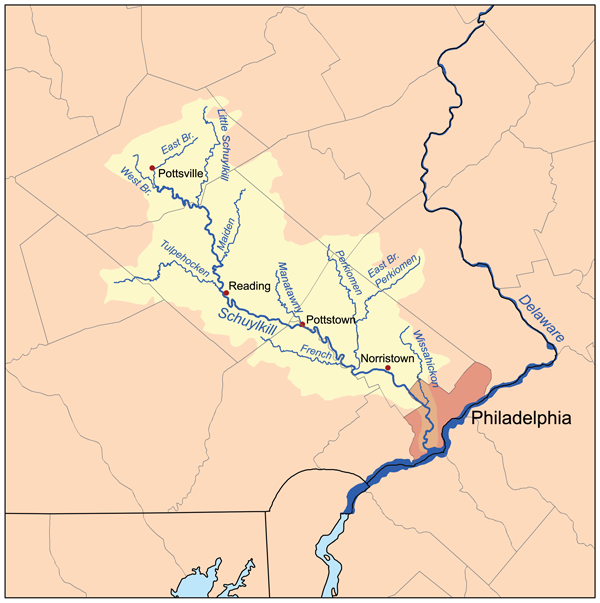
- The river's watershed drains parts of the western side of Broad Mountain and the ridge-and-valley Appalachians of the south central Pennsylvania Coal Region.
- Etymology: "hidden/skulking creek" in Dutch

Location
- Country: United States
- State: Pennsylvania
- Counties: Philadelphia, Montgomery, Chester, Berks, Schuylkill
- Cities: Philadelphia, Norristown, Pottstown, Pottsville, Reading

Physical characteristics
- Source: East Branch Schuylkill River
  - location: Tuscarora, Schuylkill County, Pennsylvania, United States
  - coordinates: 40°46′24″N 76°01′20″W
  - elevation: 1,540 ft (470 m)
- 2nd source: West Branch Schuylkill River
  - location: Minersville, Schuylkill County, Pennsylvania, United States
  - coordinates: 40°42′51″N 76°18′46″W
  - elevation: 1,140 ft (350 m)
- Source confluence
  - location: Schuylkill Haven, Schuylkill County, Pennsylvania, United States
  - coordinates: 40°38′01″N 76°10′49″W
  - elevation: 520 ft (160 m)
- Mouth: Delaware River
  - location: Philadelphia, Pennsylvania, United States
  - coordinates: 39°53′04″N 75°11′41″W
  - elevation: 0 ft (0 m)
- Length: 135 mi (217 km)
- Basin size: 2,000 sq mi (5,200 km^{2})
- Discharge
  - location: Philadelphia
  - average: 2,875 cu ft/s (81.4 m^{3}/s)
  - minimum: 995 cu ft/s (28.2 m^{3}/s)
  - maximum: 40,300 cu ft/s (1,140 m^{3}/s)
- Discharge
  - location: Berne
  - average: 1,120 cu ft/s (32 m^{3}/s)

Basin features
- Tributaries
  - left: Little Schuylkill River, Perkiomen Creek
  - right: Tulpehocken Creek, French Creek

The Schuylkill River (/ˈskuːl.kɪl/ SKOOL-kil, locally /ˈskuː.kəl/ SKOO-kəl) is a river in eastern Pennsylvania in the United States. It flows for 135 miles (217 km) from Pottsville southeast to Philadelphia, the sixth-largest city in the US, where it joins the Delaware River as one of its largest tributaries.

The river's watershed of about 2,000 mi^{2} (5,180 km^{2}) lies entirely within the state of Pennsylvania, stretching from the Ridge-and-Valley Appalachians through the Piedmont to the Atlantic Plain.

Historically the Schuylkill lay within the territory of the Susquehannock and Lenape peoples. In 1682, William Penn founded the city of Philadelphia between the Schuylkill and Delaware rivers on lands purchased from the Lenape Indian tribe. The Schuylkill River became key in the development of the city and the surrounding region.

While long used for transport, the river was made fully navigable via the Schuylkill Canal in 1825, followed by the construction of the Reading Railroad Main Line in 1838 and the Schuylkill Branch of the Pennsylvania Railroad in 1884. Through these corridors, millions of tons of anthracite coal flowed down the Schuylkill from the Coal Region to its north in Northeast Pennsylvania. (Note: The Panther Creek Valley and other tributaries of the Little Schuylkill River thread through the most heavily endowed coal valleys in the southern coal region.) The canal was abandoned in 1931, while the Schuylkill Expressway was completed in 1959.

Industrial pollution and mining silt plagued the river in the 19th and 20th centuries. Early concerns over water quality led to the creation of Fairmount Park in 1812. Protections came with the 1972 passing of the Clean Water Act, and the Schuylkill was designated as the first Pennsylvania Scenic River in 1978. Water quality has largely recovered in the years since.

The Schuylkill River above Fairmount Dam has been a major rowing venue since the founding of the Schuylkill Navy in 1858. In recent decades the Schuylkill River Trail cycle and foot path has been constructed along the river. The Schuylkill Heritage Corridor was designated a Pennsylvania Heritage Park in 1995 and a National Heritage Area in 2000 to promote the river's historic, environmental, and recreational significance.

== Course ==
The source of the Schuylkill's eastern branch is in heavily mined land, one ridgeline south of Tuscarora Lake along a drainage divide with the Little Schuylkill River, about a mile east of the village of Tuscarora and about a mile west of Tamaqua, at Tuscarora Springs in Schuylkill County. Tuscarora Lake is one source of the Little Schuylkill.

The West Branch starts near Minersville and joins the eastern branch at the town of Schuylkill Haven. It then combines with the Little Schuylkill River downstream in the town of Port Clinton. The Tulpehocken Creek joins it at the western edge of Reading. Wissahickon Creek joins it in northwest Philadelphia. Other major tributaries include: Maiden Creek, Manatawny Creek, French Creek, and Perkiomen Creek.

=== Philadelphia ===
At Roxborough, Philadelphia, the river flows over Flat Rock Dam which diverts some water into the Manayunk Canal, creating Venice Island. Following a short section of rapids, the river reaches Manayunk and enters the 5 mi (8.0 km) long Fairmount Pool behind Fairmount Dam. Just downstream at East Falls, the impounded river crosses the Atlantic Seaboard Fall Line and over the submerged Falls of the Schuylkill, the river's historic head of tide. From here the Schuylkill winds through Fairmount Park, where the river is used as a rowing venue by the Schuylkill Navy, before passing Boathouse Row and flowing over Fairmount Dam at the Water Works in the Fairmount neighborhood.

Below Fairmount Dam the Schuylkill becomes tidal and navigable for its final 8.5 mi (13.7 km) length. The tidal river forms a major barrier between Center City and West Philadelphia, resulting in a high density of river crossings. These include the only tunnel under the Schuylkill, the Market Street subway. Below Center City the river is heavily industrialized, with Bartram's Garden and Schuylkill Banks hosting the only undeveloped shoreline along the tidal section.

The Schuylkill River joins the Delaware River at the Philadelphia Navy Yard just upstream of Fort Mifflin and the Philadelphia International Airport.

=== Major towns ===
- Pottsville
- Reading
- Pottstown
- Phoenixville
- Norristown
- Conshohocken
- Lower Merion
- Philadelphia

== Name ==
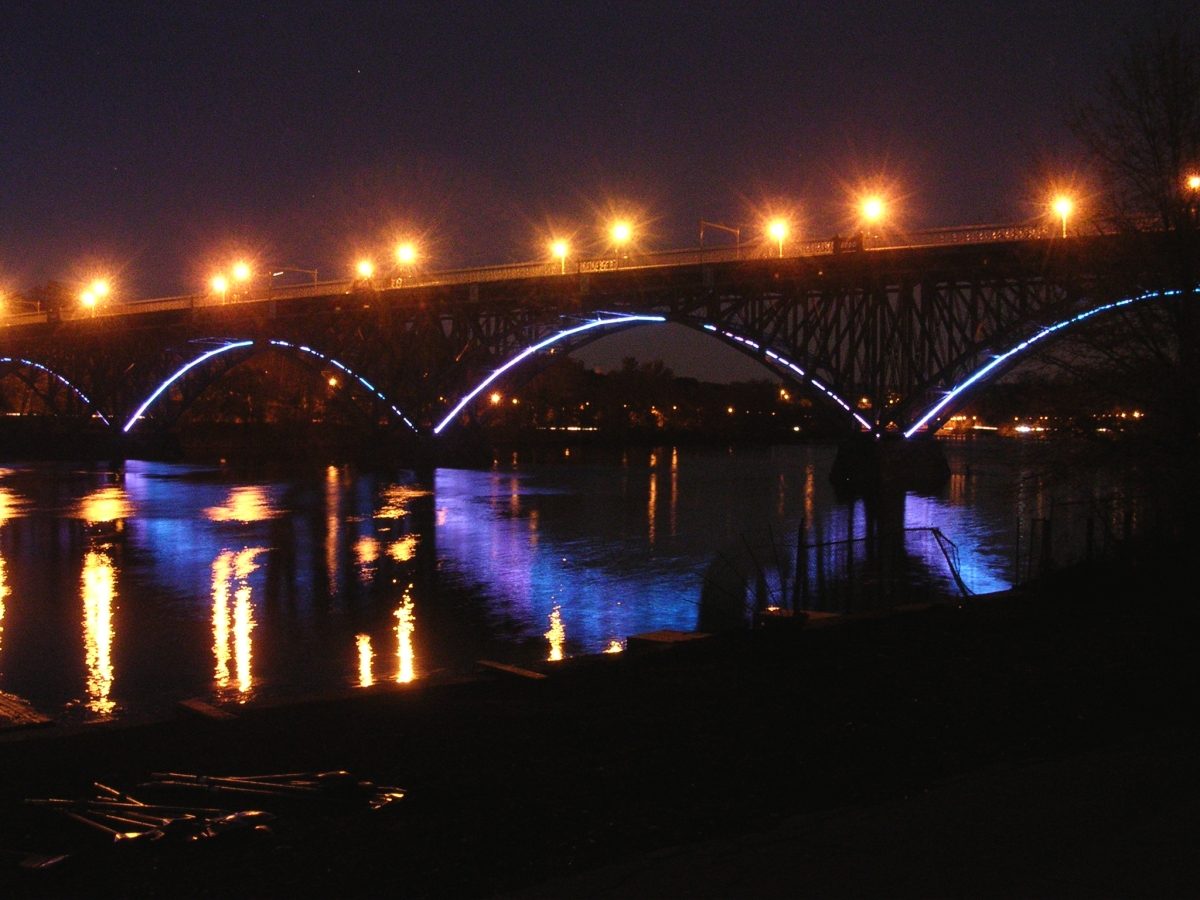
The Strawberry Mansion Bridge in Fairmount Park at dusk

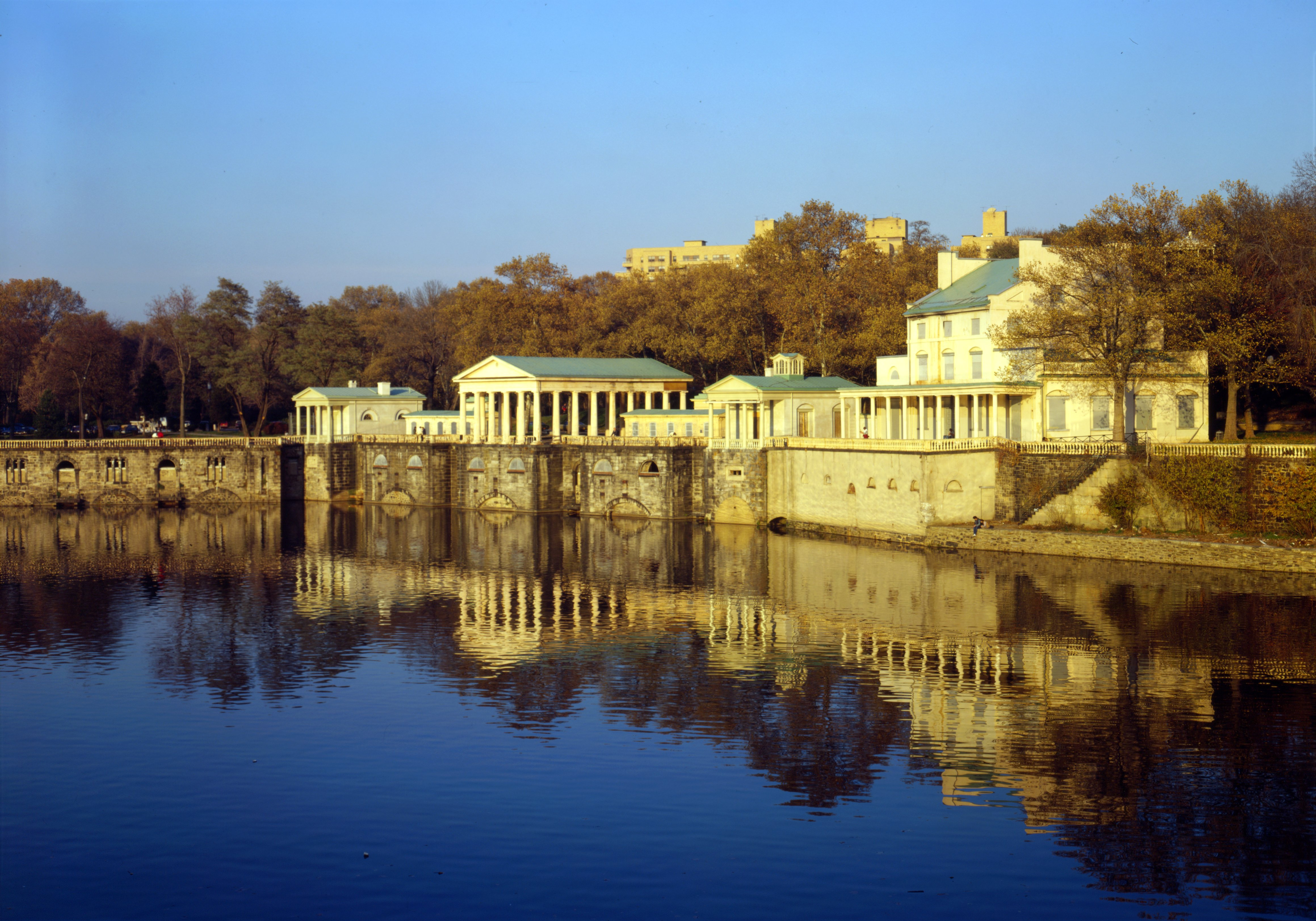
The Fairmount Water Works on the Schuylkill River were once the source of Philadelphia's water supply and are now an attraction in Fairmount Park.

The Schuylkill's name derives from the Dutch words schuilen, meaning to hide, and kil, meaning stream, apparently because of the "retired and hidden situation of its mouth". According to John Heckewelder, a missionary who worked among the local Lenape Indians, the native name for the river was Ganshowe-hánne, meaning "roaring stream". The river was also sometimes called the Manaiunk in European sources, which derives from a Lenape place-name meaning "place to drink". This name appears on a Swedish map of 1655 in the form Menejackse Kijl.

== History ==
=== Pre-settlement ===
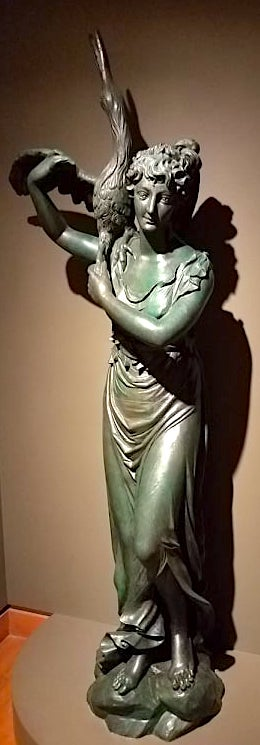
An 1872 allegory of the Schuylkill River by William Rush now on display at the Philadelphia Museum of Art

The mighty Susquehannock confederation claimed the area along the Schuylkill as a hunting ground, as they did to the lands down along the Chesapeake Bay to the left bank Potomac River across from the Powhatan Confederacy when traders first stopped in the Delaware River and settlers arrived in the first decade of the 1600s. With ample tributary streams, the Schuylkill was a key site in the early years of the Beaver Wars, during which the Lenape tribe became tributary to the victorious Susquehannocks. The Susquehannocks were an Iroquoian people also often in contention with their relatives: the Erie people west and northwest through the gaps of the Allegheny in eastern Ohio and northwestern Pennsylvania between the upper Allegheny River and Lake Erie and the Five Nations of the Iroquois, another Amerindian confederation eastwards from the right bank of the Genesee River through the Finger Lakes region of Upstate New York down the St. Lawrence River.

The Lenape had settlements on the river, including Nittabakonck ("place where heroes reside"), a village on the east bank just south of the confluence of Wissahickon Creek, and the Passyunk site, on the west bank where the Schuylkill meets the Delaware River.

=== 18th century ===
American patriot paper maker Frederick Bicking owned a fishery on the river prior to the American Revolution, and Thomas Paine tried in vain to interest the citizens in funding an iron bridge over this river, before abandoning "pontifical works" on account of the French Revolution. The Hessian Camp, which held POWs during the American Revolution, was located on the banks of the Schuylkill outside Reading for multiple years until it was relocated to a larger site on Mt. Penn.

=== 19th century ===
Over the next few decades, industrialists Josiah White and protege and partner Erskine Hazard built iron industries at the Falls of the Schuylkill during the Jefferson's administration, where White built a suspension bridge with cables made from their wire mill. During the War of 1812, the two took delivery of an ark of anthracite coal which was notoriously difficult to combust reliably and experimented with ways to use it industrially, providing the knowledge to successfully begin resolving the ongoing decades long energy crises around eastern cities. The two then heavily backed the flagging effort to improve navigation on the Schuylkill, which efforts date back to legislation measures as early as 1762.

By 1816, needing energy resources and disenchanted with the lack of urgency found in other investors to accelerate the anemic and underfunded construction rate of the Schuylkill Canal, the two jumped to option the mining rights of the Lehigh Coal & Navigation Company, which disenchanted stockholders were giving up on. They then waited until a charter to improve the Lehigh went delinquent, resulting in two groups of investors forming two complementary companies in 1818 that jump-started the Industrial Revolution: the Lehigh Coal Company and the Lehigh Coal & Navigation Company. Following White's plan, the latter company improved down river navigation on the Lehigh River, using his Bear Trap Locks design to deliver over 365 tons of anthracite to Philadelphia docks by December 1820, four years ahead of promises to Stockholders. The success, along with the pending opening of the first operable sections of New York's Erie Canal spurred stockholders of the Schuylkill Canal to finally fund the works. A project which had languished for over a decade got capitalized and began operations in 1822—the same year the Lehigh companies combined into the Lehigh Coal & Navigation Company, having had to raise additional funds for repairs due to badly ice-damaged improvements, a common problem with northern canals.

The success of these projects and the rosy promise of anthracite (a new wonder fuel in the day) to alleviate energy problems spurred canal construction for the next decade in the east, and commercial opportunities funded three decades of investment from Illinois to the Atlantic Ocean, including the ambitious 1824 Main Line of Public Works bill to connect Philadelphia with the newly emerging states of the Northwest Territory via the Allegheny & Ohio valleys at Pittsburgh and to Lake Erie— leveraging the wide-ranging branches of the Susquehanna River in the state's center. In the 1830s railway technology and new railroads grew in leaps and bounds, and the Schuylkill Valley was at the heart of these developments, as well as the new Anthracite iron and mining industries. From 1820 to the 1860s Iron works, foundries, manufacturing mills, blast furnaces, rolling mills, rail yards, rail roads, warehouses and train stations sprang up throughout the valley. Tiny farm villages grew into vibrant company towns then transitioned into small cities as a major industry and supporting businesses transformed local economics and populations swelled.

Restoration of the river has been funded by money left for that purpose in Benjamin Franklin's will.

The river is known to have been on fire more than once throughout history, for example in November 1892 when the surface film of oil that had leaked from nearby oil works at Point Breeze, Philadelphia, was ignited by a match tossed carelessly from a boat, with fatal results.

=== 20th century ===
Silt and coal dust from upstream industries, particularly coal mining and washing operations in the headwaters, led to extensive silting of the river through the early 20th century. The river was shallow and filled with extensive black silt bars. By the early 20th century, upstream coal operations contributed over 3 million tons of silt annually to the river. In 1948, led by then governor James H. Duff, a massive cleanup effort began. Twenty three impounding basins were excavated along the river, to receive dredged silt. The 1945 Desilting Act helped begin this cleanup task.

=== 21st century ===
The quality of the river has improved much over the past decades. A fish ladder to support shad migration has been constructed at the Manayunk dam. Mayfly hatches (signifying good water quality) now occur yearly along the Montgomery sections of the river.

The body of Dominique "Rem'mie" Fells was found in the river in June 2020.

== Transportation ==
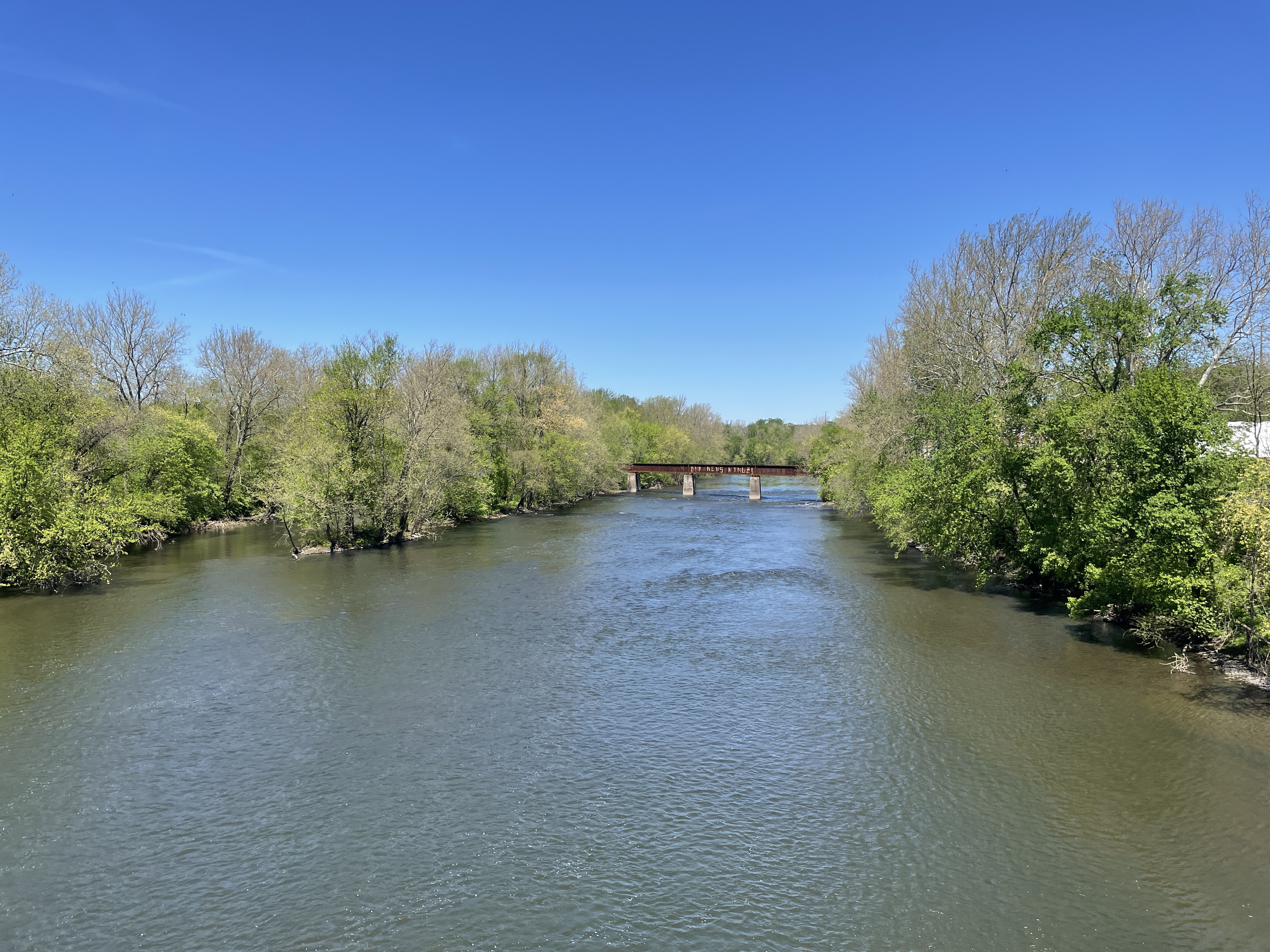
The Schuylkill River between Royersford and Spring City

The Schuylkill River valley was an important thoroughfare in the eras of canals and railroads. The river itself, the Schuylkill Canal, the Reading Railroad, and the Pennsylvania Railroad were vital shipping conduits from the second decade of the 19th century through the mid-20th century. The rise of trucking capabilities and state & county development of road and highway networks progressively took increasing amounts of business away from both competing transport industries. By the mid-1930s the canals inflexibility and a geographically limited pool of customers steadily shifting energy usage away from anthracite doomed most eastern canals, so the Lehigh, Delaware and Schuylkill Canals all ceased operations during the Great Depression years. The zooming rise of automobile ownership post-World War II, the development of suburbs, and dispersal of industrial buildings into far flung parks serviced by the government supported highways and new interstate highways doomed intercity rail transport. Interstate Commerce Committee regulations required railway operating companies to maintain passenger rail services past their economic viability, further imperiling the railroad's profits and leading to a widespread collapse of the industry in the 1960s and 1970s.

Rail freight still uses many of the same valley rights-of-way that the 19th-century railroads used. Passenger and commuter rail service is more limited. In the 21st century, the old rail bed rights-of-way along the river between Philadelphia and Norristown contain SEPTA's Manayunk/Norristown Line, formerly Reading Railroad and the Schuylkill River Trail.

There are efforts to extend both rail and trail farther upriver than they currently reach. The Schuylkill River Trail continues upriver from Norristown to Mont Clare, and designers plan to connect it to sections above Pottstown. SEPTA Regional Rail service currently does not go farther upriver than Norristown.

The Schuylkill Expressway (Interstate 76) and U.S. Route 422 follow the course of the river from Philadelphia to Valley Forge to Reading. Above Reading, Pennsylvania Route 61 continues along the main river valley to Schuylkill Haven, then follows the east branch to Pottsville. U.S. Route 209 continues along the east branch of the river to its head in Tuscarora. In Philadelphia, Kelly Drive, formerly East River Drive, and Martin Luther King Jr. Drive, formerly West River Drive, flank the river.

== Recreation ==
The Schuylkill River is popular with rowing, dragon boat, and outrigger paddling enthusiasts. The Schuylkill Navy was established on the riverside adjacent to the city of Philadelphia to promote amateur rowing in 1858. The Dad Vail Regatta, an annual rowing competition, is held on the river near Boathouse Row, as is the annual BAYADA Home Health Care Regatta, featuring disabled rowers from all over the continent, and in autumn the annual Head of the Schuylkill Regatta takes place in Philadelphia. Also, the Stotesbury Cup Regatta, the biggest high school regatta in the world, takes place there. The Chinese sport of dragon boat racing was introduced to the United States on the Schuylkill in 1983, and two major dragon boat regattas are held there in June and October of each year.

The section between Flat Rock Dam and the Philadelphia Canoe Club is used by whitewater canoeing and kayaking enthusiasts. Water skiing, swimming and other aquatic sports are also common outside of Philadelphia city limits. Since 1999, the Schuylkill River Greenway Association has held an annual sojourn, leading hundreds of paddlers along nearly the full stretch of the river.

The Schuylkill River Trail, which generally follows the river bank, is a multi-use trail for walking, running, bicycling, rollerblading, and other outdoor activities. The trail presently runs from Philadelphia, through Manayunk to the village of Mont Clare, the latter of which are the locations of the last two remaining watered stretches of the Schuylkill Canal. There is also a section of trail starting at Pottstown and running upriver toward Reading. Plans are underway to complete the trail from the Delaware River to Reading.

== In popular culture ==
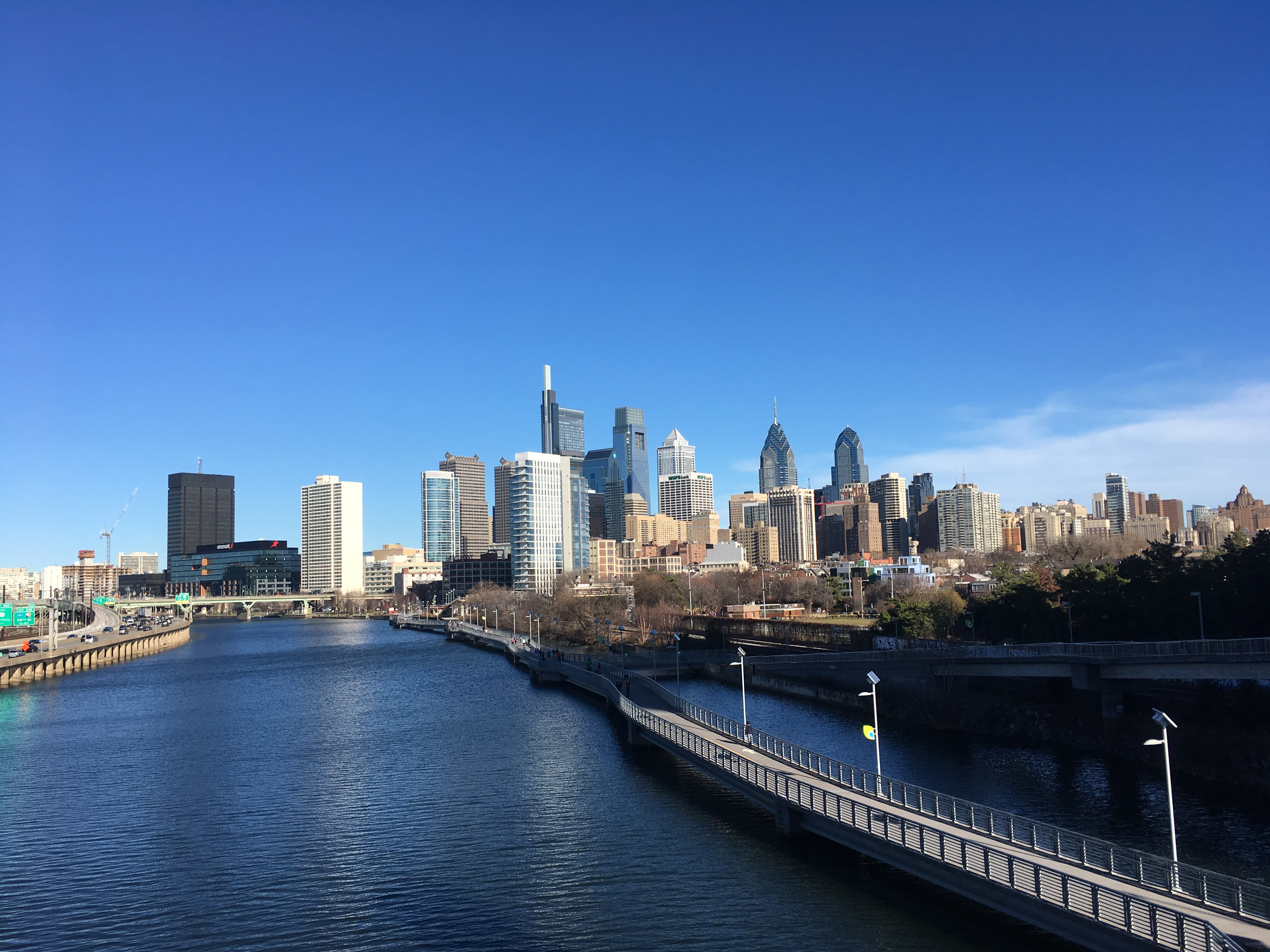
The Schuylkill River looking north toward Center City Philadelphia from South Street Bridge in January 2020

=== Literature ===
The Schuylkill River is the setting of the fictional estate White Acre in Elizabeth Gilbert's 2013 novel The Signature of All Things, based on The Woodlands.

=== Music ===
Philadelphia musician Kurt Vile refers to the river in his album Philadelphia's Been Good to Me, on the track of the same name, the sixth on the album. Vile refers to the river as difficult to spell and polluted as hell, But it runs through my town and I ain't puttin' it down.

== See also ==
- Geography of Pennsylvania
- List of cities and towns along the Schuylkill River
- List of crossings of the Schuylkill River
- List of Pennsylvania rivers
