= Pennsylvania Route 901 =

State highway in Pennsylvania, US

Pennsylvania Route 901

Route information
- Maintained by PennDOT
- Length: 26.370 mi (42.438 km)
- Existed: 1928–present

Major junctions
- West end: PA 61 in Coal Township
- PA 54 in Mount Carmel Township; I-81 in Foster Township; US 209 in Pottsville
- East end: PA 183 in Cressona

Location
- Country: United States
- State: Pennsylvania
- Counties: Northumberland, Schuylkill

Highway system
- Pennsylvania State Route System; Interstate; US; State; Scenic; Legislative
← PA 900	→ PA 902

Pennsylvania Route 901 (PA 901) is a 26.4-mile-long (42.5 km) state route located in eastern Pennsylvania. The western terminus of the route is at PA 61 in the Coal Township hamlet of Ranshaw. Its eastern terminus is at PA 183 in Cressona. PA 901 runs northwest-southeast through forested mountains in the Coal Region within Northumberland and Schuylkill counties. The route runs concurrent with PA 54 between Locust Gap and Merrian in Mount Carmel Township before it leaves Northumberland County for Schuylkill County. PA 901 has an interchange with Interstate 81 (I-81) and continues southeast to Minersville. The route runs concurrent with U.S. Route 209 (US 209) to Pottsville before it splits south and continues to PA 183.

PA 901 was designated in 1928 along a short loop of US 209 between Llewellyn and west of Pottsville, bypassing Minersville to the south. US 209 and PA 901 switched alignments in the 1930s, with PA 901 routed to run from US 209 in Llewellyn northeast to Minersville and southeast to US 209 west of Pottsville. PA 901 east of Minersville became a divided highway in the 1960s. The route was rerouted and extended northwest to PA 61 in 1971 and extended south to PA 183 in the 1980s.

== Route description ==
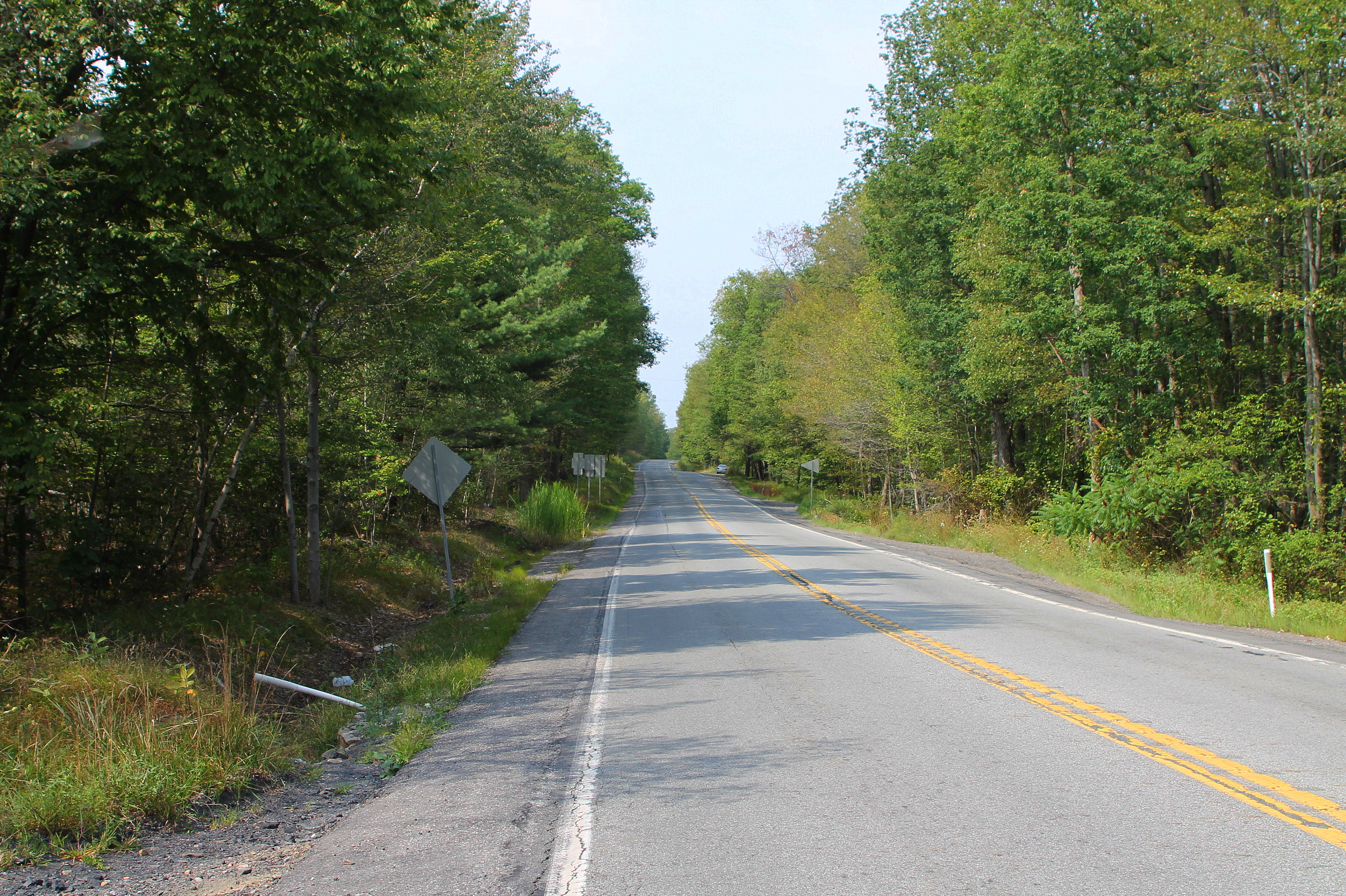
PA 901 in Mount Carmel Township

PA 901 begins at a partial cloverleaf interchange with PA 61 east of the city of Shamokin in Coal Township, Northumberland County, heading south on a two-lane undivided road. The route passes some development and curves southeast into forested areas, running to the east of the Shamokin Valley Railroad and following Shamokin Creek. The road passes over the railroad line and continues east, running to the south of the tracks and passing through Excelsior. PA 901 crosses into Mount Carmel Township, running through more forests and reaching an intersection with PA 54. At this point, PA 901 turns south to form a concurrency with PA 54 on Locust Gap Highway, passing through a forested gap in Mahanoy Mountain and running to the west of a Reading Blue Mountain and Northern Railroad line. The road curves southeast and passes through the residential community of Locust Gap, heading east through more forests at this point. PA 901 splits from PA 54 by turning southeast to remain along Locust Gap Highway, a three-lane road with two eastbound lanes and one westbound lane.

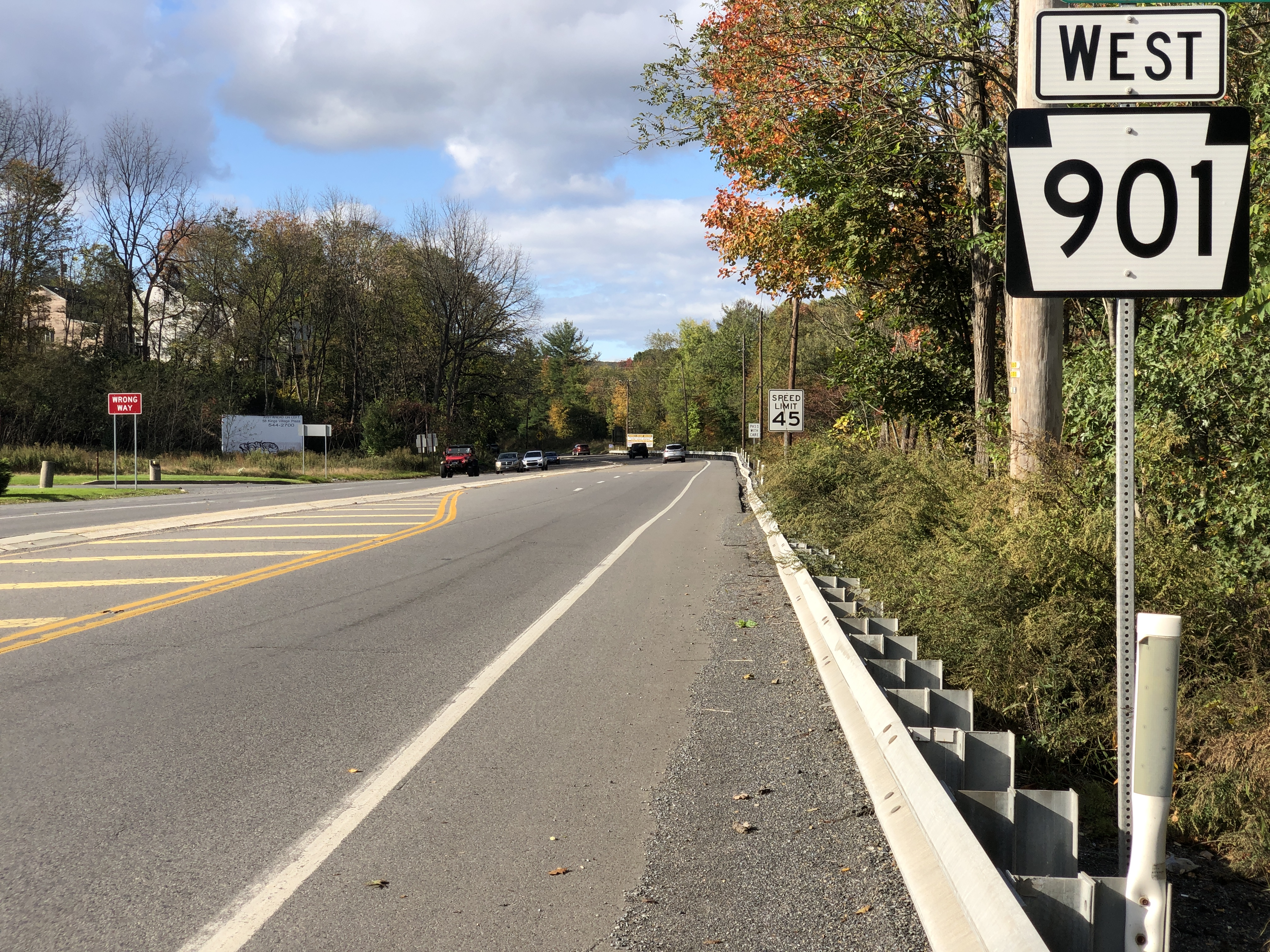
PA 901 westbound past US 209 in Norwegian Township

PA 901 crosses into Butler Township in Schuylkill County and becomes Fairgrounds Road, which has two westbound lanes and one eastbound lane, and continues through more forested mountain areas. The route turns to the east as a two-lane road before curving south into the community of Lavelle, where it passes homes and businesses. The road heads into a mix of farms and woods with some residences, becoming a three-lane road with two westbound lanes and one eastbound lane. PA 901 becomes two lanes again as it crosses the Mahanoy Creek into Barry Township and becoming Sunbury Road, passing through more rural areas. The route gains a second eastbound lane and curves east into more forested areas, ascending Broad Mountain. The road turns southeast into Foster Township and narrows back to two total lanes as it reaches a diamond interchange with I-81 near the Schuylkill County Airport. PA 901 winds through more wooded areas with some fields and development, passing through Mount Pleasant and Buck Run. The road turns east and runs through more forested areas of Broad Mountain, entering Cass Township. The route turns south into wooded residential areas and passes through Primrose.

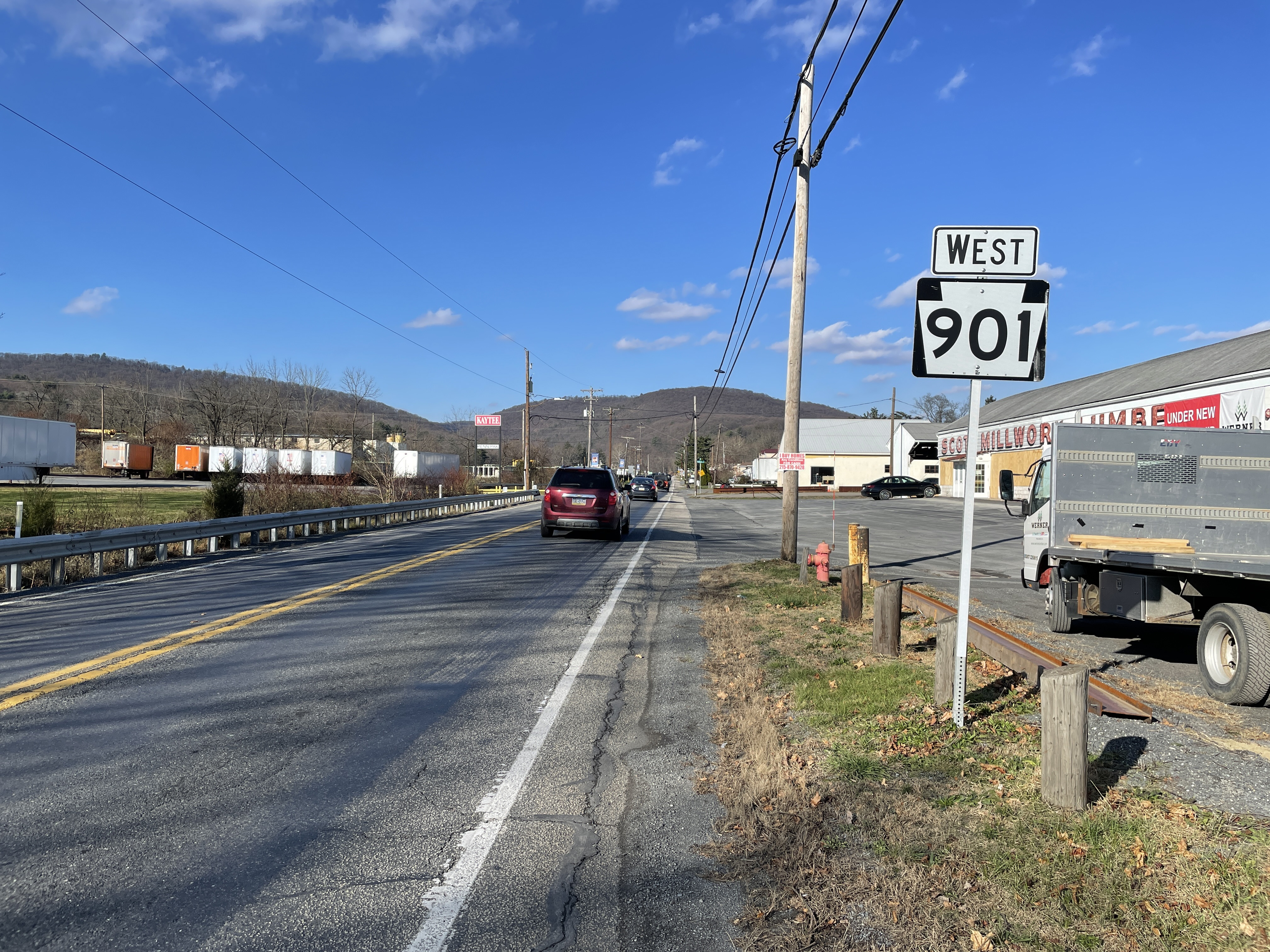
PA 901 westbound past PA 183 in Cressona

PA 901 curves east again through more woods and heads into the borough of Minersville and becomes Sunbury Street, passing several homes. The route runs through the commercial downtown before turning south onto Pottsville Minersville Highway, a four-lane divided highway. The road heads through business areas, running to the west of a Reading Blue Mountain and Northern Railroad line and the West Branch Schuylkill River. The route straddles the border of Branch Township and Norwegian Township as it continues southeast, reaching an intersection with US 209. At this point, US 209 joins PA 901 and the two routes continue through forested areas with some development, curving to the east. The road becomes West Market Street and crosses over the Reading Blue Mountain and Northern Railroad line before heading across the West Branch Schuylkill River into the city of Pottsville. At this point, PA 901 splits from US 209 by turning south onto two-lane undivided Gordon Nagle Trail. The route heads along the east bank of the river through forested areas, crossing into North Manheim Township and curving to the east. The road passes through an area of fields prior to running through more forests and heading through Glenworth. PA 901 turns southeast and crosses forested Second Mountain. The road heads into areas of residential and commercial development, where it forms a concurrency with PA 183 Truck, before crossing into the borough of Cressona. PA 901 becomes Sillyman Street and, along with PA 183 Truck, reaches its terminus at an intersection with PA 183, where the road continues south as part of that route.

== History ==
When Pennsylvania first legislated routes in 1911, what is now PA 901 was not given a number. PA 901 was designated in 1928 as a loop off US 209 running between Llewellyn and west of Pottsville along an unpaved road, bypassing Minersville to the south. By 1930, the road between east of Shamokin and Locust Gap was an unnumbered, unpaved road. In the 1930s, US 209 and PA 901 swapped alignments. PA 901 routed to head northeast from US 209 in Llewellyn along Minersville Llewellyn Highway to Minersville, where it turned southeast on Pottsville Minersville Highway to end at US 209 west of Pottsville. At this time, the entire length of the route was paved. By the 1930s, the remainder of the present alignment of the route was paved but remained unnumbered. The stretch of PA 901 between Minersville and US 209 west of Pottsville was widened into a divided highway in the 1960s. In 1971, PA 901 was rerouted at Minersville to head northwest to a newly-completed interchange with PA 61 east of Shamokin, with the route designation removed between Llewellyn and Minersville. The section of PA 901 between Lavelle and I-81 was built on a new alignment to replace a winding stretch of road. This extension was made to provide a route for traffic from the Minersville/Pottsville and Shamokin/Mount Carmel areas to the interchange with I-81 northwest of Minersville. In the 1980s, the route was extended south to PA 183 in Cressona.

== Major intersections ==
County	Location	mi	km	Destinations	Notes
Northumberland	Coal Township	0.000	0.000	PA 61 – Mount Carmel, Shamokin	Interchange; western terminus
Northumberland	Mount Carmel Township	4.676	7.525	PA 54 west – Mount Carmel, Kulpmont	West end of PA 54 overlap
Northumberland	Mount Carmel Township	7.554	12.157	PA 54 east – Ashland	East end of PA 54 overlap
Schuylkill	Foster Township	14.417	23.202	I-81 – Hazleton, Harrisburg	Exit 116 on I-81
Schuylkill	Norwegian Township	21.254	34.205	US 209 south (Bunting Street) – Tremont	West end of US 209 overlap
Schuylkill	Pottsville	22.124	35.605	US 209 north (West Market Street) – Pottsville	East end of US 209 overlap
Schuylkill	North Manheim Township	25.771	41.474	PA 183 Truck south	West end of PA 183 Truck overlap
Schuylkill	Cressona	26.370	42.438	PA 183 – Schuylkill Haven, Pottsville, Reading PA 183 Truck ends	Eastern terminus; eastern terminus of PA 183 Truck
1.000 mi = 1.609 km; 1.000 km = 0.621 mi: Concurrency terminus
