= Foster Township, Pennsylvania =

Foster Township is the name of some places in the U.S. state of Pennsylvania:

- Foster Township, Luzerne County, Pennsylvania
- Foster Township, McKean County, Pennsylvania
- Foster Township, Schuylkill County, Pennsylvania
