= West Branch Schuylkill River =

West Branch Schuylkill River West Branch
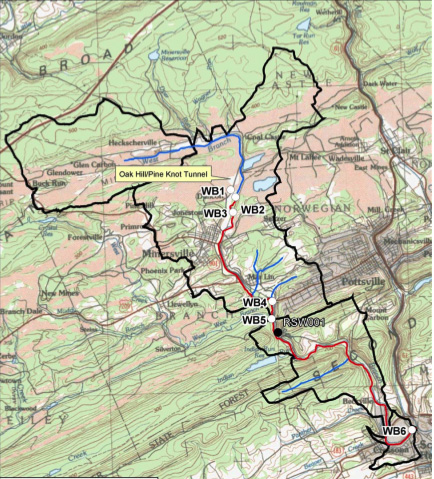
- Topographic map of the West Branch Schuylkill River watershed in Schuylkill County, Pennsylvania with the black line denoting the watershed boundary

Location
- Country: United States
- State: Pennsylvania
- Counties: Schuylkill
- Cities: Buck Run, Glen Dower, Minersville, Pottsville, Cressona, Schuylkill Haven

Physical characteristics
- Source
  - location: Buck Run, Pennsylvania, Schuylkill County, Pennsylvania
  - coordinates: 40°42′45″N 76°18′27″W
  - elevation: 1,200 ft (370 m)
- Mouth: Schuylkill River
  - location: Schuylkill Haven, Pennsylvania, U.S.
  - coordinates: 40°38′3″N 76°10′51″W
  - elevation: 600 ft (180 m)
- Length: 13 mi (21 km)
- Basin size: 21 sq mi (54 km^{2})

Basin features
- Tributaries
  - left: Dyer Run, Wagner Run, Wheeler Creek, Beaver Creek
  - right: Indian Run, Panther Creek

The West Branch Schuylkill River (also known simply as the West Branch) is an approximately 12.9-mile-long (20.8 km) tributary of the Schuylkill River in central Schuylkill County, Pennsylvania, with a watershed approximately 21 square miles (54 km^{2}) in size. Several small communities are located in the watershed, which include Beaver Meadows, Buck Run, Glen Dower, Minersville, Pottsville, Cressona, and Schuylkill Haven.

Mild amounts of acid mine drainage affect the West Branch and its tributaries. From its headwaters near Interstate 81, the river flows southeast through several water gaps in the Ridge-and-Valley Appalachians, ending at its confluence with the Schuylkill River in Schuylkill Haven.

== Course ==
The West Branch's source is several small ponds east of Interstate 81, near the small community of Buck Run. The river flows east-northeast, paralleling Valley Road and later the Heckscherville Road. Near Heckscherville, it receives small tributaries Dyer Run, Wagner Run, and Wheeler Creek, all on the left bank. It then flows south and southeast past Minersville, and finally east through a narrow canyon, where it receives Indian Run on the right bank.

After exiting the canyon, it turns south and enters an increasingly wide valley. At Cressona, it receives Panther Creek on the right bank and Beaver Creek on the left bank. As the river enters Schuylkill Haven it merges with the Schuylkill River on the right bank.

== See also ==
- List of rivers of Pennsylvania
