= Lavelle-Locustdale, Pennsylvania =

Lavelle-Locustdale
- Former CDP
- Location within the U.S. state of Pennsylvania Lavelle-Locustdale (the United States)
- Coordinates: 40°45′50″N 76°22′50″W
- Country: United States
- State: Pennsylvania
- County: Schuylkill

Area
  - Total: 1.0 sq mi (2.7 km^{2})
  - Land: 1.0 sq mi (2.7 km^{2})

Population (2000)
  - Total: 649
  - Density: 620/sq mi (240/km^{2})
- Time zone: UTC-5 (Eastern (EST))
  - Summer (DST): UTC-4 (EDT)

Lavelle-Locustdale was a census-designated place (CDP) in Schuylkill County, Pennsylvania, United States. The population was 649 at the 2000 census. For the 2010 census the area was split into two CDPs, Lavelle and Locustdale.

== Geography ==
Lavelle-Locustdale was located at 40°45′50″N 76°22′50″W (40.763779, -76.380429).

According to the United States Census Bureau, the CDP had a total area of 1.0 square mile (2.6 km^{2}), all of it land.

== Demographics ==
As of the census of 2000, there were 649 people, 275 households, and 194 families residing in the CDP. The population density was 624.6 inhabitants per square mile (241.2/km^{2}). There were 299 housing units at an average density of 287.7 per square mile (111.1/km^{2}). The racial makeup of the CDP was 98.92% White, 0.77% Asian, 0.31% from other races.

There were 275 households, out of which 25.5% had children under the age of 18 living with them, 61.1% were married couples living together, 6.5% had a female householder with no husband present, and 29.1% were non-families. 26.2% of all households were made up of individuals, and 13.8% had someone living alone who was 65 years of age or older. The average household size was 2.36 and the average family size was 2.84.

In the CDP, the population was spread out, with 18.3% under the age of 18, 6.9% from 18 to 24, 30.2% from 25 to 44, 27.0% from 45 to 64, and 17.6% who were 65 years of age or older. The median age was 42 years. For every 100 females, there were 92.0 males. For every 100 females age 18 and over, there were 94.1 males.

The median income for a household in the CDP was $32,656, and the median income for a family was $49,659. Males had a median income of $38,750 versus $17,614 for females. The per capita income for the CDP was $27,323. None of the families and 2.0% of the population were living below the poverty line, including no under eighteens and none of those over 64.
