= Cressona, Pennsylvania =

Borough in Pennsylvania, US

- Borough
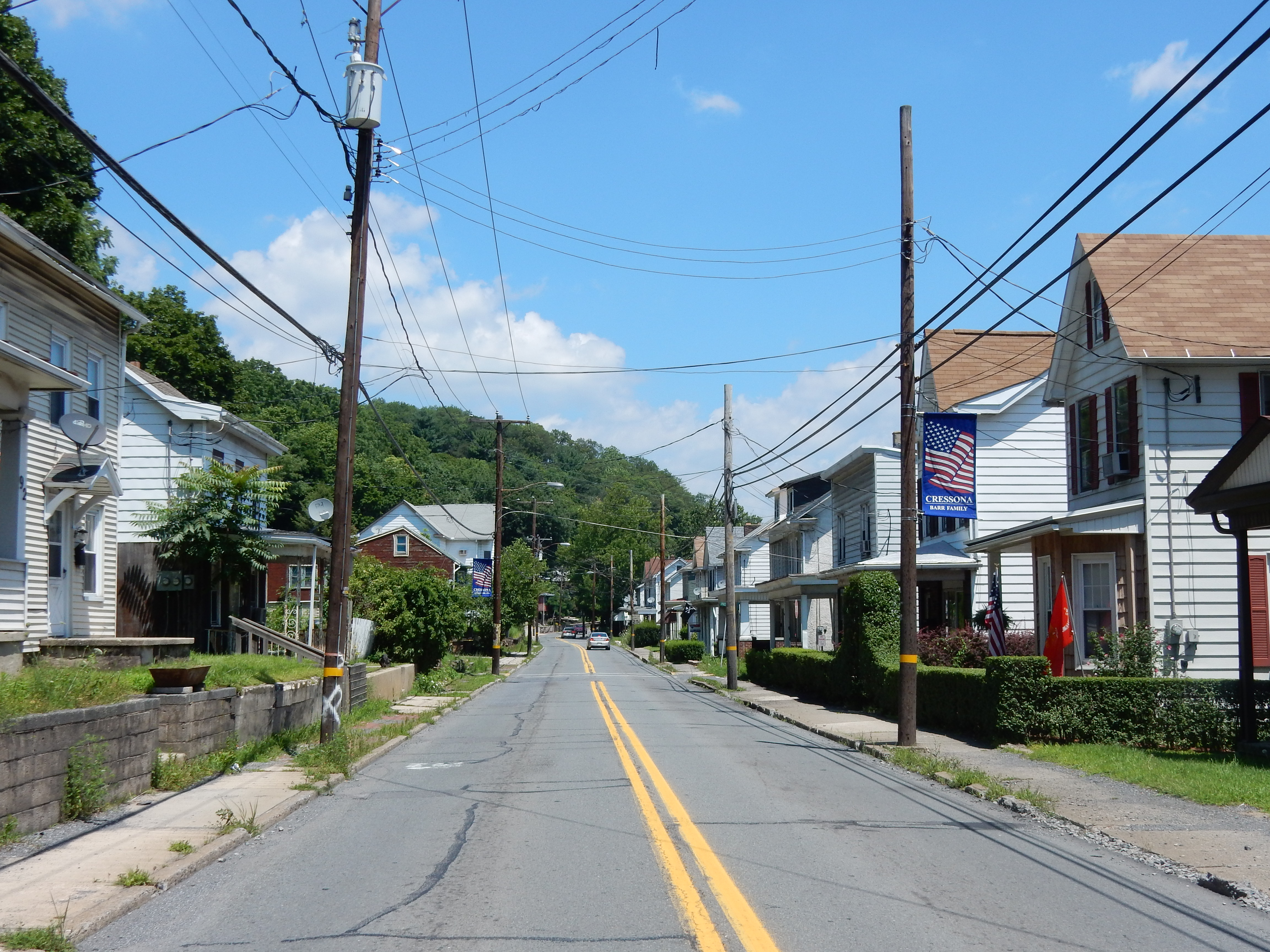
- Pottsville Street in Cressona
- Nickname: C-Town
- Location of Cressona in Schuylkill County, Pennsylvania

- Location of Cressona in Pennsylvania Cressona (the United States)
- Coordinates: 40°37′49″N 76°11′35″W
- Country: United States
- State: Pennsylvania
- County: Schuylkill
- Settled: 1847
- Incorporated: 1857

Government
  - Type: Borough Council

Area
  - Total: 1.00 sq mi (2.58 km^{2})
  - Land: 1.00 sq mi (2.58 km^{2})
  - Water: 0 sq mi (0.00 km^{2})
- Elevation: 541 ft (165 m)

Population (2020)
  - Total: 1,601
  - Density: 1,604.5/sq mi (619.51/km^{2})
- Time zone: UTC-5 (Eastern (EST))
  - Summer (DST): UTC-4 (EDT)
- ZIP Code: 17929
- Area codes: 570 and 272
- FIPS code: 42-17152
- Website: https://cressonaborough.com/

Cressona is a borough in Schuylkill County, Pennsylvania. As of the 2020 census, Cressona had a population of 1,601. Formed in 1857 from part of North Manheim Township, it was founded by and named for John Chapman Cresson, a Philadelphia civil engineer and manager of the Schuylkill Navigation Company, president of the Mine Hill and Schuylkill Haven Railroad, and the chief engineer of Fairmount Park in Philadelphia.

== History ==
Until the Mine Hill Road was built in Cressona, the borough remained mostly wilderness, with some minor agricultural areas. In 1831, the Mine Hill and Schuylkill Railroad was completed, and the tracks went through Cressona. The borough was historically called West Haven, but the name was changed to Cressona. The borough was incorporated on February 2, 1857.

== Geography ==
Cressona is located at 40°37′49″N 76°11′35″W (40.630214, −76.193003). According to the United States Census Bureau, the borough has a total area of 1.0 square mile (2.6 km^{2}), all land.

Cressona is four miles south of Pottsville and is served by state routes 61, 183 and 901. The West Branch Schuylkill River flows through Cressona. Cressona is in the Coal Region of Pennsylvania.

== Demographics ==
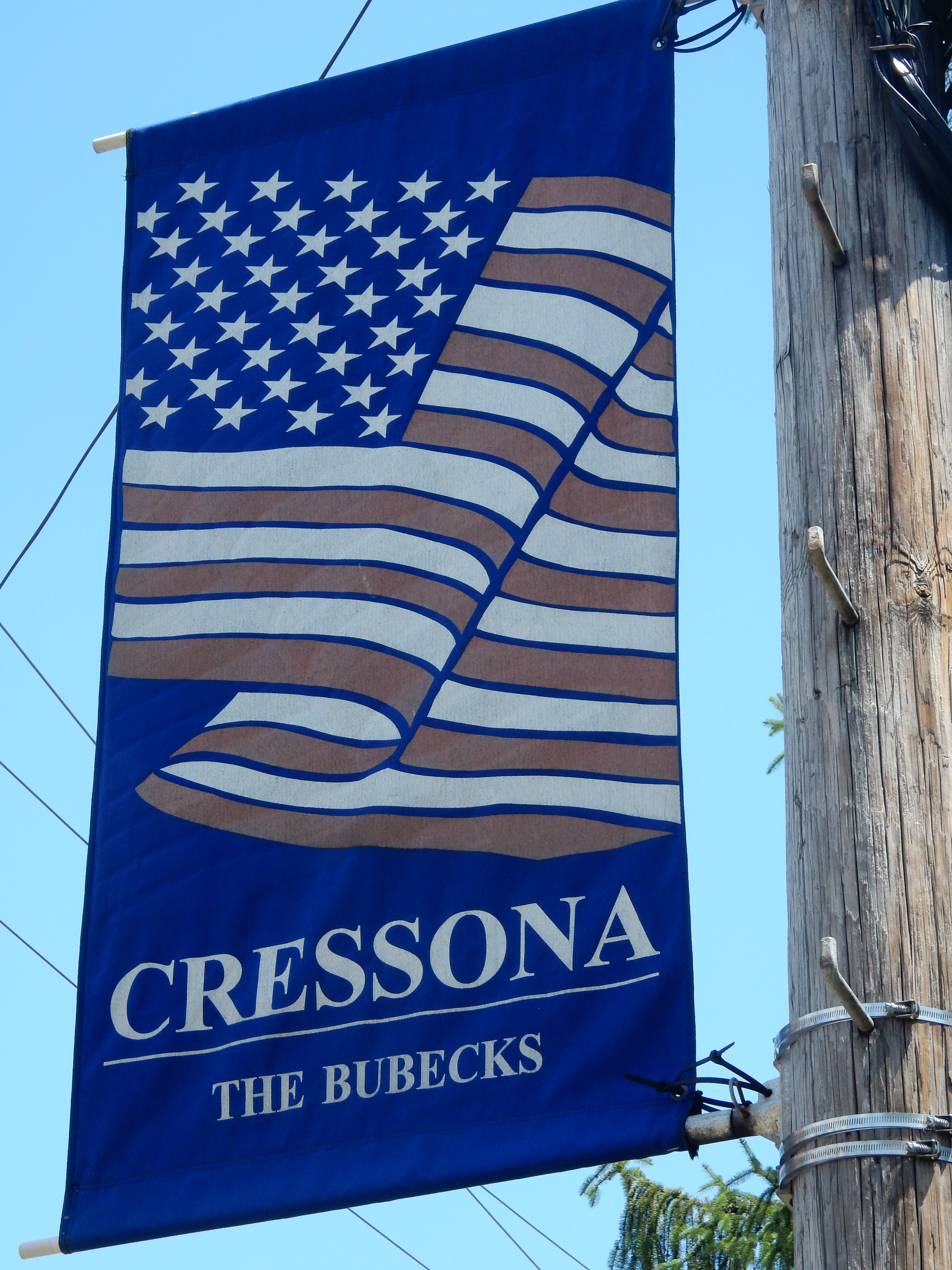
Welcome Sign

Historical population
Census	Pop.	Note	%±
1860	876		—
1870	1,507		72.0%
1880	1,455		−3.5%
1890	1,481		1.8%
1900	1,738		17.4%
1910	1,837		5.7%
1920	1,739		−5.3%
1930	1,946		11.9%
1940	1,695		−12.9%
1950	1,758		3.7%
1960	1,854		5.5%
1970	1,814		−2.2%
1980	1,810		−0.2%
1990	1,694		−6.4%
2000	1,635		−3.5%
2010	1,651		1.0%
2020	1,601		−3.0%
2021 (est.)	1,606	▲	0.3%

At the 2000 census there were 1,635 people, 663 households, and 468 families residing in the borough. The population density was 1,600.3 inhabitants per square mile (617.9/km^{2}). There were 711 housing units at an average density of 695.9 per square mile (268.7/km^{2}). The racial makeup of the borough was 98.53% White, 0.06% African American, 0.92% Asian, 0.12% Pacific Islander, and 0.37% from two or more races. Hispanic or Latino of any race were 0.18%.

Of the 663 households, 30.9% had children under the age of 18 living with them, 56.9% were married couples living together, 10.0% had a female householder with no husband present, and 29.3% were non-families. 24.4% of households were one person, and 12.2% were one person aged 65 or older. The average household size was 2.47 and the average family size was 2.95.

In the borough, the population was spread out, with 22.8% under the age of 18, 7.6% from 18 to 24, 32.8% from 25 to 44, 20.9% from 45 to 64, and 15.9% 65 or older. The median age was 38 years. For every 100 females there were 101.1 males. For every 100 females age 18 and over, there were 96.6 males.

The median household income was $39,783 and the median family income was $42,292. Males had a median income of $33,807 versus $21,563 for females. The per capita income for the borough was $18,285. About 1.3% of families and 3.7% of the population were below the poverty line, including 2.8% of those under age 18 and 3.6% of those age 65 or over.

== Notable person ==
- William Joseph Hammer, electrical engineer and associate of Thomas Edison

== Gallery ==
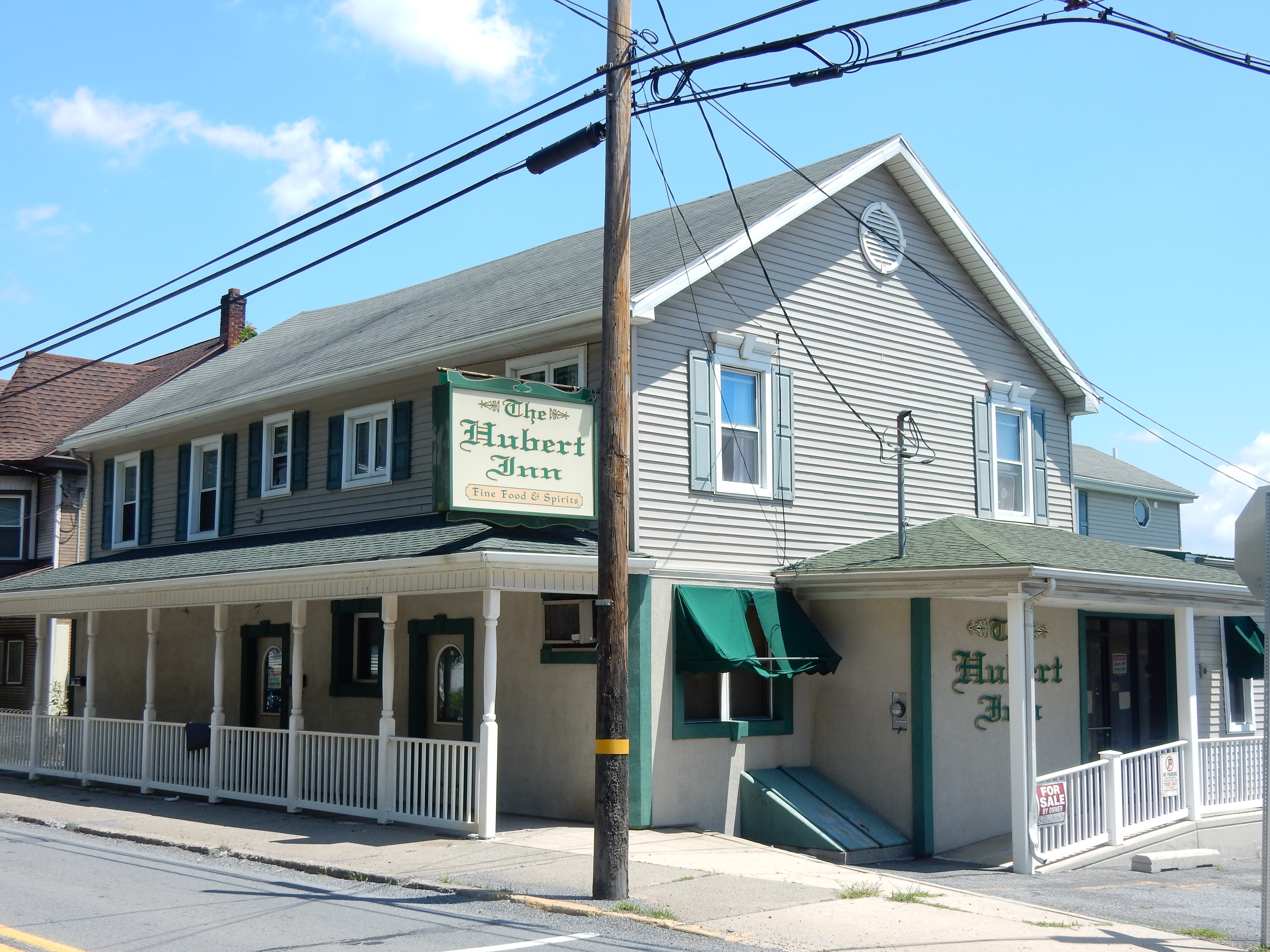
Hubert Inn on Pottsville St.

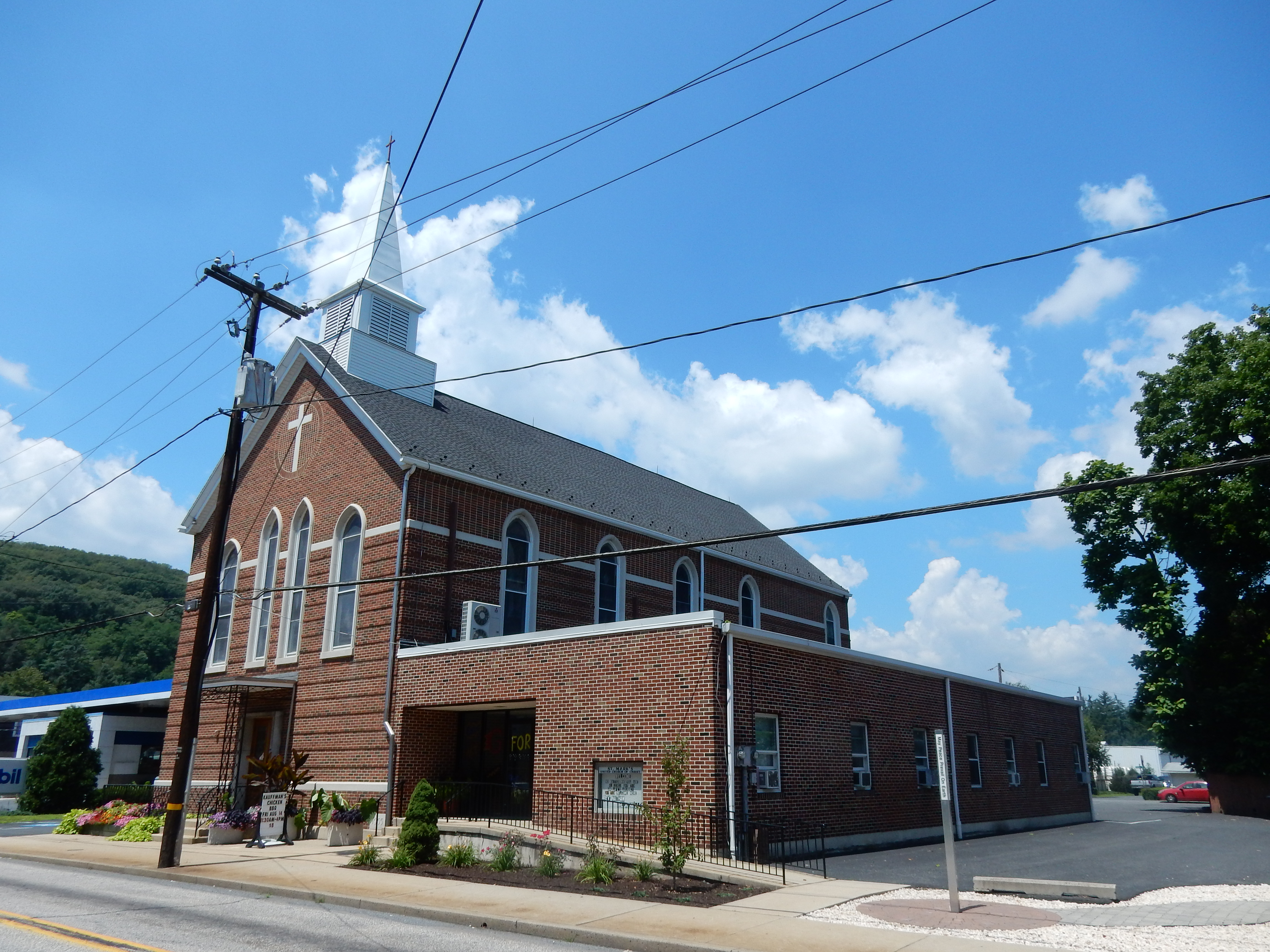
St. Mark's UCC.

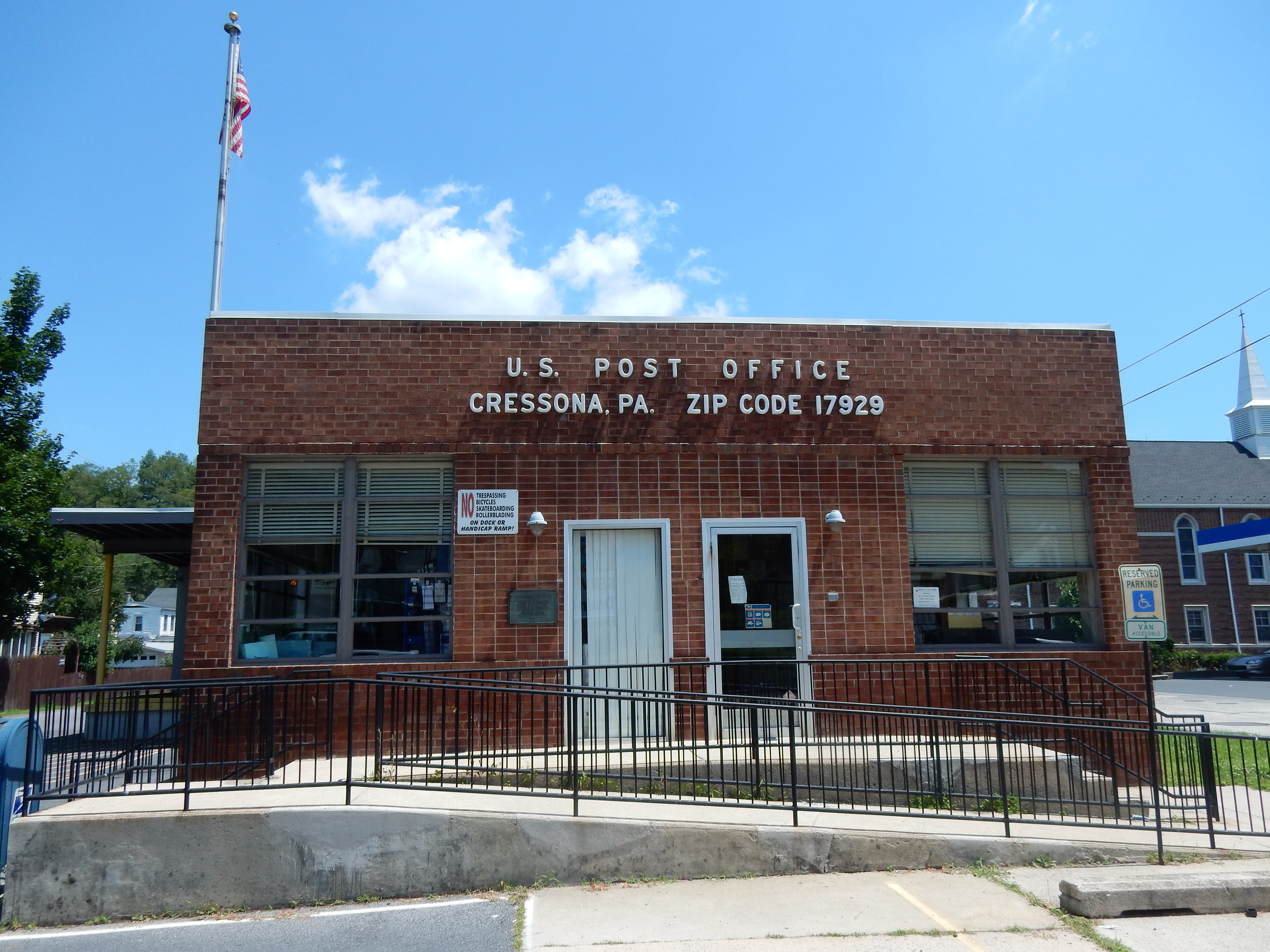
Cressona Post Office.

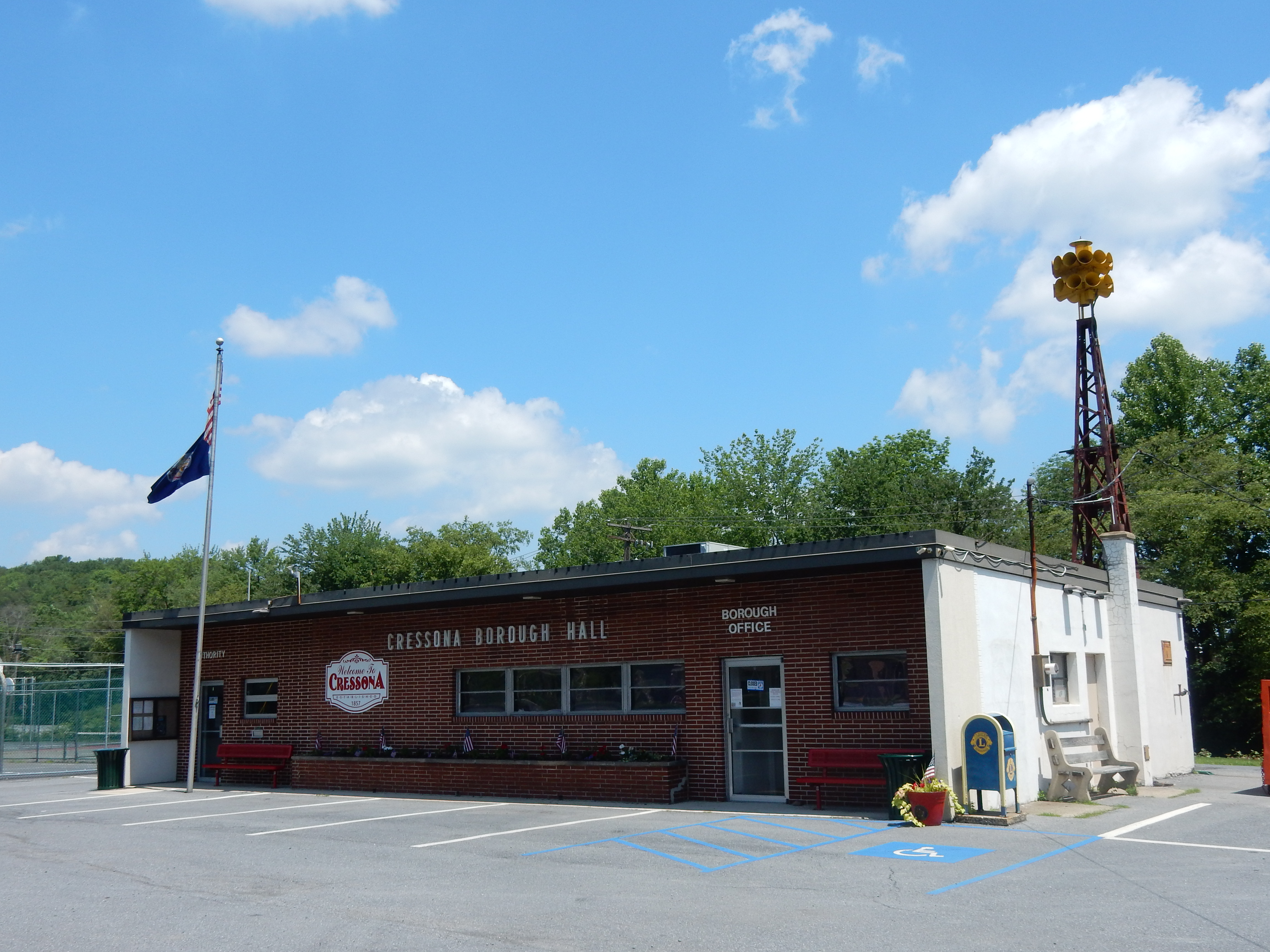
Borough Hall.

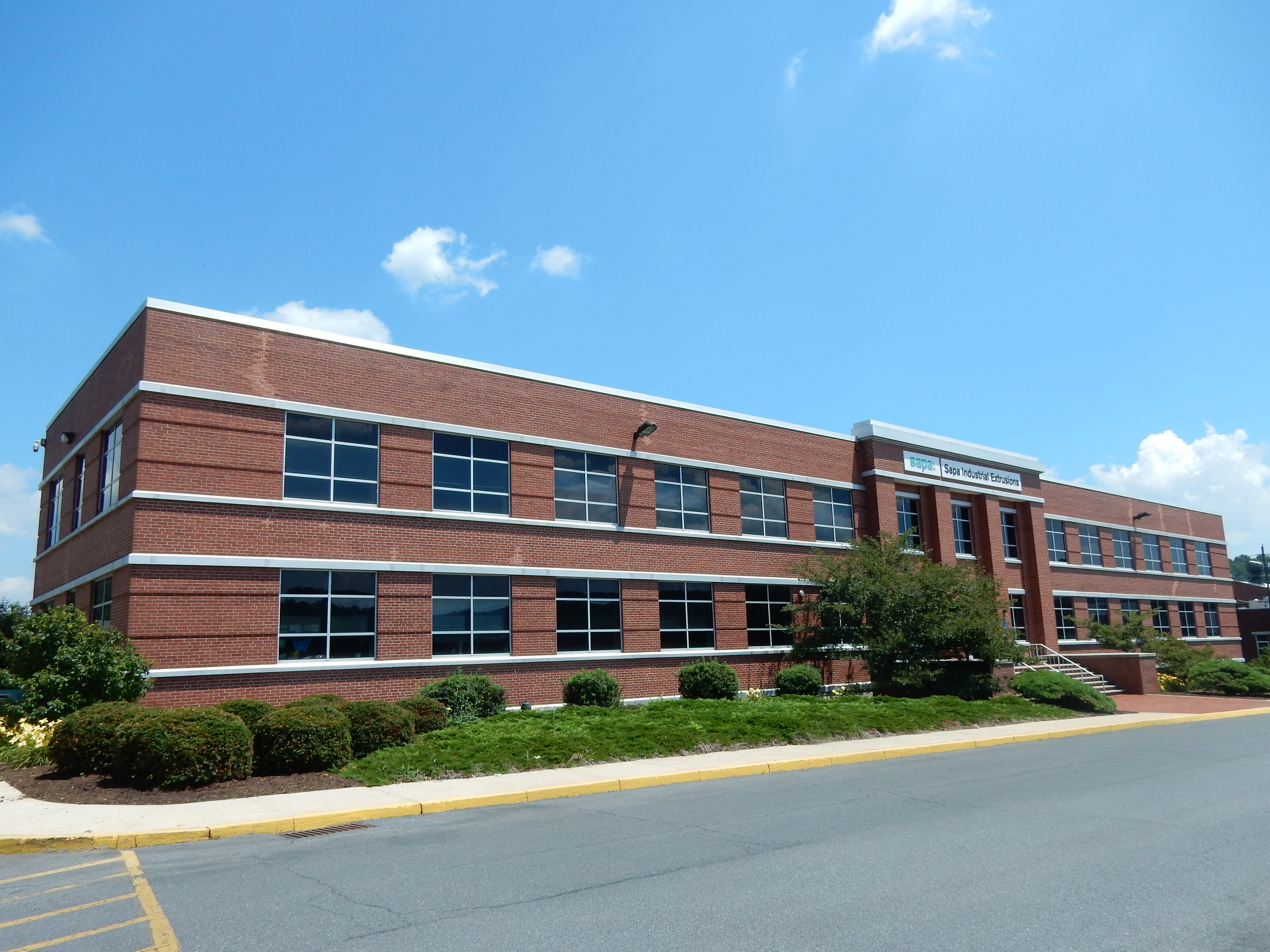
Sapa Extrusions facility in Cressona.
