= Lavelle, Pennsylvania =

Unincorporated community in Pennsylvania, US

Coordinates: 40°45′48″N 76°22′57″W

- Census-designated place
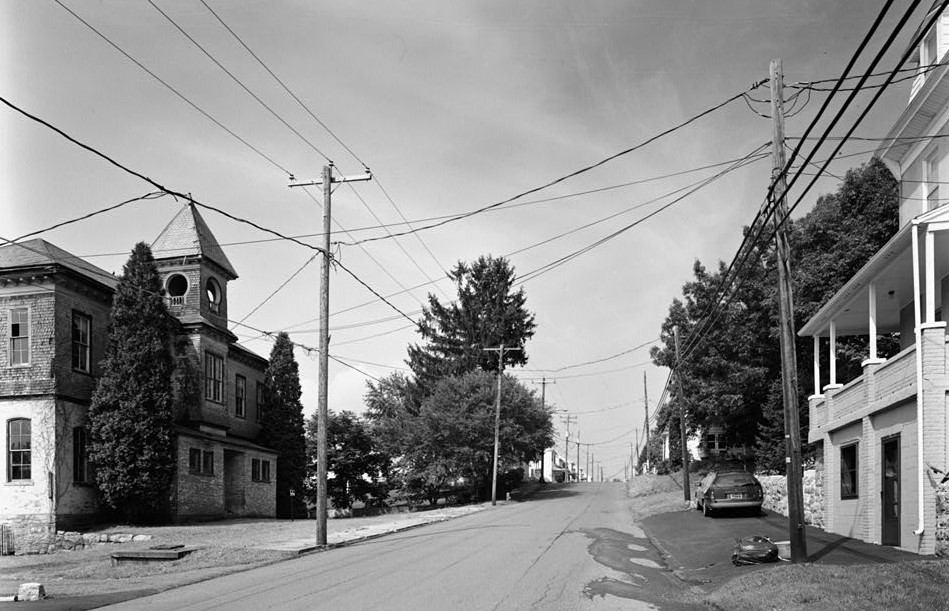
- Main Street, Lavelle, Pennsylvania
- Interactive map of Lavelle, Pennsylvania
- Country: United States
- State: Pennsylvania
- County: Schuylkill

Area
  - Total: 1.14 sq mi (2.94 km^{2})
  - Land: 1.14 sq mi (2.94 km^{2})
  - Water: 0 sq mi (0.00 km^{2})

Population (2020)
  - Total: 708
  - Density: 624.3/sq mi (241.04/km^{2})
- Time zone: UTC-5 (Eastern (EST))
  - Summer (DST): UTC-4 (EDT)
- FIPS code: 42-41904

Lavelle is a census-designated place that is located in Butler Township, Schuylkill County in the Commonwealth of Pennsylvania, in the United States. Situated on Pennsylvania Route 901, it was part of the Lavelle-Locustdale CDP for the 2000 census, before the communities were split into the two separate CDPs of Lavelle and Locustdale.

Originally named Salome, as a tribute to the wife of one of the town's pioneer settlers, the community was officially renamed as Lavelle sometime around 1880 in honor of Martin M. Lavelle, an Ashland, Pennsylvania attorney who had been a cavalryman during the American Civil War.

During the late nineteenth century, the community of Lavelle was described by area newspapers as a hamlet. By the late twentieth century, it was still small, referred to in its own public notices as the Village of Lavelle.

== History ==
During the early 1860s, a significant percentage of residents in Schuylkill County were engaged in mining. Among those operating collieries in 1862 were John Denison whose Keystone Mines employed more than two hundred men at its facility northeast of the area that would later become the village of Lavelle. During the early 1880s, the community that had grown up around that mine was known as Salome. It had been named after Salome (Hepler) Bolich, the wife of the Rev. Michael Bolich, a Baptist preacher who ministered to local residents. As the scattered resident population grew to become a hamlet, the eastern end of the community adopted the name of Rocktown while the western end continued to be known as Salome. Sometime around 1870, a powder mill was erected nearby and began producing black powder for use in the explosives used by miners.

Roughly a decade later, the hamlet was officially renamed as Lavelle, as a tribute to Martin M. Lavelle, an attorney in the neighboring town of Ashland who achieved local fame as a cavalryman with the Union Army during the American Civil War.

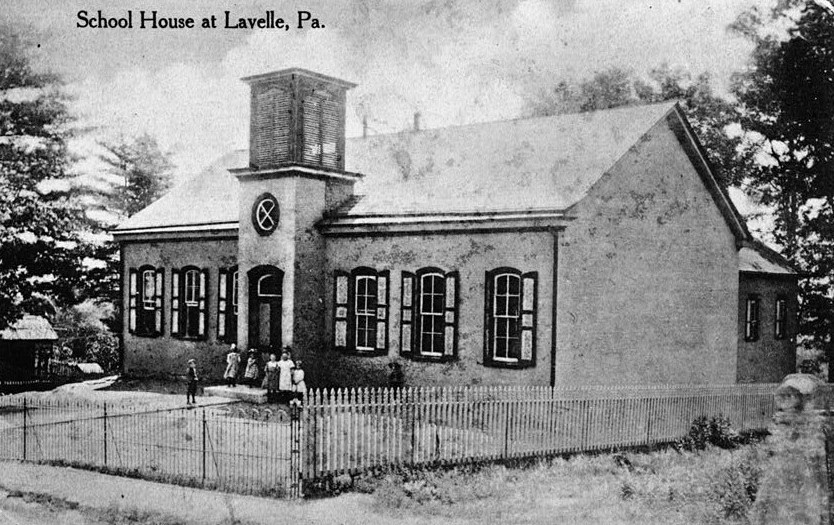
The Lavelle public school on Main Street in Lavelle, Pennsylvania, c. late 1800s-early 1900s

Shortly thereafter, Thomas Edward Enterline (1860-1928), known more commonly as T. E. Enterline, relocated to Lavelle in order to open the hamlet's first retail business. A general merchandise store, it quickly became a gathering place for the small, rural community as Enterline expanded the number and quantity of products he offered for sale and as Enterline took on added duties as the village's postmaster. The community's visibility was also increased with the organization of the Schuylkill County Fair, which was held in Lavelle from 1886 through 1895.

Around this same time, members of the Enterline family joined with other members of the town to donate land in order to plan and build a public school, which opened its doors in the mid-1890s.

Disaster struck in 1895, however, when a fire completely gutted the Enterline general store, as well as Enterline's family home. Although the mail from the postmaster's office was saved, a significant portion of Enterline's merchandise was destroyed. An explosion at the powder mill outside of Lavelle that same year destroyed a number of the mill's ten buildings.

With support from the community, Enterline was able to rebuild his store, and continued to serve the community well into the twentieth century.

=== 1900s ===
The village of Lavelle continued to grow after the turn of the century with the addition of the Eagle Hotel, which was operated by William H. Gotschall, who had relocated to Lavelle from his hometown of Sunbury in Northumberland County, Pennsylvania in 1901. The Citizens Cemetery Association of Lavelle, which had been incorporated on January 1, 1900, was granted a charter by the Commonwealth of Pennsylvania in December 1903 to operate the village's cemetery located on Main Street. In 1906, a second explosion occurred at the powder mill outside of Lavelle, prompting the mill's subsequent closure that year. In 1907, Enterline resigned as postmaster in order to devote more time to his business concerns, which now included a growing interest in real estate purchase and sales.

During the summer of 1908, Lavelle residents John Hartranft Snyder (1873-1944) and Hiram Oskar Lenker (1871-1950) collaborated on the planning, organization, launch, and marketing of a new communications business, the Lavelle Telegraph and Telephone Company (also known as the Lavelle Telephone and Telegraph Company), which was chartered and then incorporated during the fall of 1908. Lenker served as the treasurer and Snyder as secretary of the corporation's board of directors, which oversaw the spending of the company's $5,000 in operating capital. The first phone line installed by the company provided service between Ashland, Lavelle and other communities in Schuylkill County, and was quickly expanded to include towns and villages in Columbia and Northumberland counties. Snyder and his wife, Minnie (Strohecker) Snyder (1872-1952), also owned and operated a dry goods store from the ground floor level of their home on Main Street.

Residential and business fires continued to be a problem for the community well into the new century. On March 16, 1911, several homes on Main Street in Lavelle were completely destroyed or severely damaged when a vandal threw a stone through a window of the home of John Hartranft Snyder and his family, striking and toppling a lamp, which then exploded and sparked a fire. Fanned by high winds, the flames quickly spread to neighboring homes, many of which were made of wood, and then also became a threat to the town's small business district. The situation was so dire because the town still did not own a fire truck and was unable to obtain help from the fire departments in the neighboring communities of Mount Carmel and Centralia, which were having equipment problems at the time. Residents of Lavelle were eventually able to halt the fire's advance and bring it under control by forming a bucket brigade.

At the time of his death in 1928, Lavelle general store owner T. E. Enterline was described by area newspapers as the "pioneer businessman of Lavelle." Following his death, his widow, Estella (Strohecker) Enterline (1870-1956), and their son, Bright Samuel Enterline (1895-1964), continued to own and operate the store, with Bright assuming full control following Stella's death in 1956. By the early 1960s, the store's operations also included a soda fountain/restaurant counter, which served as a gathering spot for area residents. Enterline continued to operate the store until his death in 1964.

=== Mid-1900s ===
During the early 1930s, Cardinal Dennis Joseph Dougherty, a native of Girardville, Pennsylvania who was the Archbishop of Philadelphia, gave his approval for the creation of a new church to serve the more than forty Catholic families who resided in Lavelle. The new congregation was established when the first mass was held at the home of George Quinton Sr. in Krapf's Hall, an apartment building. A permanent structure was then erected in 1935 at a cost of $4,000 on a tract of pasture land that had been owned by dairy farmers, Clement and Elizabeth Scheuren, and was donated to the church that year. The church was then built and dedicated as St. Elizabeth Roman Catholic Church in honor of the Scheurens' patron saint.

On December 9, 1936, members of the community formed the Lavelle Volunteer Fire Company. Within three months, it had one hundred and twenty-six volunteer members. Peter E. Eister, a longtime advocate for improving the village's fire protection capabilities, was one of the company's organizers, and served as its first president. At the company's March 1997 meeting, members discussed ways to improve the town's fire protection, including the feasibility of developing a formal proposal to secure Works Progress Administration (WPA) funding to install water mains throughout the community. Civic leaders estimated that the cost of installing one eight-inch, 5000-foot connector to the Butler Water Company's ten-inch line at the old powder mill road, would cost property owners $7,687.01. Reassessment of local property owners' fire insurance rates by the fire insurance underwriters' bureau was also discussed.

By the 1940s, the Lavelle Telegraph and Telephone Company was linked to the Bell Telephone Company's Ashland exchange.

During the week of October 3, 1954, St. Peter's Lutheran Church celebrated its fiftieth anniversary with a series of special themed services, which began at 7:30 p.m. each evening. Tuesday, October 5 was Anniversary Night with a sermon delivered by the church's former longtime pastor, the Rev. Charles E. Rudy. Thursday, October 7 was Music Night, and featured an organ recital by Alfred Seward of Reading, Pennsylvania. The church's founding and early years were described by area newspapers as follows:

"In 1891 Rev. G. W. Fritsch took charge of Zion's Church and he organized a small congregation in Huntersville (now Lavelle) by holding services first in an old church building in Taylorsville, later in the public school building at Huntersville, and then in a building owned by the Evangelical Congregational Association at Lavelle, with services being conducted there until a church building could be erected.

In October, 1902, the late Rev. Paul E. Bergeman, became pastor of the Ashland church and supply pastor at Lavelle.

During 1904 a movement began to build a church. The county court granted a charter.... A plot of ground was purchased from the late Mrs. John Lexo. The corner stone was placed Sunday, May 1, 1904, and dedication service was held on Oct. 2, same year, with the late Rev. W. E. Fisher, delivering the sermon.... The cost of the building was about $2,500.

Following completion of the church, the Sunday School, Ladies Aid and Young People's societies were organized and on Oct. 14, the mortgage was burned with services. During that year the English language was introduced to alternate each week with the German language. About 1915 the German language was omitted ... and only English was preached."

Still concerned about village residents' ability to protect themselves from fire, because there still was "no water system in the community" by late 1957, members of the Lavelle Volunteer Fire Company authorized the purchase of a new fire truck to enhance the company's capabilities. The new F.W.D. Model Eight vehicle manufactured by Front Wheel Auto, which had a 750-gallon water tank and combination pump engine, and was also capable of carrying fire-fighting chemicals, cost $15,200. It became the company's primary firefighting vehicle while the fire truck purchased by the organization in 1945 became the company's auxiliary vehicle.

On January 12, 1958, members of Lavelle's AMVETS chapter, the Hubler-Wolfgang Post 156 which was chartered in 1951, dedicated the organization's new building on East Strembeck Street.

In 1966, Helen Edling was appointed as the U.S. Postmaster for Lavelle. Like Enterline and other postmasters before her, she operated the village's post office out of her personal residence.

By 1969, water service was being provided to village residents and businesses by the Butler Township Water Company. On November 4, 1969, Citizens' National Bank opened a new branch in Lavelle.

Also that same year, construction was completed on a new road linking Lavelle to Beury's Grove, which was part of a larger construction project to enable residents from the communities of Ashland, Centralia, Lavelle, Locust Dale, and Mount Carmel to more easily reach Pennsylvania's Interstate 81.

=== Late 1900s ===
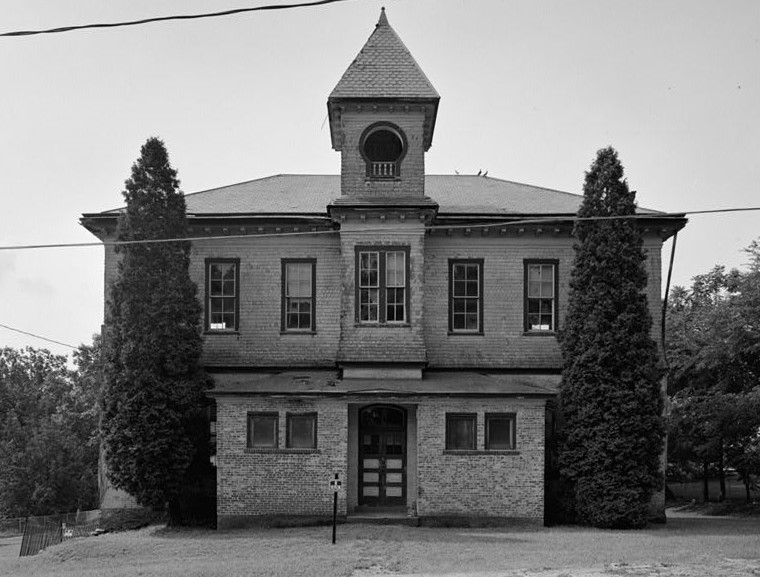
Historic American Buildings Survey photo of the Lavelle Elementary School after it was abandoned during the 1950s

In 1983, leaders of Christ United Lutheran Church, a collaboration of the four Lutheran churches located in Girardville, Gordon, Kimmels, Lavelle, secured grant funding from the Lutheran Church of America to establish The Community Youth Center in Lavelle in order to offer area children aged five to eighteen a safe place to socialize. The project, which was approved by the Butler Township Board of Supervisors, was housed in the rear of the former Lavelle Elementary School building on Main Street. Volunteers installed electric heating, a drop ceiling, room dividers, and kitchen cupboards, and members of the community donated a dutch oven, refrigerator, stove, soda cooler, as well as a ping pong table, pool table, and games.

Following four months of construction during the summer and fall of 1986, the United States Postal Service opened its first post office building in Lavelle. Staffed by longtime postmaster Helen Edling and postal clerk Dorothy M. Shadle, who had been operating the post office out of Edling's personal residence since 1966, the new building was erected on Main Street on the site of the former home of Josephine Welker (1904-1998), which had been razed to allow for construction of the post office. One of the town's earliest structures, Welker's home was partly made of logs and still had no indoor plumbing; she and her ten siblings were all born there.

On November 28, 1990, the two-story Lavelle Elementary School building, which had been largely vacant since the late 1950s, was razed due to health and safety concerns. Community officials from Butler Township obtained a community affairs block grant from the state to cover the $37,462 cost of the demolition.

=== 2000s ===
In June 2000, a new and improved youth center was opened in Lavelle. Located in a former church building at 2977 Fairgrounds Road, the Island Youth Center was launched and sponsored by the Lavelle Church of the Nazarene, and offered a safe space for teens to socialize, play pool and video games, listen to music, play basketball, kickball and other sports. A snack bar was also available, as was a van driven by volunteers, who drove youths who lacked transportation to and from the center.

On Wednesday evening, December 28, 2005, congregants of the St. Elizabeth Roman Catholic Church celebrated their chapel's final mass. The church was closed due to declining membership and financial concerns.

== Demographics ==
Historical population
Census	Pop.	Note	%±
2020	708		—
U.S. Decennial Census

Population rates fluctuated in Lavelle during the 1940s as birth and death rates increased and decreased. According to the Pottsville Republican, the annual death rates were: forty-one in 1941, twelve each in 1942 and 1943, six in 1944, ten each in 1945 and 1946, and eight in 1947. Eighteen Additionally:

"The birth rate during 1943 in the Lavelle area increased with 66 births listed compared to 46 in 1946. There were 34 boys to 32 girls born. One baby died at birth."

As of the 2010 census the population was 742 residents. By the time that the 2020 federal census was taken, the town's population had declined to 708.

== Education ==
The school district is North Schuylkill School District.
