= Branch Township, Pennsylvania =

Township in Pennsylvania, US

Coordinates: 40°40′00″N 76°14′29″W

- Township
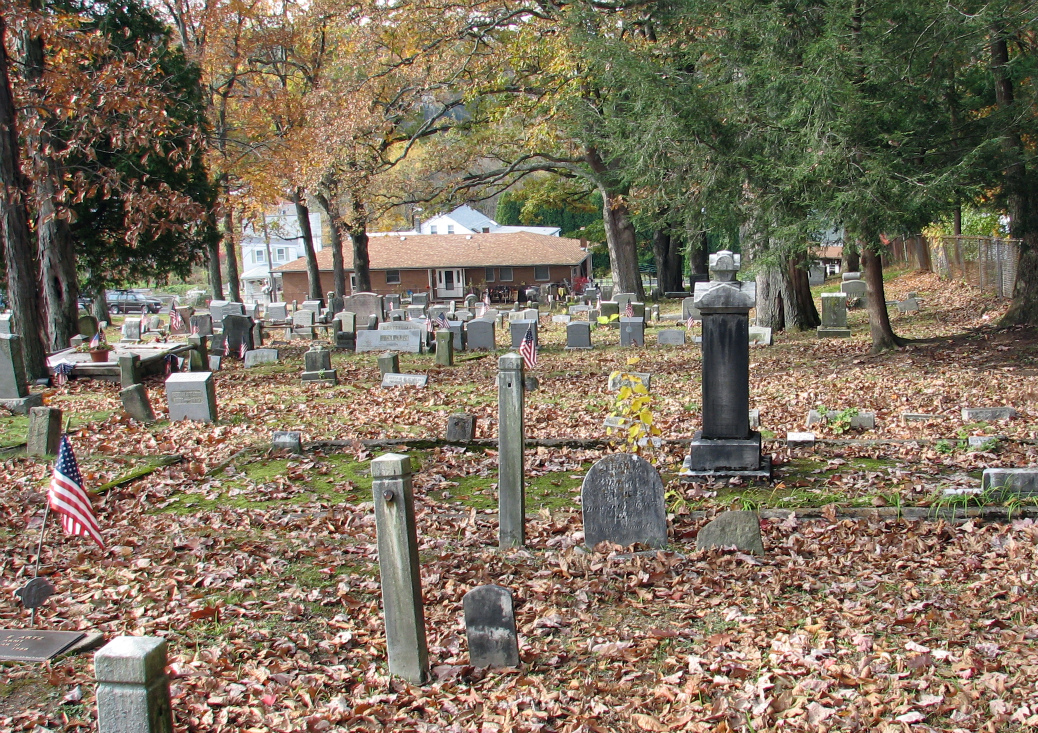
- Cemetery in Llewellyn

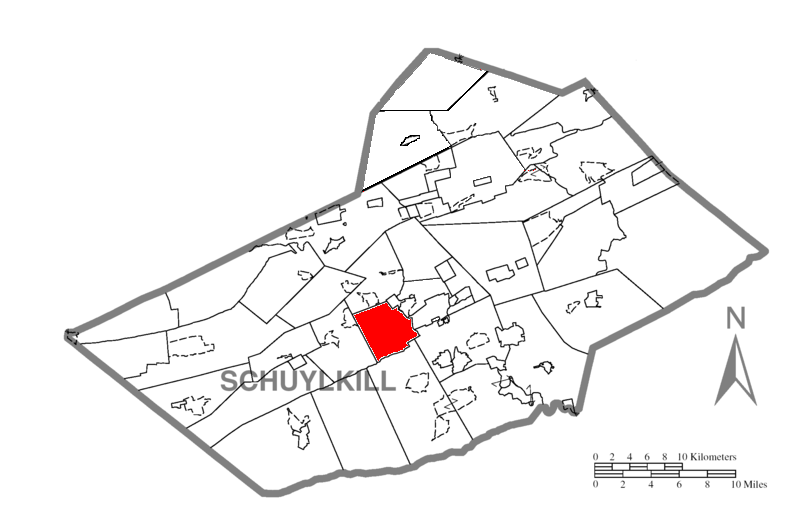
- Location of Branch Township in Schuylkill County, Pennsylvania

- Location of Schuylkill County in Pennsylvania
- Country: United States
- State: Pennsylvania
- County: Schuylkill
- Settled: 1750
- Incorporated: 1838

Government
  - Type: Board of Supervisors
  - Elected Supervisors: Supervisor David Schultz (2020-2026) Supervisor Laine Gahres (2016-2022) Supervisor Robert Houser (2018-2024)

Area
  - Total: 11.54 sq mi (29.90 km^{2})
  - Land: 11.47 sq mi (29.70 km^{2})
  - Water: 0.077 sq mi (0.20 km^{2})

Population (2020)
  - Total: 1,748 ▼
  - Estimate (2023): 1,760
  - Density: 155/sq mi (59.8/km^{2})
- Time zone: UTC-5 (Eastern (EST))
  - Summer (DST): UTC-4 (EDT)
- FIPS code: 42-107-08200
- Website: branchtwp.com

Branch Township is a township in Schuylkill County, Pennsylvania, United States. Formed in 1838 from part of Norwegian Township, it is named for the west branch of the Schuylkill River, which flows through it.

== Geography ==
According to the U.S. Census Bureau, the township has a total area of 11.8 square miles (31 km^{2}), 11.7 square miles (30 km^{2}) of which is land and 0.1 square miles (0.26 km^{2}) (0.60%) of which is water.

== Demographics ==
Historical population
Census	Pop.	Note	%±
2010	1,840		—
2020	1,748		−5.0%
2023 (est.)	1,760		0.7%
U.S. Decennial Census

At the 2000 census there were 1,871 people, 737 households, and 557 families living in the township. The population density was 160.2 inhabitants per square mile (61.9/km^{2}). There were 789 housing units at an average density of 67.6 per square mile (26.1/km^{2}). The racial makeup of the township was 99.25% White, 0.05% African American, 0.53% Asian, 0.05% from other races, and 0.11% from two or more races. Hispanic or Latino of any race were 0.53%.

Of the 737 households 29.0% had children under the age of 18 living with them, 64.3% were married couples living together, 7.3% had a female householder with no husband present, and 24.4% were non-families. 22.4% of households were one person and 13.8% were one person aged 65 or older. The average household size was 2.54 and the average family size was 2.97.

The age distribution was 20.3% under the age of 18, 6.9% from 18 to 24, 23.4% from 25 to 44, 30.6% from 45 to 64, and 18.8% 65 or older. The median age was 45 years. For every 100 females there were 100.3 males. For every 100 females age 18 and over, there were 96.4 males.

The median household income was $38,125 and the median family income was $46,324. Males had a median income of $32,348 versus $24,637 for females. The per capita income for the township was $18,670. About 6.1% of families and 6.6% of the population were below the poverty line, including 3.5% of those under age 18 and 13.9% of those age 65 or over.
