= Llewellyn, Pennsylvania =

Unincorporated community in Pennsylvania, US

Llewellyn
- Unincorporated community
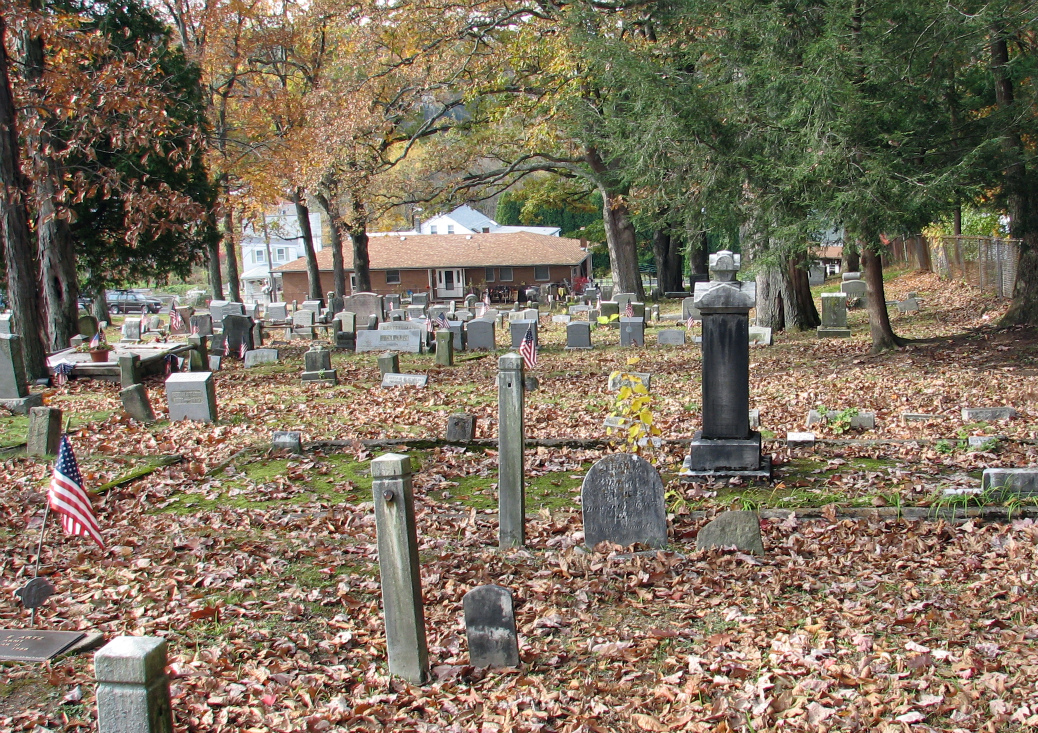
- Cemetery in Llewellyn

- Location within the U.S. state of Pennsylvania Llewellyn (the United States)
- Coordinates: 40°40′22″N 76°16′45″W
- Country: United States
- State: Pennsylvania
- County: Schuylkill
- Time zone: UTC-5 (Eastern (EST))
  - Summer (DST): UTC-4 (EDT)
- ZIP codes: 17944
- GNIS feature ID: 1179732

Llewellyn is an unincorporated community in Branch Township, Schuylkill County, Pennsylvania, United States. The community is located approximately 1.5 miles southwest of Minersville, along the West Branch of the Schuylkill River.

== Demographics ==
Historical population
Census	Pop.	Note	%±

The United States Census Bureau defined Llewellyn as a census designated place (CDP) in 2023.
