= Buck Run, Pennsylvania =

Unincorporated community in Pennsylvania, US

Buck Run
- Census-designated place
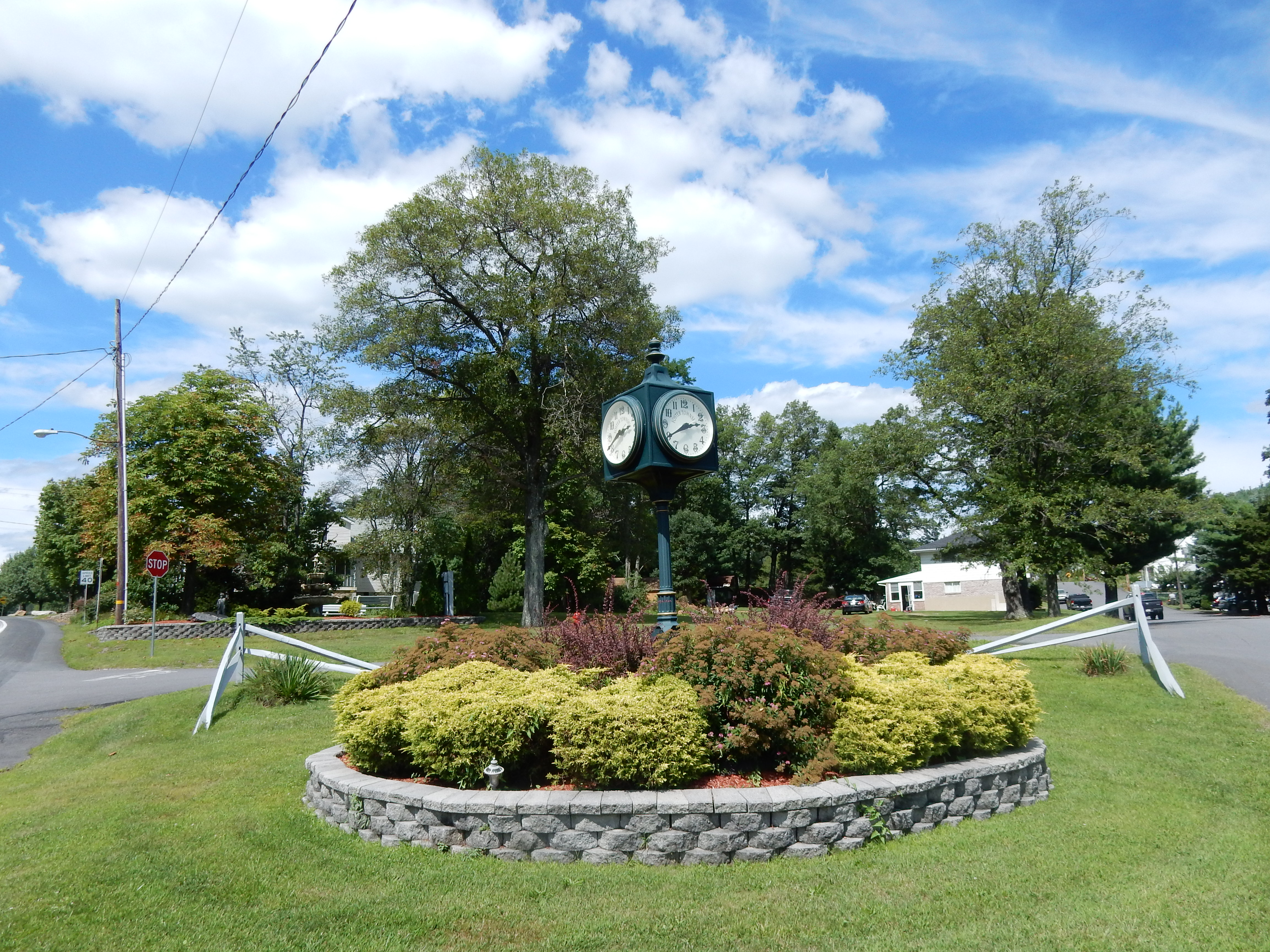
- Entrance to Buck Run.

- Location within the U.S. state of Pennsylvania Buck Run (the United States)
- Coordinates: 40°42′29″N 76°19′27″W
- Country: United States
- State: Pennsylvania
- County: Schuylkill

Area
  - Total: 0.50 sq mi (1.30 km^{2})
  - Land: 0.50 sq mi (1.30 km^{2})
  - Water: 0 sq mi (0.00 km^{2})

Population (2020)
  - Total: 180
  - Density: 359.2/sq mi (138.69/km^{2})
- Time zone: UTC-5 (Eastern (EST))
  - Summer (DST): UTC-4 (EDT)
- FIPS code: 42-09896

Buck Run is a census-designated place (CDP) in Foster Township, Schuylkill County, Pennsylvania, United States. The population was 176 at the 2010 census.

== Geography ==
Buck Run is located at 40°42′29″N 76°19′27″W (40.707989, -76.324205).

According to the United States Census Bureau, the CDP has a total area of 0.6 square miles (1.6 km^{2}), all land.

== Demographics ==
Historical population
Census	Pop.	Note	%±
2020	180		—
U.S. Decennial Census

At the 2000 census there were 203 people, 72 households, and 54 families living in the CDP. The population density was 337.1 inhabitants per square mile (130.2/km^{2}). There were 78 housing units at an average density of 129.5 per square mile (50.0/km^{2}). The racial makeup of the CDP was 98.03% White, and 1.97% from two or more races. Of the 72 households 36.1% had children under the age of 18 living with them, 58.3% were married couples living together, 9.7% had a female householder with no husband present, and 25.0% were non-families. 23.6% of households were one person and 12.5% were one person aged 65 or older. The average household size was 2.82 and the average family size was 3.24.

The age distribution was 27.1% under the age of 18, 6.9% from 18 to 24, 29.1% from 25 to 44, 18.2% from 45 to 64, and 18.7% 65 or older. The median age was 38 years. For every 100 females, there were 109.3 males. For every 100 females age 18 and over, there were 105.6 males.

The median household income was $32,292 and the median family income was $29,375. Males had a median income of $35,417 versus $22,143 for females. The per capita income for the CDP was $11,397. About 18.0% of families and 18.1% of the population were below the poverty line, including 27.8% of those under the age of eighteen and none of those sixty five or over.

== Education ==
The school district is Minersville Area School District.

== Gallery ==
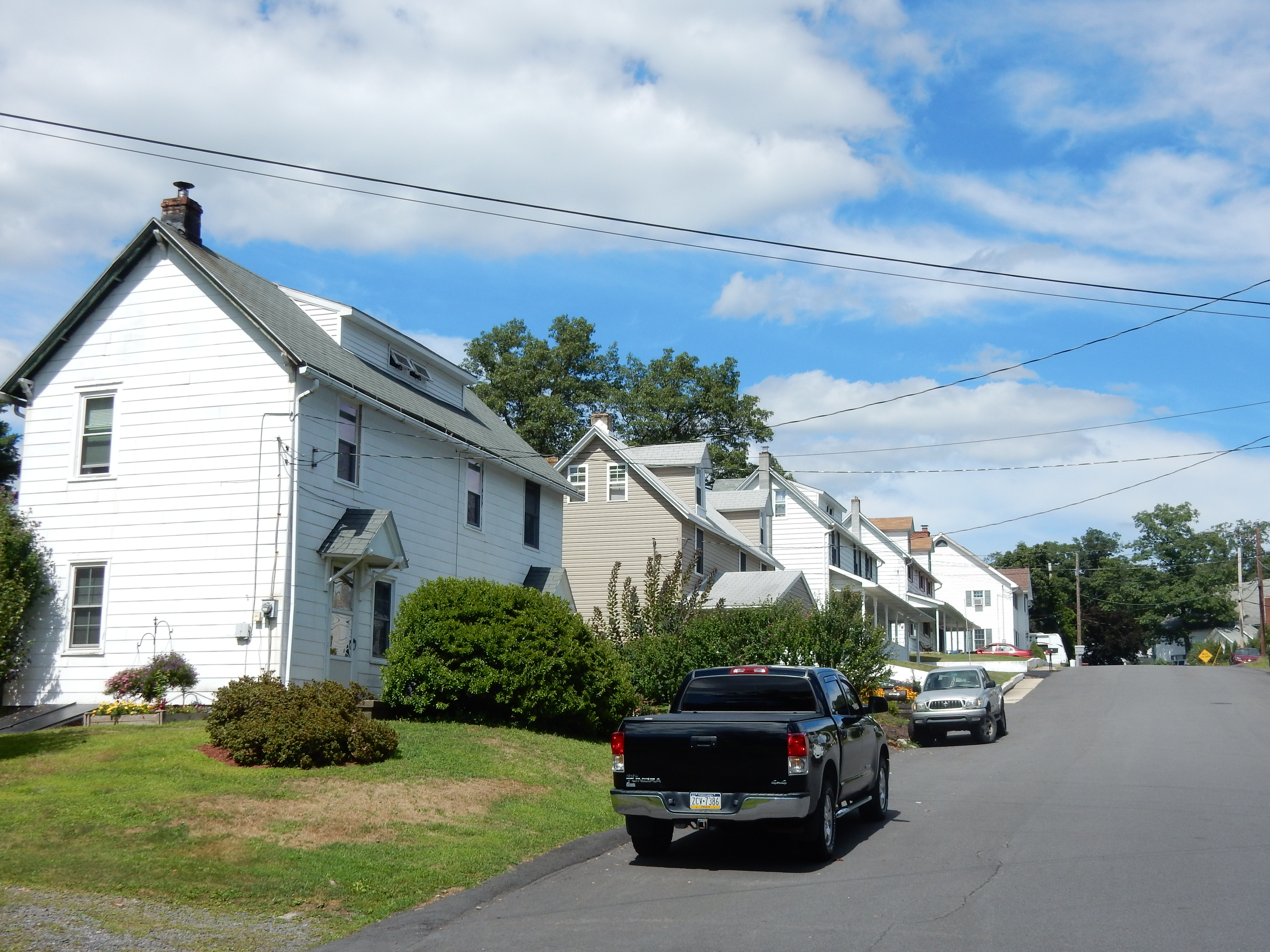
Upper Beechwood Ave.

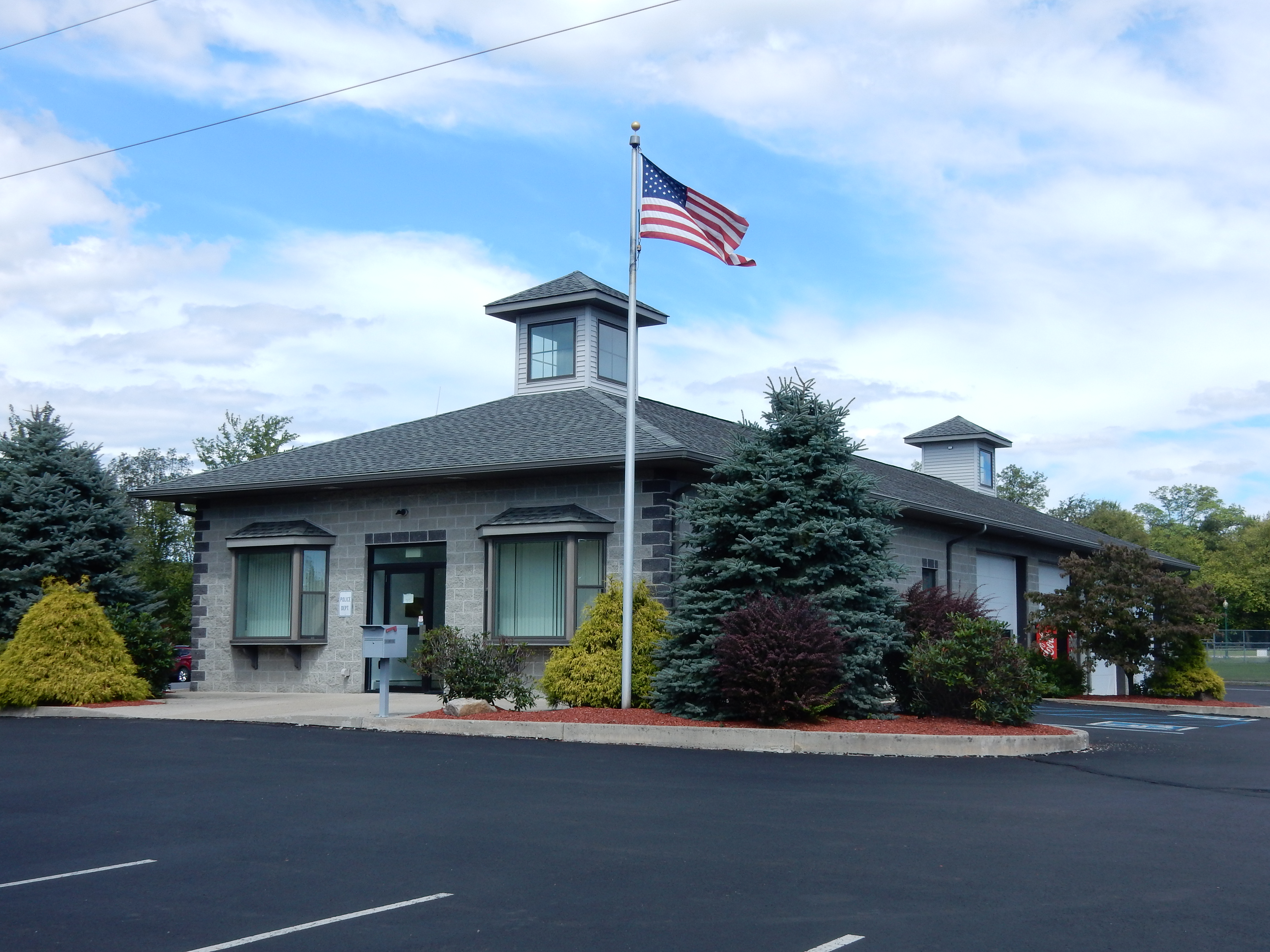
Foster Township Municipal Bldg.

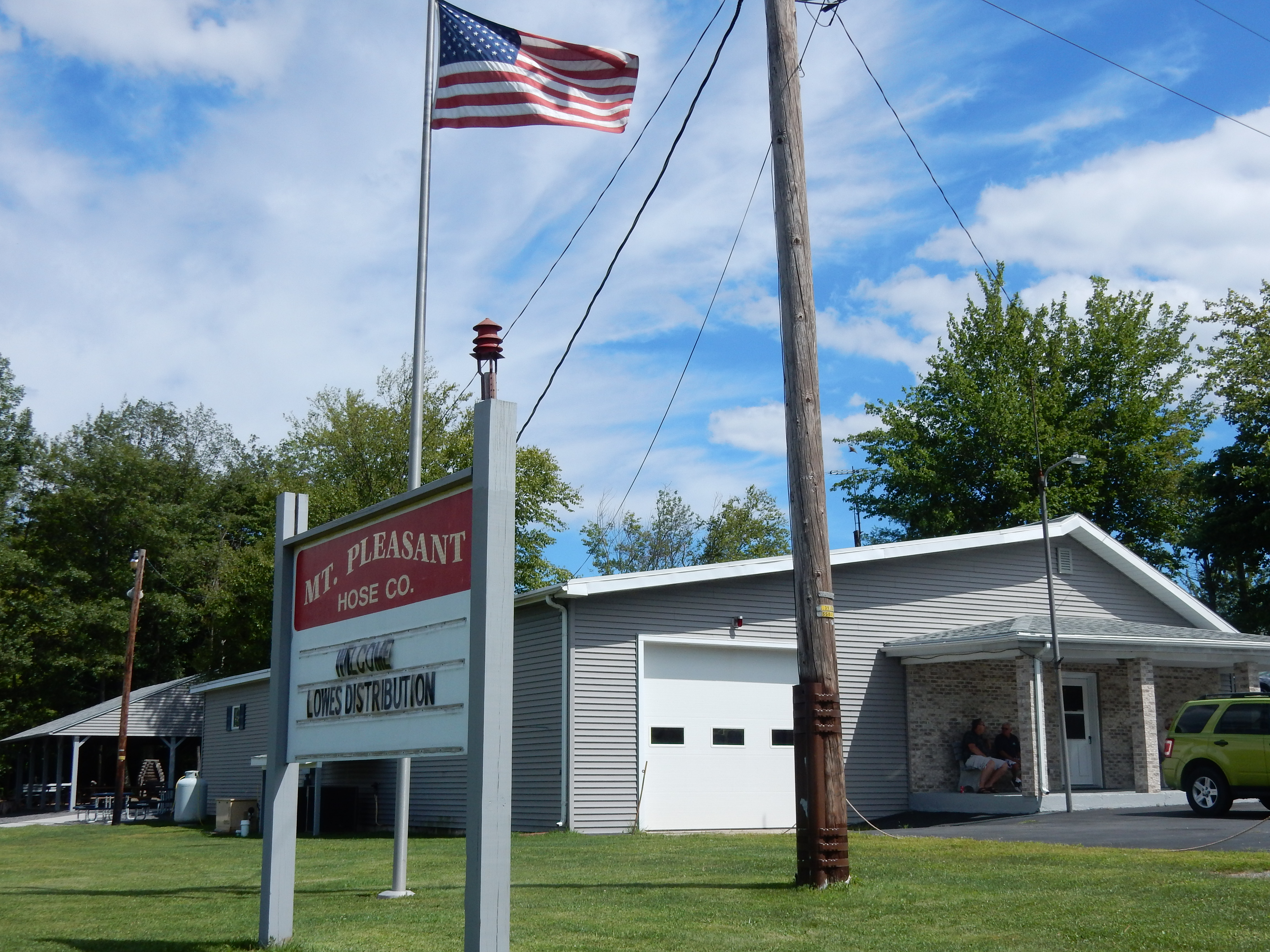
Mt. Pleasant Hose Co. of Foster Township.

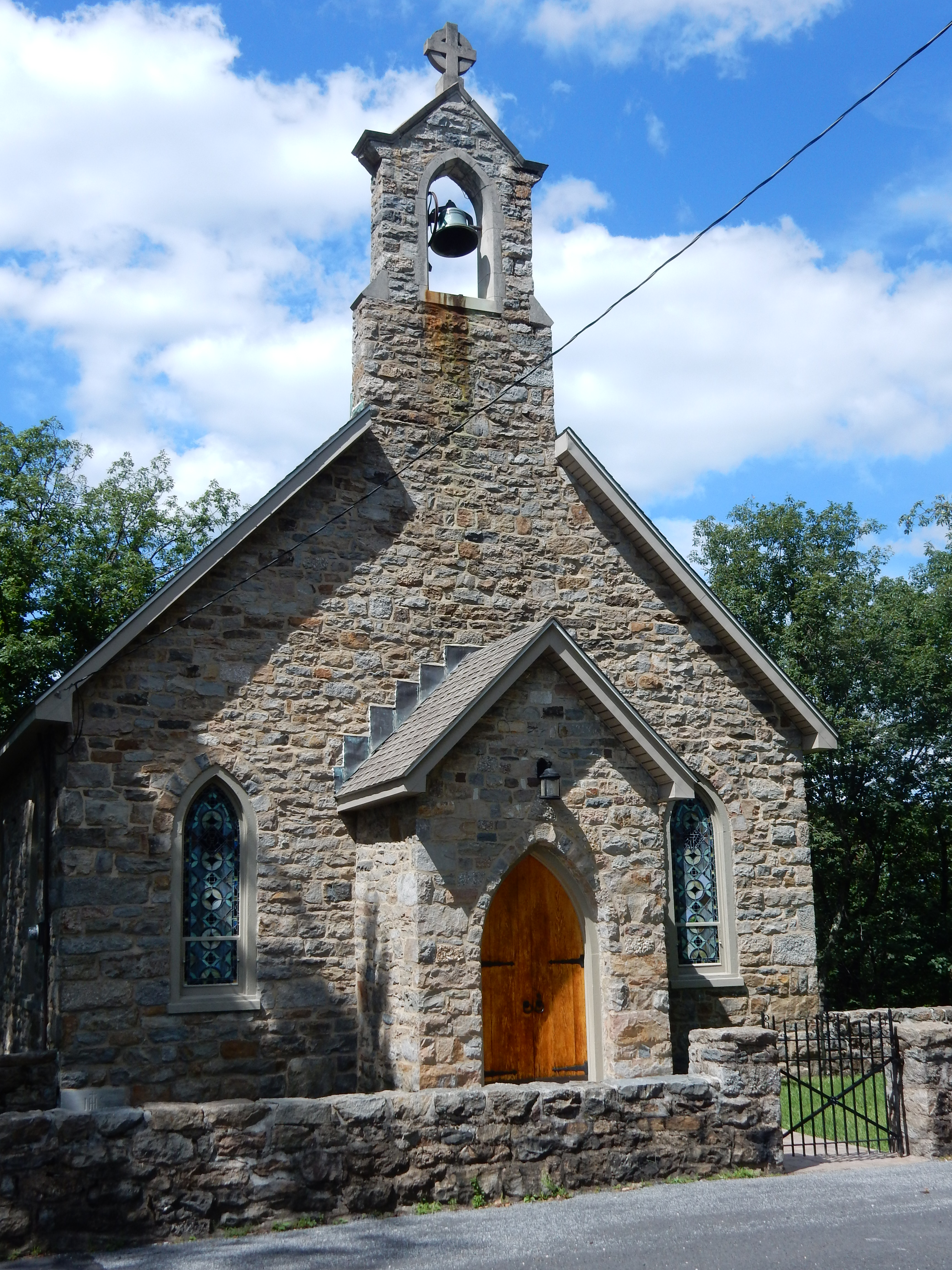
Trinity Chapel in Buck Run.
