= Foster Township, Schuylkill County, Pennsylvania =

Township in Pennsylvania, US

Coordinates: 40°41′00″N 76°22′59″W

- Township
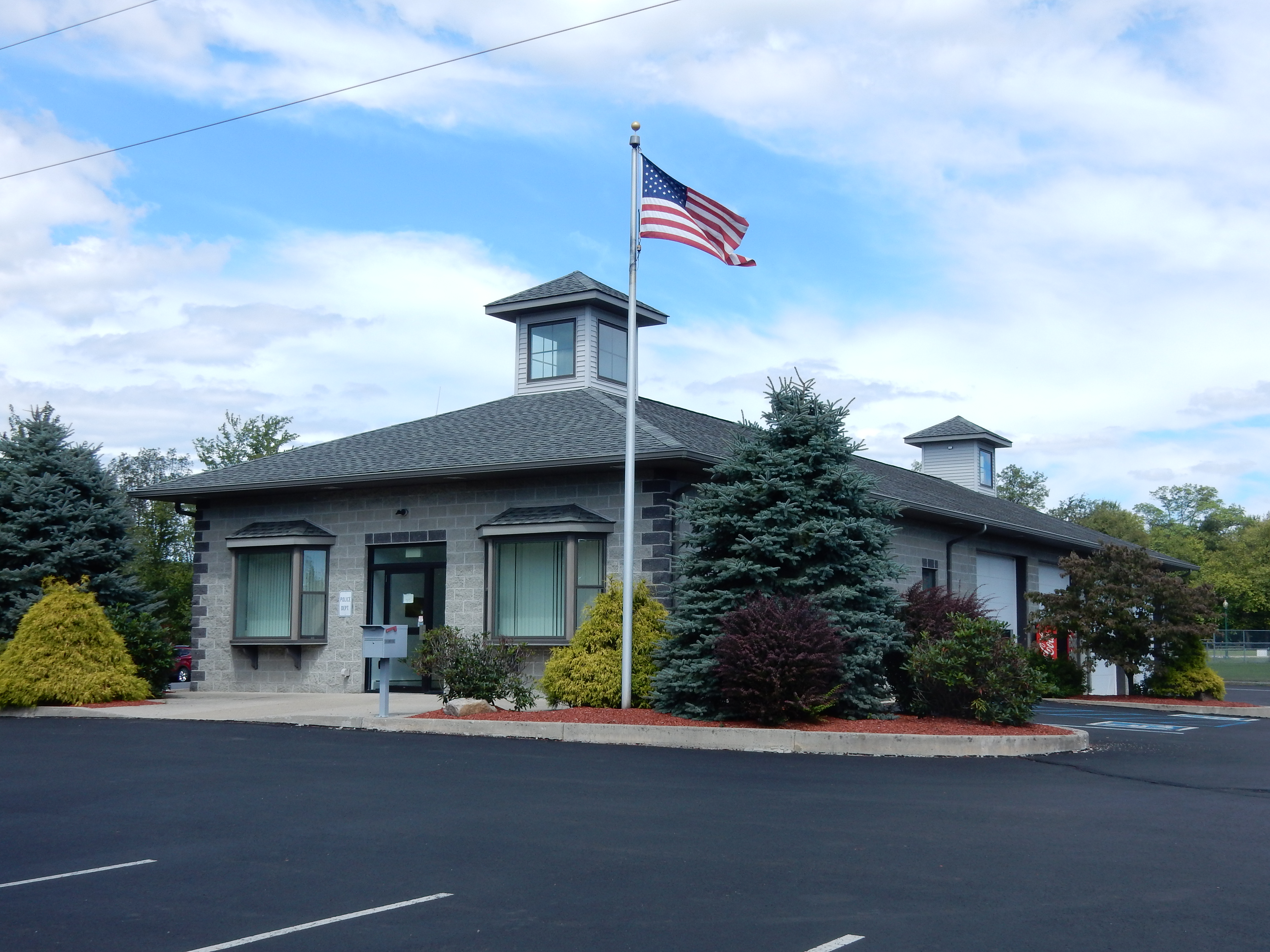
- Foster Township Municipal Bldg.

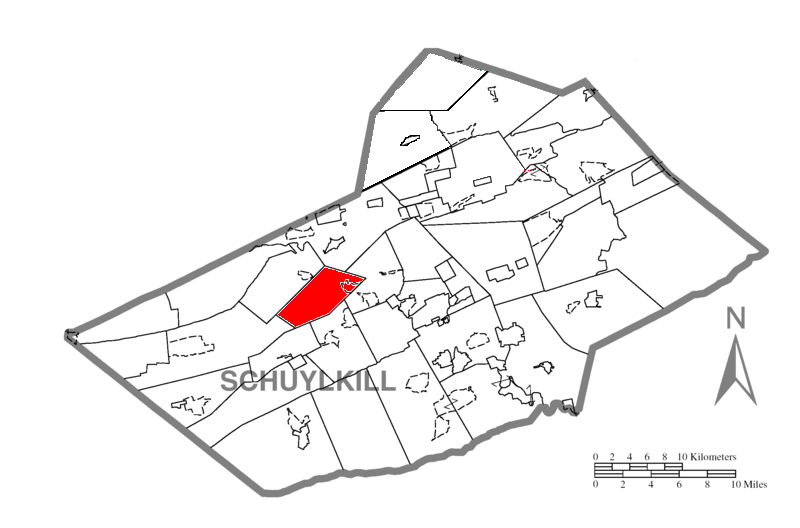
- Location of Foster Township in Schuylkill County, Pennsylvania

- Location of Schuylkill County in Pennsylvania
- Country: United States
- State: Pennsylvania
- County: Schuylkill
- Incorporated: 1855

Area
  - Total: 13.18 sq mi (34.13 km^{2})
  - Land: 13.15 sq mi (34.05 km^{2})
  - Water: 0.031 sq mi (0.08 km^{2})

Population (2020)
  - Total: 242 ▼
  - Estimate (2023): 245
  - Density: 19.2/sq mi (7.43/km^{2})
- Time zone: UTC-5 (Eastern (EST))
  - Summer (DST): UTC-4 (EDT)
- FIPS code: 42-107-26944
- Website: https://fostertwp.org/

Foster Township is a township in Schuylkill County, Pennsylvania, United States. The population was 242 at the 2020 census.

== Geography ==
According to the U.S. Census Bureau, the township has a total area of 13.2 square miles (34 km^{2}), 13.1 square miles (34 km^{2}) of which is land and 0.04 square miles (0.10 km^{2}) (0.30%) of which is water. It contains the census-designated place of Buck Run.

== Demographics ==
Historical population
Census	Pop.	Note	%±
2010	251		—
2020	242		−3.6%
2023 (est.)	245		1.2%
U.S. Decennial Census

At the 2000 census there were 1,124 people, 105 households, and 72 families living in the township. The population density was 85.5 inhabitants per square mile (33.0/km^{2}). There were 115 housing units at an average density of 8.7/sq mi (3.4/km^{2}). The racial makeup of the township was 53.20% White, 43.24% African American, 0.27% Native American, 1.96% Asian, 0.62% from other races, and 0.71% from two or more races. Hispanic or Latino of any race were 17.70%.

Of the 105 households 28.6% had children under the age of 18 living with them, 54.3% were married couples living together, 7.6% had a female householder with no husband present, and 30.5% were non-families. 28.6% of households were one person and 13.3% were one person aged 65 or older. The average household size was 2.55 and the average family size was 3.08.

The age distribution was 5.6% under the age of 18, 8.3% from 18 to 24, 61.0% from 25 to 44, 18.6% from 45 to 64, and 6.5% 65 or older. The median age was 36 years. For every 100 females, there were 778.1 males. For every 100 females age 18 and over, there were 971.7 males.

The median household income was $31,042 and the median family income was $29,688. Males had a median income of $15,180 versus $21,607 for females. The per capita income for the township was $11,538. About 16.0% of families and 15.9% of the population were below the poverty line, including 24.1% of those under age 18 and 6.3% of those age 65 or over.

== Gallery ==
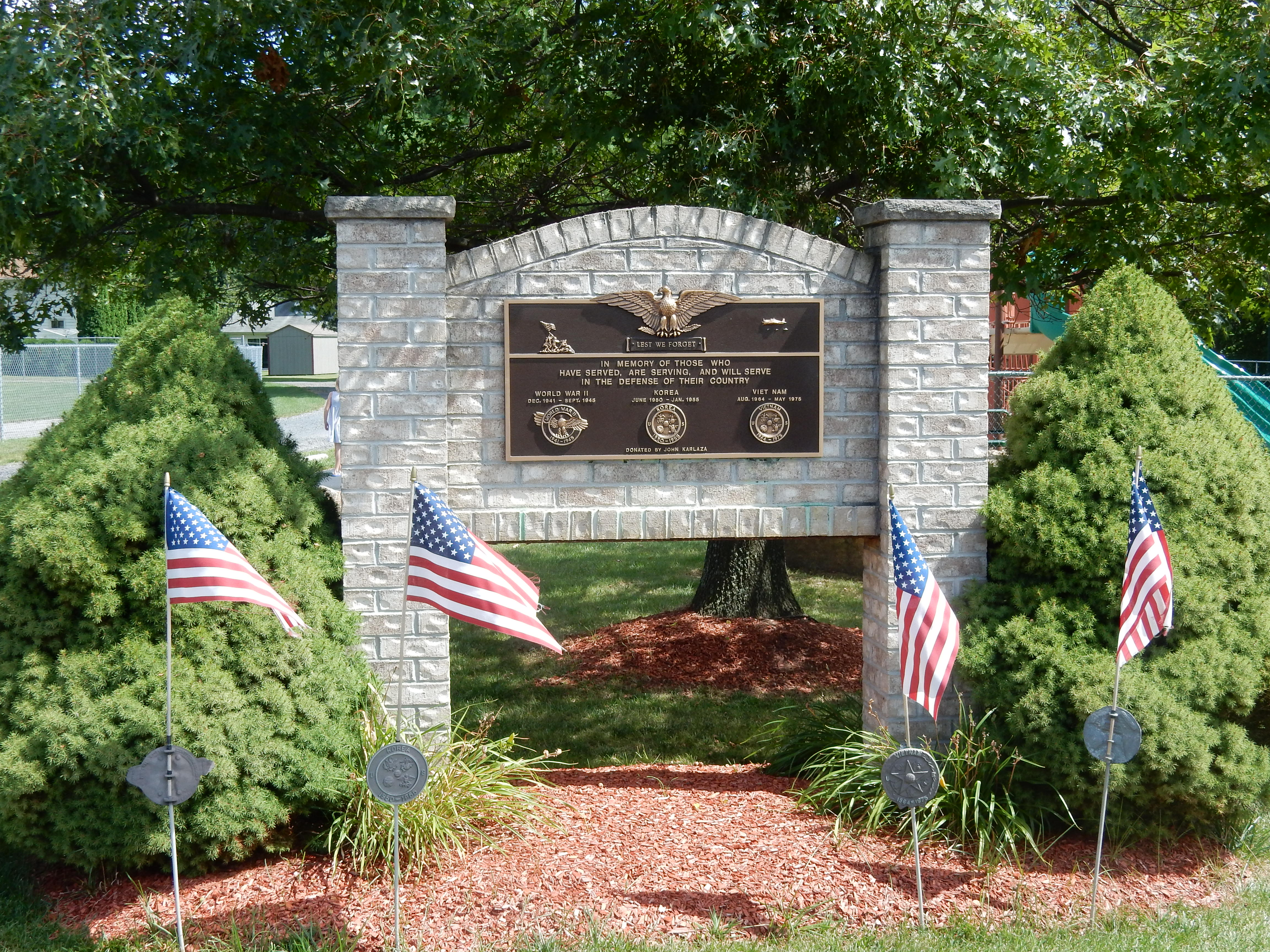
War Memorial in Buck Run

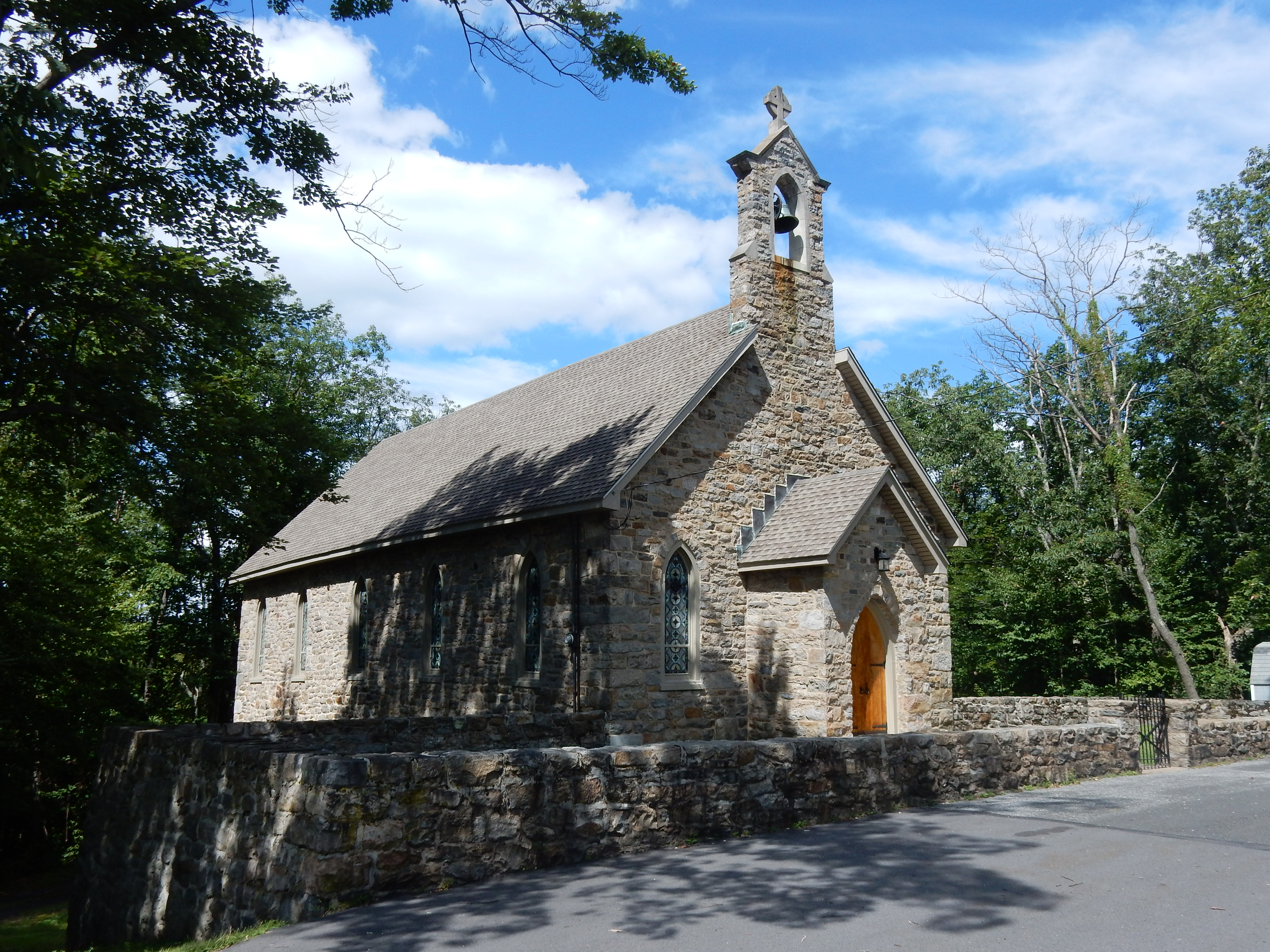
Buck Run. Trinity Chapel

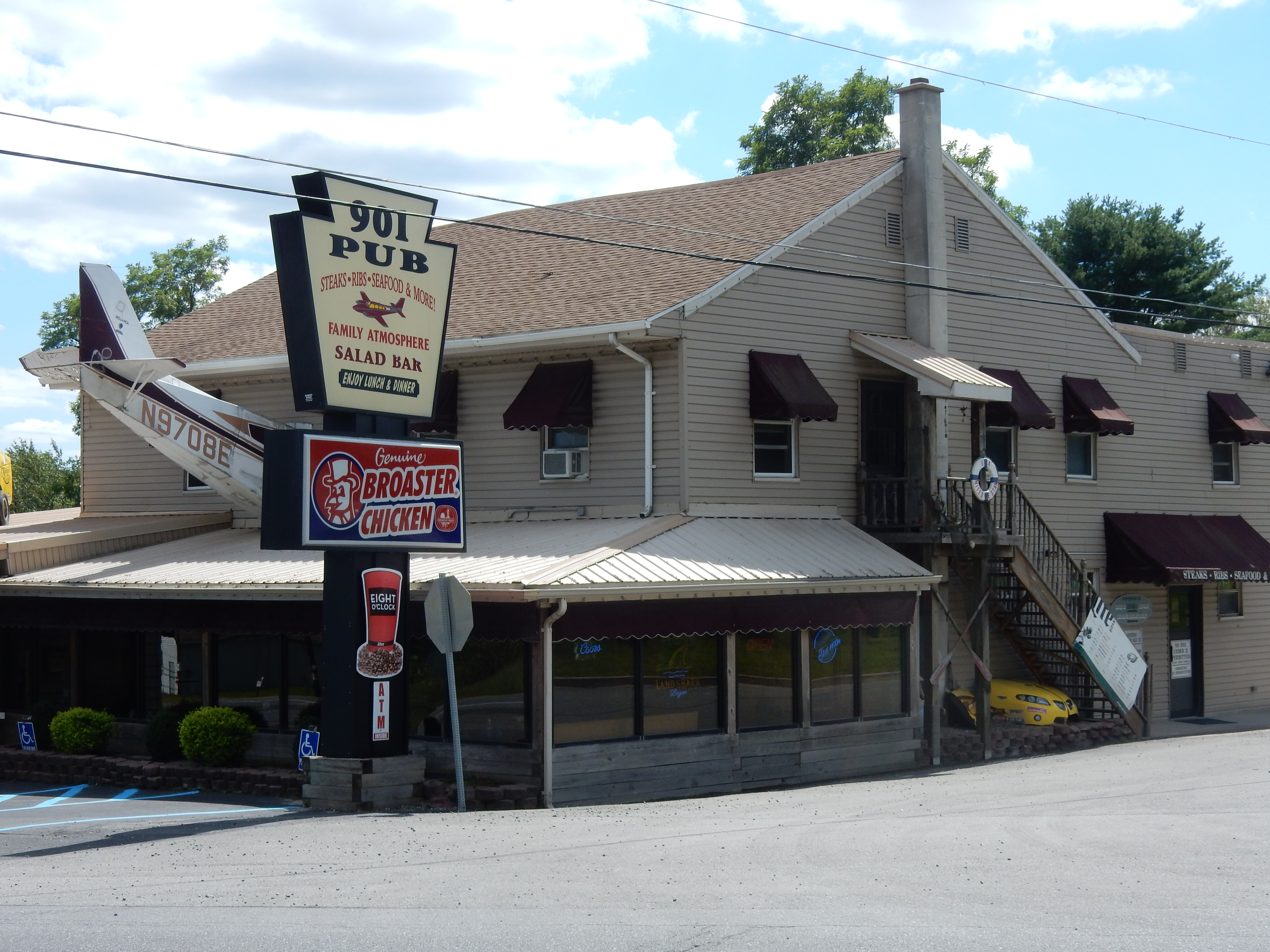
901 Pub on Sunbury Road
