= Lance J. Sussman =

American historian (born 1954)

- Born: Lance Jonathan Sussman; 17 July 1954 (age 72); Baltimore, Maryland
- Education: Doctor of Divinity Ph.D. in American Jewish History; Master of Arts in Hebrew Letters Bachelor of Arts in Religious Studies
- Alma mater: Hebrew Union College - Jewish Institute of Religion; Franklin and Marshall College
- Occupation: Rabbi Emeritus at Reform Congregation Keneseth Israel

Lance Jonathan Sussman (born July 17, 1954) is a historian of American Jewish History, college professor, Chair of the Board of Governors of Gratz College, Melrose Park, PA and until summer 2022 the senior rabbi, now emeritus, at Reform Congregation Keneseth Israel (KI) located in Elkins Park, PA. He is the author of books and articles including: Isaac Leeser and the Making of American Judaism (1995) and Sharing Sacred Moments (1999), and a co-editor of Reform Judaism in America: A Biographical Dictionary and Sourcebook (1993) and New Essays in American Jewish History (2009). Since 2010 he has also published articles on Judaism and art.

== Early life, family and education ==
Lance Jonathan Sussman was born in Baltimore, Maryland and raised in suburban Pikesville, Maryland. His father, Charles Sussman (1925–2010), was awarded a bronze star and other decorations for valor during World War II while serving in the 95th Infantry Division. After the war he was a teacher and an administrator in the Baltimore County Public Schools. His mother, Freda Sacki Sussman, was born in Bamberg, Germany in 1925. She fled Nazi Germany and resettled in the United States in 1938 and her family escaped the following year. Sussman married Elizabeth "Liz" Sussman (née Zeller) on August 6, 1977 in Rye, New York. She has had a career as both a Jewish educator and a music educator. They have five children and two grandchildren. Sussman also has a sister Marcelle who is a journalist.

In 1972, Sussman graduated from Pikesville Senior High School where in addition to his academic work, he was President of the Poetry Club. He then attended Franklin and Marshall College in Lancaster, Pennsylvania. In 1975, after only three years in college, he was elected to Phi Beta Kappa and graduated cum laude with a BA in Religious Studies. While attending Franklin and Marshall, he also studied Hebrew language at the Hebrew University of Jerusalem. From 1975 to 1987, Sussman attended Hebrew Union College-Jewish Institute of Religion (HUC-JIR) in Cincinnati, Ohio. HUC-JIR is the rabbinical seminary for North American Reform Judaism. He received a Masters of Arts in Hebrew Letters in 1979 and was ordained as a Rabbi by HUC-JIR in June, 1980. While studying for his rabbinical degree he was awarded the Mrs. Arthur Hays Sulzberger Prize in Homiletics for the Best Short Sermon.

Before his ordination, Sussman was a student rabbi at Beth Boruk Temple, in Richmond, Indiana, where he wrote and published The Emergence of A Jewish Community in Richmond, Indiana (1981). This was Sussman's first published work in American Jewish History and the beginning of his scholarship on the history of Jewish communities in America. After ordination, Sussman remained at HUC-JIR where he earned a Ph.D. in American Jewish History in 1987, studying under Jacob Rader Marcus, the most senior scholar of American Jewish History, and Jonathan D. Sarna, who is currently at Brandeis University. Sussman's dissertation, "The Life and Career of Isaac Leeser (1806-1896): A Study of American Judaism in its Formative Period," was later published as Isaac Leeser and the Making of American Judaism (1995). Ironically, Leeser was a leader of the Jewish community in Philadelphia, where Sussman would ultimately spend the bulk of his rabbinical career. In 2005, HUC-JIR awarded Sussman an honorary Doctorate of Divinity.

== Early career ==
From 1982 to 1986, while writing his doctoral dissertation, Sussman served as the rabbi of Temple Beth Shalom in Middleton, Ohio. In 1987, Sussman joined the faculty of the history department at the State University of New York at Binghamton (SUNY Binghamton), which is now called Binghamton University. He was also a faculty member of the Judaic Studies Department. Sussman remained at SUNY Binghamton until 2001, where he was promoted to Associate Professor with tenure. In 1997–98, he was the chair of the Judaic Studies Department. From 1990 to 2001 he served as the founding President of Hillel at SUNY Binghamton. In addition, from 1986 to 1990 he served as the rabbi at a Reconstructionist congregation, Temple Beth-El, in Endicott, New York. From 1990 to 2001, in addition to teaching at SUNY Binghamton, he was also the rabbi at the much larger Temple Concord, a Reform congregation, in Binghamton, NY. While at SUNY Binghamton, Sussman taught courses on American Jewish history, modern Jewish history, and world religious history and directed many Ph.D. students. During his years at SUNY Binghamton, Sussman was also a Group Leader for Birthright Israel and the founder of Keshet Press, a not-for-profit company which published books on Jewish history in the southern tier of New York. While in Binghamton, Sussman also developed an exhibit for the University museum on Jewish migration and history in the southern tier of New York titled "Beyond the Catskills," and published a communal history by the same name in 1989. In 1995, Sussman created Hanukkah House, a seasonal holiday museum, located in the historic Jonas M. Kilmer House, known as the 'Kilmer Mansion', on the grounds of Temple Concord.

== Philadelphia career and Reform Congregation Keneseth Israel ==
In 2001, Sussman moved to metropolitan Philadelphia where he accepted the pulpit at Reform Congregation Keneseth Israel (KI), which is the oldest reform congregation in Pennsylvania. KI was founded in 1847 as an orthodox synagogue and became a reform congregation in 1855. It was the fifth reform congregation in the United States. KI is remarkable for the longevity of its rabbis. Sussman is only the eighth senior rabbi in KI's 160 years as a reform congregation. Among his predecessors are three extraordinary figures in American Jewish history. Rabbi David Einhorn (1809–1879), was the most prominent Jewish abolitionist of the American Civil War era. Einhorn began his American career in Baltimore, where ironically Sussman was raised, but was forced to move to Philadelphia because of his opposition to slavery. During his tenure (1861–1866) KI became known as "The Abolitionist Temple". Rabbi Joseph Krauskopf (1858–1923), founded the National Farm School in 1896 (now Delaware Valley University in Doylestown, Pennsylvania). He later served as a chaplain for American forces under Col. Theodore Roosevelt at the Battle of San Juan Hill during the Spanish–American War. Rabbi Bertram Korn (1918–1979), who as a Rear Admiral in the Chaplain Corps was the first Jewish chaplain to receive flag rank in any of the U.S. armed forces. Like Sussman, Korn was a prominent historian of the American Jewish experience and remembered for his classic study, American Jewry and the Civil War (1951). In 2001 Sussman wrote a scholarly introduction for a 50th anniversary reprinting of this book. In 2019, KI created the Lance J Sussman Rabbinic Chair in honor of his 18th year leading the congregation. Sussman currently holds that chair.

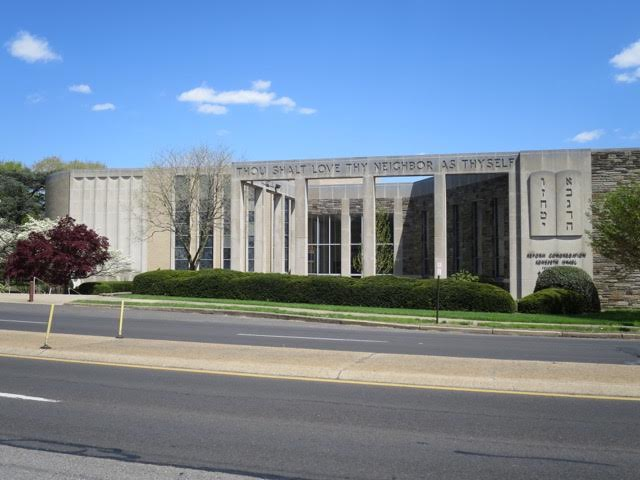
Keneseth Israel building on Old York Road, Elkins Park, PA

While serving as the senior rabbi at KI, Sussman also continued to teach at the university level. He has been a visiting professor, adjunct professor, or lecturer at, among others, Princeton University, Temple University, Hunter College (City University of New York), Rutgers University, Gratz College, and the New York City campus of HUC-JIR. Since its founding in 1998, he has been a member of the Academic Advisory and Editorial Board of the Jacob Rader Marcus Center of the American Jewish Archives at HUC-JIR in Cincinnati, Ohio. He also served as a trustee of Delaware Valley College (now Delaware Valley University), the Herbert D. Katz Center for Advanced Judaic Studies at the University of Pennsylvania, and the American Jewish Historical Society in New York City. In 2015 he became a member of the Board of Governors of Gratz College, and in July 2019 he became the Chair of the Board of Governors. He also worked closely with the National Museum of American Jewish History in Philadelphia, Pennsylvania. Sussman regularly gives public lectures and presentations and has spoken at, among others, the American Jewish Committee in Berlin, Germany, Jagellonian University in Kraków, Poland, the Gershman YMHA (Young Men's Hebrew Association) Jewish Community Center in Philadelphia, the Center for Jewish History in New York City, the Annual Convention of the Central Conference of American Rabbis, the biennial conference of the Union for Reform Judaism, Princeton University, and the National Museum of American Jewish History. He has served as an adviser to numerous public exhibitions at museums and other cultural institutions and been involved with many public television (PBS)programs.

== Rabbinic Platform of 1998 ==
Between 1998 and 2001, Sussman was active in a national debate among Reform leaders over the direction of the Movement. In 1998 the magazine Reform Judaism published a draft of a new platform for the movement. In May 1999, the annual meeting of the Central Conference of American Rabbis (CCAR), which is the organization of Reform Rabbis in the United States and Canada, debated this platform. In that debate Sussman offered numerous amendments to the proposed platform, many of which were adopted. After it was passed, Sussman publicly remarked, that despite his amendments, the new Platform, "doesn’t really address the religious needs of Reform Judaism at this time." In 2001 Sussman, working with Rabbi Robert M. Seltzer, a professor at Hunter College, City University of New York, responded to the 1999 platform by publishing "A Statement of Principles for Reform Judaism As it Approaches its Third Century." This document challenged the leadership of the Reform Movement to develop a more modern and forward thinking of the nature of Reform Judaism. The "Statement" was initially published in Rabbi Judith S. Lewis's edited volume, Thinking Ahead: Toward the Next Generation of Judaism (2001). It has since appeared on a number of internet sites. In response to the proposed platform in Reform Judaism in 1998 Sussman joined a group of other rabbis in founding the Association for Progressive Judaism. From 2013 to the end of 2018 he served as the national president of that organization.

The Seltzer/Sussman "Statement" asserted that "Judaism has always been capable of adapting to unforeseeable situations while preserving its core of symbols and ideals." Grounded in Jewish history, the two Rabbis (who are also historians) argued that Judaism's "record of this adaptability and enduring faith" needed to be continued into the 21st Century. They declared:

"We affirm that Judaism offers a spiritual grounding in a cosmic order that evokes in us awe and mystery. We insist that morality is central to Judaism and this cosmic order confers ethical responsibilities on us as beings with the capacity to choose between good and evil. We are convinced that modern historical and scientific knowledge has far-reaching implications for our understanding of the universe, the evolution of religion, and the development of Judaism – and that this knowledge calls on us to reexamine our presuppositions in every generation."

They emphasized the importance of Reform Judaism in "affirming the exemplary power of morally courageous deeds, the sanctity of life, and the possibility of personal transcendence through the apprehension of spiritual beauty." They further argued that modern Judaism should be understood as "compatible with reason, historical knowledge, scientific thought, and democratic values."

The "Statement" concluded by reaffirming the "uniqueness of the Jewish people" and their "central role in the spiritual history of humanity." Seltzer and Sussman urged Reform Jewish leaders to "recommit" the movement to the "highest moral and religious values" and "to the ideals of truthfulness, justice, compassion, and universal peace as envisioned by the prophets – humanity’s best hope in the new age it has entered."

Despite Sussman's criticism of the CCAR platform, his Rabbinic colleagues made him the chair of the CCAR Press. In that capacity he led a special taskforce to oversee the final production of Mishkan T’Filah: A Reform Siddur (2007), the new prayer book of the Reform Movement.

== Academic and popular writing ==
Throughout his career Sussman has been an active scholar, writer, and public speaker. His revised doctoral dissertation, Isaac Leeser and the Making of American Judaism (1995), is the only modern biography of one of the most important American Jewish leaders in the antebellum and civil war eras. Writing in American Jewish History, the major professional specialty journal for this subject, a reviewer noted: "This outstanding, full-length monograph by Lance Sussman is by far the most comprehensive work to date and is likely to remain the definitive work on Leeser for many years to come." This scholar noted that Sussman's book was "well-researched, utilizing archival sources that hitherto were not consulted, this book is rich with discussion and analysis and includes several episodes not previously brought to light." Similarly, a reviewer in The Journal of American History noted "The author's account of Leeser's life fills an important hiatus in American Jewish historiography. His use of primary sources is extensive. The author's very readable text of biography and religious history will please both academician and layman alike." A major tool for librarians, OCLC World Cat, concluded serious libraries should buy the book because "The author provides remarkable insight into the early development of organized Jewish life in the United States" in "a comprehensive work about a long-neglected but central figure" of the nineteenth century American Jewish community. Another historian described the book as a "major contribution" and "the most comprehensive study of one of the most important Jewish leaders in pre-Civil War America." Indeed, Isaac Leeser and Sussman's other books have received favorable reviews in major academic journals and on-line resources that cover both U.S. history in general and also Judaic Studies.

In addition to his academic scholarship (see publications list below) Sussman is an active public intellectual. He has given talks throughout the United States as well as overseas, and writes for newspapers and online publications as well. For example, in January 2013 Sussman wrote "Spielberg's Lincoln and the Jews: An Untold Story" for the online publication Jewish Ideas Daily This article was then reprinted in number of Jewish newspapers around the country including The Crescent City Jewish News in New Orleans, the New Jersey Jewish News, and JewishJournal.com.

== Public service ==
=== Interfaith work ===
In the early 1990s Sussman worked with the Community Hunger Outreach Warehouse (CHOW) to collect and distribute food in Binghamton NY. CHOW worked with a number of religious organizations to fight hunger in the community. One site of distribution was Temple Concord where Sussman was the rabbi. In 2002, shortly after he arrived in the Philadelphia area, he was the founding president of the Cheltenham Area Multifaith Council (CAMC). Participants included Christians, Muslims, Buddhists, and Jews. After the attack on the World Trade Center (9-11) in 2001 he worked with the Foundation for Ethnic Understanding to promote Jewish-Muslim dialog. With the FFEU he participated in programming at the United States House of Representatives and at the United Nations on promoting Muslim-Jewish understanding. Sussman's picture appeared in an FFUE's full page ad in the New York Times. (April 13, 2008) . In the Philadelphia area he worked with the Peace Islands Institute to foster Muslim-Jewish dialog. He has also worked with the Thanks-Giving Square Foundation, a Dallas, Texas-based UN NGO that promotes global interfaith understanding through the practice of giving thanks. On March 1, 2001 Sussman gave the opening prayer for a session of the United States House of Representatives. In the wake of the earthquake in Haiti in 2010, Sussman helped run a fund raising effort at KI in collaboration with local Haitian organizations.

=== Social activism ===
Sussman has made trips to the Soviet Union (1987) and Cuba (January 5–13, 2009) to show solidarity with Jews under totalitarian regimes and to help collect information about Jewish communities in these countries. From 2003 to 2006 Sussman worked with the German government to bring three groups of high school students from Frankfort to stay at homes of Jewish families affiliated with KI and similarly sent three groups of Jewish high school students from KI to Germany. From 2015 until January 2019, Sussman served as a Trustee of the American Board of IsraAID(founded in 2001), an Israeli-based not-for-profit humanitarian aid organization that has been engaged in emergency medical and rescue efforts after disasters such as the earthquake in Haiti, tsunamis in Sri Lanka and Japan, and Syrian refugees in Jordan.

== Pulpit innovations ==
Sussman has been highly innovative in his pulpit work combining art and high technology both for services and adult education. After studying the history of Jewish Art and publishing a number of historical articles, he began working with his Cantor at Keneseth Israel, to develop "Visual T'fillot (prayer), in which entire services including the Hebrew-English liturgy, transliteration, original art and video were combined. Keneseth Israel remodeled its 1,000-seat sanctuary to accommodate the new technological needs, a project requiring nearly one million dollars to complete. Sussman also developed a similar approach to Adult Education in the sanctuary by collaborating with a local digital artist, Joan Myerson Shrager. Together, they produced 90 lectures on Jewish Art and history between 2010 and 2015. For the synagogue's Preschool, Sussman created the (Avenue Q-size) KI Puppets. Sussman commissioned Philadelphia based theater set designer, Glen Lash, to produce the puppets and a New York City commercial songwriter, Paul Suchow, to compose the puppet songs.

== Publications ==
=== Selected books ===
- New Essays in American Jewish History. KTAV Publishing House, Inc.. Jersey City, New Jersey. ed: Pamela S. Nadell, Jonathan D Sarna, Lance J. Sussman. (2009). ISBN 978-1-60280-148-6.
- Sharing Sacred Moments. Keshet Press. Binghamton, New York. (1999). ISBN 1-892006-03-0.
- In Our Midst: How the Holocaust Touched One American Community. Keshet Press. Binghamton, New York. (1997). co-author: Mary Rose. ISBN 1-883058-37-6 (hard cover) 1-883058-36-8 (soft cover).
- Isaac Leeser and the Making of American Judaism. Wayne State University Press. Detroit, Michigan. (1995). ISBN 0-8143-1996-3.
- Reform Judaism in American: A Biographical Dictionary and Sourcebook. Greenwood Press. Westport, Connecticut. ed: Kerry M. Olitzky, Lance J. Sussman, Malcolm H. Stern. (1993). ISBN 0-313-24628-9.
- Beyond the Catskills: Jewish Life in Binghamton, New York, 1850–1975. State University of New York at Binghamton. Binghamton, New York. (1989)
- The Emergence of a Jewish Community in Richmond, Indiana. The Indiana Jewish Historical Society, Inc. Fort Wayne, Indiana. (1981) http://id.loc.gov/authorities/names/n82134706.html

=== Selected articles and book chapters ===
- "Rabbi Joseph Krauskopf, Reform Triumphalism, and the 1885 Pittsburgh Platform". November, 2015. http://www.reformjudaism.org/practice/what-reform-judaism/rabbi-joseph-krauskopf-reform-triumphalism-and-1885-pittsburgh-platform
- "100 Years After WWI, Its Effect on Reform Judaism is Still Felt". August 6, 2015. http://www.reformjudaism.org/blog/2015/08/06/100-years-after-wwi-its-effect-reform-judaism-still-felt#sthash.4dlhy4C1.dpuf
- "The Rise of the Reform Rabbinate: Rabbinic Road Out of a Wilderness". August, 2015. http://www.reformjudaism.org/rise-reform-rabbinate-rabbinic-road-out-wilderness#sthash.GzcYDHTP.dpuf
- From Battle to Metaphor: The Meaning of Waterloo in Modern Jewish History" June 18, 2015. http://www.reformjudaism.org/blog/2015/06/18/battle-metaphor-meaning-waterloo-modern-jewish-history
- "The Confirmation Revolution: Then and Now". May 21, 2015. http://www.reformjudaism.org/blog/2015/05/21/confirmation-revolution-then-and-now
- "Seeing is Believing: Visual T’filot and the Future of Jewish Worship" eJewish Philanthropy. May 20, 2015. http://ejewishphilanthropy.com/seeing-is-believing-visual-tfilot-and-the-future-of-jewish-worship
- "On God" (1). ed: Rabbi Paul Citrin. Lights in the Forest: Rabbis Respond to Twelve Essential Jewish Questions. CCAR Press. 2014. : pp. 42–46.
- "Once Upon a Neighborhood: Jewish Life in Philadelphia". Jewish Exponent. JWEX. August 14, 2014. Readerperiodicals. ISSN 0021-6437.
- "The Jewish Context: American Jewish Leadership" (4). ed. Sharon Henderson Callahan. Religious Leadership. Formal and Informal Religious Leadership in the U.S. Context: Volume One. SAGE Publications, Inc. Thousand Oaks, CA. 2013. ISBN 978-1-4129-9908-3.
- "Faith in Art: Visual Culture and the Future of Judaism". CCAR Journal: The Reform Jewish Quarterly. Winter, 2013. http://www.ccarnet.org/rabbis-speak/ccar-journal-reform-jewish-quarterly/winter-2013/
- "They Could Have All Been Saved". Jewish Ideas Daily. May 2, 2013. http://www.jewishideasdaily.com/6423/features/they-all-could-have-been-saved-2/
- "HBO DOCUMENTARY: THEY ALL COULD HAVE BEEN SAVED RABBI LANCE SUSSMAN****". ed. Ruth King. "Ruthfully Yours". May 2, 2013. http://www.ruthfullyyours.com/2013/05/02/hbo-documentary-they-all-could-have-been-saved-rabbi-lance-sussman/
- Sussman, Lance J. (February 2013). "An untold story". New Jersey Jewish News. 67 (7): 26.
- "Spielberg's 'Lincoln' and the Jews: An Untold Story" Crescent City Jewish News New Orleans, LA. January 18, 2013. http://www.crescentcityjewishnews.com/spielbergs-lincoln-and-the-jews-an-untold-story/
- "Seeing Our Future: Reform Judaism and Visual Culture" Journal of Reform Judaism. 2012.
- "The Rise of the Reform Rabbinate: Rabbinic Road Out of a Wilderness. A conversation with Rabbis Steve Fox and Lance Sussman, CCAR chief executive and national chair of the press, on the dramatic rise of the Reform rabbinate". Summer 2011. http://rjmag.org/Articles/index.cfm?id=280
- "Transcending an Artless Tradition". Reform Judaism. Winter, 2010. http://rjmag.org/Articles/index.cfm?id=1846
- "Prospects for American Judaism". Jewish Review of Books. Spring, 2010.
- "God in America:Interview-Lance Sussman". Transcript. May 27, 2009. https://www.pbs.org/godinamerica/interviews/lance-sussman.html
- "The ‘Press Release’: Announcing U.S. Recognition of Israel". ed. Paul Finkelman. Milestone Documents in American History. Vol. 3: 1888–1955. 2008.
- "Reform Judaism" ed. Stephen Harlan Norwood, Eunice G. Pollack. Encyclopedia of American Jewish History. Vol 1. ABC-CLIO. Santa Barbara, CA. 2008. ISBN 978-1-85109-638-1.
- "Isaac Leeser" ed. Stephen Harlan Norwood, Eunice G. Pollack. Encyclopedia of American Jewish History. Vol 1. ABC-CLIO. Santa Barbara, CA. 2008. ISBN 978-1-85109-638-1.
- "David Einhorn" ed. Stephen Harlan Norwood, Eunice G. Pollack. Encyclopedia of American Jewish History. Vol 1. ABC-CLIO. Santa Barbara, CA. 2008. ISBN 978-1-85109-638-1.
- "A Delicate Balance: Reform Rabbis Debate Officiation at Mixed Marriages, 1840–2005". CCAR Journal: The Reform Jewish Quarterly. Spring, 2006.
- "The Myth of the Trefa Banquet: American Culinary Culture and Radicalization of Food Policy in Reform Judaism". American Jewish Archives Journal. LVII No. 1 & 2. 2005. pp. 29–52. Reprinted in: The Sacred Table – Creating a Jewish Food Ethic. (2) CCAR Press. 2011. pp. 17–48. ed: Mary L. Zamore. ISBN 978-0-88123-170-0. http://americanjewisharchives.org/publications/journal/PDF/2005_57_01_02_sussman.pdf
- "Let Freedom Ring: A Rabbinic Reflection on the Liberty Bell, Public Judaism, and Celebrate 350". CCAR Journal. Fall, 2004. pp. 25–31.
- "Thinking Ahead: Toward the Next Generation of Judaism". ed: Rabbi Judith S. Lewis. Keshet Press. Binghamton, NY. 2001. pp. 13–16.
- "Pittsburgh II and the Crisis of Confidence in the Reform Rabbinate" CCAR Journal. Co-Author: Robert M. Seltzer. Winter, 2000. pp. 26–33.
- "Reform Judaism Reconsiders Rituals it Shed A Century Ago". Co-Authors: Nadine Brozan and Gustav Niebuhr. New York Times, May 27, 1999.
- "Historian of the Jewish People: A Historiographical Reevaluation of the Writings of Jacob R. Marcus". American Jewish Archives Journal. Volume 50, 1998. pp 10–21.
- "Isaac Leeser and the 'Philadelphia Pattern' (2). ed: Murray Friedman. When Philadelphia Was the Capital of Jewish America. Associated University Presses, Inc. 1993. : pp. 22-33.
- "The Suburbanization of American Judaism as Reflected in Synagogue Architecture, 1944–1984". American Jewish History. September, 1985. pp. 31–47.
- "Another Look at Isaac Leeser and the First Jewish Translation of the Bible in the United States". Modern Judaism: A Journal of Jewish Ideas and Experience. May, 1985. pp. 159–190.
- "Toward Better Understanding: The Rise of the Interfaith Movement in America and the Role of Rabbi Isaac Landman". American Jewish Archives Journal. 1982. pp. 35–51.

=== Media ===
==== Video documentaries ====
- God in America: "T'reifah Banquet" (Episode 4). Produced and Directed by: Sarah Colt. WGBH: Frontline/American Experience. 2010. PBS Television Series (November, 2011). DVD. Transcript: https://www.pbs.org/godinamerica/transcripts/hour-four.html
- Voices for Justice: Reform Rabbis and Moral Leadership in America – A Videographic History. Co-Producer: Gary Zola. The Jacob Rader Marcus Center of the American Jewish Archives. Cincinnati, OH. 2008. 55 mins. DVD.
- I Believe: Reform Judaism. Season 1; Episode 10. Producer: Dennis Wholey. PBS. Washington, DC. Apr 11, 2007. 26 mins.
- " We Don’ t Say Goodbye": Southern Tier People Remember the Holocaust. Written and Produced by: Bill Jaker. Narrated by: Heather Dunbar. 2005. WSKG Telecommunications Council, Binghamton, NY. DVD. Based on In Our Midst (see selected books above).

==== Other media ====
- Jews in Western Europe. 2013. Gratz College. Melrose Park, PA. Online Course SP13: Lectures 2, 3, and 11. Running times vary. https://www.youtube.com/watch?v=pL1HXAgfOOw; https://www.youtube.com/watch?v=aEWDUnp4ivE; https://www.youtube.com/watch?v=aT9gIt8AQeA
- Our Founders: Radical Visionaries / Moderate Pragmatists: David Einhorn, Isaac Mayer Wise, and Stephen S. Wise. Part 2. Followed by a Dialogue between their Successors(Session III). Co-Presenter: Rabbi David Ellenson, Ph.D., President, HUC-JIR. 2013. SCRJ (Society for Classical Reform Judaism) Symposium. 1:30:32 mins. https://www.youtube.com/watch?v=2voo_XnMOY8
- "What will Jewish Belonging look like in 20 years?". Jewish Life in 2030: A Working Conference for a Vibrant Jewish Future. Co-presenter: Rabbi Edythe Mencher. May 23, 2011. Shalom TV. Jewish Outreach Institute. New York, NY. 46:47 mins. https://www.youtube.com/watch?v=nej0lswyVZQ
- Hope for Haiti Benefit. Feb 3, 2010. Elkins Park KI. 8:19 mins. https://www.youtube.com/watch?v=grgcPJKVMrA
- Congressional Record: Call to Order and Prayer. Mar 1, 2001. House of Representatives, United States Congress. Uploaded Aug 11, 2014. 1:09 mins. http://www.c-span.org/video/?c4506229/rabbi-lance-sussman-temple-concord-binghamton-ny http://www.c-span.org/video/?c4506231/rep-maurice-hinchey-remarks-rabbi-lance-sussman
