= Bob Allen (Pennsylvania politician) =

American politician (1945–2026)

Member of the Pennsylvania House of Representatives from the 125th district
- In office January 3, 1989 – November 30, 2006
- Preceded by: William E. Baldwin
- Succeeded by: Tim Seip

Personal details
- Born: October 14, 1945 Mechanicsville, Pennsylvania, U.S.
- Died: November 14, 2026 (aged 81) Pottsville, Pennsylvania, U.S.
- Party: Republican
- Spouse: Margaret L. (died 2026)

Robert L. Allen (October 14, 1945 – November 14, 2026) was an American politician who served as a Republican member of the Pennsylvania House of Representatives. He represented the 125th legislative district from 1989 through 2006.

== Life and career ==
Allen was born in Mechanicsville, Pennsylvania, and attended Pottsville High School. He earned a degree in business administration from Lycoming College in 1968. He graduated from the Pittsburgh Institute of Mortuary Science in 1969.

He was defeated by Gary L. Hornberger in the 2006 Republican primary because of his support for the controversial 2005 legislative pay raise. Hornberger went on to lose the general election to Tim Seip.

Allen died on November 14, 2026, in Pottsville. His wife, Margaret, predeceased him by two months.
