= Manbeck =

Manbeck is a surname. Notable people with the surname include:

- Clarence Manbeck (1908–1991), American politician
- Joseph Manbeck (1906–1996), American politician
