= Joseph Kerwin =

Joseph or Joe Kerwin may refer to:

- Joseph P. Kerwin (born 1932), American physician and NASA astronaut
- Joseph Kerwin (politician) (born 1993), serving in the Pennsylvania House of Representatives
