= Schuylkill Haven station =

Railway station in Schuylkill Haven, Pennsylvania

Schuykill Haven
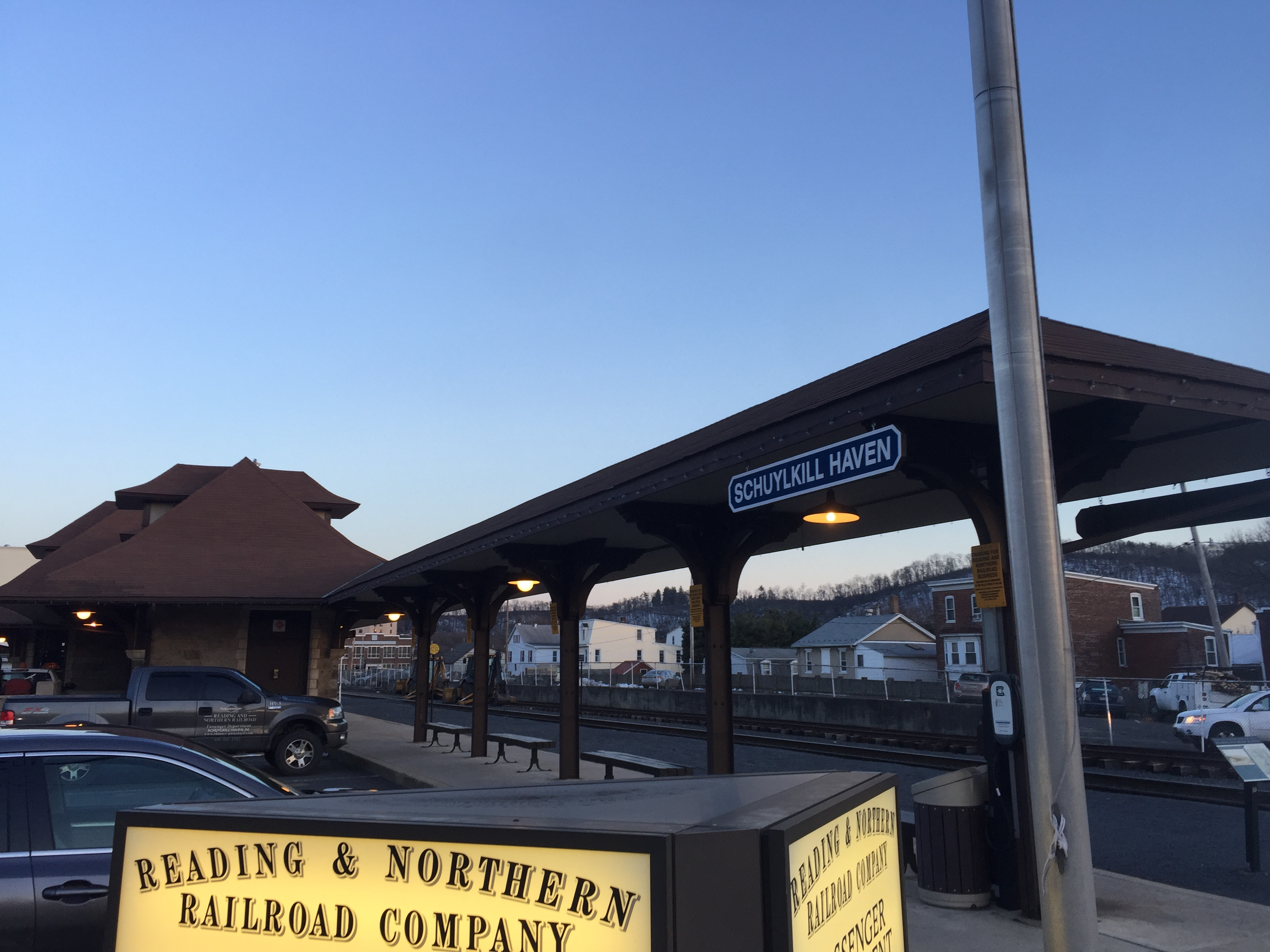
- Schuylkill Haven station in 2018

General information
- Location: 12 West Main; Schuylkill Haven, Pennsylvania, U.S.
- Coordinates: 40.6285°N 76.1725°W
- System: Former SEPTA regional rail station
- Owner: Reading Blue Mountain and Northern Railroad
- Platforms: 1 side platform
- Tracks: 2

Construction
- Accessible: No

History
- Opened: 1842
- Closed: June 30, 1981
- Rebuilt: 1901

Former services
Preceding station	SEPTA	Following station
Pottsville Terminus	Pottsville Line	Auburn toward Reading Terminal
Preceding station	Reading Railroad	Following station
Connor toward Pottsville	Main Line	Landingville toward Philadelphia
Cressona toward Glen Dower	Glen Dower Branch	Terminus
Location

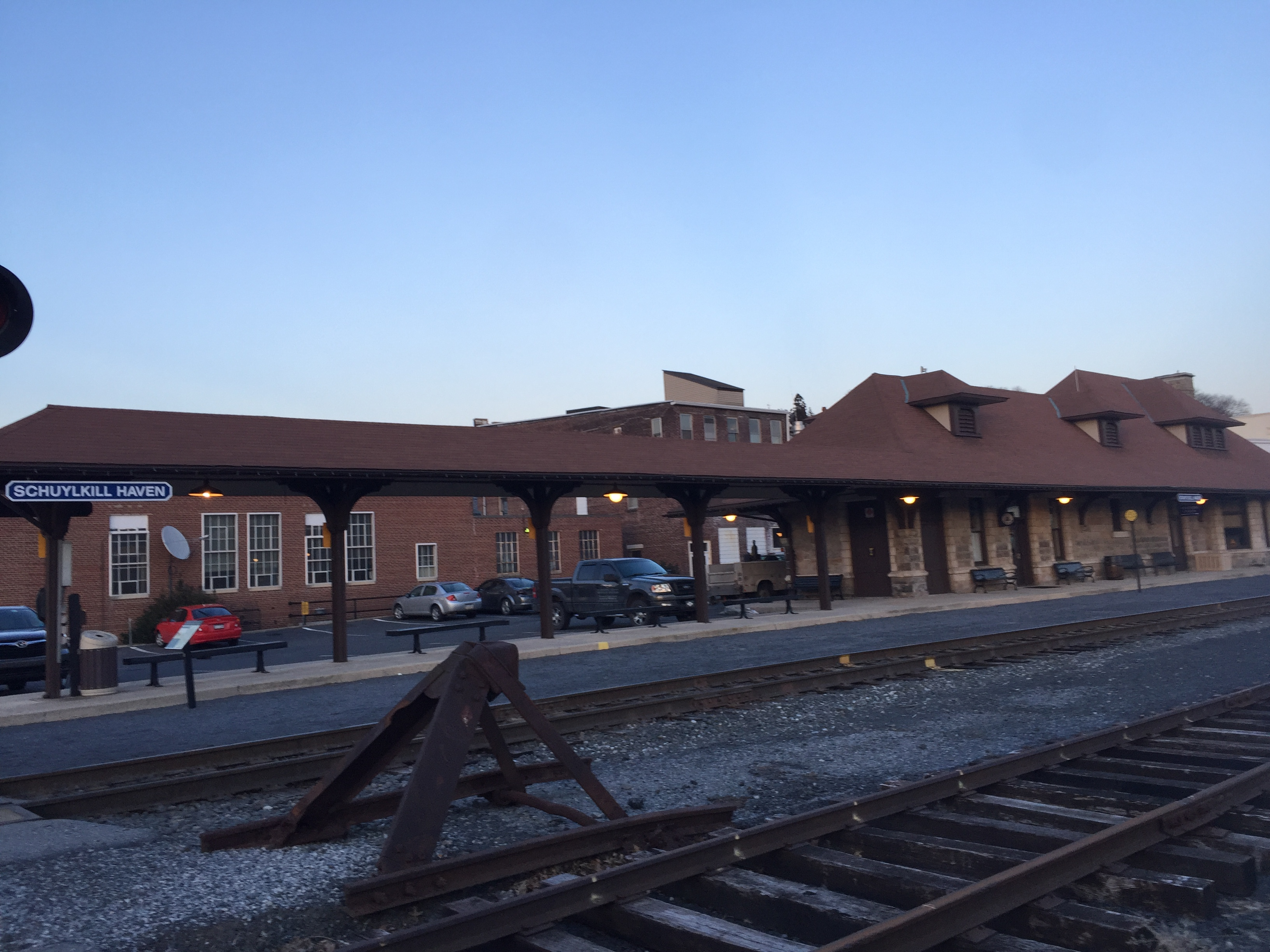
Schuylkill Haven station

Schuylkill Haven station is a former railroad station in Schuylkill Haven, Pennsylvania. It was located at 12 West Main Street, which is currently occupied by the Reading Blue Mountain and Northern Railroad office building.

The station was originally built by the Reading Railroad, and later served the SEPTA diesel service line that extended from the Norristown section of the Manayunk/Norristown Line to Pottsville, Pennsylvania. The station was taken out of service in 1981, when SEPTA cancelled its diesel service.
