= Timothy Seip =

American politician

Member of the Pennsylvania House of Representatives from the 125th district
- In office January 2, 2007 – November 30, 2010
- Preceded by: Bob Allen
- Succeeded by: Mike Tobash

Personal details
- Born: Timothy D. Seth; May 25, 1969 (age 57) Pottsville, Pennsylvania
- Party: Democratic
- Spouse: Starr
- Children: 1 child Elisa
- Nickname: Tim

Timothy D. "Tim" Seip (born May 25, 1969) is a former member of the Pennsylvania House of Representatives for the 125th legislative district. He was elected in 2006.

Seip graduated from Mansfield University with a degree in Criminal Justice Administration and Marywood University, with a master's in Social Work. Prior to elective office, he worked as a social worker at various locations.

On November 2, 2010, Seip was defeated for re-election by Republican Mike Tobash.

Seip has been an instructor in the Social Work Department at Kutztown University of Pennsylvania since 2011. He also serves as the Director of Field Education for the BSW program.
