= Joseph Manbeck =

American politician (1906–1996)

Member of the Pennsylvania House of Representatives from the 125th district
- In office January 7, 1969 – November 30, 1972
- Preceded by: District Created
- Succeeded by: William Hutchinson

Member of the Pennsylvania House of Representatives from the Schuylkill County district
- In office January 1, 1963 – November 30, 1968

Personal details
- Born: October 18, 1906 Summit Station, Pennsylvania, U.S.
- Died: September 22, 1996 (aged 89) Schuylkill Haven, Pennsylvania, U.S.
- Party: Republican

Joseph H. Manbeck (October 18, 1906 – September 22, 1996) was a Republican member of the Pennsylvania House of Representatives.
