= Arlin Adams =

American judge (1921–2015)

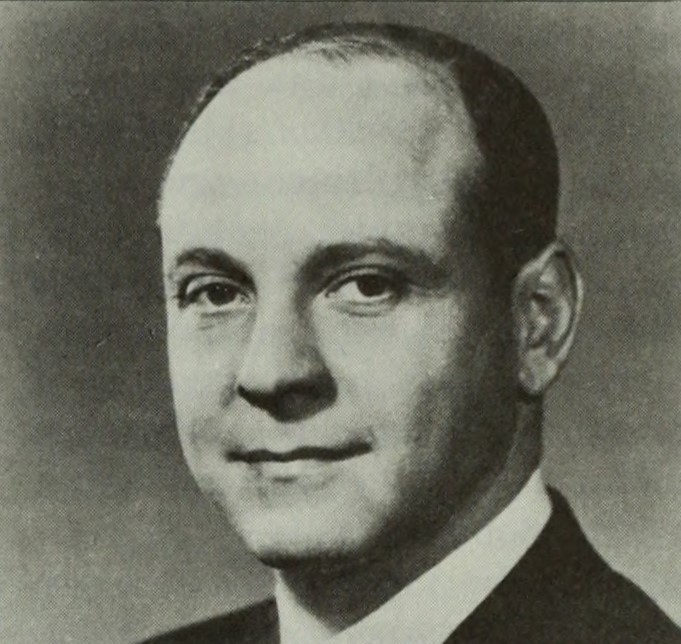

Judge of the United States Court of Appeals for the Third Circuit
- In office October 2, 1969 – January 2, 1987
- Appointed by: Richard Nixon
- Preceded by: Harry Ellis Kalodner
- Succeeded by: William D. Hutchinson

Personal details
- Born: Arlin Marvin Adams; April 16, 1921 Philadelphia, Pennsylvania, U.S.
- Died: December 22, 2015 (aged 94) Philadelphia, Pennsylvania, U.S.
- Party: Republican
- Education: Temple University (BS, MA); University of Pennsylvania (LLB)

Arlin Marvin Adams (April 16, 1921 – December 22, 2015) was a United States circuit judge of the United States Court of Appeals for the Third Circuit. As late as 2013 he served as counsel to Schnader Harrison Segal & Lewis LLP, and was listed as a NAFTA adjudicator.

== Early life and education ==
Born in Philadelphia, Pennsylvania, Adams was Jewish. He earned a Bachelor of Science degree in 1941 from Temple University, a Bachelor of Laws from the University of Pennsylvania Law School in 1947, and a Master of Arts degree from Temple in 1950. While at Penn, he served as editor-in-chief of the law review.

== Early career ==
Adams worked in private legal practice in Philadelphia from 1947 until 1969. He also was a member of the faculty of the University of Pennsylvania from 1952 until 1956. He was a secretary of public welfare for the Commonwealth of Pennsylvania from 1963 to 1966.

== Federal judicial service ==
On September 22, 1969, President Richard Nixon nominated Adams to a seat on the United States Court of Appeals for the Third Circuit that had been vacated by the decision by Judge Harry Ellis Kalodner to take senior status. The United States Senate confirmed Adams on October 1, 1969, and he received his commission on October 2, 1969. In 1971, President Richard Nixon came close to nominating Adams to the Supreme Court of the United States, but nominated William Rehnquist instead after the Third Circuit, in an opinion authored by Adams, reversed the convictions of several nuns involved in an anti-Vietnam War protest. In 1975 Adams was considered by President Gerald Ford as a nominee to the Supreme Court of the United States. Adams was one of two finalists; Ford ultimately wound up successfully nominating the other finalist, John Paul Stevens. He was also mentioned as a potential Supreme Court nominee in 1987 for the seat vacated by Lewis Powell, for which Robert Bork, Douglas Ginsburg, and Anthony Kennedy were eventually nominated.

== Retirement from the bench and later career ==
Adams retired outright from the bench (rather than taking senior status) on January 2, 1987. He returned to private practice, joining the firm Schnader Harrison Segal & Lewis LLP. Adams was well known for his post-judiciary roles in significant legal cases. In 1994, he conducted an investigation of the Pennsylvania attorney general for alleged criminal activity, and investigated allegations of improper medical research at Fox Chase Cancer Center. Soon after in 1995, he was appointed to serve as a trustee in the New Era bankruptcy case, at that time the largest nonprofit bankruptcy in history. He also served as the Chapter 11 Trustee in the successful reorganization of the Coram Healthcare Corporation in the Bankruptcy Court in Delaware. He was elected a Fellow of the American Academy of Arts and Sciences in 1996. From 1998 to 2002, Adams served as independent counsel in an investigation of the U.S. Department of Housing and Urban Development that uncovered widespread corruption.

== Board positions, appointments and honors ==
Adams service to society includes both legal and community capacities. Adams was a member of the Board of the Pennsylvania, and had previously served as a member of the board and Chairman of the Einstein Healthcare Network, trustee for the William Penn Foundation, the National Constitution Center, the Lincoln Charitable Trust and Bryn Mawr College and President of the congregation for Reform Congregation Keneseth Israel. He was a former chancellor of the Philadelphia Bar Association and past president of both the American Judicature Society and American Philosophical Society. He also was the former chair of the U.S. Supreme Court Judicial Fellows Commission.

In 2001, Susquehanna University created the Arlin M. Adams Center for Law and Society, and in 2005, with the support of the Annenberg Foundation, the University of Pennsylvania Law School established the Arlin M. Adams Professorship in Constitutional Law. The Drexel University School of Law established the Arlin M. Adams Professor of Legal Writing position in 2007 to recognize Adams' long career as a lawyer and judge.

== Books authored ==
- Nation Dedicated to Religious Liberty: The Constitutional Heritage of the Religion Clauses, Arlin M. Adams, Charles J. Emmerich, Warren E. Burger (University of Pennsylvania Press, August 1990)
- Religion and the Public Good: A Bicentennial Forum , William Lee Miller, Martin E. Marty, Arlin M. Adams (Mercer University Press, March 1989)

== See also ==
- Gerald Ford Supreme Court candidates

== Sources ==
Legal offices
Preceded by Harry Ellis Kalodner	Judge of the United States Court of Appeals for the Third Circuit; 1969–1987	Succeeded by William D. Hutchinson
