= Reform Congregation Keneseth Israel (Philadelphia) =

Reform Jewish synagogue in Philadelphia, USA

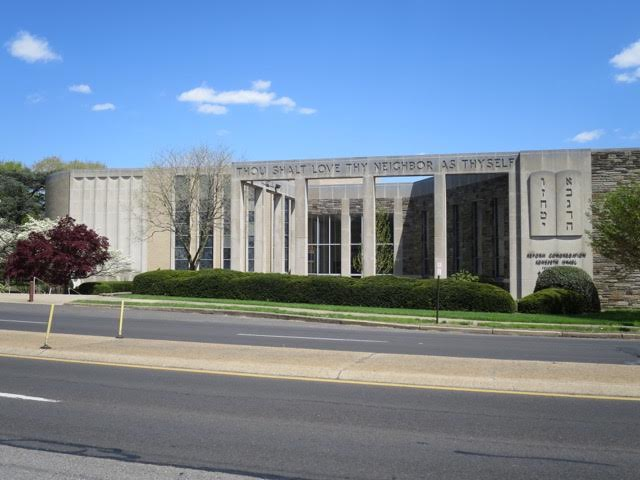
- Keneseth Israel synagogue entrance

- Location just outside the city limits of Philadelphia

Religion
- Affiliation: Reform Judaism
- Ecclesiastical or organizational status: Synagogue
- Leadership: Rabbi Benjamin P. David
- Status: Active

Location
- Location: 8339 Old York Road, Elkins Park, Greater Philadelphia, Pennsylvania 19027
- Country: United States
- Interactive map of Reform Congregation Keneseth Israel
- Coordinates: 40°05′09″N 75°07′38″W

Architecture
- Style: Synagogue
- Established: 1847 (as a congregation)
- Completed: 1891 (North Broad Street); 1956 (Elkins Park)

Website
- kenesethisrael.org

Reform Congregation Keneseth Israel (KI) is a Reform Jewish congregation and synagogue in Elkins Park, Pennsylvania.

The congregation was founded in Philadelphia in 1847 and is recognized as the sixth-oldest Reform congregation in the country. By 1900, it had become one of the largest Reform congregations in the United States.

The synagogue occupied several locations in Philadelphia before constructing a building on North Broad Street in 1891. In 1956, the congregation relocated to its current site in Elkins Park.

Since appointing its first rabbi in 1861, the congregation has been led by eight rabbis, including David Einhorn, Joseph Krauskopf, Bertram Korn, and Simeon Maslin, who served as president of the Central Conference of American Rabbis from 1995 to 1997. The current senior rabbi is Lance J. Sussman.

Notable members of the congregation have included Benjamin Netanyahu, Arlin Adams, Edward R. Becker, Jan E. DuBois, Horace Stern, members of the Gimbel family, Lessing J. Rosenwald, William S. Paley, Simon Guggenheim, and Walter Annenberg. Albert Einstein accepted honorary membership in 1934.

== Philadelphia's fourth synagogue, 1847-1855 ==
In 1847, Julius Stern led the establishment of Keneseth Israel as an Orthodox German-Jewish congregation. Stern and 47 other men separated from Congregation Rodeph Shalom to form the new synagogue. Until the 1880s, business meetings were conducted in German, and services were held in both German and Hebrew.

At its founding, the congregation employed a lay reader, B. H. Gotthelf, rented meeting space, and arranged for burial plots in a local cemetery. In 1849, Keneseth Israel established its first religious school, enrolling approximately 75 children for instruction in Hebrew and Jewish ritual.

In 1852, the congregation began including sermons in its services, marking a shift from traditional Orthodox practice and reflecting aspects of American Protestant worship. Around the same time, it adopted the recently published Hamburg Prayer Book, which was associated with Reform Judaism in Germany. In 1854, the congregation acquired its first building, a former church on New Market Street, which was rededicated and consecrated as a synagogue.

== German reform, 1855-1887 ==
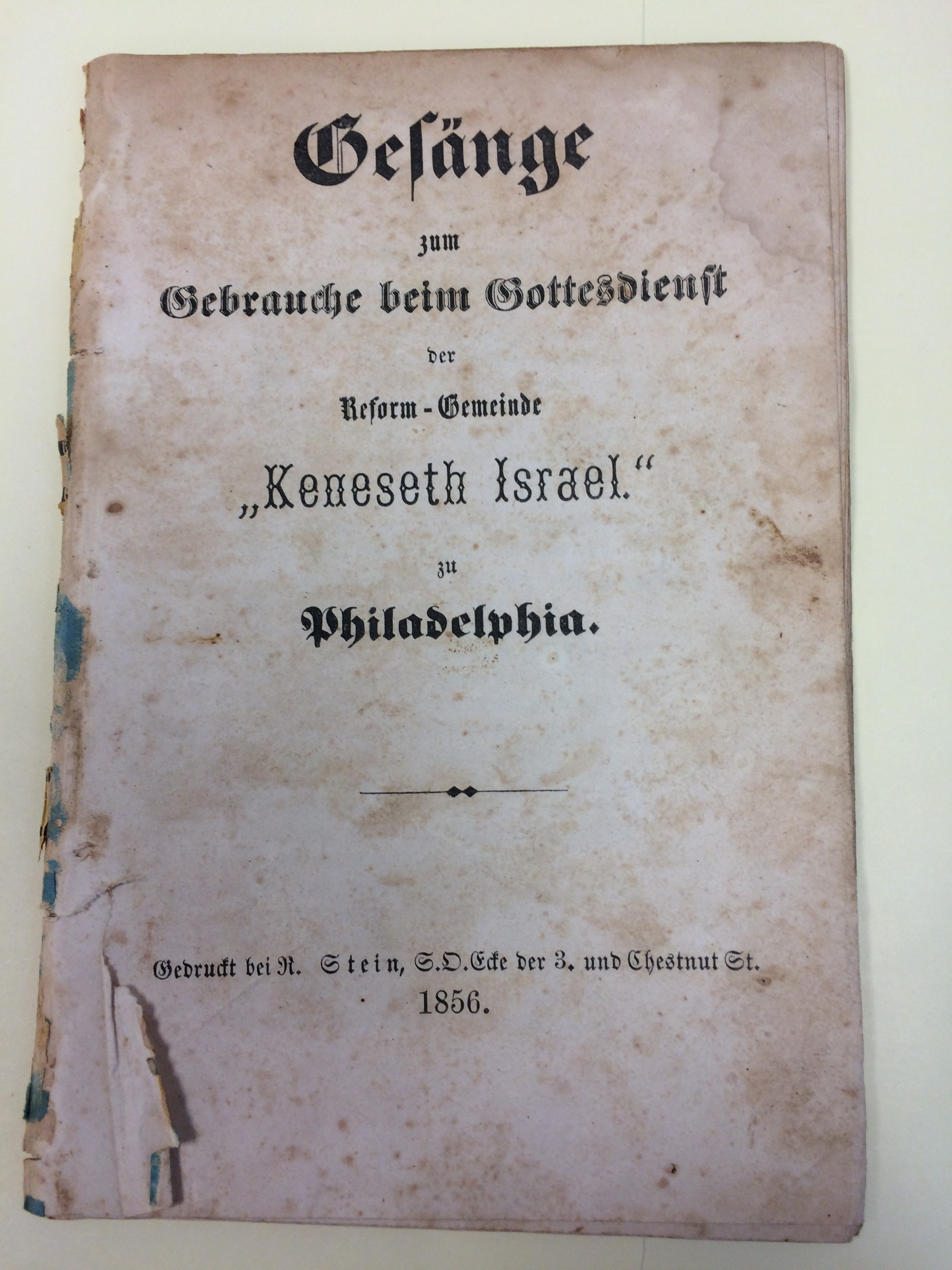
Gesänge zum Gebrauche beim Gottesdeinst der Reform-Gemeinde "Keneseth Israel" zu Philadelphia (From the Library of the Leo Baeck Institute New York, call number r 514.)

After relocating to its new building, Keneseth Israel purchased an organ, signifying a further transition away from Orthodox Judaism, which does not include instrumental music or choirs in worship services. In 1856, the congregation formally affiliated with the Reform movement and adopted the name Reform Congregation Keneseth Israel. That same year, it published its first book, Gesänge zum Gebrauche beim Gottesdeinst der Reform-Gemeinde "Keneseth Israel" zu Philadelphia ("Hymnal for the Order of Worship for the Reform Community Keneseth Israel of Philadelphia").

In 1857, the congregation appointed Solomon Deutsch, a Reform leader from Posen, Germany to officiate at services. Although not an ordained rabbi, Deutsch advanced the congregation’s adoption of Reform practices, including the abolition of separate seating for men and women. He was dismissed in 1860, and in 1861 the congregation appointed David Einhorn, an ordained rabbi.

=== Einhorn ===
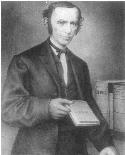
Rabbi David Einhorn (1809-1879)

In 1856, Einhorn had published a 64-page prayer pamphlet for use on Shabbat and the Biblical festivals—Sukkot, Passover, and Shavuot. In 1858, Einhorn released Olat Tamid: Gebetbuch für israelitische Reform-Gemeinden, the first Reform prayer book published in the United States. The work had a significant influence on American Reform Judaism. Olat Tamid eventually served as a foundation for the Union Prayer Book.

Einhorn was an outspoken critic of slavery. In January 1861, Rabbi Morris Jacob Raphall of Congregation B’nai Jeshurun in New York City delivered and published a sermon titled "The Bible View of Slavery", which defended slavery on biblical grounds. In response, Einhorn delivered a sermon in German condemning Raphall’s argument and later published an English translation in his monthly journal Sinai.

Einhorn’s public opposition to slavery provoked hostility in Baltimore. On April 19, 1861, a mob threatened to attack him, and he fled under guard to Philadelphia, where Reform Congregation Keneseth Israel soon appointed him as its first ordained rabbi. While at Keneseth Israel, Einhorn continued publishing Sinai and, in 1862, issued a second edition of Olat Tamid with financial support from the congregation. In 1866, he relocated to New York City to serve as rabbi of Congregation Adath Yeshurun.

Einhorn’s views and publications reflected a broader moral and social awareness shared by his congregation. In 1857, Keneseth Israel protested a treaty between the United States and Switzerland that allowed certain Swiss cantons to discriminate against American Jews despite nominal guarantees of equal rights. In 1860, the congregation sent financial aid to Jews facing persecution in Morocco. During the Civil War, members of the congregation supported the Union cause through donations and military service. Among them was Isaac Snellenberg, who enlisted at age 16 and died in the Peninsula Campaign in 1862, and Colonel Max Einstein, who later joined Keneseth Israel after commanding a Pennsylvania regiment at the First Battle of Bull Run.

=== Hirsch ===
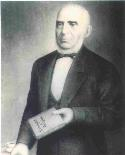
Rabbi Samuel Hirsch (1815-1889)

After David Einhorn’s departure for New York City, Keneseth Israel extended a lifetime contract to Rabbi Samuel Hirsch. Upon assuming leadership in Philadelphia, Hirsch guided the congregation toward further assimilation into American life. Hirsch introduced Sunday sermons, eliminated the use of kippot during worship, and instituted an egalitarian marriage ceremony in which both partners exchanged vows. These changes reflected his broader goal of removing practices he viewed as barriers to Jewish participation in American civic life.

Beyond liturgical reform, Hirsch promoted social engagement and community welfare.

In 1878, under Hirsch’s leadership, Keneseth Israel joined the Union of American Hebrew Congregations. In 1886, Hirsch was pressured by the congregation to retire. He subsequently moved to Chicago, where his son, Rabbi Emil G. Hirsch, led Chicago Sinai Congregation. Emil Hirsch was married to Mathilda Einhorn, daughter of Keneseth Israel’s first ordained rabbi, David Einhorn.

== American classical reform, 1887-1949 ==
=== Krauskopf ===
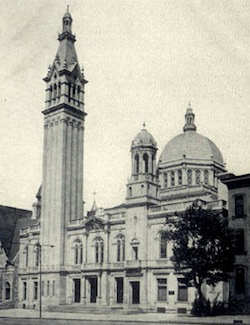
KI façade on the corner of Broad Street and Columbia Avenue (now Cecil B. Moore Avenue)

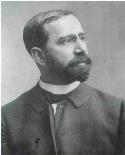
Rabbi Joseph Krauskopf (1858-1923)

Following the departure of Rabbi Samuel Hirsch, Keneseth Israel conducted a national search for a new rabbi and, in 1887, hired Rabbi Joseph Krauskopf of Kansas City. Krauskopf served as the congregation’s rabbi from 1887 until his death in 1923.

Before arriving in Philadelphia, Krauskopf was widely admired in Kansas City, where his public lectures attracted large audiences beyond the Jewish community and several were later published as books. Under his leadership, KI transitioned from usingGerman to English. He reinstated Sunday services (which had waned in the last years under Hirsch), established confirmation ceremonies at age sixteen, and discontinued the traditional bar mitzvah at age thirteen.

In 1892, Krauskopf founded a congregational library. He also encouraged the hiring of an assistant rabbi to serve the expanding membership. When Krauskopf began his tenure, Keneseth Israel had about 250 members; within several years, membership had risen to more than 400 families. That same year, the congregation dedicated a new synagogue building on North Broad Street with seating for 1,600 worshippers. By the early 1900s, membership exceeded 1,000 families, and the religious school enrolled more than 500 students, making Keneseth Israel one of the largest synagogues in the United States.

Throughout his ministry, Krauskopf delivered weekly Sunday lectures to large audiences, many of which were later distributed as pamphlets—more than a thousand in total during his career. Shortly after his arrival in Philadelphia, he helped found the Jewish Publication Society in 1888, with early institutional support from Keneseth Israel.

Krauskopf was an early visitor to Jewish agricultural settlements in Palestine and expressed support for Zionism as a means of resettling European Jews there. At the same time, he emphasized his belief in the full civic loyalty of American Jews and spoke frequently about patriotism and American identity. Krauskopf was friends with Theodore Roosevelt and following Roosevelt’s death, Krauskopf commissioned a large stained-glass window in his memory, which remains in the entrance foyer of Keneseth Israel’s Elkins Park synagogue.

During World War I, Krauskopf and the congregation organized programs for servicemen stationed in or passing through Philadelphia. In 1917, Assistant Rabbi James G. Heller took a leave of absence to serve as a U.S. Army chaplain.

In 1923, the congregation honored Krauskopf with the title of rabbi for life, at full salary. He died shortly after the appointment.

=== Fineshriber ===
Rabbi William H. Fineshriber served as senior rabbi of Keneseth Israel from 1923 to 1949. Following the death of Rabbi Joseph Krauskopf in June 1923, Associate Rabbi Abraham J. Feldman officiated while the congregation conducted a search for new leadership. Later that year, the synagogue appointed William H. Fineshriber, a graduate of the University of Cincinnati and Hebrew Union College, as senior rabbi.

Fineshriber’s tenure was marked by social engagement, public advocacy, and liturgical evolution. Continuing his record of social activism, he invited prominent public figures to address the congregation, including Margaret Sanger. He also conferred honorary membership on physicist Albert Einstein, who later spoke at Keneseth Israel’s 90th anniversary celebration. Nationally, Fineshriber participated in efforts to promote censorship and conservative moral standards in the film industry, working with Hollywood leaders to develop the Hays Code.

Reflecting the mainstream position of the Reform movement during the interwar period, Fineshriber supported Jewish emigration from Eastern Europe to Mandatory Palestine and opposed the establishment of a Jewish state. He maintained that Jews constituted a religious community rather than a nationality and affirmed the Reform movement’s stance—articulated by the Union of American Hebrew Congregations—of complete disassociation from Zionism.

During the 1930s, some members of Keneseth Israel, including Gil and Eleanor Kraus, participated in Holocaust rescue efforts, notably bringing at least fifty German-Jewish children to safety before the outbreak of World War II.

Fineshriber reinstated bar and bat mitzvah ceremonies, reintroduced Torah readings on Saturdays and during the High Holidays, restored the role of cantor, and incorporated string instruments such as violin and cello into services. During his tenure, the congregation adopted the Union Prayer Book, which replaced the Sunday service manual and hymnal created under Rabbi Krauskopf.

Malcolm H. Stern served as an assistant rabbi at Keneseth Israel in the 1940s.

== Neo-reform, 1949-2001 ==
=== Korn ===
Rabbi Bertram Korn served as senior rabbi of Keneseth Israel from 1949 until his death in 1979.

In the 1950s, under Korn’s leadership, Keneseth Israel undertook the process of relocating from its long-time synagogue on North Broad Street in Philadelphia to a new suburban campus in Elkins Park, Pennsylvania. In 1951, the congregation agreed to sell the Broad Street building and adjacent properties to Temple University. The move was completed in 1957, when the congregation dedicated its new synagogue complex in Elkins Park. The building incorporated many of the stained-glass windows from the Broad Street sanctuary. It also featured a new series of windows designed by artist Jacob Landau.

The relocation reflected broader postwar demographic shifts among American Jews, including suburbanization and white flight. As members became more geographically dispersed, Korn introduced radio broadcasts of Keneseth Israel services to enable members who could not travel to Elkins Park.

During the 1970s, Rabbi Korn led the congregation in supporting the Soviet Jewry movement.

In 1978, Korn announced plans to retire in 1980, but he died unexpectedly the following year. Membership peaked at 1,800 families under his tenure.

=== Maslin ===
Rabbi Simeon J. Maslin served as senior rabbi of Keneseth Israel from 1979 to 1997. During his tenure, Maslin was an influential voice in debates over rabbinic officiation at interfaith weddings—a topic that generated significant discussion and disagreement within Reform Judaism.

Maslin emphasized the preservation and revitalization of traditional ritual. He increased the use of Hebrew in worship services and reinstated the custom of men wearing kippot during prayer. A committed Zionist, he established the practice of sending confirmation classes to Israel. He was an outspoken critic of the State of Israel’s limited recognition of Reform Judaism.

Rabbi Maslin authored Gates of Mitzvah: Shaarei Mitzvah: A Guide to the Jewish Life Cycle (1986), a comprehensive guide to Jewish rituals and life-cycle events, and What We Believe ... What We Do ... A Pocket Guide for Reform Jews (1998).

In 1982–1983, the nearby Temple Judea congregation, also located in Elkins Park, merged with Keneseth Israel. Temple Judea maintained a museum that included Judaica, synagogue artifacts, historical materials, and photographs. Keneseth Israel had previously established its own museum in the early 1960s to house its art and ceremonial collections. In 1984, the two museums combined to form the Temple Judea Museum, incorporating the holdings of both congregations.

== 21st century ==
=== Sussman ===
Rabbi Lance J. Sussman

Lance J. Sussman has served as rabbi since 2001. He has participated in interfaith organizations in Philadelphia. Similar to Rabbis Krauskopf and Korn, Sussman was involved in the Soviet Jewry movement and later participated in initiatives engaging the Jewish community in Cuba. During his tenure, KI established youth exchange programs between KI teenagers and their counterparts in Germany.

== Notable members ==
- Elliot Abrams
- Arlin Adams, President of KI Congregation (1955-1957)
- Walter Hubert Annenberg
- Edward R. Becker
- Norman Fell
- Samuel S. Fleisher
- Gimbel Brothers, founders of the eponymous department store, and their associated families
- Albert M. Greenfield
- Guggenheim Family including Simon Guggenheim (1792-1869), Meyer, Benjamin, and Simon
- Joseph L. Kun
- William S. Paley
- Lessing Rosenwald
- Snellenburg family
- Horace Stern
- Andrew Weil, confirmed at KI in 1958
