= William E. Baldwin (politician) =

American politician

Member of the Pennsylvania House of Representatives from the 125th district
- In office 1983–1987
- Preceded by: William D. Hutchinson
- Succeeded by: Bob Allen

Personal details
- Born: March 6, 1948 (age 78) Pottsville, Pennsylvania
- Party: Democratic

William E. Baldwin (born March 6, 1948) is a former Democratic member of the Pennsylvania House of Representatives. He was elected to Court of Common Pleas of Schuylkill County on November 3, 1987.
