= William D. Hutchinson =

American judge (1932–1995)

Judge of the United States Court of Appeals for the Third Circuit
- In office August 6, 1987 – October 8, 1995
- Appointed by: Ronald Reagan
- Preceded by: Arlin Adams
- Succeeded by: Marjorie Rendell

Justice of the Pennsylvania Supreme Court
- In office 1982–1987

Member of the Pennsylvania House of Representatives from the 125th district
- In office January 3, 1973 – January 4, 1982
- Preceded by: Joseph Manbeck
- Succeeded by: William E. Baldwin

Personal details
- Born: June 20, 1932 Minersville, Pennsylvania, U.S.
- Died: October 8, 1995 (aged 63) Baltimore, Maryland, U.S.
- Party: Republican
- Education: Moravian College (BA); Harvard University (JD)

William David Hutchinson (June 20, 1932 – October 8, 1995) was a United States circuit judge of the United States Court of Appeals for the Third Circuit and a Republican politician from Pennsylvania.

== Education and career ==
William was born in Minersville, Pennsylvania, graduating as valedictorian from Minersville High School. He received a Bachelor of Arts degree from Moravian College in 1954. He received a Juris Doctor from Harvard Law School in 1957. He was in private practice of law in Pottsville, Pennsylvania from 1958 to 1981. He was an assistant district attorney of Schuylkill County, Pennsylvania from 1963 to 1968. He was a county solicitor for Schuylkill County from 1969 to 1972. He was a Member of the Pennsylvania House of Representatives from 1972 to 1982, serving four terms. He was a justice of the Pennsylvania Supreme Court from 1982 to 1987.

== Federal judicial service ==
William was nominated by President Ronald Reagan on June 26, 1987, to a seat on the United States Court of Appeals for the Third Circuit vacated by Judge Arlin Adams. He was confirmed by the United States Senate on August 5, 1987, and received commission on August 6, 1987. His service was terminated on October 8, 1995, due to death.

== Death ==
William died of cancer on October 8, 1995, at the Johns Hopkins Medical Center in Baltimore, Maryland.

Legal offices
Preceded by Arlin Adams	Judge of the United States Court of Appeals for the Third Circuit; 1987–1995	Succeeded by Marjorie Rendell
