= Schuylkill Haven High School =

Location
- 501 East Main Street; Schuylkill Haven, Pennsylvania, U.S. 17972; United States
- Coordinates: 40.6340°N 76.1718°W

Information
- Type: Public high school
- School district: Schuylkill Haven Area School District
- NCES School ID: 422091005264
- Principal: Ty Wartman
- Faculty: 35.5 (on an FTE basis)
- Grades: 8–12
- Enrollment: 455 (2024–25)
- Student to teacher ratio: 12.82
- Language: English
- Colors: Blue and gold
- Mascot: Hurricanes
- Website: www.shasd.org/o/hs

Schuylkill Haven High School is a small rural public high school located in Schuylkill Haven, Pennsylvania. It is the sole high school operated by Schuylkill Haven Area School District. As of the 2023–2024 school year, enrollment was 455 students in eighth through twelfth grades with 35.5 teachers on a full-time equivalent employment basis for a student-teacher ratio of 12.82, according to National Center for Education Statistics data.

Schuylkill Haven High School students may choose to attend the Schuylkill Technology Center for training in: practical nursing; the construction and mechanical trades, as well as other careers. The Schuylkill Intermediate Unit IU29 provides the school with a wide variety of services, including specialized education for disabled students, state mandated training on recognizing and reporting child abuse, speech and visual disability services, and criminal background check processing for prospective employees and professional development for staff and faculty, but Schuylkill Haven does not participate in its online credit recovery program.

== Extracurriculars ==
Schuylkill Haven Area School District offers a wide variety of clubs, activities and sports teams. The district operates an indoor swimming pool and has had an artificial turf football field since 2006.

=== Athletics ===
Varsity

Boys

- Baseball - AA
- Basketball - AA
- Cross country - A
- Football - AA
- Soccer - A
- Swimming and diving - AA
- Track and field - AA
- Wrestling - AA

Girls

- Basketball - AAA
- Cross country - A
- Soccer - A
- Softball - AA
- Swimming and diving - AA
- Track and field - AA
- Volleyball - AA

According to PIAA directory July 2016
