= Schuylkill Haven, Pennsylvania =

Borough in Pennsylvania, US

- Borough
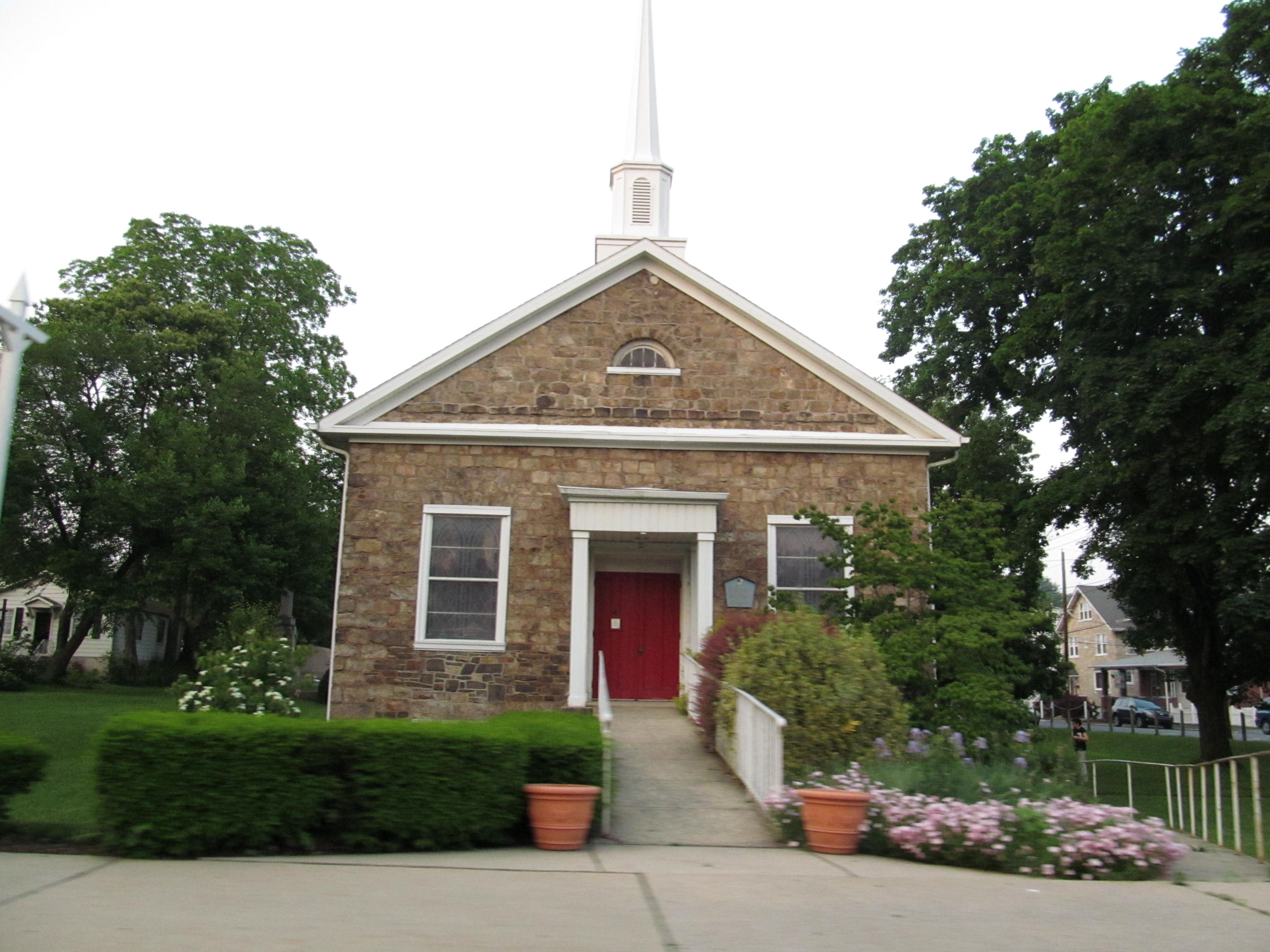
- St. James Episcopal Church, May 2012

- Flag Seal
- Nickname: "The Little Town That Could"
- Location of Schuylkill Haven in Schuylkill County, Pennsylvania (left) and of Schuylkill County in Pennsylvania (right)

- Location of Schuylkill Haven in Pennsylvania Schuylkill Haven (the United States)
- Coordinates: 40°37′41″N 76°10′21″W
- Country: United States
- State: Pennsylvania
- County: Schuylkill
- Settled: 1750
- Incorporated: June 11, 1840

Government
  - Type: Mayor and Borough Council
  - Mayor: John Williams (D)

Area
  - Total: 1.41 sq mi (3.64 km^{2})
  - Land: 1.40 sq mi (3.62 km^{2})
  - Water: 0.0039 sq mi (0.01 km^{2})
- Elevation: 526 ft (160 m)

Population (2020)
  - Total: 5,236
  - Density: 3,745.2/sq mi (1,446.03/km^{2})
- Time zone: UTC-5 (Eastern (EST))
  - Summer (DST): UTC-4 (EDT)
- Zip Code: 17972
- Area codes: 570 and 272
- FIPS code: 42-68312
- Website: http://www.schuylkillhaven.org

Schuylkill Haven (/ˈskuːlkɪl/, locally /-kəl/) is a borough in Schuylkill County, Pennsylvania, United States. The borough's population was 5,253 as of the 2020 census. Schuylkill Haven is situated along the Schuylkill River, for which it is named. Schuylkill Haven is a focal point of activity in southern Schuylkill County.

Schuylkill Haven is located 43.4 miles (69.8 km) west of Allentown, 92.6 miles (149.0 km) northwest of Philadelphia, and 131 miles (211 km) west of New York City.

== History ==
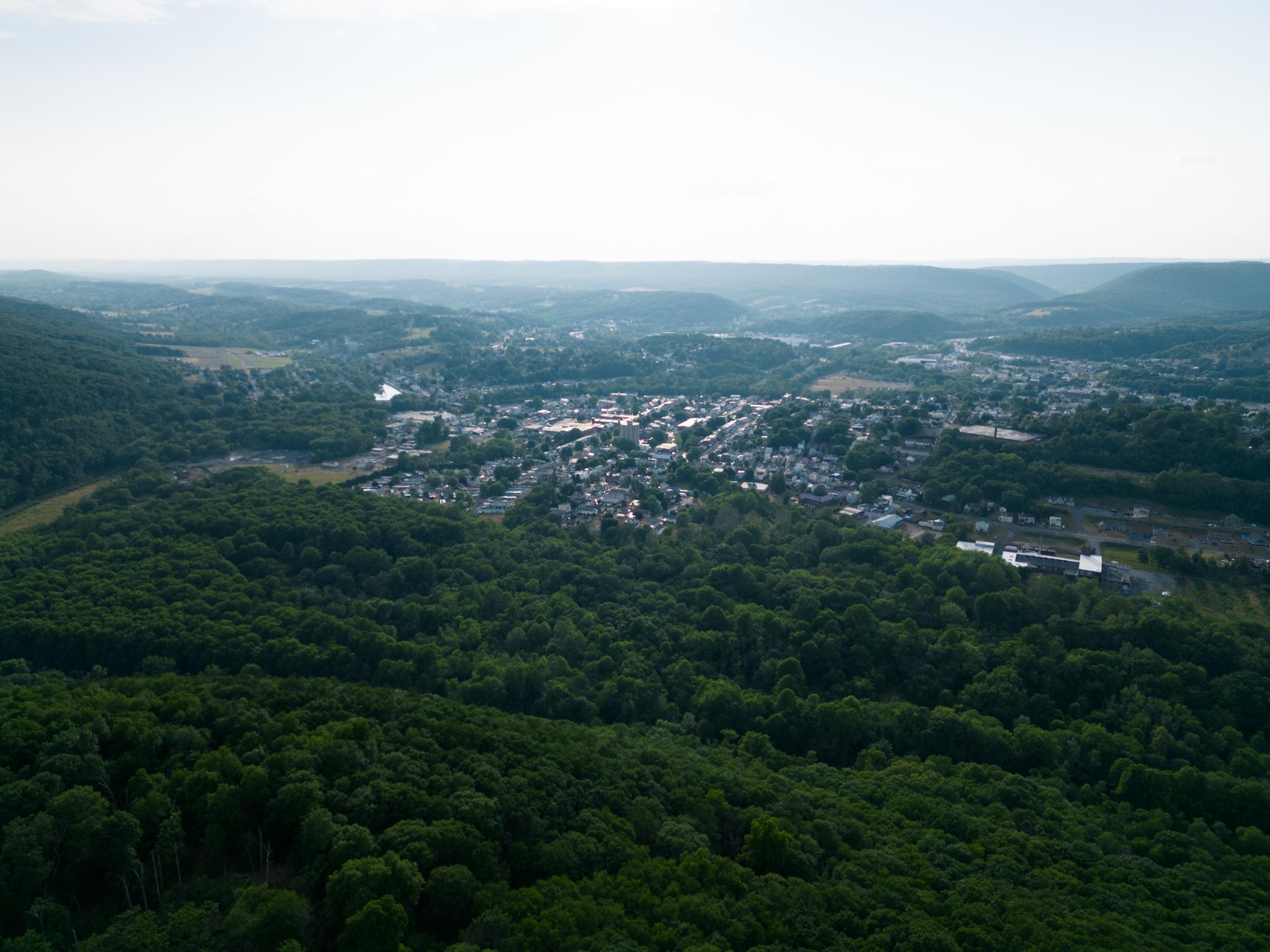
Aerial photograph of Schuylkill Haven and surrounding areas in June 2023

Before Europeans settled the land that is present-day Schuylkill Haven, the area was occupied by the Lenape Indian tribe, who were known as the Delaware Indians by the British.

The earliest European settlers arrived in the area of present-day Schuylkill Haven in the 1730s. They traveled north of Blue Mountain at the present-day Berks-Schuylkill County line at that time.

The first settler in Schuylkill Haven was John Fincher, a Quaker from Chester County, Pennsylvania, who received a land grant of 225 acres (0.91 km^{2}) on March 5, 1750, the day Schuylkill Haven considers its unofficial founding. Fincher constructed a house and barn near the Schuylkill River, and called his small settlement "Fincher's Ford."

The second known settler of Schuylkill Haven was Martin Dreibelbis, a German who arrived in the Spring of 1775. Martin Dreibelbis constructed a house, saw mill, distillery, and a grist mill on the eastern bank of the Schuylkill River. He later built a log house near present-day Main Street, giving Dreibelbis the title as Schuylkill Haven's "first resident". Dreibelbis willed his original plot of the town to his son, Jacob. Another son, Daniel, received an area east of the original plot, and a third son, George, received an area known as "Seven Stars", located north of Schuylkill Haven on the Schuylkill River.

The original plot of Schuylkill Haven shows that the borough stretched from the Schuylkill River on the west to present-day Main Street on the north, then known as Front Street, to Saint Peter Street on the east, then known as Jacob Street, and Liberty Street on the south. Present-day Columbia Street was initially the main residential district.

== Geography and climate ==
Schuylkill Haven was developed around the Schuylkill River, which flows through the town entering northwest of Island Park near Fritz Reed Avenue, and exits at the southeastern border. The river's elevation in the borough is approximately 490 feet (150 m) above sea level. Farther from the river, the borough extends up numerous hills, reaching its highest elevation at approximately 700 feet (210 m) above sea level near the top of Avenue C.

Schuylkill Haven receives an average of 47 inches (1,200 mm) of rain annually. The warmest month is typically July with an average high temperature of 84 °F (29 °C), and the coolest month is typically January with an average high of 36 °F (2 °C). The hardiness zone is now 7a. The borough has a hot-summer humid continental climate (Dfa) and average monthly temperatures range from 28.1 °F in January to 73.1 °F in July.

According to the U.S. Census Bureau, the borough has a total area of 1.4 square miles (3.6 km^{2}), all of which is land.

== Services and facilities ==
Schuylkill Haven provides electric, water, sewer, and refuse services to citizens of the borough. The borough owns and operates its own power distribution grid. Maintenance of the grid is provided by the borough's own line crew. The borough purchases electricity from AMP Ohio and Allegheny. The Tumbling Run Reservoir, located approximately five miles (8 km) north of the borough, is the Schuylkill Haven's primary source of water. Storage tanks at Willow Lake at the northern edge of the borough are an additional part of the borough's water facilities. Schuylkill Haven owns a second watershed located in Wayne Township with a small portion extending into Branch Township, known as the Panther Valley dam. This water supply is no longer used but the earthen dam still exists. Schuylkill Haven's sewage treatment plant is located at the southern edge of town, on the western side of St. Charles Street.

Schuylkill Haven's borough hall was once located in the Schuylkill Haven station on Main Street. In July 2015, however, it was moved to 333 Centre Avenue on PA Route 61.

Schuylkill Haven is served by its own police force. The Schuylkill Haven Police Department has eight officers, which provided service 24 hours a day, 7 days a week, with at least two officers typically on duty at all times. The police station and council chambers are headquartered on Parkway.

Schuylkill Haven has a volunteer fire department. The borough has three fire stations: The Rainbow Hose Co. (Station 1) on Dock Street, the Schuylkill Hose Co. (Station 2) at Union and St. Peter Streets, and the Liberty Fire Co. (Station 4) at Columbia and St. James Streets. Friendship Fire Co. (Station 3) was in close proximity to Rainbow, and was discontinued in the 19th century.

== Parks and recreation ==
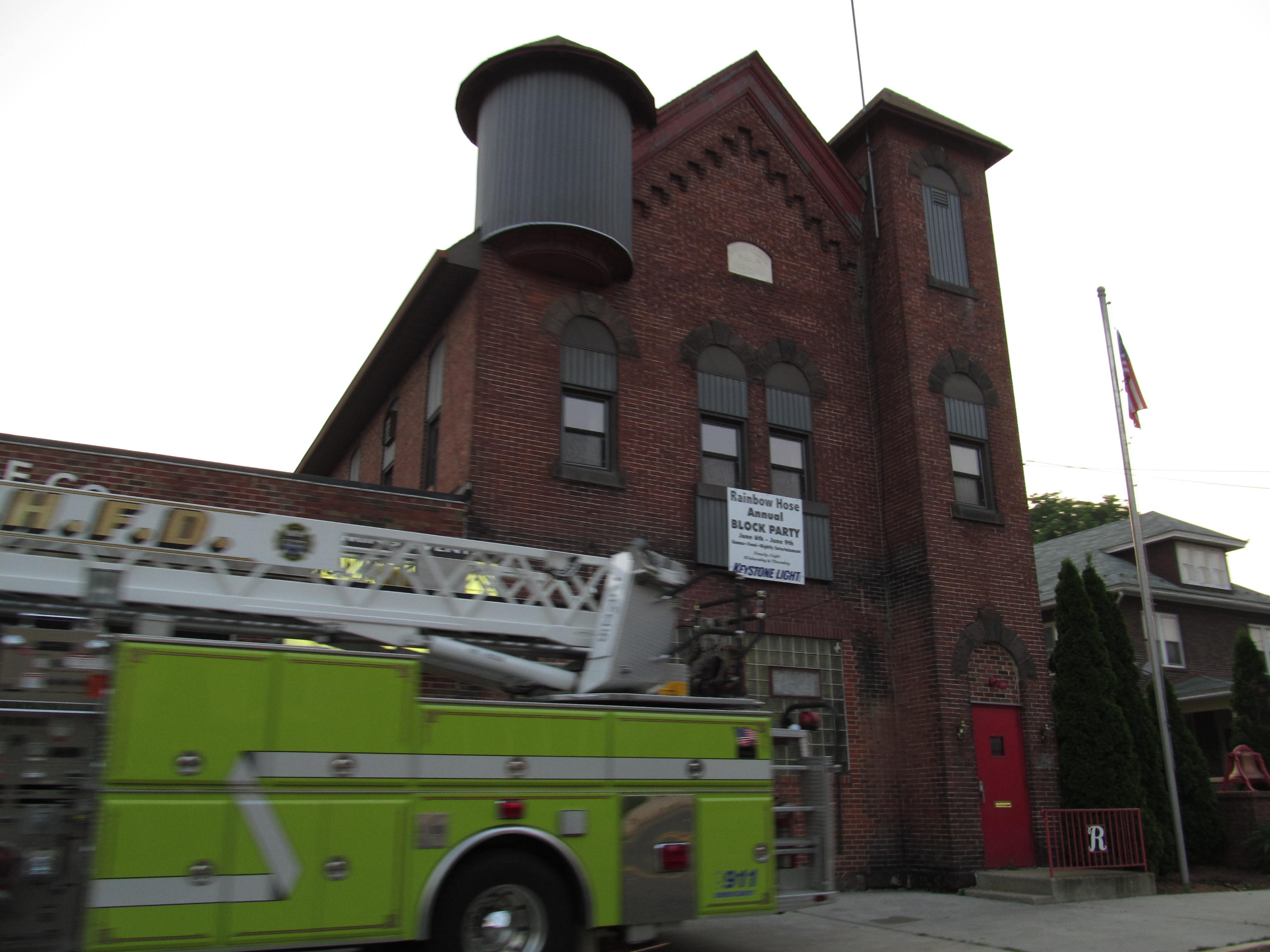
The Schuylkill Haven Fire Department in May 2012

Schuylkill Haven has several playgrounds and recreation areas, including Green Goose on Jackson Street west of Avenue A, Saylor Street playground on the western side of the borough, Naffin Avenue playground on Naffin Avenue northwest of the public school district's main athletic field, and Willow Street playground in the northwestern corner of the borough. Other children's play areas are on Garfield Avenue, North Berne Street, Williams Street, and Fritz Reed Avenue. On South Berne Street is an area known as "The Courts", which features a basketball court, picnic benches, and a gazebo.

Bubeck Park is located south of Columbia street near the Columbia Heights section of the borough. The park includes two pavilions, a bandstand, and a gazebo. Situated at the eastern edge of Bubeck Park is Stoyer's Dam, a man-made damn dedicated on May 20, 1984, and used for fishing and ice skating. The dam has numerous ducks, geese, and swans. The source of water for the dam is Long Run Creek, which enters on the western side of the dam after traveling along PA Route 443 from the Friedensburg area.

Island Park, located south of Fritz Reed Avenue between the Schuylkill River and the Reading Blue Mountain and Northern Railroad, is the latest addition to Schuylkill Haven's park system. Island park is the site of fireworks displays in the borough. The park also includes two baseball fields, several soccer fields, and a large pavilion. It is also the starting point of the Schuylkill County Sojurn", a kayaking trip down the Schuylkill River from Schuylkill Haven to Philadelphia.

The Community Center, also known as the Recreation Center or the Senior Center, is located at 340 Haven Street. Senior citizen events, biddy basketball, and internet access are available at the center. A gym and two rooms are available to rent for meetings, showers, and small parties. The center is handicap accessible.

The Walk In Art Center in Schuylkill Haven features 15 on-site artists and three art galleries and offers educational programs and community events.

== Religion ==
Schuylkill Haven has ten Protestant churches, a Catholic Church, and a Mandir, Vraj Hindu Temple, all located in Schuylkill Haven. The churches include:

- Bible Tabernacle Pentecostal Church, 35 South Margaretta Street
- Calvary United Pentecostal Church, 21 Dock Street
- Church of the Nazarene, 220 West Main Street
- Covenant United Methodist Church, 215 East Main Street
- First United Church of Christ, 110 Route 61 South (Center Avenue)
- First United Methodist Church, 420 Saylor Street
- Grace Evangelical Congregational Church, 15 Earl Stoyer Drive
- Jerusalem Evangelical Lutheran Church, 252 Dock Street
- St. Ambrose Roman Catholic Church, 201 Randel Street
- St. James Episcopal Church, 100 Dock Street
- St. John's United Church of Christ, 121 East Main Street

== Demographics ==
Historical population
Census	Pop.	Note	%±
1850	2,071		—
1860	2,927		41.3%
1870	2,940		0.4%
1880	3,052		3.8%
1890	3,088		1.2%
1900	3,654		18.3%
1910	4,747		29.9%
1920	5,437		14.5%
1930	6,514		19.8%
1940	6,518		0.1%
1950	6,597		1.2%
1960	6,470		−1.9%
1970	6,125		−5.3%
1980	5,977		−2.4%
1990	5,610		−6.1%
2000	5,548		−1.1%
2010	5,437		−2.0%
2020	5,236		−3.7%
2021 (est.)	5,258	▲	0.4%
U.S. Decennial Census

As of the 2010 census, there were 5,437 people, 2,330 Households, and 1,417 families residing in the borough. The racial makeup of the borough was 94.5% White, 2.1% Hispanic or Latino ancestry of any race, 2.5% Black or African American, 0.9% Asian, 1.3% were two or more races, 0.4% were some other race and 0.2% Native American. As of the 2020 census, the borough's population was 5,253.

== Government and politics ==
Schuylkill Haven is governed by a borough council and a mayor. There are seven borough council members. Both the mayor and council members are elected to a four-year term. There are no term limits for council members or the mayor. Borough council meetings are typically held on the first and third Wednesdays of each month in council chambers in the borough's police station at 250 Parkway. In addition to the council and the mayor, a borough administrator leads the municipality's daily operations from a borough office at 333 Center Avenue, which is part of PA Route 61.

Schuylkill Haven is in Pennsylvania's 9th congressional district, currently represented by U.S. Congressman Dan Meuser (R).

On the state level, it is in the 29th Pennsylvania Senate District represented by State Senator is Dave Argall (R) and the 125th Pennsylvania House of Representatives District, represented by Joseph Kerwin (R).

== Education ==
=== Primary and secondary education ===
Schuylkill Haven is in the Schuylkill Haven Area School District. Students in grades eight through twelve attend Schuylkill Haven High School. The district also maintains a middle school and an elementary school.

=== Colleges and universities ===
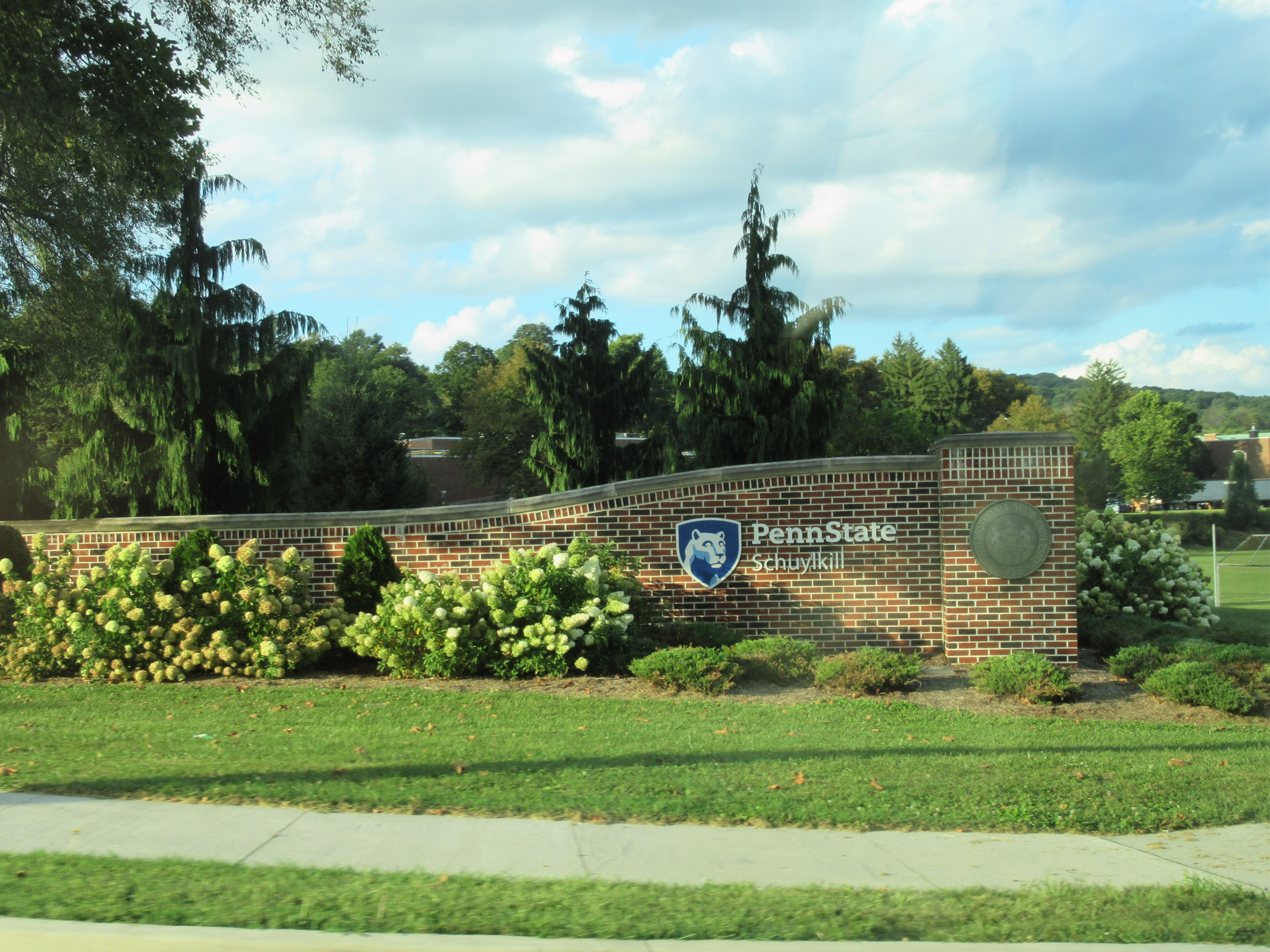
Entrance to Penn State Schuylkill in Schuylkill Haven in August 2018

Penn State Schuylkill, part of the Pennsylvania State University system, is located off PA Route 61 immediately northeast of the borough. It offers five associate degrees, and the opportunity to complete the first two years of 160 majors, and to matriculate to Penn State after these first two years.

=== Public library ===
Schuylkill Haven Free Public Library, located at 104 St. John Street at the intersection of St. John and Union Street, was dedicated on June 26, 1966. The library is open Monday through Saturday.

== Transportation ==
=== Highways and roads ===
Schuylkill Haven is served by two state highways, Pennsylvania Route 61 and Pennsylvania Route 443.

PA Route 61, a north–south highway, travels through the northern part of the borough. PA Route 61 operates as "Center Avenue" in Schuylkill Haven. The road continues north to Pottsville and ends in Sunbury; its southbound rout enters Berks County, Pennsylvania, where it ends in Reading.

PA Route 443 enters Schuylkill Haven at the western end of the borough, where it is known as Columbia Street. It continues on Parkway to Main Street until it enters Dock Street. PA Route 443 exits the town along with PA Route 61 on the northeastern side of the borough. PA Route 443 continues east toward Orwigsburg, and west toward Pine Grove.

Interstate 81 is accessible from PA Route 443 near Pine Grove. Interstate 78 is accessible nearby at Hamburg in Berks County from PA Route 61, which recently underwent a $65 million widening project.

=== Trains ===
Reading Blue Mountain and Northern Railroad's commercial train service traverses the borough on a single-track line with three grade crossings, at Williams Street, Union Street, and Main Street.

Passenger train service by SEPTA was available between Schuylkill Haven, Reading, and Philadelphia until July 1, 1981, when PennDOT withdrew its financial support for the project. Schuylkill Haven station is now owned and operated by Reading Blue Mountain and Northern Railroad.

=== Schuylkill Canal ===
The Schuylkill Canal, created by the Schuylkill Navigation Company, was incorporated into Schuylkill Haven's transportation system in 1825. The canal was built on the Schuylkill River as a means to transport anthracite coal and traveled from Philadelphia to Port Carbon. The canal turned Reading, Norristown, and Pottsville into manufacturing centers.

In 1841, the Philadelphia and Reading Railroad was founded. By 1845, it was transporting nearly three times as much coal than the Schuylkill Canal. The Schuylkill Navigation Company expanded their canals to accommodate for larger boats. But in 1869, the canals were damaged from flooding, and their use began declining. The railroads ultimately surpassed canals as the primary transportation for coal. In 1979, the canals were filled by the Commonwealth of Pennsylvania.

== Notable people ==
- Gavin Bartholomew, professional football player, Minnesota Vikings
- Allen Moyer, Broadway set designer
- Ralph Peters, non-fiction author, Red Army and The War in 2020
- Elsie Singmaster, former children's and young adult author
- Mike Tobash, former Pennsylvania State Representative
