= Vraj Hindu Temple =

Hindu temple in Pennsylvania, USA

Coordinates: 40.5553°N 76.2337°W

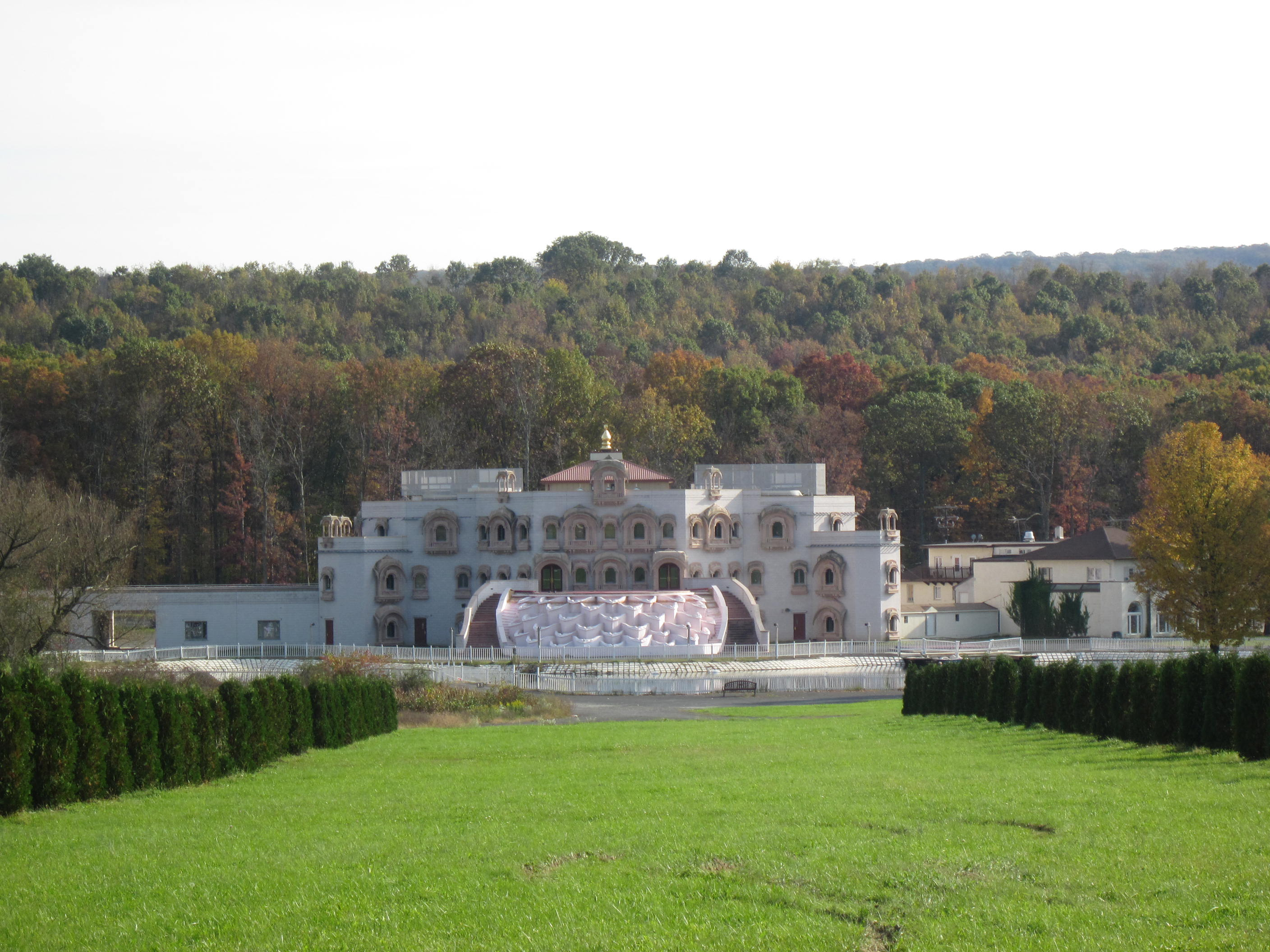
Vraj Hindu Temple in Schuylkill Haven, Pennsylvania in October 2011

The Vraj Hindu Temple is located in Schuylkill Haven, Pennsylvania. The temple is associated with the Pushtimarg Vaishnav sect.

== History ==
Before 1987, Vraj Hindu Temple was a yoga recreational center. The land was purchased in the summer of 1987 by the temple's visionary founder Govind Bhikhabhai Shah (Kaka) with support from 29 other investors. The temple became official in November 1988 during the inaugural Patotsav Celebration when it was claimed that Shrinathji appeared for the first time at Vraj.
