= Schuylkill Haven Area School District =

School district in Pennsylvania

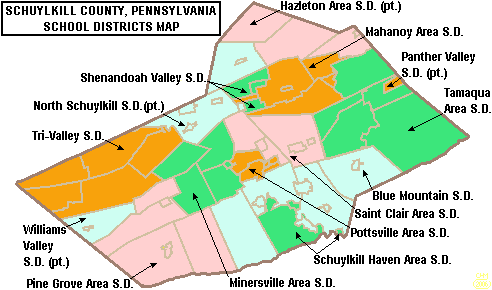
- Location of Schuylkill Haven Area School District in Schuylkill County, Pennsylvania

Address
- 501 East Main Street Schuylkill Haven, Schuylkill County, Pennsylvania, 17972; United States
- Coordinates: 40.632980°N 76.168541°W

District information
- Type: Public
- Schools: 3, including Schuylkill Haven High School
- Budget: $24.444 million
- NCES District ID: 4220910

Students and staff
- Students: 1,172 (2024-25)
- Teachers: 97.5 (on an FTE basis)
- Student–teacher ratio: 12.02
- Colors: Blue and Gold

Other information
- Website: www.haven.k12.pa.us

The Schuylkill Haven Area School District is a small public school district in Schuylkill County, Pennsylvania. It serves the municipalities of Port Clinton, Landingville, Schuylkill Haven, and South Manheim Township.

Schuylkill Haven Area School District encompasses approximately 55 square miles (140 km^{2}). According to 2000 U.S. census data, it served a resident population of 8,202. By 2010, the district's population increased to 8,412 people. The educational attainment levels for the Schuylkill Haven Area School District population (25 years old and over) were 84.8% high school graduates and 15.8% college graduates. The district is one of the 500 public school districts of Pennsylvania and one of fourteen (14) public school districts in Schuylkill County in 2016.

As of the 2024-25 school year, the school district has a student population of 1,172 and 97.5 teachers on a full-time equivalent basis for a student-teacher ratio of 12.02, according to National Center for Education Statistics.

According to the Pennsylvania Budget and Policy Center, 37.7% of the district's pupils lived at 185% or below the Federal Poverty Level as shown by their eligibility for the federal free or reduced price school meal programs in 2012. In 2009, the district residents' per capita income was $17,511, while the median family income was $43,737. In the Commonwealth, the median family income was $49,501 and the United States median family income was $49,445, in 2010. In Schuylkill County, the median household income was $45,012. By 2013, the median household income in the United States rose to $52,100. In 2014, the median household income in the USA was $53,700.

== Schools ==
Schuylkill Haven Area School District operates one high school, Schuylkill Haven High School, one middle school, and one elementary school. High school students may choose to attend the Schuylkill Technology Center for training in the construction and mechanical trades, as well as other careers.

The Schuylkill Intermediate Unit IU29 provides the district with a wide variety of services, including specialized education for disabled students, state-mandated training on recognizing and reporting child abuse, speech and visual disability services, and criminal background check processing for prospective employees and professional development for staff and faculty.
