= Pennsylvania House of Representatives, District 125 =

American legislative district

Pennsylvania's 125th State House of Representatives district
Representative
| Joseph Kerwin; R–Lykens |

The 125th Pennsylvania House of Representatives District is located in Dauphin County and includes the following areas:

- Dauphin County
  - Berrysburg
  - Dauphin
  - Elizabethville
  - Gratz
  - Halifax
  - Jackson Township
  - Jefferson Township
  - Lower Paxton Township (part)
  - Lykens
  - Lykens Township
  - Middle Paxton Township
  - Mifflin Township
  - Millersburg
  - Pillow
  - Reed Township
  - Rush Township
  - Upper Paxton Township
  - Washington Township
  - Wayne Township
  - West Hanover Township
  - Wiconisco Township
  - Williamstown
  - Williams Township

== Representatives ==
| Representative | Party | Years | District home | Note |
Prior to 1969, seats were apportioned by county.
| Joseph H. Manbeck | Republican | 1969 – 1972 | | |
| William D. Hutchinson | Republican | 1973 – 1982 | | Resigned on January 4, 1982 to join Pennsylvania Supreme Court |
| William E. Baldwin | Democrat | 1983 – 1987 | | Elected to Court of Common Pleas on November 3, 1987 |
| Bob Allen | Republican | 1989 – 2006 | | Defeated in Republican primary |
| Tim Seip | Democrat | 2007 – 2010 | Washington Township | Defeated in general election |
| Mike Tobash | Republican | 2011 – 2020 | | |
| Joseph Kerwin | Republican | 2020 – present | Lykens | |
