= Gerald Ford Supreme Court candidates =

During his time in office, President Gerald Ford made one appointment to the Supreme Court of the United States. Ford nominated John Paul Stevens to replace Associate Justice William O. Douglas, whom Ford had unsuccessfully attempted to initiate impeachment proceedings against as a congressman.

In December 1974, the 76-year-old Douglas suffered a stroke while vacationing in Nassau, Bahamas, that paralyzed his left arm and leg. Douglas was discharged from Walter Reed Army Medical Center in March 1975, and was in and out of the hospital for the remainder of the 1974–1975 term. Although Chief Justice Warren E. Burger urged Douglas to retire, Douglas showed no intention of doing so. However, Douglas’ condition continued to deteriorate, and on October 28, 1975, his doctors told him his condition would never improve and that he would be paralyzed and in near-constant pain for the rest of his life. On November 12, 1975, Douglas announced that he would immediately retire and assume senior status. On November 28, 1975, Ford nominated John Paul Stevens to replace Douglas. Stevens was confirmed by the United States Senate on December 17, 1975.

== Politics ==
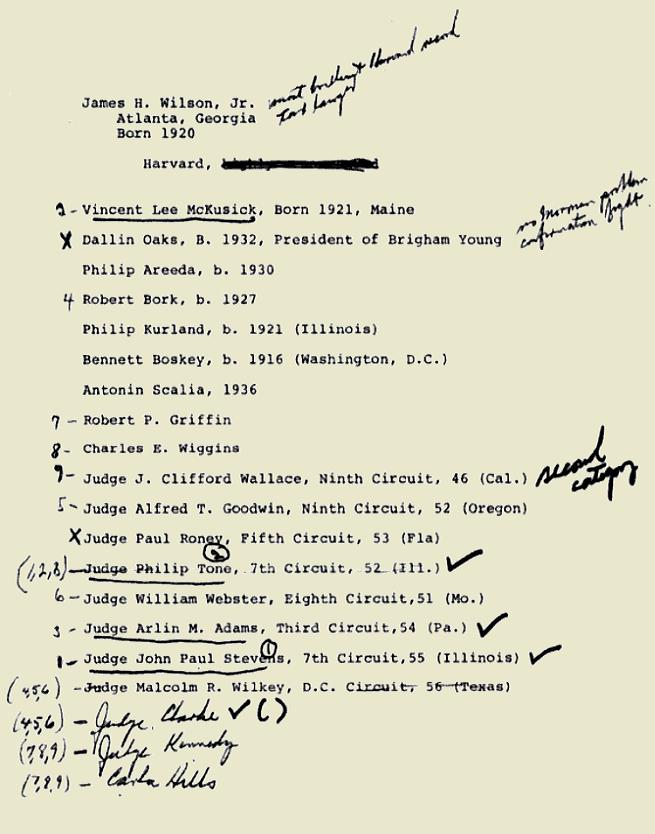
Handwritten notes by President Ford on the list provided by Attorney General Edward Levi.

Ford, who had been appointed to the Vice Presidency after Nixon’s second term began, and who assumed the Presidency without having sought the office, did not articulate a philosophy for the kind of justices he would like to appoint to the Supreme Court, the way subsequent presidents did. It is significant that Ford involved himself less in the earlier stages of the process of identifying candidates for the court than some later presidents did; when the Douglas vacancy arose, he essentially left the decision up to his attorney general, Edward H. Levi. At the same time, one of Ford’s reasons for attempting as a congressman to impeach Douglas in 1970 involved what Ford called Douglas’ “liberal opinions.”

=== John Paul Stevens nomination ===
After Douglas announced his retirement on November 12, 1975, Ford asked attorney general Edward Levi to draw up a list of potential candidates. Ford was under pressure from Democrats in Congress to replace Douglas with another liberal, but at the same time, he was under similar pressure from Republicans to name a conservative. Ford handed Levi the task of narrowing down the list of candidates to a manageable number, and Levi then gave Ford a list of eighteen candidates, grouped into four categories based on Levi’s impressions of them. Ford annotated the list and ranked the contenders, narrowing the list to “five or six names,” Ford later wrote. The list included United States Solicitor General Robert Bork, United States Court of Appeals for the Seventh Circuit judge John Paul Stevens, United States Court of Appeals for the Sixth Circuit judge Cornelia Groefsema Kennedy, United States Secretary of Housing and Urban Development Carla Anderson Hills, and United States Court of Appeals for the Third Circuit judge Arlin Adams.

Bork wound up being disqualified because of his close ties to Nixon, while Adams was considered to be a solid conservative without Bork’s associations, but flashy and overly self-confident. Levi pushed for Stevens, a fellow Chicago native. Ford debated between his final two contenders, Stevens and Adams. “Both had received excellent ratings from the American Bar Association; both had had distinguished careers,” Ford later wrote. “I pored over their legal opinions myself. Stevens’ opinions were concise, persuasive and legally sound. It was a close call, but after talking to Levi and (White House Counsel Philip) Buchen, I selected Stevens in December.”

Despite Ford’s statement in his autobiography that he had selected Stevens in December, Ford actually formally nominated Stevens to the Supreme Court on November 28, 1975. The Senate confirmed Stevens in a 98–0 vote on December 17, 1975. Senators James Allen (D-AL) and Birch Bayh (D-IN) did not vote.

== Names frequently mentioned ==
Following is a list of individuals who were mentioned in various news accounts and books as having been considered by Ford for a Supreme Court appointment:

=== United States courts of appeals ===

- Court of Appeals for the Third Circuit
  - Arlin Adams (1921–2015)
- Court of Appeals for the Fifth Circuit
  - Charles Clark (1925–2011)
- Court of Appeals for the Seventh Circuit
  - John Paul Stevens (1920–2019) (nominated and confirmed)
  - Philip Willis Tone (1923–2001)
- Court of Appeals for the Eighth Circuit
  - William H. Webster (1924–2025)
- Court of Appeals for the Ninth Circuit
  - Alfred T. Goodwin (1923–2022)
  - J. Clifford Wallace (born 1928)
- Court of Appeals for the D.C. Circuit
  - Malcolm Richard Wilkey (1918–2009)

=== United States district court judges ===
- Cornelia Groefsema Kennedy – United States District Court for the Eastern District of Michigan (1923–2014)

=== State supreme courts ===
- Mary S. Coleman – Chief Justice, Michigan Supreme Court (1914–2001)

=== United States senators ===
- Robert P. Griffin (1923–2015) – Michigan

=== United States representatives ===
- Charles E. Wiggins (1927–2000) – California

=== Executive branch officials ===
- Robert Bork (1927–2012) – United States Solicitor General under Nixon and Ford (nominated by Ronald Reagan in 1987, but rejected)
- Carla Anderson Hills (born 1934) – United States Secretary of Housing and Urban Development under Ford, former United States Assistant Attorney General under Presidents Nixon and Ford

=== Other backgrounds ===
- Vincent L. McKusick (1921–2014), private attorney
- Dallin H. Oaks (born 1932), President of Brigham Young University

== See also ==
- United States federal judge
- Judicial appointment history for United States federal courts
