= Bertram Korn =

American historian and rabbi (1918–1979)

Bertram Wallace Korn Sr. (6 October 1918 – 1979) was an American historian and rabbi, who served in the United States Navy Chaplain Corps during World War II. Serving with the US Naval Reserve after the war, in 1975, he was promoted to Rear Admiral in the Chaplain Corps, the first Jewish chaplain to receive flag rank in any of the United States armed forces.

From 1949 to 1979 Korn was Senior Rabbi at Reform Congregation Keneseth Israel in Philadelphia, Pennsylvania. During this period, he also wrote and published twelve books, primarily about Jewish history in the United States, with several books related to the history of Jews in the South.

== Biography ==
Bertram Wallace Korn was born on in 1918 to Manuel and Blanche (née Bergman) Korn in Philadelphia, Pennsylvania. He attended the University of Pennsylvania and Cornell University before graduating from the University of Cincinnati in 1936 with a BA in history.

He was determined to be a rabbi and in 1943 he received an M.H.L. degree from the Hebrew Union College–Jewish Institute of Religion in Cincinnati, the center of Reform Judaism in the United States. He was ordained as a Reform rabbi in that city. He returned late for more graduate work, earning a D.H.L. degree from the college-Institute in 1949.

In 1944, Korn enlisted in the United States Navy and was commissioned as a lieutenant in the United States Navy Chaplain Corps. He was assigned to China with the 1st and 6th Marine Divisions. He continued his association through the US Naval Reserve after the war. In 1975, he was promoted to Rear Admiral in the Chaplain Corps, U.S. Naval Reserve, the first Jewish chaplain to receive flag rank in any of the United States armed forces.

After returning to civilian life, from 1949 to his death in 1979, Korn served as the Senior Rabbi at Reform Congregation Keneseth Israel (KI) in Philadelphia, Pennsylvania. In 1957, under Rabbi Korn's leadership, KI moved from its Broad Street location downtown to a new building at the current address on Old York Road in Elkins Park, Pennsylvania. Many of its members had moved to the suburbs in the postwar transformation of the United States.

== Historian ==
Korn wrote twelve books on American Jewish history, the most famous being American Jewry and the Civil War, (1951). In 1962 he was named visiting professor of American Jewish history at the New York campus of Hebrew Union College-Jewish Institute of Religion; in 1970 he was named to the same position at Dropsie University in Philadelphia. He also served for a period as president of the American Historical Society. Several of his books explored Jewish history in the American South.

Other works by Korn include:

- Eventful Years and Experiences, Studies in Nineteenth Century American Jewish History. Cincinnati: American Jewish Archives. 1954.
- The American Reaction to the Mortara Case: 1858–1859 (1957)
- "Benjamin Levy: New Orleans Printer and Publisher", The Papers of the Bibliographical Society of America 54, no. 4 (Fourth Quarter, 1960); doi:10.1086/pbsa.54.4.24299526
- Jews and Negro Slavery in the Old South, 1789–1865, 1961, Presidential address to American Jewish Historical Society, full text online at Archive.org
- The Early Jews of New Orleans (1969)
- "The Jews of Mobile, Alabama, Prior to the First Congregation, in 1841", Hebrew Union College Annual Vol. 40/41 (1969–1970), pp. 469–502
- The Jews of Mobile, Alabama, 1763–1841, Hebrew Union College Press, 1970, 63 pages

== Personal life ==
Korn married and had two children, Judith Carole and Bertram Wallace Korn Jr.

Rabbi Korn is buried in Arlington National Cemetery Section 2, Grave 186-LH.

== Legacy ==
His papers are held by the American Jewish Archives.
