= Joseph Krauskopf =

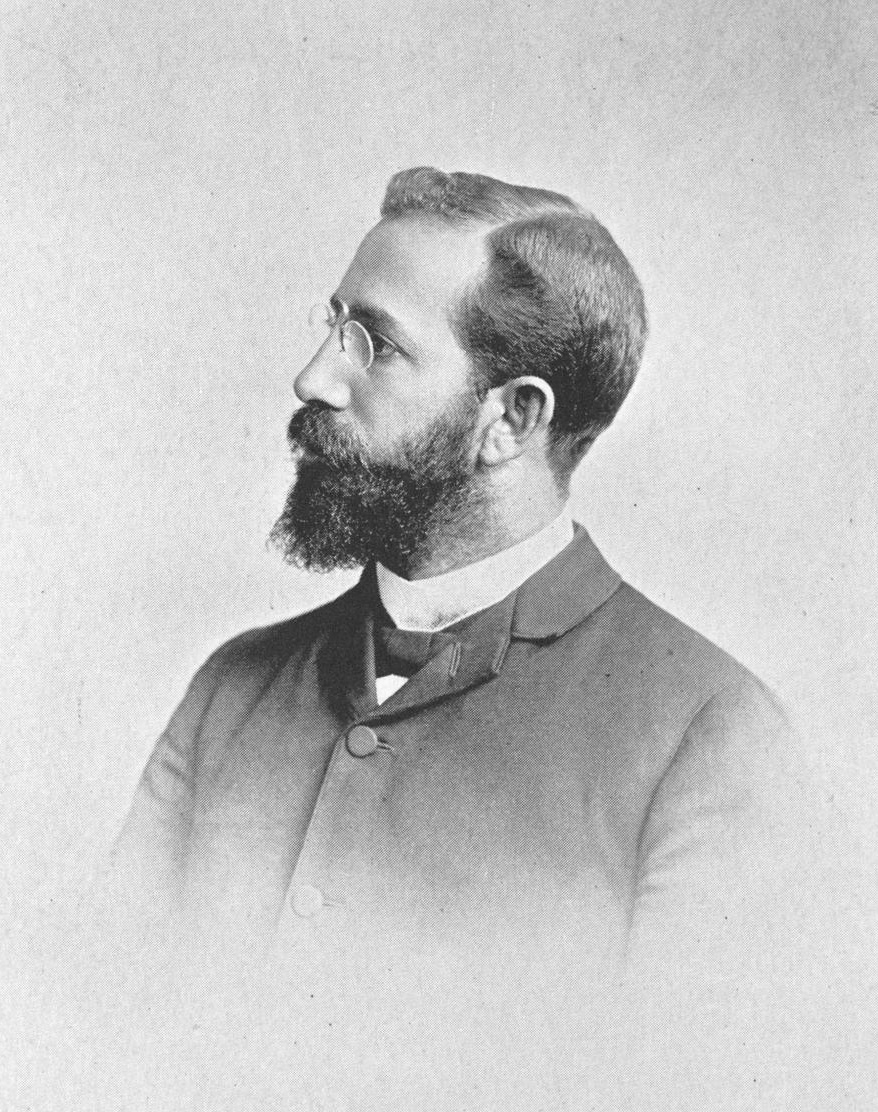
- Born: January 21, 1858; Ostrowo, Prussia
- Died: June 12, 1923 (aged 65); Atlantic City, New Jersey
- Occupations: Rabbi, author

Joseph Krauskopf (January 21, 1858 – June 12, 1923) was a prominent American Jewish rabbi, author, leader of Reform Judaism, founder of the National Farm School (now Delaware Valley University), and long-time (1887–1923) rabbi at Reform Congregation Keneseth Israel (KI), the oldest reform synagogue in Philadelphia which under Krauskopf, became the largest reform congregation in the nation.

== Early life ==
Joseph Krauskopf was born in Ostrowo, Prussia, on January 21, 1858. In July 1872, at the age of fourteen, Krauskopf emigrated to the United States, expecting to join his older brother, Manaseh, in New Jersey. His brother was murdered just as Krauskopf arrived in the United States and instead he went to Fall River, Massachusetts, where he had cousins. There he found employment as clerk in a tea-store. While not denying or renouncing his own faith, he attended the local Unitarian Church (there was no Jewish congregation in the city), and became a protégé of Mrs. Mary Bridges Canedy Slade, who was the assistant editor the New England Journal of Education, a well-known author and composer, and the wife of the principal of the local high school, Albion Slade. Mrs. Slade directed Krauskopf's self-education, as he could not afford to quit work to attend school. In 1875 Mrs. Slade recommended him to Isaac Mayer Wise who was organizing the first rabbinical class at the newly founded Hebrew Union College in Cincinnati, Ohio. Rabbi Wise probably respected Slade's recommendation because she was a prominent hymnist and author of children's literature. Also writing a letter of recommendation for Krauskopf was William Reed, the editor of the Fall River Daily Evening News. Thus, through the intervention of this devoutly Christian woman, Krauskopf went to rabbinical school.

== Rabbinical education and early career ==
Krauskopf arrived in Cincinnati in 1875 to be part of the first class at Hebrew Union College. This was Krauskopf's first opportunity to enter a program of formal education since arriving in the United States three years earlier at the age of fourteen. Krauskopf spent the next eight years at Hebrew Union College. In this time, he earned a high school degree, a bachelor's degree from the University of Cincinnati, and finally rabbinical ordination from Hebrew Union College in 1883. Therefore, in Cincinnati, he effectively went to high school, college, and rabbinical school simultaneously. While studying at Hebrew Union and at the University of Cincinnati, Krauskopf earned money as a tutor, contributed articles to journals, and published and marketed (with his future brother-in-law, Henry Berkowitz) the Union Hebrew Reader (1881, commonly known as the First Union Hebrew Reader), the Second Union Hebrew Reader (1884), and Bible Ethics: A Manual of Instruction in the History and Principles of Judaism, According to Hebrew Scriptures (1884) (full text). A contemporary journal, which focused on the study of Hebrew language and literature, praised the first Union Hebrew Reader (which sold for 25 cents) for providing ordered lessons that would "lead to the needed familiarity with the Hebrew page." In 1899 both of his Hebrew readers were being sold through the "Educational Catalogue for 1899" advertised in the publishing industry trade journal, Bookseller, Newsdealer, and Stationer.

While studying for his ordination, Krauskopf served as a student rabbi in Peoria, Illinois, and in Kalamazoo, Michigan. After his ordination, he became the rabbi at Congregation B'nai Jehudah in Kansas City, Missouri. Two years later, in 1885, he finished work on his graduate degree and earned a Doctor of Divinity from Hebrew Union College.

In Kansas City, Krauskopf was enormously popular within his synagogue and the larger urban community. He gave widely attended public lectures, some of which were later published as books. Additionally, he was involved in a wide range of civic activities. The governor of Missouri made him a life-member of the board of what was then known as the National Conference of Charities and Correction. In 1885 he was instrumental in organizing a convention of reform Rabbis in Pittsburgh. Although only two years out of rabbinical school, he was elected vice-president of the Pittsburgh Conference, of which Isaac Mayer Wise was president. This conference wrote the Pittsburgh Platform, which became the defining statement of Reform Judaism at that time. In July 1887 Krauskopf accepted an offer from Reform Congregation Keneseth Israel of Philadelphia. His Kansas City congregation tried to prevent him from leaving, and even state and local politicians pressured him to reject the offer from KI. A delegation from Kansas City failed in its attempt to get KI to release Krauskopf from his contract. All of this caused some embarrassment and delayed his move, but he finally left for Philadelphia in late October.

== Career at Keneseth Israel ==
Krauskopf was formally installed at Reform Congregation Keneseth Israel (KI) on October 23, 1887. Once in Philadelphia, Krauskopf quickly established himself as a leading figure in both the Jewish and non-Jewish communities. Krauskopf's congregation was almost entirely made up of Jews from Germany and other parts of central Europe. From the beginning of KI (in 1847) services and board meetings had always been conducted in German. Krauskopf was from Germany and spoke fluent German. Nevertheless, he transformed KI into an English speaking and thoroughly Americanized house of worship. For example, while continuing to hold religious services on Saturday, the Jewish Sabbath, Krauskopf also established a Sunday service which followed the traditions of American Protestantism. These Sunday services were more educational than religious, with Krauskopf giving sermons or lectures that lasted more than an hour. He spoke on theology, religion, ethics, social science, natural science and current events. A talented and popular speaker, he drew as many as 1,000 listeners to his Sunday services, including non-members and non-Jews who came to hear him speak. Krauskopf published these sermons and lectures as pamphlets which sold briskly. Under Krauskopf, KI flourished and became the largest reform Jewish congregation in the United States. Following the intellectual lead of his teacher, Isaac Mayer Wise, he was committed to the study of Jewish-Christian relations and even attempted to reclaim the apostle Paul as a model for Judaism. He worked closely with Catholic and Protestant leaders in Philadelphia, and was a force for ethnic and religious pluralism. On a national level, he helped organize the Jewish Publication Society of America, in 1888.

Krauskopf's congregation was almost entirely made up of German Jews. However, at this time, the American Jewish world was being transformed by massive immigration from Russia, Poland, and other parts of Eastern Europe. In 1894 Krauskopf visited Russia to investigate the condition of Jews in that notoriously anti-Semitic nation. Initially the Russian government refused to give him a visa, simply because he was Jewish. This led to a resolution in Congress, proposed by Representative Isidor Rayner of Maryland, urging the United States to abrogate the existing treaty with Russia. Congressman Rayner argued that if an American citizen could not freely travel in a country (Russia), then the United States should not maintain a treaty of friendship with that country. Krauskopf was uncomfortable with this publicity, but later admitted it probably led to Russia finally granting him a visa. While in Russia, Krauskopf gained a first hand look at the condition of the Jews within the Pale of Settlement. Krauskopf met with American diplomats, Russian political leaders and various intellectuals including Leo Tolstoy, best known as the author of War and Peace (1869) and Anna Karenina (1877). Tolstoy told Krauskopf that the Jews had no future in Russia. At Tolstoy's suggestion, Krauskopf visited Jewish agricultural colonies in the Russian Empire and the Jewish Agricultural School at Odessa. On his return he worked to establish a similar institution outside of Philadelphia, believing that it would attract Jews from Russia and help provide them with an education to begin a new life in the United States. By 1895, Krauskopf had raised enough money to start a school, which was established in 1896 as the National Farm School in Doylestown, Pennsylvania. The school was non-sectarian, and indeed non-religious, but most of the early students were Jewish. Support came from private donations, state funds, and the Federation of Jewish Charities of Philadelphia. Krauskopf served as the first president of the institution, which is now Delaware Valley University. Krauskopf spent a great deal of time raising money for the school, and in 1905 led a capital campaign that raised $50,000 (about $1.5 million in 2015), including a $12,500 donation from Andrew Carnegie.

When Krauskopf came to KI, the congregation had 250 member families. Within a few years it had over 400 member families. By 1892 the Congregation had moved to a newly constructed impressive building on Broad Street with seating in the sanctuary for over 1600 people. A year later the Congregation hired an assistant rabbi to work under Krauskopf. By 1900, KI's religious school had over 500 students. Under Krauskopf KI abolished the traditional Bar Mittzvah for thirteen-year-old boys and replaced it with a confirmation for boys and girls at age sixteen or seventeen.

Shortly after the outbreak of the Spanish–American War in 1898, Krauskopf became a leader of the National Relief Commission, and was one of three special field commissioners to visit army camps of the United States and Cuba. Almost immediately after he arrived in Cuba, Krauskopf contacted the Jewish philanthropist Nathan Strauss, persuading him to donate an ice factory to support the needs of American troops in Cuba. Two weeks later the entire ice plant was shipped to Santiago, Cuba. In Cuba, Krauskopf became friends with Col. Theodore Roosevelt and conducted services for the eight Jewish soldiers in Roosevelt's Rough Riders (the First United States Volunteer Cavalry). Krauskopf and Roosevelt would remain friends and when Roosevelt died Krauskopf had a large stained glass window commissioned in his honor which today, is part of the entrance foyer in the Keneseth Israel synagogue in Elkins Park, Pennsylvania. In March 1903, Krauskopf was elected director-general of the Isaac Meyer Wise Memorial Fund, and in July of the same year he became president of the Central Conference of American Rabbis, the main professional organization of reform rabbis.

During World War I Krauskopf continued his patriotic public service, working under Herbert Hoover in the U.S. Food Administration. During this period he spent a good deal of time in Washington. He served on the Liberty Loan Committee for Philadelphia and was worked on issues involving food conservation. This dovetailed with his long relationship to the National Farm School.

== Writings and scholarship ==
Krauskopf was a prolific writer. After his ordination he published 14 major books, hundreds of sermons as pamphlets, numerous journal and newspaper articles, and various other publications.

The Jews and Moors in Spain came from a series of eighteen public lectures Krauskopf gave while he was the Rabbi at Congregation B'Nai Jehudah in Kansas City, Missouri. These lectures were initially published in the Kansas City Journal These lectures were enormously popular among "both Jews and Christians" and thus Krauskopf consented to their publication in book form. Indicative of their popularity, and the political significance of Krauskopf's interfaith activities, the book had letters of endorsement from Thomas T. Crittenden, the former Governor of Missouri and U.S. District Judge Arnold Krekel.

In his book Evolution and Judaism, Krauskopf accepted the idea that science might "overshadow" religion but that the science needs to be well understood and properly connected to religion. Krauskopf accepted the scientific legitimacy of evolution and Darwinian theory. He argued, in a chapter titled "Darwinism", that "Supreme order is the manifestation of supreme intelligence. If I had no other proof for my belief in the existence and sovereignty of an Intelligent Final Cause, I would derive it from my recognition of the fact that supreme order, uninterrupted harmony, eternal and immutable law, control all nature, heaven and earth, all inorganic and organic, in but one way, and in no other." He argues that evolution is simply part of the law of nature and that "this natural law shape matter with design and direct force with a purpose, and design and purpose presuppose intelligence." Krauskopf argued that evolution was the same as "Supreme Governing Power, Supreme Will, Supreme Natural Law" and that "by theologians it is called 'God.'" With "this conception of the nature of God" he argued that "every difference between science and religion disappears" and "with this conception of God, as manifested in nature, I am prepared to accept even Darwinism." Thus, Krauskopf accepted evolution, as set out by Darwin, as consistent with the existence of God, because God provided the "supreme intelligence" to let evolution happen. Under this analysis, there could be no conflict between religion and science, and "Darwinism, though disagreeing with the Biblical account of creation is with religion, not against it." He praised Darwin, declaring that "God has had no better interpreter of the greatness and magnificence of His handiwork." He acknowledged that Darwin "opposed" the "Biblical account" of creation, because modern research proved the Biblical account of creation imperfect," But Krauskopf argued that this science, and Darwinian notions such as natural selection, actually supported the idea of a superior being – God – who set into motion evolution through natural selection. He concluded that "Judaism and ever progressive religion with a conception of God ... can freely and conscientiously accept the theory of organic evolution." Thus, the "sum of Supreme Will, Supreme Power, Supreme Intelligence, evolutionists name The Reign of Natural Law, the theologians call it God." Evolution and Judaism is also interesting because, at the same time as adopting a sceptical approach to traditional readings of the bible, Krauskopf attempted to justify Jewish religious continuity by presenting a Jewish form of panentheism that viewed the universe as an evolving phenomenon and presented a biological argument for the reality of life beyond death.

In Jesus—Man or God? Kraukopf argued Jesus was centrally a Jewish scholar and compares his teachings to those of the Jewish philosopher/ scholar Hillel that the historical persecution of Jews was a result of Christianity rejecting, or forgetting, its Jewish and Old Testament origins and in effect, becoming paganized. As a result of this "the [Christian] church, founded on love and peace and justice, became a church of hatred and inhumanity." He argued that the Protestant Reformation led to "the slow return from the pagan Christ to the Judean Jesus, the gradual stripping away of the many foreign-borrowed accretions under which the Nazarene prophet and patriot had well-night been buried" and thus "after eighteen hundred years of cruel separation, Christian and Jew are drawing closer to each other." He argued that "Unitarian and Reformed Jewish Churches" were "the advance guard of both factions have met." Krauskopf believed that Christianity – and especially the New Testament – had been corrupted by "foreign material and falsified history, of pagan mythology and Persian demonology and Egyptian mysticism." He argued that once modern Christianity purged itself of this invasive material Christianity would move back toward its Jewish roots based on "the Judaism that was taught by a Jewish prophet, and patriot and martyr, the Rabbi of Nazareth."

== Personal life ==
In 1883 Krauskopf married Rose Berkowitz, the sister of his close friend and intellectual collaborator, Henry Berkowitz. In the same ceremony, Henry Berkowitz married Flora Brunn. The ceremony was conducted by Rabbi Isaac Meyer Wise, who had been the mentor to both men at HUC. The Krauskopfs had three children, Harold, Eleanore, and Manfred, before Rose died in 1893. After her death Krauskopf was absorbed in professional duties and activities, including his trip to Russia and founding the National Farm School. However, during this period he managed to court Sybil Feineman, who was the daughter of Krauskopf's former congregants in Kansas City. In fact, Krauskopf had taught her when she took a confirmation class in Benai Jehuda. In 1896 he went back to Kansas City to marry her, in a ceremony at her parents’ house. The Rabbi was 38 at the time and his new wife was 25. They had one child, Madeleine. In 1923 KI made Krauskopf a rabbi for life, with the expectation that he would retire soon. However, shortly after that, on June 12, 1923, Krauskopf died.

Members of his family continued his traditions in many ways. His great nephew was Rabbi Malcolm H. Stern, who became an assistant rabbi at KI, published First American Jewish Families (1960, revised 1991), and was the president of the American Jewish Genealogical Society. Rabbi Krauskopf's son, Manfred, served as the president of the board of trustees of the National Farm School, which his father had founded. The Rabbi's grandson, Joseph L. Krauskopf served on the board of trustees of the Farm School and his great-grandson, Joseph Charles Krauskopf, currently serves on the board of the same institution which has evolved into Delaware Valley University. James Hillman, a psychologist and founder of archetypal psychology, was his grandson.

== Selected publications ==
- ——; Berkowitz, Henry (1884). Bible Ethics : A Manual of Instruction in the History and Principles of Judaism, According to the Hebrew Scriptures. Cincinnati, Ohio.
- The Jews and Moors in Spain. Kansas City: Berkowitz & Co. (reprint available: Kessinger Publishing, LLC (September 10, 2010)). 1886.
- Sunday Discourses (1887–1902)
- Evolution and Judaism. Kansas City, MO: Berkowitz & Co. 1887.
- Service Ritual (1888)
- Service Manual (1892)
- My Visit to Tolstoy: Five Discourses (cir. 1894)
- Gleanings from Our Vineyard (1895)
- The Mourners' Service (1895)
- Sabbath-School Service (1896)
- Society and Its Morals (1900)
- ——; Berkowitz, Henry (1901). A Rabbi's Impressions of the Oberammergau Passion-Play. Edward Stern & Co. (reprint available: 2018 Global Grey)
- The Seven Ages of Man (1902)
- Old Truths in New Books (1902)
- Jesus - Man or God? Five Discourses. Philadelphia, PA: Raynor Publishers. 1915.
