= Mechanicsville, Schuylkill County, Pennsylvania =

Borough in Pennsylvania, US

Mechanicsville, Pennsylvania
- Borough
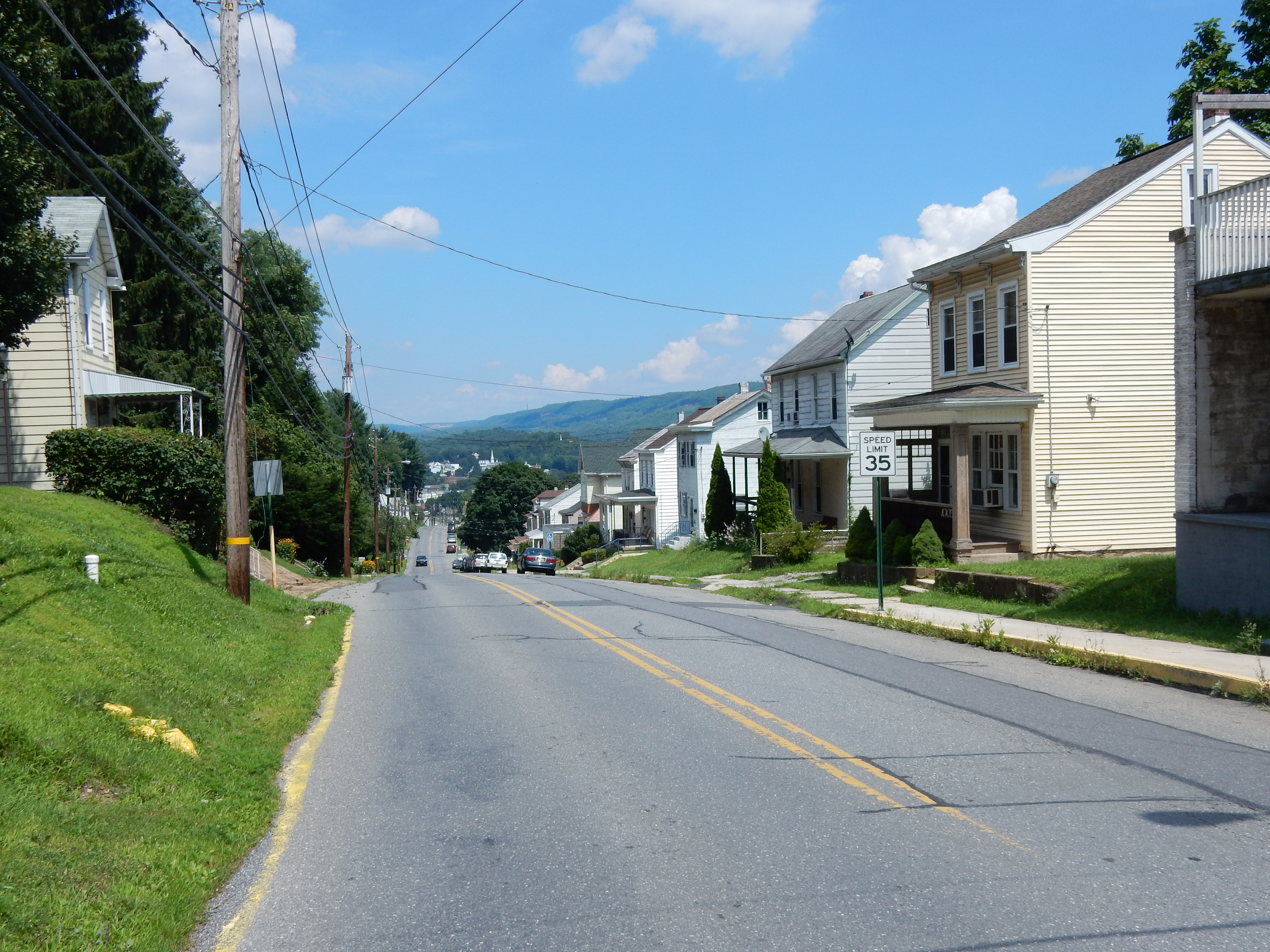
- Pottsville Street in Mechanicsville

- Location of Mechanicsville in Schuylkill County, Pennsylvania.

- Location in Pennsylvania Mechanicsville (the United States)
- Coordinates: 40°41′30″N 76°10′54″W
- Country: United States
- State: Pennsylvania
- County: Schuylkill
- Incorporated: 1914

Government
  - Type: Borough Council

Area
  - Total: 0.32 sq mi (0.84 km^{2})
  - Land: 0.32 sq mi (0.84 km^{2})
  - Water: 0 sq mi (0.00 km^{2})

Population (2020)
  - Total: 461
  - Density: 1,415.1/sq mi (546.38/km^{2})
- Time zone: UTC-5 (Eastern (EST))
  - Summer (DST): UTC-4 (EDT)
- Area code: 570
- FIPS code: 42-48448
- GNIS feature ID: 1215555

Mechanicsville is a borough in Schuylkill County, Pennsylvania, United States. Part of the Pottsville Area School District, it lies between Pottsville and Port Carbon. Pottsville Street is the community's main street.

The population was 463 at the time of the 2020 census.

== Geography ==
Mechanicsville is located at 40°41′30″N 76°10′54″W (40.691596, -76.181576).

According to the United States Census Bureau, the borough has a total area of 0.3 square mile (0.9 km^{2}), all land.

== Demographics ==
Historical population
Census	Pop.	Note	%±
1920	560		—
1930	706		26.1%
1940	748		5.9%
1950	540		−27.8%
1960	588		8.9%
1970	663		12.8%
1980	519		−21.7%
1990	540		4.0%
2000	515		−4.6%
2010	457		−11.3%
2020	463		1.3%
2021 (est.)	464		0.2%

As of the census of 2000, there were 515 people, 209 households and 149 families residing in the borough.

The population density was 1,559.8 inhabitants per square mile (602.2/km^{2}). There were 230 housing units at an average density of 696.6 per square mile (269.0/km^{2}).

The racial makeup of the borough was 98.25% White, 0.19% African American, 0.19% Asian, and 1.36% from two or more races. Hispanic or Latino of any race were 0.78% of the population.

There were 209 households, out of which 28.7% had children under the age of eighteen living with them; 57.4% were married couples living together, 9.1% had a female householder with no husband present, and 28.7% were non-families. 23.9% of all households were made up of individuals, and 13.9% had someone living alone who was sixty-five years of age or older.

The average household size was 2.46 and the average family size was 2.93.

In the borough the population was spread out, with 22.5% under the age of eighteen, 6.0% from eighteen to twenty-four, 25.6% from twenty-five to forty-four, 25.4% from forty-five to sixty-four, and 20.4% who were sixty-five years of age or older. The median age was forty-two years.

For every one hundred females there were 87.3 males. For every one hundred females aged eighteen and over, there were 90.0 males.

The median income for a household in the borough was $34,583, and the median income for a family was $40,556. Males had a median income of $33,750 compared with that of $21,354 for females.

The per capita income for the borough was $16,511.

Roughly 8.0% of families and 12.1% of the population were below the poverty line, including 18.7% of those under age eighteen and 16.7% of those aged sixty-five or over.
