= Peace Islands Institute =

Peace Islands Institute (PII), formerly known as Interfaith Dialog Center (IDC), is a non-profit, tax exempt (501(c) (3)) organization founded by Turkish-Americans of North Jersey in 2003. PII endeavors to promote respect and mutual understanding among all faiths and cultures by organizing educational and cultural activities such as lectures, seminars, conferences, discussion panels, luncheons and trips to Turkey. By this mission PII aims to contribute to improvement of diversity, pluralism and multiculturalism in the society.

PII is a member of the Alliance for Shared Values and both organizations are listed as Gulenist Organizations.

PII started its activities with the leadership of its volunteers by organizing short educational seminars at the conference room of the Rutherford Public Library. PII rented its center at 545 Interstate Place, Carlstadt, New Jersey in the Spring of 2004. PII hired its first full-time staff in the Summer of 2004. Now, PII operates at its office in Newark at 17 Academy Street Suite 701.

PII announced in August 2011 that it had a new name, Peace Islands Institute (PII), and that it would operate not only in New Jersey but also in the East Coast states like New York and Massachusetts.

== Major PII Programs ==
=== Dialog and Unity Dinners ===
They started as a Ramadan Dinner in November 2004. All faiths and cultures, government officials, members of law enforcement, and elected officials come together on this dinner. These dinners gathered many from all walks of life. Mr. Weysan Dun, Special Agent in Charge of FBI Newark, announced his departure from New Jersey at one of PII's dinners on November 18, 2009.

=== PII Awards Ceremony ===
PII Awards started in 2008, publicly recognize the outstanding achievements of those recipients who have distinguished themselves in their profession, community and service to humanity and New Jersey community. The awards are based on a variety of factors, including interfaith/intercultural involvement, community service, education, community educational involvements, professional and community honors, business and professional leadership, and educational honors. Awards ceremony were covered by the media both in 2008 and 2009. Award Ceremonies were on TVs. Ebru TV broadcast the first ceremony in the US and Turkey in their main news program. PII held its 2010 ceremony on June 6, 2010. Honorees included Governor Thomas Kean, Rep. Rush Holt and Ebru TV.

== Aims and Principles ==
Come, come, whoever you are,
Wanderer, idolater, worshiper of fire,
Come even though you have broken your vows a thousand times,
Come, and come yet again.
Ours is not a caravan of despair.
Rumi

Levent Koç, Ph.D. has been serving as PII's director since 2004.

PII has been listed by Harvard University's pluralism project.

== Advisory Board of PII ==
- Ahmet Kurucan, Ph.D.
- Most Rev. Arthur Serratelli, Bishop, RC Diocese of Paterson
- Maxine Clark Beach, Ph.D., Dean of School of Theology and Vice President, Drew University
- Rabbi Jack Bemporad, Director, Center for Interreligious Understanding
- Rev. Donald M. Pitches, Pastor, First Presbyterian Church, Carlstadt
- Rev. Christopher M.F. Brdlik, Rector, Calvary Episcopal Church, Summit
- Mr. Patrick Brannigan, Executive Director, NJ Catholic Conference
- Rev. Robert Morris, Executive Director, Interweave Inc.
- Ms. Maud Dahme, Former President, NJ State Board of Education
- Mr. Alfred Koeppe, President and CEO, Newark Alliance
- Mr. William Jay Roseman, Mayor, Carlstadt
- Kemal C. Ozgur, M.A.
- Mesut Sahin, Ph.D., Apple Educational Services & ACE IT Education
- Mr. John R. Smith, Director - Corporate Responsibility, PSEG
- Ms. Joan Verplanck, President, New Jersey Chamber of Commerce
- Rev. Jacqueline Burgess, Vice President, NJ Council of Churches (representing NJCC)

== See also ==
- KAICIID Dialogue Centre
