= Mike Tobash =

American politician

Member of the Pennsylvania House of Representatives from the 125th district
- In office January 4, 2011 – December 1, 2020
- Preceded by: Tim Seip
- Succeeded by: Joseph Kerwin

Personal details
- Born: July 17, 1964 (age 62) Schuylkill Haven, Pennsylvania, U.S.
- Party: Republican
- Spouse: Amie
- Children: 2
- Education: Elizabethtown College

Michael G. Tobash (born July 17, 1964) is a politician from the U.S. state of Pennsylvania. He is a member of the Republican Party and is a former member of the Pennsylvania House of Representatives for the 125th district. He was elected on November 2, 2010. Tobash announced he would not seek re-election in 2020. Republican Joseph Kerwin of Lykens ran unopposed in the General Election and was elected to fill the vacant seat on November 3, 2020.

Tobash is a graduate of Elizabethtown College.
