= Jonas M. Kilmer House =

Historic house in New York, United States

- U.S. National Register of Historic Places
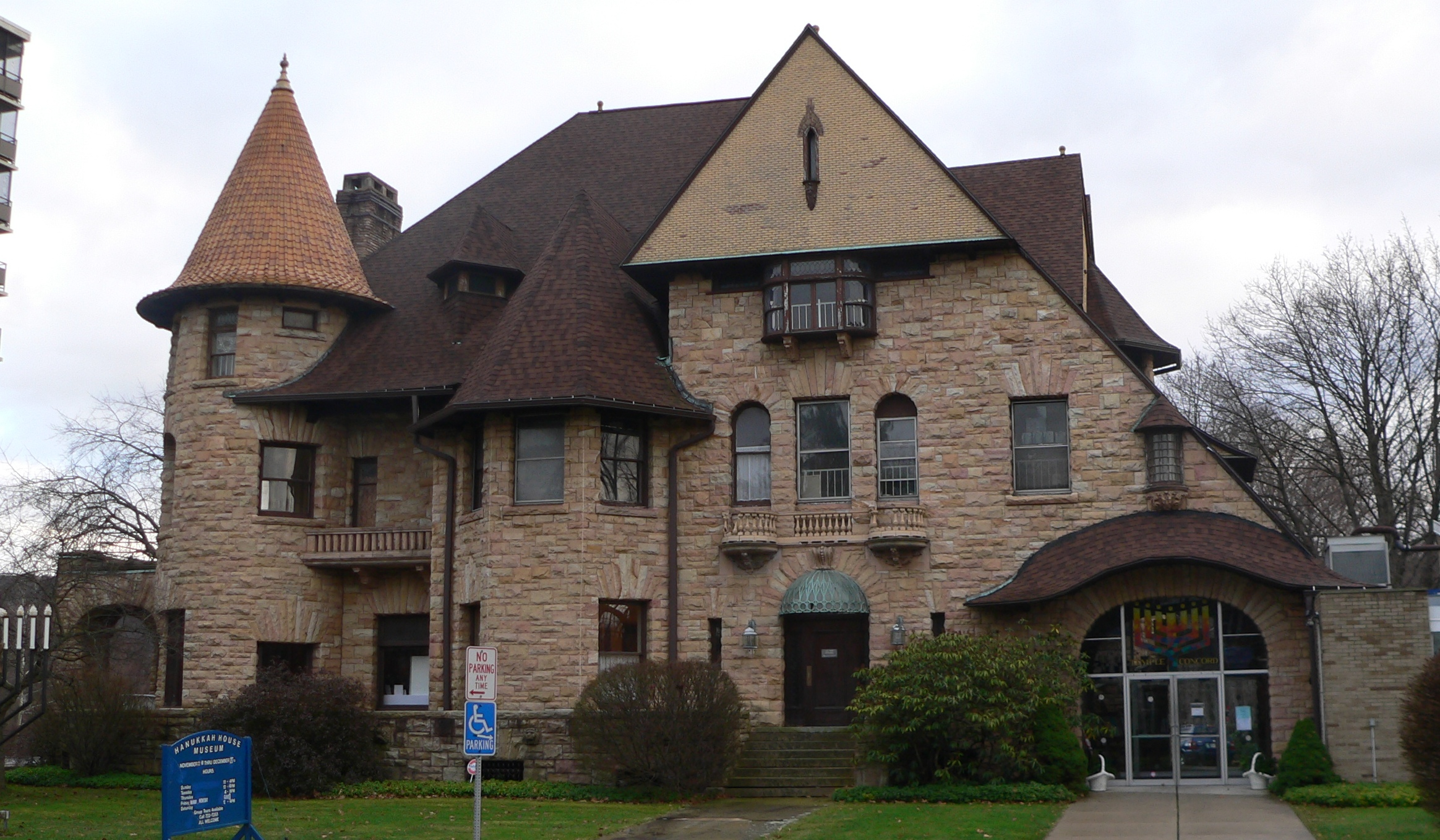
- Kilmer Mansion, seen from across Riverside Drive

- Location within New York Location within the United States
- Interactive map showing the location of Kilmer House
- Location: 9 Riverside Dr., Binghamton, New York
- Coordinates: 42°5′32″N 75°55′19″W
- Area: 2 acres (0.81 ha)
- Built: 1898
- Architect: Vosbury, Charles Edward
- Architectural style: Late 19th And 20th Century Revivals
- NRHP reference No.: 06000885
- Added to NRHP: September 29, 2006

Jonas M. Kilmer House, also known as the Kilmer Mansion, is a historic home located at Binghamton in Broome County, New York. It was constructed in 1898 and is a large 3 1/2-story residence using an eclectic Victorian-era vocabulary. It is primarily constructed of stone and features irregular form and massing. The building is characterized by a variety of different sized gables and turrets, all surmounted by a high hipped roof clad in asbestos shingles. Jonas M. Kilmer (1843–1912) was the father of Willis Sharpe Kilmer (1869–1940).

It was listed on the National Register of Historic Places in 2006.
