= Joseph Kerwin (politician) =

American politician

Member of the Pennsylvania House of Representatives from the 125th district
- Incumbent
- Assumed office January 5, 2021
- Preceded by: Mike Tobash

Personal details
- Born: January 20, 1993 (age 33)
- Party: Republican
- Education: Pennsylvania State University, Penn State Dickinson School of Law, University of Pennsylvania
- Occupation: Attorney, Politician, Soldier

Joseph Kerwin is a Republican member of the Pennsylvania House of Representatives for the 125th legislative district. He was first elected in 2020.

Kerwin currently sits on the Agriculture & Rural Affairs, Game & Fisheries, Gaming Oversight, and Liquor Control committees.
