= Henry W. Sawyer =

American lawyer, civil rights activist and politician

Henry W. Sawyer

Henry Washington Sawyer III (December 23, 1918 – July 31, 1999) was an American lawyer, civil rights activist and politician. Born in Philadelphia, he served in the U.S. Navy in World War II, afterwards returning to the University of Pennsylvania Law School. Sawyer worked as a corporate lawyer but is best known for his advocacy of civil liberties, especially in First Amendment cases. In Abington School District v. Schempp and Lemon v. Kurtzman, he successfully argued cases on behalf of the American Civil Liberties Union before the Supreme Court of the United States that became the basis for all modern Establishment Clause jurisprudence. Sawyer also pursued civil rights causes in Philadelphia and in the South during the civil rights movement of the 1960s. Originally a Republican, he was elected as a Democrat to serve a four-year term on the Philadelphia City Council, where he worked for civil service reform and to increase the amount of public art in the city.

== Early life ==
Sawyer was born in Philadelphia in 1918, the son of Henry Washington Sawyer II and his wife, Helen Curet Sawyer. Although he was a Quaker, Sawyer's family had a tradition of military service dating to the Civil War when his immigrant grandfather, the first Henry Washington Sawyer, served in the 1st New Jersey Volunteer Cavalry. After the war, Sawyer's grandfather became the owner of the Chalfonte Hotel in Cape May, New Jersey. Sawyer's father, Henry Sawyer II, died in the 1918 flu pandemic two months before his son was born, and Sawyer was raised by his mother, a school teacher, in Philadelphia's Germantown neighborhood. He attended high school at Chestnut Hill Academy, graduating in 1936. After graduation, Sawyer enrolled at the University of Pennsylvania (Penn) where he wrote for The Daily Pennsylvanian, joined the Zeta Psi fraternity, and was a member of Phi Beta Kappa.

He graduated in 1940 and started at the Penn law school that same year. At the outbreak of World War II, Sawyer was commissioned in the United States Navy. He served in both the Atlantic and Pacific theaters, but later said that he saw very little combat. Most of his service was aboard the USS Patoka, a fleet oiler. In July 1945, Sawyer was transferred to USS Swan, a minesweeper, on which he served until December of that year. After the war, he returned to law school and graduated in 1948. While in school, he married Grace Scull in 1946. They remained married until her death in 1999 and had three children together: two sons, Jonathan and Henry, and a daughter, Rebecca.

== Legal career ==
After graduation, Sawyer joined the law firm of Drinker Biddle & Reath, where he remained for his entire career. Shortly after joining the firm, he was assigned to work as a temporary assistant district attorney in the O'Malley Case, a prosecution of political corruption in the city (the Philadelphia district attorney's office at that time was mostly staffed by part-time employees drawn from firms as needed). Working under lead prosecutor Laurence Howard Eldredge and alongside assistant prosecutor Lemuel Braddock Schofield, Sawyer assisted in the trial of Chief Magistrate John J. O'Malley for 206 counts of malfeasance in office. O'Malley was found not guilty in two trials in 1948 and 1949. Sawyer was called back into the Navy in 1950 during the Korean War and later as a foreign service officer in Europe. He returned to Philadelphia in 1953.

As a lawyer, Sawyer focused on civil litigation in corporate law, at which he excelled. He also spent much of his time in the field of civil liberties, for which he became more well-known but less well-compensated. In 1951, with Sadie T.M. Alexander and others, he co-founded the Greater Philadelphia Branch of the ACLU. In 1953, he was one of several volunteer (pro bono) defense attorneys in the case of United States v. Kuzma, a prosecution of Communist sympathizers under the Smith Act, which barred anyone from advocating for the overthrow of the American government. The defendants were found guilty, but their convictions were reversed in 1957 after the United States Supreme Court overturned the Smith Act in Yates v. United States.

Sawyer argued again in favor of someone accused of communist sympathies in Deutch v. United States. Sawyer's client, Bernhard Deutch, was a graduate student at the University of Pennsylvania who was subpoenaed by the House Un-American Activities Committee in 1954. Deutch answered most of the committee's questions about his own former membership in the Communist Party as an undergraduate at Cornell University, but declined to answer questions about other members of the party, asserting that his "moral scruples" prevented him from doing so. The House found Deutch in contempt, and the charge was upheld in federal district court. The D.C. Circuit Court of Appeals affirmed the conviction, which Sawyer appealed to the Supreme Court. To his surprise, they took the case and reversed the conviction on the grounds that the government failed to prove "the pertinence of the questions". In an article written after Sawyer's death, Judge Stewart Dalzell credited Sawyer's skillful argument in persuading the Court to overturn the conviction.

=== Abington School District v. Schempp ===
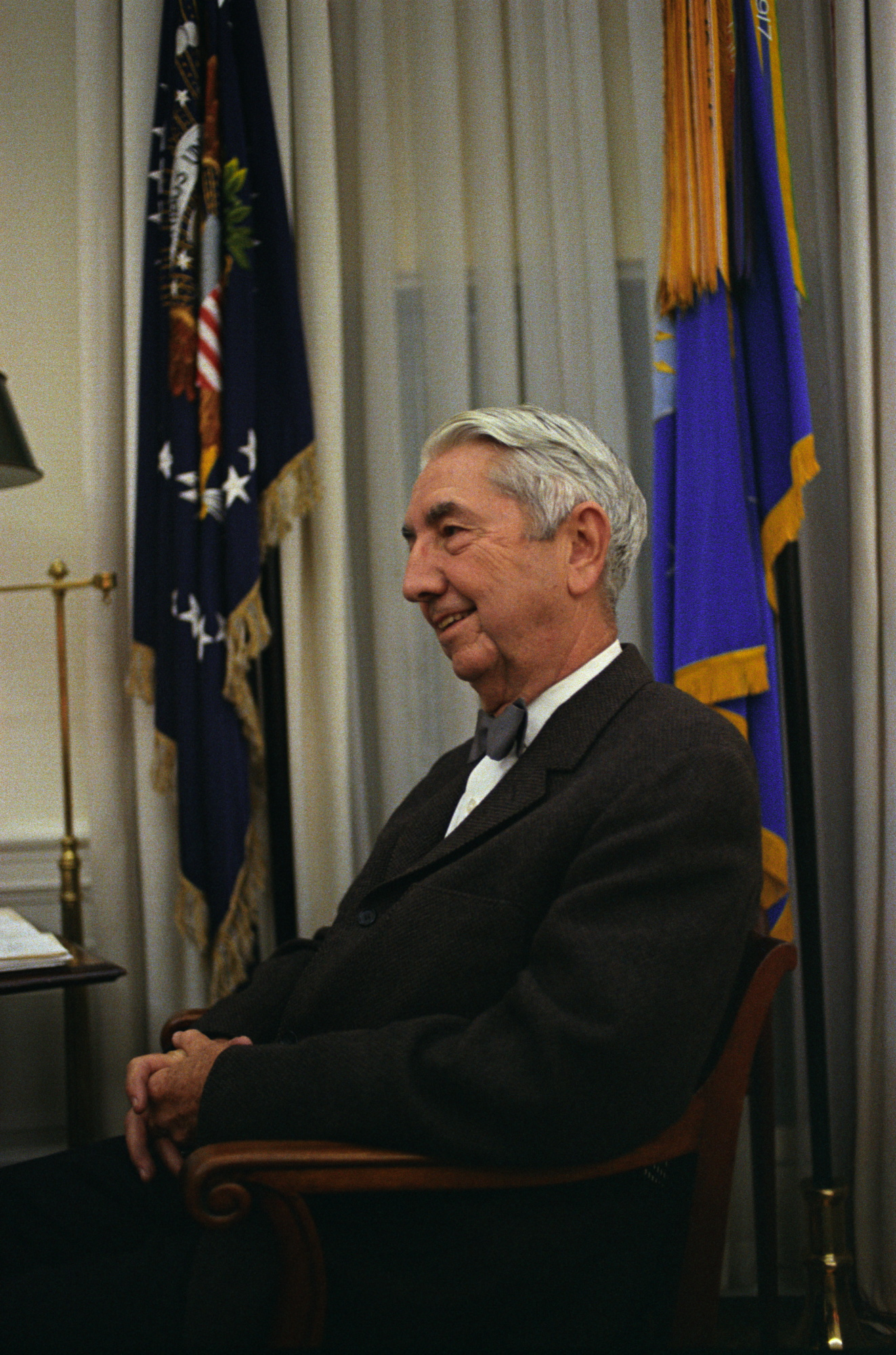
Justice Tom C. Clark wrote the opinion in Abington School District v. Schempp.

In 1957, Pennsylvania law required that public school students read Bible verses to start the day. The Abington School District added another requirement that the students read the Lord's Prayer. Several Unitarians in Abington, a suburb of Philadelphia, objected and held a protest against it. One of them, Ellery Schempp, contacted the American Civil Liberties Union (ACLU) about the issue. The ACLU and Schempp's parents believed the school prayer law violated the First and Fourteenth Amendments to the United States Constitution. The ACLU's lawyers saw Sawyer, then Board chair and later general counsel of the ACLU's Philadelphia affiliate, as the best choice to argue it, given his skill as a litigator and his success in the Deutch case. Sawyer agreed and filed suit in federal district court.

As described by Judge Louis H. Pollak in a 1999 article, Sawyer's "theory of the case was that the prescribed Bible reading, whether or not followed by the Lord's Prayer, constituted both an establishment of religion and an infringement of the free exercise of religion in contravention of the First Amendment as made applicable to the states by the Fourteenth Amendment." The trial began in 1958 before a three-judge panel. The panel agreed in an opinion written by Judge John Biggs Jr. After the trial, the state legislature changed the law to allow students to be excused from the Bible readings if they wished. In further hearings in 1962 the court, again in an opinion by Biggs, held that the law still violated the Constitution by allowing the state "to introduce a religious ceremony into the public schools of the Commonwealth."

The Supreme Court agreed to hear the appeal by the school district, and Sawyer again argued the case. On June 17, 1963, the Court issued an 8–1 opinion upholding the district court ruling and striking down Pennsylvania's school prayer law. In the opinion by Justice Tom C. Clark, the Court enunciated what would become the heart of Establishment Clause jurisprudence: that "to withstand the strictures of the Establishment Clause, there must be a secular legislative purpose and a primary effect that neither advances nor inhibits religion." Pollak credited Sawyer's advocacy at the district court level with helping to win the case: "it is clear that a masterly litigator planted in trial court the seeds of the fruit that was to ripen on appeal."

=== Lemon v. Kurtzman ===
Sawyer further shaped the church-state landscape a few years later in the case of Lemon v. Kurtzman. In 1968, Pennsylvania enacted the Nonpublic Elementary and Secondary Education Act, which allowed the state to reimburse non-public schools for education costs, provided that the costs were not incurred in teaching religion. Although the statute specifically barred state funds from paying for "any subject matter expressing religious teaching, or the morals or forms of worship of any sect", civil rights activist Alton Lemon believed the law still allowed for the state to effectively fund religious schools, a violation of the Establishment Clause. Sawyer took the case and brought suit in district court.

Again arguing before a three-judge panel, Sawyer was initially unsuccessful. Judge Emanuel Mac Troutman, writing for the panel, explained that under the rules set forth in Schempp, the Act had a secular purpose and did not fund religion. Sawyer appealed and the Supreme Court granted certiorari in 1970. In an opinion handed down on June 28, 1971, the Court held for Sawyer's client and struck down the Pennsylvania law. Chief Justice Warren E. Burger, writing for a seven-justice majority, held that "the cumulative impact of the entire relationship arising under the statutes in each State involves excessive entanglement between government and religion."

The test handed down in Lemon remains the core of the process for determining whether a state action violates the Establishment Clause. According to the ruling, a statute does not violate the Establishment Clause so long as it has a secular purpose, its principal effect does not advance or inhibit religion, and it does not foster an excessive government entanglement with religion. After Lemon, Sawyer was regarded as among the premier appellate litigators. Justice William J. Brennan Jr. said to Sawyer in 1988 that "few lawyers have equaled your advocacy."

== Local politics ==
Sawyer and his wife were both Republicans in the 1940s. After witnessing political corruption and voter fraud in their own ward and around the city, they became disillusioned with the party organization in the city and joined the reform effort led by Joseph S. Clark Jr. and Richardson Dilworth. Clark and Dilworth brought together Democrats, independents, and disaffected Republicans like Sawyer in a coalition against the Republican political machine, which they regarded as irredeemably corrupt. In 1949, Sawyer served as a Democratic committeeman and Clark and Dilworth won city offices that year.

While Sawyer was serving overseas, the reform coalition swept the Democrats into power in Philadelphia for the first time in 67 years. When he returned to Philadelphia, Clark asked him to run for an at-large seat on City Council in 1955. By the rules of the limited voting system for the at-large seats, each political party could nominate five candidates and voters could only choose five. The result was that the majority party could take only five of the seven seats, leaving two for the minority party. Sawyer was elected to one such seat and served a single four-year term. In that position, he sponsored legislation to establish the city's One Percent for Fine Arts program, which required one percent of the cost of construction projects in Center City to be spent on public art. He also worked for the creation of a Police Review Board. City Council did not pass that bill, but Mayor James Tate later created the board through an executive order.

Sawyer found himself at odds with the Democratic organization on some occasions, most prominently on amendments to the city charter. In 1956, charter amendments aimed at weakening civil service protections were proposed. Sawyer had campaigned against the idea and refused to go along with it. Even without his support, the amendments found the required two-thirds vote in Council to make it on to the ballot for popular approval. The Pennsylvania Supreme Court struck down some of the amendments, and the rest failed in a referendum that April. Such disagreements led the Democratic City Committee to withhold their endorsement of Sawyer for a second term in 1959, and he retired from elected office to return to his law practice. In 1965, while serving as president of the southeastern Pennsylvania chapter of the Americans for Democratic Action, Sawyer led a group of Democrats who endorsed Republican Arlen Specter for district attorney of Philadelphia.

== Civil rights advocacy ==
Beyond strictly legal and political concerns, Sawyer was also interested in the plight of black Americans, and became involved in the Civil Rights Movement. According to his friend and fellow lawyer, Arlin Adams, Sawyer "was troubled by the treatment of blacks in the South." In 1965, he traveled to Selma, Alabama, to help register black voters there and in Mississippi, and gave legal representation to activists who were charged with breaking local ordinances. Closer to home, he also sued the Philadelphia Police Department and its commissioner, Frank Rizzo, over allegations that black applicants to the police academy were being unfairly rejected. Sawyer represented nine black applicants in a series of cases that spanned nearly a decade, culminating in court-ordered measures to ensure greater racial diversity on the force. In 1972, he again sued Rizzo (who was by then Mayor of Philadelphia) over improper funding of the city workers' pension fund. As Sawyer's son Jonathan recalled in 1999, "a magazine printed Rizzo's top-10 enemies, and my father was on the list. He was very proud that he made it."

== Later life ==
Sawyer served on the boards of many civic organizations, including the World Affairs Council of Philadelphia, the Episcopal Hospital, the Delaware River Port Authority, and the Fairmount Park Art Association. He also had a passion for jazz, hosting a jazz radio show and teaching a course on it at his alma mater, Penn. His wife, Grace, died in May 1999, and Sawyer died on July 31 of that year from lung cancer.

== Sources ==
Books

- Binzen, Peter; Binzen, Jonathan (2014). Richardson Dilworth: Last of the Bare-Knuckled Aristocrats. Philadelphia, Pennsylvania: Camino Books. ISBN 978-1-933822-86-0.
- Fox, Karen (2011). The Chalfonte: The Heroes, Heartaches, Legends, Love Affairs and Unforgettable Characters Behind the Hotel that Became an American Treasure. Cape May, New Jersey: Exit Zero Publishing. ISBN 978-0-9830768-3-4.
- Reichly, James (1959). The Art of Government: Reform and Organization Politics in Philadelphia. A report to the Fund for the Republic. New York, New York: Fund for The Republic. OCLC 994205.
- Solomon, Stephen D. (2007). Ellery's Protest: How One Young Man Defied Tradition and Sparked the Battle over School Prayer. Ann Arbor, Michigan: University of Michigan Press. ISBN 978-0-472-10837-4.

Journals

- Adams, Arlin (November 1999). "In Memoriam: Henry Sawyer: Advocate for the Unpopular". University of Pennsylvania Law Review. 148 (1): 1–5. JSTOR 3312855.
- Coleman, William T. (November 1999). "A Friend's Portrait of Henry W. Sawyer, III". University of Pennsylvania Law Review. 148 (1): 7–14. JSTOR 3312856.
- Dalzell, Stewart (November 1999). "A Voice for Liberty". University of Pennsylvania Law Review. 148 (1): 15–24. JSTOR 3312857.
- Kritzer, Herbert M.; Richards, Mark J. (December 2003). "Jurisprudential Regimes and Supreme Court Decisionmaking: The Lemon Regime and Establishment Clause Cases". Law & Society Review. 37 (4): 827–840. doi:10.1046/j.0023-9216.2003.03704005.x. JSTOR 1555154.
- Pollak, Louis H. (November 1999). "Lawyer Sawyer". University of Pennsylvania Law Review. 148 (1): 25–44. JSTOR 3312858.

Newspapers

- "Colonel Henry W. Sawyer". New York Tribune. October 17, 1893. p. 7 – via Newspapers.com.
- "Died". The Philadelphia Inquirer. October 17, 1918. p. 14 – via Newspapers.com.
- Wister, Jane (December 10, 1946). "Dinner Dance To Honor Grace Scull and Fiance". The Philadelphia Inquirer. p. 20 – via Newspapers.com.
- "O'Malley Acquitted On First Ballot After Only 2 Hours Of Deliberation". The Philadelphia Inquirer. February 3, 1949. pp. 1, 2 – via Newspapers.com.
- Schraga, Saul (February 24, 1956a). "Council Puts Ripper Up In Primary". The Philadelphia Inquirer. pp. 1, 11 – via Newspapers.com.
- Schraga, Saul (April 25, 1956b). "Voters Beat Proposal To Rip Up Charter". The Philadelphia Inquirer. pp. 1, 4 – via Newspapers.com.
- Miller, Joseph H. (February 7, 1959). "Dilworth Likely To Get Green's Backing Again". The Philadelphia Inquirer. p. 7 – via Newspapers.com.
- Goulden, Joseph C. (November 3, 1965). "Specter Wins By 38,000, Hemphill Victor". The Philadelphia Inquirer. pp. 1, 8 – via Newspapers.com.
- Pray, Rusty (August 4, 1999). "Henry W. Sawyer, 80, civil rights crusader". The Philadelphia Inquirer. p. B-4 – via Newspapers.com.

Websites

- "Henry Sawyer Oral History". Walter Massey Phillips Oral Histories. Temple University Special Collections Oral Histories Repository. October 19, 1976. Archived from the original on October 4, 2020.
- "Pennsylvania, Veteran Compensation Application Files, WWII, 1950–1966". Ancestry.com. Pennsylvania Historical and Museum Commission. 2015.
- "Social Security Applications and Claims Index, 1936–2007". Ancestry.com. Social Security Administration. 1999.
- Shuford, Reggie (2019). "A Relatively Brief History of the ACLU of Pennsylvania". ACLU Pennsylvania.
