= Schnader Harrison Segal & Lewis =

Defunct American law firm

Schnader Harrison Segal & Lewis LLP
- Headquarters: Philadelphia, Pennsylvania, U.S.
- No. of offices: 6
- No. of attorneys: Approximately 90
- Major practice areas: General practice; Litigation, Business/Corporate, Tax & Wealth Management
- Key people: Kenneth R. Puhala, Chairman
- Date founded: 1935
- Founder: William A. Schnader
- Company type: Limited Liability Partnership
- Dissolved: 2023
- Website: schnader.com

Schnader Harrison Segal & Lewis LLP was a U.S. law firm based in Philadelphia, Pennsylvania, and founded in Philadelphia in 1935 by former Pennsylvania Attorney General William A. Schnader, Bernard G. Segal, a former Deputy Attorney General serving under Schnader, and Francis A. Lewis. The firm was initially named Schnader & Lewis. Eventually, Segal was added as a name partner. The fourth name partner, Earl G. Harrison, joined the firm in 1948. When the firm announced its closure it had roughly 90 attorneys in six offices nationwide. On August 3, 2023, the firm announced it would dissolve and permanently cease operations.

== History ==
In 1935, after losing his bid for Governor of Pennsylvania, William A. Schnader decided to start his own law firm. He was joined by Bernard G. Segal, who had served as a Deputy Attorney General under Schnader, and Francis A. Lewis, who had been Schnader's campaign treasurer. Earl G. Harrison, the former Dean of the University of Pennsylvania Law School and former Commissioner of the Immigration and Naturalization Service, joined the firm in 1948, becoming the fourth name partner.

The Schnader firm expanded over the years, opening offices in Washington, D.C., Wilmington, Delaware, New York City, Cherry Hill, New Jersey, and Pittsburgh. The firm operated a branch office in Atlanta from 1992-2008 and opened its first West Coast office in San Francisco, in 1999. In 2000, the firm merged with Mesirov Gelman Jaffe Cramer & Jamieson LLP in Philadelphia. In 2013, the firm entered into a non-exclusive association with the Jakarta-based law firm Yang & Co to provide representation to Indonesian companies and individuals requiring legal counsel in the U.S., and to U.S. companies and individuals requiring legal counsel in Indonesia.

At close, Schnader had six offices that served local, national, and international clients ranging from large corporations to start-ups and entrepreneurs to individual clients in more than 40 areas of the law. In addition to the firm’s traditional strengths in complex litigation, commercial transactions, and wealth management, the firm had significant experience and depth in intellectual property, international commerce, labor and employment, financial services, construction law, real estate development, corporate governance, appellate services, technology-based companies, media and communications, government relations and regulatory affairs, energy and environmental issues, nonprofit, education, aviation issues, business reorganization, and securities and shareholder litigation

On August 3, 2023, the firm announced a dissolution of the firm, following a decline in attorney headcount. Schnader had over 300 attorneys in the early 2000s which declined to around 200 following the unwinding of a previous merger. By June 2022 Schnader had 122 attorneys, falling to 90 attorneys when the firm announced its closure.

== Notable lawyers and alumni ==
- Arlin Adams, former judge on the United States Court of Appeals for the Third Circuit (1969 to 1987)
- William H. Brown, III, former Chairman of the U.S. Equal Employment Opportunity Commission
- James J. Eisenhower, 2000 and 2004 Democratic candidate for Attorney General of Pennsylvania
- Ken Gormley, Dean and Professor of Constitutional Law, Duquesne University School of Law, Counsel to the firm
- Philip Hamburger, professor of law at Columbia University Law School
- Earl G. Harrison, Dean of the University of Pennsylvania Law School; Commissioner of the United States Immigration and Naturalization Service, 1942–44
- Timothy K. Lewis, former judge on the United States Court of Appeals for the Third Circuit (1992 to 1999)
- Lewis "Scooter" Libby, former Chief of Staff to Vice President Dick Cheney, practiced with Schnader after graduating from Columbia Law School.
- Neil Thomas Proto, former appellate lawyer, U.S. Department of Justice and General Counsel to President Carter’s Nuclear Safety Oversight Committee, and currently adjunct professor Georgetown University
- Jerome J. Shestack, president of the American Bar Association from 1997 to 1998, and formerly United States Ambassador to the United Nations Human Rights Council from 1979 to 1980.
- Harris Wofford, Democratic U.S. Senator from Pennsylvania from 1991 to 1995 and the fifth president of Bryn Mawr College 1970-1978.
