= O'Malley Case =

The O'Malley Case was the criminal prosecution of the Chief Magistrate of Philadelphia on charges of malfeasance, or serious misconduct in office by a public officer. The trials began in 1948 and continued into early 1949.

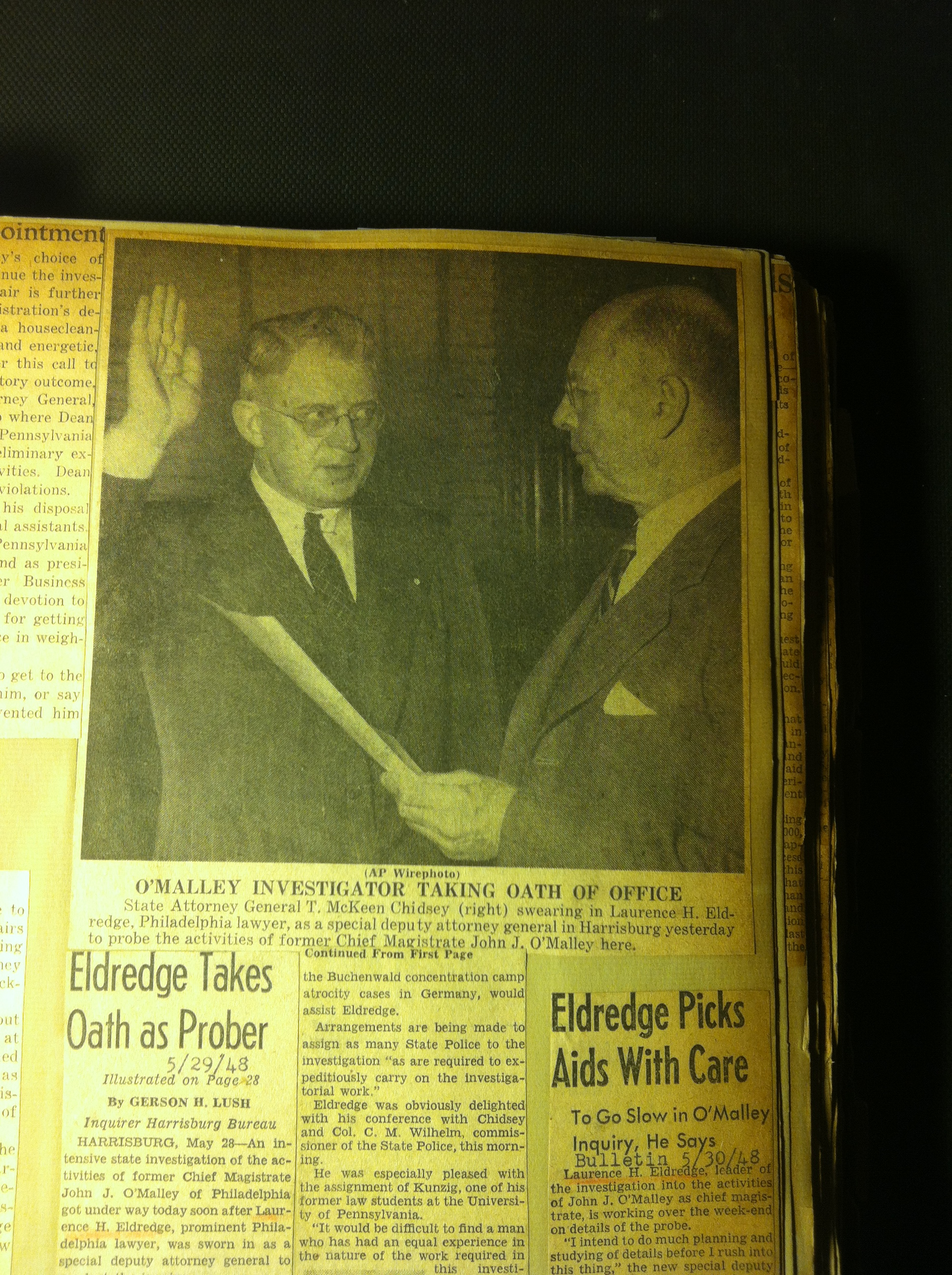
Eldredge sworn in as Special Deputy Attorney General of Pennsylvania

The defendant was John J O'Malley, Chief Magistrate of Philadelphia; the lead prosecutor was Laurence Howard Eldredge; the first assistant prosecutor was Robert Lowe Kunzig; The second assistant prosecutor was Henry W. Sawyer; the defense attorney was Lemuel Braddock Schofield.

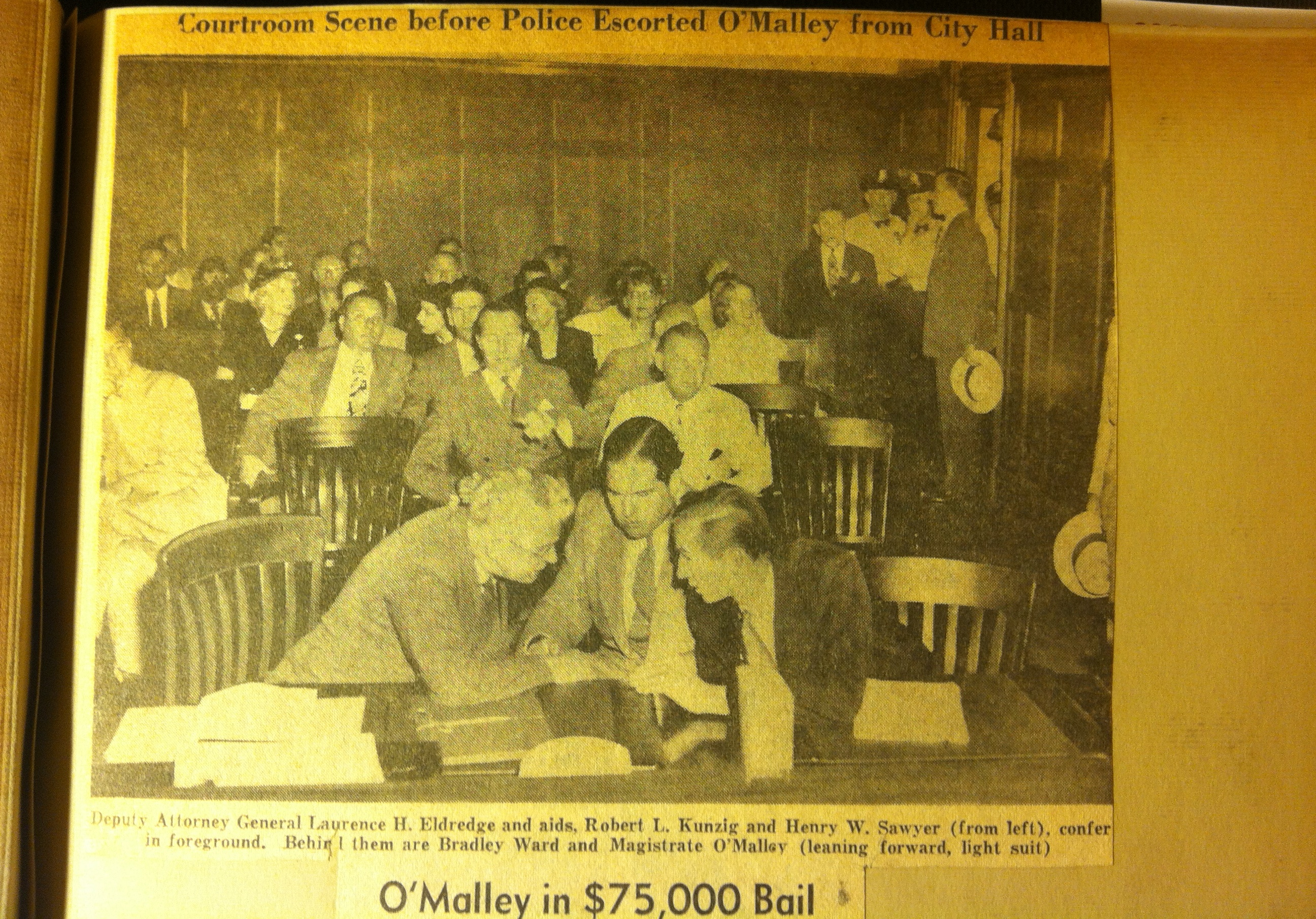
Eldredge, Kunzig, and Sawyer confer in court, O'Malley behind

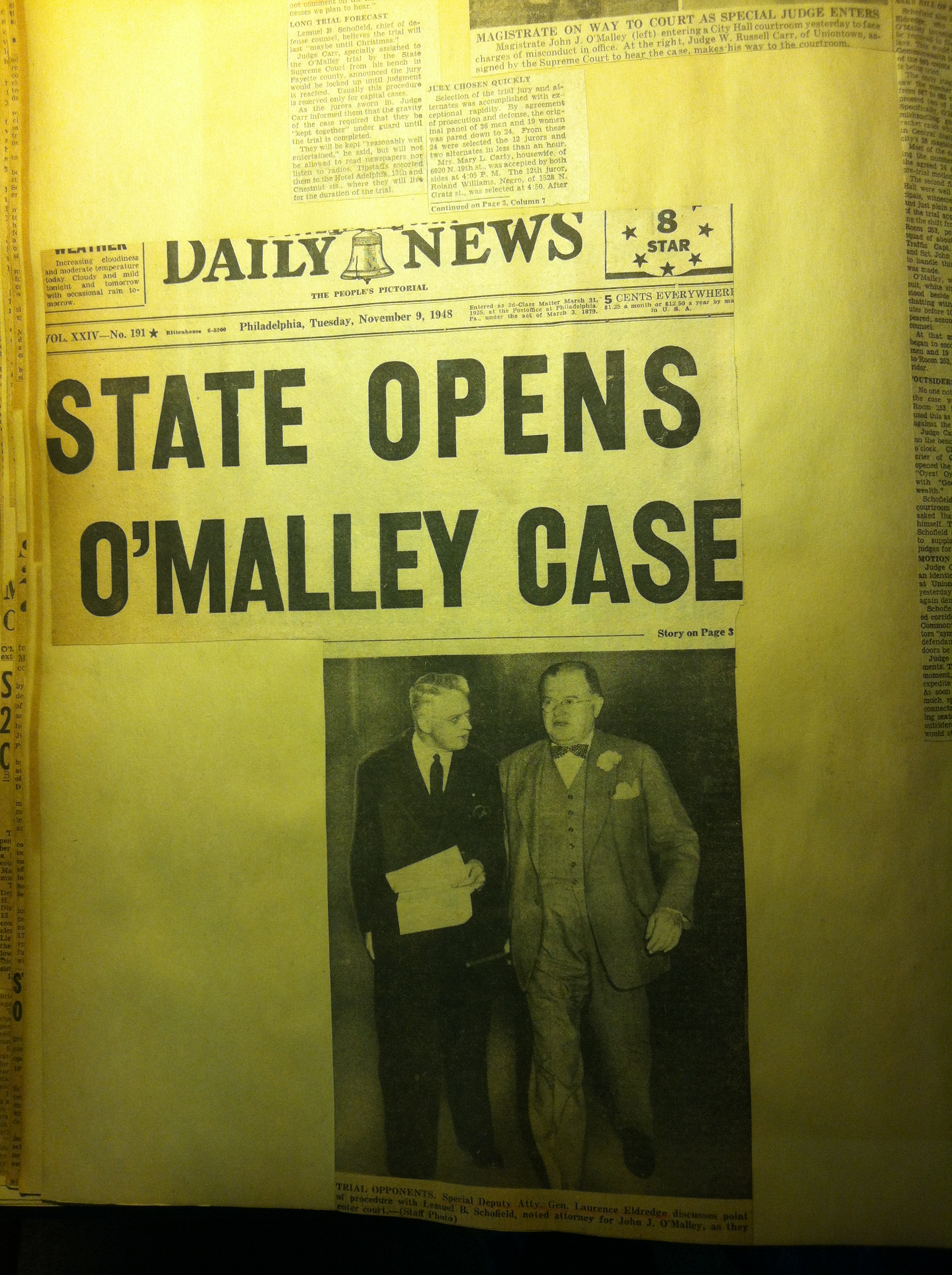
Daily News headline story on the case
