= Edwin R. Keedy =

American legal scholar (1880-1958)

- Born: Edwin Roulette Keedy; January 19, 1880; Boonsboro, Maryland, U.S.
- Died: November 25, 1958 (aged 78)
- Education: Franklin & Marshall College (BA); Harvard University (LLB)
- Employer: University of Pennsylvania Law School
- Title: Dean; Algernon Sidney Biddle Professor of Law
- Predecessor: Herbert Funk Goodrich
- Successor: Earl G. Harrison

Edwin Roulette Keedy (January 19, 1880 – November 25, 1958) was Dean of the University of Pennsylvania Law School from 1941 until 1945, as well as the law school's Algernon Sidney Biddle Professor of Law.

== Biography ==
Keedy was born in Boonsboro, Maryland, to Reuben Miller and Anne Elizabeth (Roulette) Keedy. His early education was in the public schools in Hagerstown, Maryland. He received an A.B. from Franklin & Marshall College in 1899, and an LL.B. from Harvard Law School in 1906.

Keedy then taught at the Indiana University School of Law from 1906 until 1909. He taught at Northwestern University School of Law from 1909 to 1915. He was a colonel during World War I.

Keedy was Dean of the University of Pennsylvania Law School. In 1915, he joined the faculty of the University of Pennsylvania Law School, where he ultimately became the law school's Algernon Sidney Biddle Professor of Law, and he remained there until his retirement in 1945. He served as Dean from 1941 until his retirement.

During World War I, Keedy was a member of the Board of Review of the Judge Advocate General’s Department. During World War II, he was Chairman of the Selective Service Board of Appeals. Noted for his scholarship and writings in the fields of criminal law and criminal procedure, he coauthored the Code of Criminal Procedure for the American Law Institute (1924–29). He was President of both the American Institute of Criminal Law (1924) and the International Law Association (1929).

Keedy died in Philadelphia, at the age of 78.

The Keedy Cup, named after him, is the University of Pennsylvania Law School's internal moot court competition.

Preceded by Herbert Funk Goodrich	Dean of the University of Pennsylvania Law School; 1941–1945	Succeeded by Earl G. Harrison
