= Leonard F. Chapman Jr. =

United States Marine Corps general (1913–2000)

Leonard Chapman
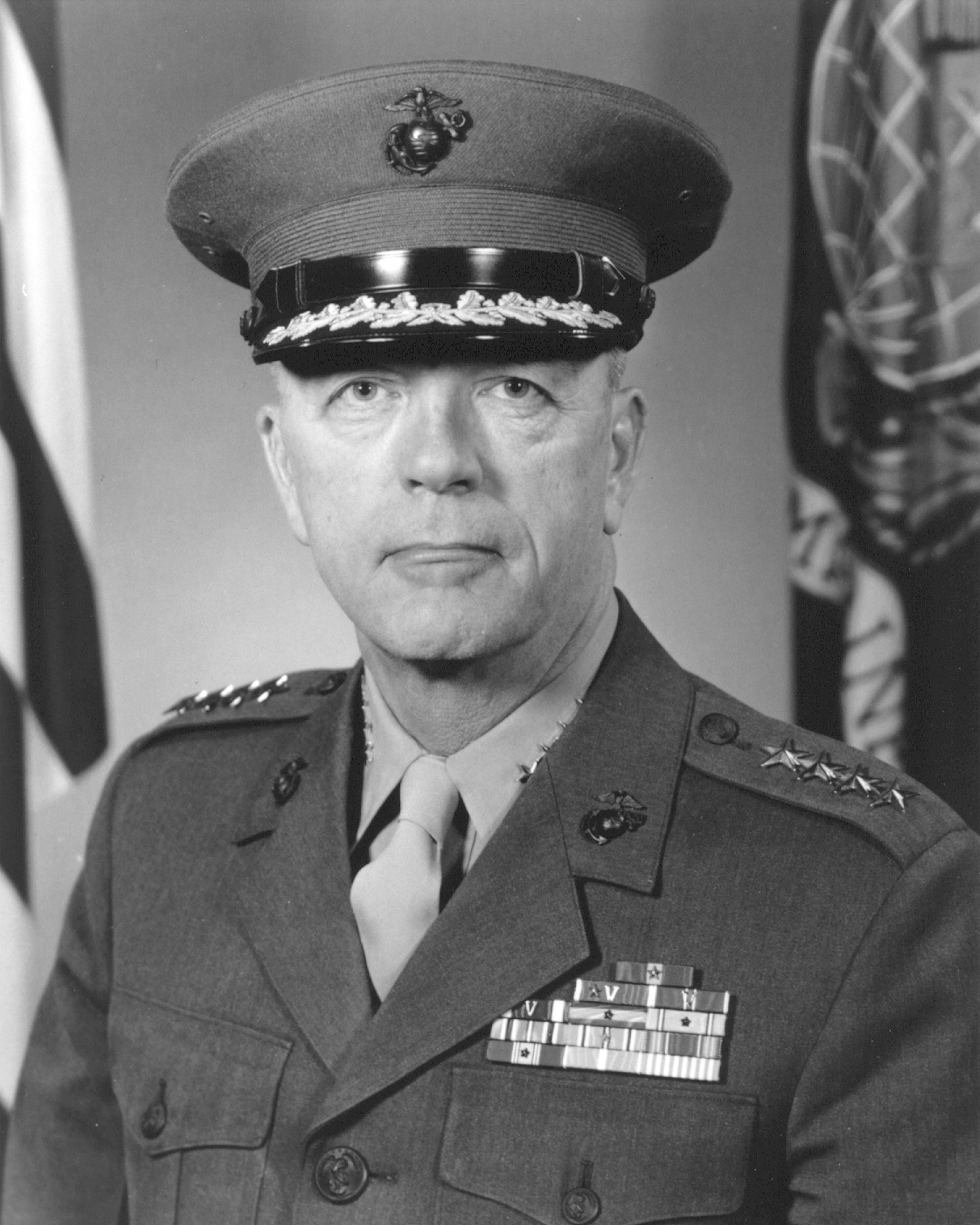

Commissioner of the Immigration and Naturalization Service
- In office November 29, 1973 – May 12, 1977
- President: Richard Nixon; Gerald Ford; Jimmy Carter
- Preceded by: Raymond Farrell
- Succeeded by: Leonel Castillo

Commandant of the Marine Corps
- In office January 1, 1968 – December 31, 1971
- President: Lyndon Johnson; Richard Nixon
- Preceded by: Wallace M. Greene
- Succeeded by: Robert E. Cushman Jr.

Personal details
- Born: Leonard Fielding Chapman Jr. November 3, 1913 Key West, Florida, U.S.
- Died: January 6, 2000 (aged 86) Falls Church, Virginia, U.S.
- Resting place: Arlington National Cemetery
- Education: University of Florida (BA)

Military service
- Branch/service: United States Marine Corps
- Years of service: 1935–1972
- Rank: General
- Unit: Field Artillery Branch
- Commands: Commandant of the Marine Corps; 12th Marine Regiment; 4th Battalion, 11th Marines
- Battles/wars: World War II; Battle of Coral Sea; Battle of Midway; Battle of Peleliu; Battle of Okinawa; Vietnam War
- Awards: Navy Distinguished Service Medal (3); Legion of Merit (2); Bronze Star Medal; Navy Commendation Medal

Leonard Fielding Chapman Jr. (November 3, 1913 – January 6, 2000) was a United States Marine Corps general who served as the 24th Commandant of the Marine Corps from 1968 to 1972. He was a World War II combat veteran, decorated for his actions in the Battle of Peleliu and the Battle of Okinawa. He retired from the Marine Corps after 37 years of service. In retirement, he served as the Commissioner of the Immigration and Naturalization Service.

== Early life ==
Chapman was born in Key West, Florida, on November 3, 1913, and graduated from high school and had a 4.0 GPA in DeLand, Florida. In 1931, he entered the University of Florida, where he became a member of the Naval Reserve Officer Training Corps unit for four years, was initiated into Phi Kappa Tau fraternity, and was tapped into the Florida Blue Key leadership honorary. Upon graduation in June 1935, he was commissioned as a second lieutenant in the United States Marine Corps.

== Military career ==
After completing The Basic School at the Philadelphia Navy Yard, Chapman served with the 1st Battalion, 10th Marines at Quantico, Virginia, from April 1936 until August 1937. In June 1938, after completing Field Artillery School at Fort Sill, Oklahoma, he was assigned to the 10th Marines at Marine Corps Base, San Diego, California. He was promoted to first lieutenant in September 1938.

In June 1940, Chapman departed San Diego for Honolulu. There he completed Gunnery School aboard USS New Orleans before reporting to USS Astoria in July 1940 for a two-year assignment as commanding officer of the Marine detachment. He was promoted to captain in April 1941.

On board Astoria following the outbreak of World War II, Chapman took part in the early Pacific raids culminating in the battles of the Coral Sea and Midway, and earned the Navy Commendation Ribbon with Combat "V". He was promoted to major in May 1942 and returned to the United States in June.

Chapman was assigned to Marine Corps Schools, Quantico, in August 1942 as an instructor in the Artillery Course. He was promoted to lieutenant colonel in May 1943, and that October was named executive officer of the Artillery Section at Marine Corps Schools.

In June 1944, Chapman again departed for combat duty, joining the 1st Marine Division in the Pacific area. He earned the Legion of Merit with Combat "V" for meritorious service as operations officer, 11th Marines, and commanding officer, 4th Battalion, 11th Marines, during combat at Peleliu in September and October 1944; and the Bronze Star Medal with Combat "V" as 4th Battalion commander at Okinawa, April to July 1945.

Following the war, Chapman served as secretary of the general staff, Fleet Marine Force (FMF) Pacific from September 1945 to July 1946. From August 1946 until May 1949, he was stationed at Headquarters Marine Corps (HQMC), Washington, D.C., serving as executive officer, G-3 Section, Division of Plans and Policies. Ordered to Marine Corps Schools, Quantico, Chapman served as coordinator, Reserve Artillery Training Unit; completed the Amphibious Warfare School, Senior Course, in June 1950; and then served as chief of the Supporting Arms Group, Marine Corps Development Center. While at Quantico, he was promoted to colonel in July 1950.

In July 1952, Chapman departed Quantico for Camp Pendleton, California, where he joined the 3rd Marine Division as commanding officer, 12th Marine Regiment. He sailed with the division in August 1953 for Japan, where he continued to command the 12th Marines. In August 1954, he was named commanding officer, Marine Barracks, United States Fleet Activities, Yokosuka, Japan, serving in this capacity until May 1956.

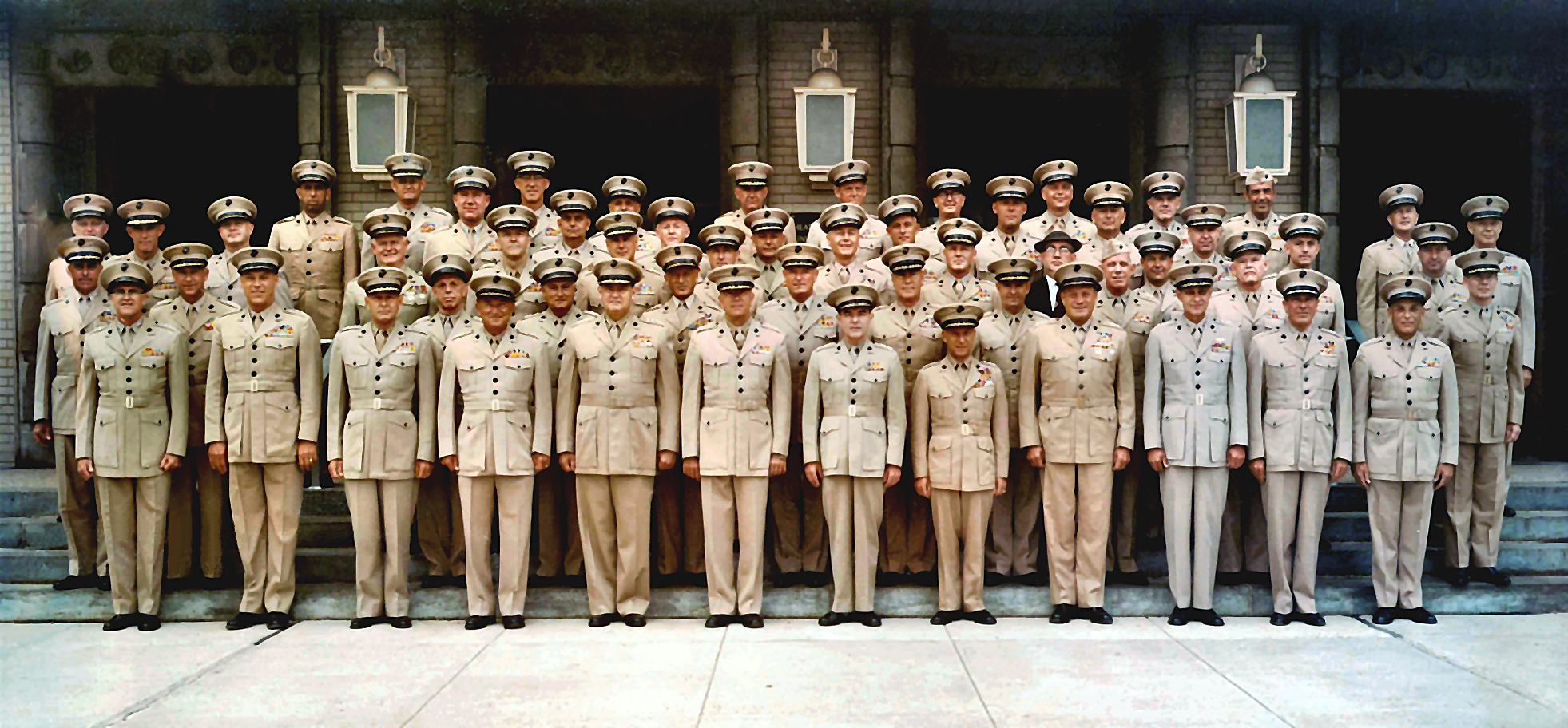
Chapman (6th from left, front row) at the 1967 General Officers Symposium

In July 1956, Chapman assumed duties in Washington, D.C., as commanding officer, Marine Barracks, and director of the Marine Corps Institute. Two years later, he was promoted to brigadier general on July 1, 1958. Following his promotion, Chapman was assigned to Camp Lejeune, North Carolina serving as commanding general, Force Troops, FMF Atlantic, until August 1961. He reported to HQMC in September 1961 for duty as assistant chief of staff, G-4 and was promoted to major general in November 1961. For exceptionally meritorious service in this capacity from September 1961 through December 1963, he was awarded his second Legion of Merit.

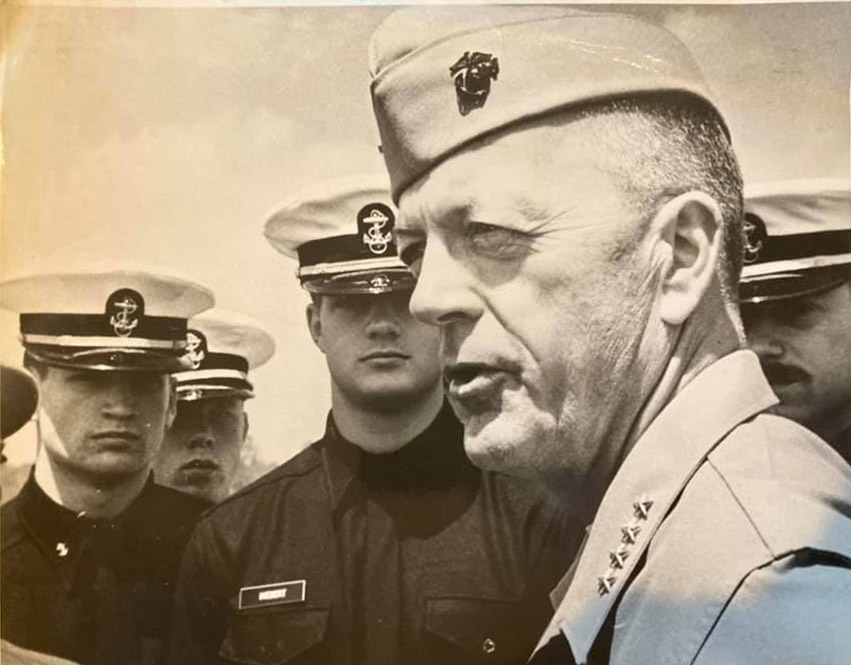
At Camp Lejeune in 1969 with ROTC students.

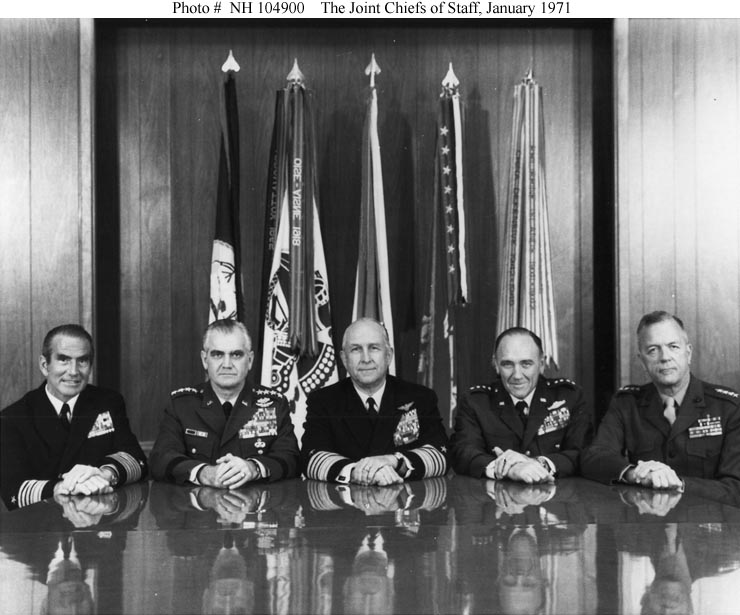
Joint Chiefs of Staff, January 1971; Chapman is on the far right

On January 1, 1964, Chapman was designated as chief of staff, with the rank of lieutenant general. He was awarded the Navy Distinguished Service Medal by the Secretary of the Navy. On July 1, 1967, Chapman became Assistant Commandant of the Marine Corps. While serving as assistant commandant, he was awarded the Armed Forces Management Association Merit Award for 1967. On December 4, 1967, Chapman was nominated by President Lyndon B. Johnson to be the 24th commandant of the Marine Corps and was confirmed by the United States Senate on December 13. On January 1, 1968, he was promoted to general on assuming the office of commandant.

During his first year in office, Chapman traveled widely, covering nearly 100,000 miles while visiting Marines stationed around the world. The heavy commitment to Vietnam took him to that country twice in 1968. In January 1969, President Park Chung Hee of the Republic of Korea presented Chapman with the Order of National Security Merit, First Class. Later that month, Chapman earned a Gold Star in lieu of a second award of the Navy Distinguished Service Medal. As commandant, General Chapman issued orders in 1969, changing some policies within the Corps to bring an end to racial violence while maintaining discipline against persons of any race who failed to live up the standards of the United States Marines, acknowledging discrimination in the past, making concessions to African-American culture, and ordering that "legitimate grievances" of racial discrimination would "receive sympathetic consideration and rapid response."

By the end of his tenure, Chapman witnessed the III Marine Amphibious Force withdrawal from Vietnam and the strength of the Corps drop from a peak of 289,000 to 198,000. Anticipating an austere budget and fewer Marines, he had earlier made his move for a "hard, lean, fully combat-ready Corps," reduced in size, but not in professionalism. Before his retirement, President Richard Nixon presented Chapman a third award of the Navy Distinguished Service Medal, December 10, 1971.

== Immigration and Naturalization Service ==
Chapman retired from the Marine Corps on January 1, 1972, and became Commissioner of the Immigration and Naturalization Service, retiring in 1977.

Canadian journalist Malcolm Gladwell has argued that Chapman's efficient and rigorous enforcement of US borders—ironically stemming from Chapman's idealism and military background—inadvertently created a rise in the population of unauthorized immigrants in the United States. (The Mexican border had been a porous border characterized by circular immigration; stricter enforcement raised the cost of crossing the border and incentivized border crossers to stay longer to justify the cost.)

== Later life and family ==
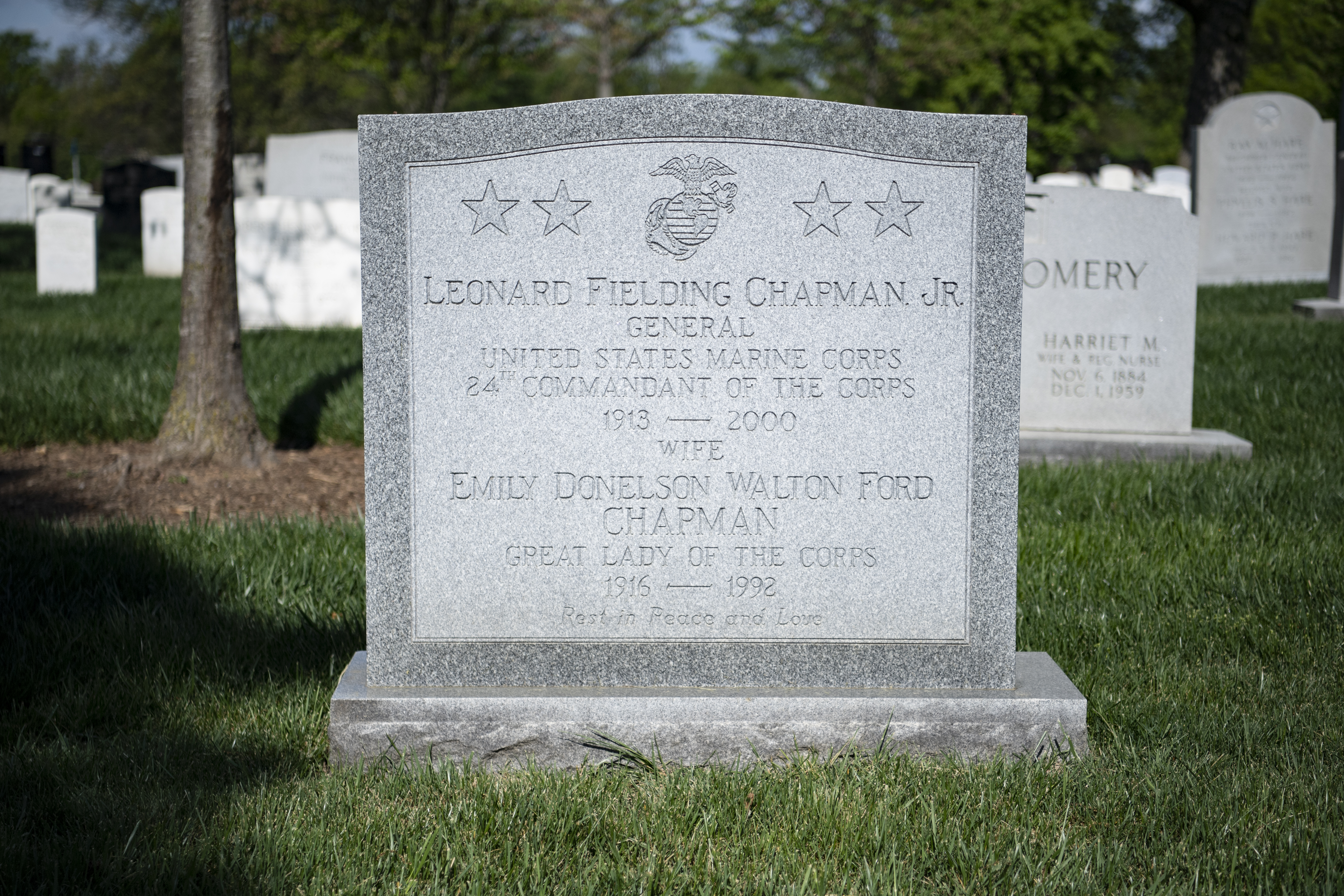
Grave at Arlington National Cemetery

Chapman died on January 6, 2000, at age 86 from complications resulting from cancer. He was buried at Arlington National Cemetery with full military honors on January 14, 2000, at which he was eulogized by former Commandant General Carl Mundy, a friend, fraternity brother, and protégé.

His sons, Leonard F. Chapman III and Walton F. Chapman, were both Marines who served in Vietnam. Chapman was married to Emily Walton Ford Chapman, who died in 1992. His son Leonard died in a scuba diving accident in 1979.

His father, Leonard F. Chapman Sr., was the superintendent (warden) of the Florida State prison at Raiford, Florida from the early 1930s to the mid-1950s, some 25 years. L.F. Chapman Sr. was a nationally noted penologist and authority on prisons.

== Awards and decorations ==
Chapman's awards include:

	Navy Distinguished Service Medal with 2 stars	Legion of Merit with 1 star & valor device	
Bronze Star with valor device	Navy Commendation Medal with valor device	Navy Presidential Unit Citation with 1 star	American Defense Service Medal with 1 star
American Campaign Medal	Asiatic-Pacific Campaign Medal with 5 stars	World War II Victory Medal	National Defense Service Medal with 1 star
Korean Service Medal	Korean Order of National Security Merit, Tong-il Medal	National Order of Vietnam, Officer grade	United Nations Korea Medal

== See also ==
- List of United States Marine Corps four-star generals

Military offices
Preceded by Wallace M. Greene	Commandant of the Marine Corps; 1968–1971	Succeeded by Robert E. Cushman Jr.
Political offices
Preceded by Raymond Farrell	Commissioner of the Immigration and Naturalization Service; 1973–1977	Succeeded by Leonel Castillo
