= Alan C. Nelson =

Alan Nelson
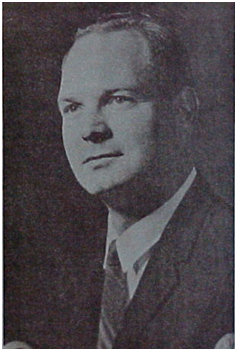

Commissioner of the Immigration and Naturalization Service
- In office February 22, 1982 – June 16, 1989
- President: Ronald Reagan; George H. W. Bush
- Preceded by: Leonel Castillo
- Succeeded by: Gene McNary

Director of the California Department of Rehabilitation
- In office 1972–1975
- Governor: Ronald Reagan
- Preceded by: Robert Howard
- Succeeded by: Ed Roberts

Personal details
- Born: Leonel Jabier Castillo; 1933 Oakland, California, U.S.
- Died: October 18, 1997 (aged 63) Sacramento, California, U.S.
- Party: Republican
- Education: University of California, Berkeley (BA, LLB)

Alan C. Nelson (1933-1997) was a Commissioner of the Immigration and Naturalization Services (INS) (February 22, 1982, to June 16, 1989) under the administration of then United States President Ronald Reagan, and co-author of the original proposal behind California Proposition 187 (passed November 1994).

== Early life and education ==
Nelson was born in Oakland, California. Nelson obtained an undergraduate degree in business administration from the University of California, Berkeley, where he was a member of Tau Kappa Epsilon fraternity, and graduated from the University of California, Berkeley Law School in 1958.

== Career ==
=== Before September 1981: California government and private sector law ===
Before September 1981, Nelson had worked in both the California state government and the private sector.

- 1958–1964: Attorney at the law firm of Rogers, Clark & Jordan
- 1964–1969: Deputy District Attorney for Alameda County, California. His co-workers here included Edwin Meese, who would later become a counselor to President Ronald Reagan
- 1969–1972: Assistant director of the California Department of Human Resources
- 1972–1975: Director of the California Department of Rehabilitation (section)
- 1976–1981: Lawyer with the Pacific Telephone and Telegraph Company

Nelson's years in the California state government were under the governorship of Ronald Reagan, who would later nominate Nelson for the position of INS Commissioner. Nelson played an important part in Reagan's welfare reform efforts. He also served as Chairman of the California Governor's Committee for Employment of the Handicapped. He received numerous awards from various public and private organizations for his role in working with the handicapped in California.

=== September 1981 to February 1982: Transition from Deputy Commissioner to Commissioner of the INS ===
On September 23, 1981, Nelson assumed the position of Deputy Commissioner of the Immigration and Naturalization Services (INS), to which he was appointed by then United States Attorney General William French Smith. At the time, INS had not had an appointed Commissioner since Leonel Castillo's resignation in September 1979, and it had been run under Acting Commissioner David W. Crosland and later Doris Meissner.

Reagan's first nominee for INS Commissioner had been Norman Braman, but Braman withdrew his nomination on November 12, 1981, citing his desire to spend more time on his automobile business in Florida. On November 17, 1981, Reagan announced the nomination of Nelson for the position of INS Commissioner. The plan was for Meissner, who was Acting Commissioner at the time, to change to the role of Deputy Commissioner once Nelson was appointed. Reagan's choice of Nelson was welcomed by Michael G. Harpold, head of the National Immigration and Naturalization Service Council, the union representing INS workers. Harpold noted that the nominee's close relationship with the White House (and specifically with Edwin Meese) would elevate the status of INS as an organization.

Nelson's appointment as INS Commissioner was confirmed by unanimous consent of the United States Senate on February 8, 1982, and he assumed the office on February 22, 1982. Meissner moved to the role of Executive Associate Commissioner.

=== February 1982 to June 1989: Work as INS Commissioner ===
Nelson 's tenure at the INS was marked by significant changes to the organization. In 1983, the INS under Nelson began working with the United States Catholic Conference on amnesty, with the Catholic Conference seeking to play the role of guiding aliens in applying for amnesty and representing them as de facto lawyers.

The amnesty program was finally passed as part of the Immigration Reform and Control Act of 1986, that additionally imposed employer sanctions and enhanced border security. The INS under Nelson implemented these provisions. As part of this, Nelson opened more than 100 new field offices to process amnesty requests, beefed up the United States Border Patrol, and began work on the Systematic Alien Verification for Entitlements (SAVE) program intended to help government agencies deny benefits to aliens who were not eligible for them. Nelson also announced in October 1987, and subsequently implemented, the INS' "Family Fairness" executive action.

Under Nelson's leadership, the agency grew by $650 million to more than $1 billion and the staff swelled by 6,000 to a total of about 17,500.

In 1989, the United States Department of Justice, under United States Attorney General Dick Thornburgh (who had taken office in 1988 under President Reagan and continued in office under George H. W. Bush), conducted an audit of the INS. Aides to Thornburgh told The New York Times in March 1989 that Thornburgh was eager to replace Nelson and bring the INS more firmly under his own control. The audit revealed a range of alleged problems around agency mismanagement, including 23,000 citizenship certificates lost by the regional agency in Miami (officials claimed all but 5% of the lost certificates were found), $1500 spent on an oil portrait of Nelson, and unclear accounting, management, and administrative practices. The audit also noted a growing backlog in cases awaiting decisions.

Nelson was fired from his post, with his last day as INS Commissioner on June 16, 1989. Deputy INS Commissioner James L. Buck was named acting head of the service, and Gene McNary was rumored to be the next nominee for the role. Nelson continued on at the INS in a Consultant role for a few more months, to help with a successful transition to his successor. McNary assumed the office of INS Commissioner on October 26, 1989.

== Political activism ==
After finishing his work at the INS, Nelson resumed private law practice in California. Amidst growing concern in California about illegal immigration from Asia and Latin America, he worked with Harold W. Ezell to come up with a proposal to bar illegal immigrants from receiving an array of public benefits, from education to health care. This proposal went on the California ballot as California Proposition 187 in November 1994, and passed comfortably. However, some of the provisions were challenged and got tied up in the courts later.

In 1995, Nelson leveraged his knowledge in immigration law and experience at the INS to work with Julie Pearl, an immigration attorney in the Bay Area, to co-found Pearl Law Group (now Pearl Immigration) and focus on global immigration, I-9 compliance, and mobility management for companies. In the following years, Nelson contributed to help develop the framework to ImmigrationTracker, an immigration management software for use by law firms and enterprise organizations in the United States.

== Death ==
Nelson died on January 29, 1997, in Sacramento, California. At the time of his death, Nelson had been married to JoAnn Wallen Nelson for 37 years. The couple had three daughters, Kristy Nelson Leffers, Kathy Turner and Karin Nelson, and one granddaughter.

Political offices
Preceded by Leonel Castillo	Commissioner of the Immigration and Naturalization Service; 1982–1989	Succeeded by Gene McNary
