= Leonel Castillo =

Lone Castillo
- Castillo in 1970

Commissioner of the Immigration and Naturalization Service
- In office May 13, 1977 – October 1, 1979
- President: Jimmy Carter
- Preceded by: Leonard Chapman
- Succeeded by: Alan C. Nelson

Personal details
- Born: Leonel Jabier Castillo; June 9, 1939 Victoria, Texas, U.S.
- Died: November 4, 2013 (aged 74) Houston, Texas, U.S.
- Party: Democratic
- Education: St. Mary’s University, Texas (BA); University of Pittsburgh (MA)

Leonel Jabier Castillo (June 9, 1939 – November 4, 2013), nickname “Lone”, was born in Victoria, Texas. In 1941, his family moved to Galveston, Texas.

He was one of the first Mexican Americans to graduate from high school in 1957 and graduated with a bachelor's degree in English from St. Mary’s University in 1961. Castillo, wanting to travel the world, headed to New York City where he had no luck. After being informed that he had been accepted into the Peace Corps, he was sent to the Philippines. Once he had a wife and child it didn't stop him from continuing his education. Instead, he went on to complete his master's degree in community organization. After completing his master's degree, Castillo and his family moved to Houston. Within the first week in Houston, Castillo was very involved with the community and in political groups. He was the first Hispanic Houston City Comptroller in 1972 to be elected by the city.

== History ==
His parents moved to Galveston in 1941 because it was very hard for them to find jobs in Victoria, due to the depression. Galveston was beginning to grow because of the war. For Castillo’s family that meant it was easy to find a job in the shipyard, where his father worked hard for 30 years. His father was a labor organizer, labor leader, and president of the Docking Gang. The Docking Gang was a group made up of poorly educated Mexicans. His father argued for their benefits such as fighting for bathrooms. Castillo had 3 siblings, Seferino, Anita, and Mary. With his father being involved in a union, all four siblings grew up in a home with different political views and became activists and organizers.

Castillo was a very quiet kid growing up, but it didn't stop him from becoming the head leader of many political groups. He grew up working in the docks with his father and friends, who looked after him from the time he was a very small kid with big glasses. Since Castillo was the one with a good education, he also helped his father keep the books for the union. It was rare for Mexican Americans to graduate from high school, but Castillo was one of the first. He graduated from Curwin High School in 1957. After graduating, he went on to St. Mary’s University in San Antonio where he completed his Bachelor’s in English. At St. Mary’s he stayed very busy and was involved in many organizations. Castillo was in the student government group where he later became president. He also was the leader of the Young Democrats and leader of Young Students for Civil Liberties (YDCL). A couple of his professors at St. Mary’s are the ones who triggered his interest in politics. Dr. Billy Crane was his government professor, along with Brother Luis Schuster, S.M., who encouraged Castillo as an English honors student.

Shortly after graduating from St. Mary’s in 1961 with a bachelor's degree in English, Castillo packed up the little belongings he had and hitchhiked to New York. There, Castillo had a couple of small jobs and later came in contact with his mother back in Galveston. His mother had news that he had been accepted to the Peace Corps, which he had forgotten he had even applied for. So he gathered his things and took a bus to Pennsylvania, where he attended the Peace Corps training. After training, he was sent to the Philippines from 1961 to 1965. In the Philippines, he taught English and Arithmetic. Later he became a Volunteer Leader and had over 55 volunteers in the city he was in charge of. Castillo was very comfortable in the Philippines. He met his wife Evelyn there and they had a daughter named Avalyn.

In 1965, Castillo was accepted to the University of Pittsburgh Graduate School of Public Health. While in Pittsburgh, Castillo and his wife had their second child, a boy named Efrem. Castillo was involved with a group called the United Negro Protest Committee (UNPC) where he learned about demonstrations, marches and pickets. When Castillo was done with school in Pittsburgh, he had a master's degree in Community Organization, and decided to move back to Texas where he lived in Houston to learn more about his own culture.

Within a week from moving to Houston, Castillo was already involved in the community and in political groups. A political group that he was quickly involved in was a group named PASO, Political Association of Spanish Speaking Organization. Castillo was the executive secretary for the PASO organization. PASO was the best organized political group for the little amount of money that they had. The PASO organization later died after coalition. Castillo had a couple of small jobs, working in a welfare office and later at the Ripley House, where he stayed involved with working for the communities. He left the Ripley House to work with the Bishop and at the same time attend law school at the University of Houston. The first day that classes started for law school, a boycott had begun. The 1969 school boycott where a group of Mexican Americans formed a loose confederation called the Mexican-American Education Council (MAEC). Castillo became the chairman and spokesperson of the MAEC organization and also had the media’s attention in 1970. With this great advantage Castillo became interested in becoming the City Controller. He kept the idea of running for City Controller a secret until it was close to Election Day. However, this secret did not mean he did not campaign. Signs began to go up all over Houston "Castillo for City Controller" over a year before the election. People would see the signs but there was no Castillo taking credit for them this created a "buzz" of who was responsible for these poster, who was the Castillo behind them but the voter connected the name "Castillo" with the office. Since Castillo had already made a good impression on the voters it made it easy for him to get this position even when his competitor was in office for 21 years. Castillo won the runoff election in December 1971. On April 7, 1977, President Jimmy Carter nominated Leonel Castillo as Commissioner of Immigration for the United States Citizenship and Immigration Services, making him the first Hispanic to hold that role and the first Hispanic appointed to President Carter's administration. Castillo, 37 years old, accepted office on April 27, 1977.

In 1979, he resigned from the immigration services and went back to Houston to run against mayor, Jim McConn, finishing third out of nine candidates. Castillo attempted to run unsuccessfully for several city offices in the 1980s.

== Footnotes ==
unbelt: A History of Mexican-Americans in Houston.

- Fraser, Jayme. "Leonel Castillo, Activist, Former City Controller, Dies." Houston Chronicle N.p., 4 Nov. 2013. Web. 25 Apr. 2014.
- Castillo, Leonel (1996). "Oral History Interview with Leonel Castillo, 1996." Interview by Jos A. Gutirrez, PH.D. The University of Texas at Arlington Center for Mexican American Studies. N.p., 28 June 1996. Web. 21 Apr. 2014.
- Castillo, Leonel (1975). "Leonel Castillo." Interview by Louis Marchifava. Houston Area Digital Archives. Houston Library, 7 March. 1975. Web. 21 Apr. 2014.
- USCIS History. U.S Citizen and Immigration Services. Commissioner of Immigration and Naturalization Service Leonel J. Castillo. N.p., 17 Sept. 2013. Web. 25 Apr. 2014.

Political offices
| Preceded by Leonard Chapman | Commissioner of the Immigration and Naturalization Service; 1977–1979 | Succeeded by Alan C. Nelson |
