= California Department of Rehabilitation =

Vocational rehabilitation agency in California

California Department of Rehabilitation (DOR)
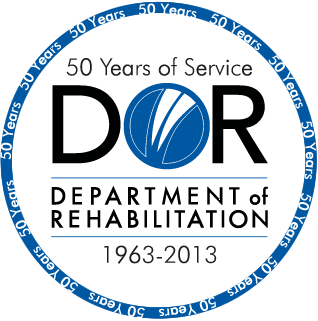

Agency overview
- Formed: October 1, 1963
- Jurisdiction: California
- Headquarters: Sacramento, California
- Employees: 1,884
- Annual budget: $421.3 million FY2012/13
- Agency executive: Kim Rutledge, Director from 2025
- Parent agency: California Health and Human Services Agency
- Website: dor.ca.gov

The California Department of Rehabilitation (DOR) is a California state department which administers vocational rehabilitation services. It provides vocational rehabilitation services and advocacy from over 100 locations throughout California seeking employment, independence, and equality for individuals with disabilities. The DOR was established on October 1, 1963.

== Overview ==
The DOR assists eligible Californians with significant disabilities to obtain and retain employment and maximize their ability to live independently in their communities.

The annual budget for the 2012/2013 Fiscal Year is $418.6 million. There are 1,823 authorized staff positions statewide, and approximately 145,000 consumers receiving services annually. The Rehabilitation Services Administration, a division of the U.S. Department of Education’s Office of Special Education and Rehabilitative Services, provides grant funds and oversight to DOR for rehabilitative services and independent living.

== History ==
A 1964 educational film on vocational rehabilitation and Orientation and Mobility for a newly blind man, made with assistance from the California Department of Rehabilitation.

Historically, the California government developed various agencies and services to aid and rehabilitate people with physical, mental, visual, and hearing disabilities. The federal Rehabilitation Act established the Bureau of Vocational Rehabilitation within the Department of Education in California as early as 1921. The Department of Education administered the Division of Special Schools and Services. Established in 1946, the Division included such services as the California School for the Blind, Training Centers for the Adult Blind, Bureau of Vocational Rehabilitation, and Schools for the Cerebral-Palsied Children. The Department of Social Welfare, established in 1942, administered the Bureau of Aid to the Needy Blind. Legislation enacted in 1963 consolidated the relevant services of these agencies into one Department of Rehabilitation.

In 1961, Governor Edmund G. “Pat” Brown, Sr. established the Health and Welfare Agency as part of his plan for the reorganization of state government. Designed to reduce government costs and improve efficiency, Governor Brown's reorganization plan created eight super agencies within the executive branch of California government (Chapter 2038, Statutes of 1961). As originally organized, the Health and Welfare Agency consisted of the departments of Social Welfare, Mental Hygiene, and Public Health.

In 1963, the Edmund G. Brown administration added the Department of Rehabilitation to the departmental divisions of the Health and Welfare Agency (Chapter 1747, Statutes of 1963).

== List of directors ==
In the past 50 years the DOR has had 9 Directors.

=== Warren Thompson (1963-1966) ===
- Initiated the publication of the Rehabilitation Review to report DOR activities.
- Department qualified for additional federal funds.
- Engaged with other state departments that served individuals with disabilities.

=== Robert E. Howard (1967-1972) ===
- Initiated a program to enable more people with significant disabilities to be hired in Social Security Administration offices throughout the State.
- Reorganized the Department to serve all disability groups—which resulted in three administrative divisions and corresponding deputy directors.

=== Alan C. Nelson (1972-1975) ===
- Established a new Mobility Barriers Section.
- Instituted a new hiring program for people with severe disabilities at the University of California, Berkeley.
- Developed the first Operational Plan for the Department.
- Appointed Dr. Carolyn Vash as Chief Deputy Director. Dr. Vash was the first person with a severe disability and the first female to hold a top-level position in the Department.

=== Edward V. Roberts (1975-1982) ===
- Served as a disability rights advocate from Berkeley.
- Established an Office of Consumer Affairs.
- Published the first handbook about consumers’ rights.
- Involved the Department to assist in resolving conflict over the regulations for Section 504 of the federal Rehabilitation Act of 1973.
- Developed independent living centers through the Department of Rehabilitation, which led to the addition of a new section to the Rehabilitation Act of 1973.

=== Dr. P. Cecie Fontanoza (1983-1990) ===
- Broadened the Department's services to include: Supported Employment, Workability, the Transition Partnership Project, the Mental Health Initiative, the Hi-Tech Resource Center, and the Cooperative Transportation Grant Program.
- Instituted several award programs including: Annual Department Awards, Building a Better Future Awards, and the Governor's Hall of Fame.
- Developed annual conferences: Beyond Disability and Supported Employment.

=== Bill Tainter (1991-1993) ===
- Increased representation of people with disabilities in top-level management positions in the Department.
- Governor Wilson oversaw the Department's role as lead in the Americans with Disabilities Act (ADA) implementation and established the ADA Unit in the Department.

=== Brenda Premo (1994-1998) ===
- Launched the California Assistive Technology System (CATS) initiative to provide people with disabilities information on assistive technologies and related services.
- Advanced the development of informed choice for consumers in vocational rehabilitation.
- Established the State Independent Living Council as a free standing State agency.
- Modernized the Orientation Center for the Blind.

=== Catherine T. Campisi, Ph.D. (1999-2006) ===
- Established the Workforce Development Section to work with the employer community.
- Vocational Rehabilitation (VR) consumers wages increased by 14 percent from 1999-2003.
- Served as chairperson of the California Workforce Investment Board Universal Access Workgroup to build capacity for accessibility of One-Stop Career Centers.
- First Chairperson of the Governor's ADA Interagency Task Force.

=== Anthony “Tony” P. Sauer (2007-2014) ===
- As part of the American Recovery and Reinvestment Act of 2009, DOR received and expended $61.8 million in federal stimulus funds to make infrastructure and programmatic improvements. This included $56.5 million for vocational rehabilitation, $1.6 million for independent living, and $3.7 million for blind programs.
- On January 1, 2012, the Governor's Committee on Employment of People with Disabilities transferred from the Employment Development Department to the Department of Rehabilitation. The name changed to the California Committee on Employment of People with Disabilities..
- In January 2013, DOR began statewide implementation of the new Vocational Rehabilitation Service Delivery Team Model. The new model signaled a shift to a more consumer-centric, team approach to service delivery.

| No. | Portrait | Name | Took office | Left office | Governor Appointed by | Governor Reappointed by |
|---|---|---|---|---|---|---|
| 1 | | Warren Thompson | 1963 | 1966 | Edmund G Brown | |
| 2 | | Robert E Howard | 1967 | 1972 | Ronald Reagan | |
| 3 | | Alan C. Nelson | 1972 | 1975 | Ronald Reagan | |
| 4 | | Edward V Roberts | 1975 | 1982 | Edmund G Brown Jr | |
| 5 | | Dr. P. Cecie Fontanoza | 1983 | 1990 | George Deukmejian | |
| 6 | | Bill Tainter | 1991 | 1993 | Pete Wilson | |
| 7 | | Brenda Premo | 1994 | 1998 | Pete Wilson | |
| 8 | | Cathrine T Campisi PH.D. | 1999 | 2006 | Pete Wilson | |
| 9 | | Anthony "Tony" P Sauer | 2007 | 2014 | Arnold Schwarzenegger | Edmund G Brown Jr |

== Programs ==
The major divisions of the Department of Rehabilitation are the Office of the Director, Administrative Services Division, Specialized Services Division, which includes the Business Enterprises Program, Blind and Visually Impaired and Deaf and Hard of Hearing, and Vocational Rehabilitation Policy and Resources Division, Vocational Rehabilitation Employment Division, and the Community Access Division.

=== Vocational rehabilitation program ===
The Department administers the largest VR program in the country. Employment services are provided annually to approximately 115,000 individuals with significant physical and mental disabilities to assist them prepare for and obtain competitive employment in integrated work settings. Approximately 1,300 vocational rehabilitation staff in over 85 offices throughout California provide direct services to individuals requiring multiple services over an extended period of time. The purpose of the program is to assist individuals with disabilities in preparing for entering into, and retaining competitive employment in integrated work settings. The department provides services such as consumer assessment, counseling and guidance, purchase of individualized rehabilitation services and job placement. The program provides services to individuals with a full range of physical and mental disabilities, pursuant to federal law.

Individualized vocational rehabilitation is the major service provided by the Vocational Rehabilitation Employment Division (VRED), the largest organizational unit in the department, and the Specialized Services Blind & Visually Impaired and Deaf & Hard of Hearing Division (SSD). The Department delivers its principal service, vocational rehabilitation, through qualified rehabilitation professionals located in statewide district and branch offices. A vocational rehabilitation team works with job seekers to provide services and resources necessary to prepare for, find, and retain employment. DOR vocational rehabilitation services may include career assessment and counseling, job search and interview skills, education and training, and assistive technology.
