= Vocational rehabilitation =

Occupation rehabilitation processes

Rehabilitation
- Specialty: Vocational

A 1964 educational film on vocational rehabilitation and Orientation and Mobility for a newly blind man, made with assistance from the California Department of Rehabilitation

Vocational rehabilitation, often abbreviated as VR or voc rehab, is a process which enables persons with functional, psychological, developmental, cognitive, and emotional disabilities, impairments or health disabilities to overcome barriers to accessing, maintaining, or returning to employment or other useful occupations.

Whilst, traditionally, the focus of vocational rehabilitation was job retention, an increased focus on an all-encompassing approach has become popular in contemporary approaches. Approaches differ between countries, however, due to the differing amounts of financial and political support vocational rehabilitation receives. Occupational therapists are the core profession involved, and services offered commonly include financial, psychological, and social support.

== Summary ==
Vocational rehabilitation varies greatly between countries. However, it generally focuses on improvements to the socialisation, healthcare and physical and mental wellbeing of the person receiving the services. People eligible for vocational rehabilitation generally include those with long-term sicknesses, mental health disorders, common health problems and severe medical conditions. Services offered to those who are eligible commonly include financial support, psychological support and social support.

Commonly, healthcare programs rely on their successes to gain support. However, vocational rehabilitation is unique as it is largely reliant on employer compliance and willingness to involve themselves in the process. Subsequently, it is often marketed in a way that focuses more on the business gains of the program.

There is a large amount of research dedicated to the development and improvement of vocational rehabilitation. Contemporary focus on vocational rehabilitation arose from an increased focus on social security systems on a governmental level. It is believed to be beneficial for people to return to work and to experience full integration into society, which is typically assisted by vocational rehabilitation. Moreover, rehabilitation programs encourage fewer people to rely on governmental financial support by facilitating greater movement into jobs for people with disabilities who, typically, are excluded from the workforce.

There is a large cultural influence on approaches to disability and subsequently, disability services. Developed countries such as the US, UK and Australia have had systems in place for rehabilitation services for many years. Developing countries, however, have historically been more focused on combatting diseases and thus, have had less resources to dedicate to the development of rehabilitation programs. There is large amounts of stigma surrounding disability in developing countries. As a result, there is a lack of vocational rehabilitation programs in these countries which in turn has consequences on the economic and social development within them. The World Health Organisation, however, have implemented programs within developing countries in order to better establish their rehabilitation plans for people with disabilities.

Whilst it is a popularly used form of intervention throughout many countries, vocational rehabilitation is often criticised for being inefficient and unsuccessful. Furthermore, some critics claim that there is not enough emphasis placed on women with disabilities in need of vocational rehabilitation services.

== Professionals involved ==
Occupational therapists are the core profession in vocational rehab. The role of occupational therapists in the workplace is to facilitate individuals' ability to return to work. Occupational therapists assist their clients in reaching their maximum level of function with the aim of meeting the physical and emotional demands of their job. Occupational therapists are also qualified to make recommendations to employers on how to adapt job demands to meet the functional status of an employee in order to prevent further injury and enable productivity during occupational rehabilitation. Individual functional capacity evaluations are used to screen for person-environment fit. Industrial occupational therapists use a collaborative approach involving the workers and employers to encourage a supportive work environment that empowers the worker to reach productivity and other work related goals. Occupational therapy interventions in vocational rehabilitation include developing assertiveness; communication and interpersonal skills; controlling anger; and stress management, adapting environment, identification and use of compensatory strategies to enable functions within the job.

Other involved professionals may be occupational psychologists, physiotherapists, kinesiologists, occupational physiologists, and occupational physicians.

== By location ==
=== Vocational rehabilitation in the United States ===
==== History ====
The Vocational Rehabilitation Program was created in 1920. This program was created under the supervision of the Rehabilitation Services Administration (RSA) which was formed by the US government to facilitate a variety of programs for vocational rehabilitation.

The President's Committee on Employment of the Handicapped was formed in 1945, which later became the President's Committee on Employment of People with Disabilities and today is known as the Office of Disability Employment Policy.

By the end of the 20th century, a number of services were created to facilitate support for vocational rehabilitation. In the 1980s, jobs specifically for people with disabilities were created and the idea of ‘equal access’ became more widespread. The ‘Americans with Disabilities Act’ was implemented in 1990 and afforded people with disabilities the same set of rights that had historically been granted to women and marginalised groups.

==== Current ====
Currently, a variety of federal services exist to facilitate vocational rehabilitation in the United States. The Department of Disability Services has a dedicated sect to vocational rehabilitation services where applicants are provided with a counsellor to develop an Individual Plan for Employment. The Office of Disability Employment Policy further facilitates employment opportunities for people with disabilities.

The Social Security Administration pays benefits to people with disabilities whilst the Rehabilitation Services Administration (RSA) administers grants to those eligible, although state vocational rehabilitation agencies are able to obtain funding from the Social Security Administration in certain cases (such as via the Ticket to Work program). Eligibility is determined, firstly, by whether an individual's disability is preventative of employment. Furthermore, the individual needs to benefit from vocational rehabilitation services and further be able to succeed in employment goals. Sometimes, for clients where job retention is not a feasible outcome, vocational rehabilitation services are more geared towards proliferating vocational skills.

Some programs offer clients education services in conjunction with their rehabilitation, which has been shown to improve their occupational outcomes. Other programs facilitate jobs in mental health services for people with mental health histories as they often prove to be of great use in such job fields. Overall, however, a strong link between successful recovery and maintaining employment has been made.

The US Department of Veterans Affairs offers vocational rehabilitation programs specifically for veterans whose disabilities are related to their years in active service. Such programs include employment assistance, business assistance and job retention. All veterans are provided with a Vocational Rehabilitation Counsellor to create a rehabilitation program. These counsellors tend to dictate the success of individual rehabilitation programs, particularly through the relationship developed between the veteran and the counsellor.

==== Criticisms ====
Of people who suffered traumatic brain injury and used vocational rehabilitation services in the state of Missouri, only 17% were successful in their employment at the time of their case closure. Furthermore, 20.5% of people with disabilities enter the United States labour force and on average they are paid about 37% less. Vocational rehabilitation further tends to cater to advantaged communities, with people from disadvantaged backgrounds less likely to reach out for vocational rehabilitation services and are furthermore, less likely to be found to be eligible.

==== State agencies ====
There are different agencies in the US that run VR programs, including the following:

VR state agency or division	Headquarters of agency or division	Notes
Alabama Department of Rehabilitation Services (DRS)	602 S. Lawrence Street, Montgomery	Toll free number restricted to Alabama residents only
Alaska Department of Labor and Workforce Development, Division of Vocational Rehabilitation (DVR)	550 W. 7th Ave., Suite 1930, Anchorage	Address is for DOLWD main office in Anchorage.
Arizona Department of Economic Security, Rehabilitation Services Administration (RSA)	1789 W Jefferson Street, Phoenix	
Arkansas Department of Career Education, Rehabilitation Services Division (RSD)	525 W Capitol Ave, Little Rock	
Arkansas Department of Human Services, Division of Services for the Blind (DSB)	700 Main Street, Little Rock	
California Department of Rehabilitation (DOR)	721 Capitol Mall Dr, Suite 110, Sacramento	
Colorado Division of Vocational Rehabilitation	707 17th Street, Suite 2700, Denver	
Connecticut Aging and Disability Services	55 Farmington Avenue 12th floor, Hartford	Offers vocational rehabilitation and services for the blind
Georgia Vocational Rehabilitation Agency	200 Piedmont Ave. SE West Tower - Suite 1410, Atlanta	
Kansas Department for Children and Families, Rehabilitation Services	555 S. Kansas Avenue, Topeka	
New York State Education Department, Adult Career and Continuing Education Services - Vocational Rehabilitation (ACCES-VR)	89 Washington Avenue, Albany	
Missouri Department of Elementary and Secondary Education, Vocational Rehabilitation	3024 Dupont Circle, Jefferson City	
Opportunities for Ohioans with Disabilities	150 E Campus View Blvd, Suite 300, Columbus	
Oregon Department of Human Services, Vocational Rehabilitation	500 Summer St NE, E87, Salem	
South Carolina Vocational Rehabilitation Department	1410 Boston Ave #2138	West Columbia, SC 29170

=== Vocational rehabilitation in the United Kingdom ===
==== History ====
Vocational rehabilitation has been in practice in the UK since the early 1900s. However, initially it was simply seen as a measure taken after the individual had received the necessary medical treatment. In 1946, the ‘Egham Industrial Rehabilitation Centre in Surry’ became open for public use, following the Second World War. In 1951, the National Health Service (NHS) had primary control over rehabilitation services, offering a variety of programs. However, in the 1980s, the recession in the UK saw a decline in focus on vocational rehabilitation. The NHS shut down many of their rehabilitation service centres which consequently led the Department of Employment to take over responsibility for rehabilitation services.

From 2000 to 2002 the Vocational Rehabilitation Association led a government funded research project into vocational rehabilitation and how to better improve it in the UK. By 2003 nearly 2.7 million people in the UK were receiving government disability benefits which the government could not sustain. Such large numbers indicated the lack of vocational rehabilitation services throughout the UK. As a result, ‘Jobcentre’ was created to facilitate work services for disability, overseen by the Department for Work & Pensions.

==== Current ====
Currently, a variety of services are in place to facilitate vocational rehabilitation. In 2005, the Department of Health released “The National Service Framework for Long-term Conditions”. The report was a part of a government plan to improve support for those with long-term health conditions and worked closely with improvements to the NHS, who are in part responsible for assisting those in need of vocational rehabilitation.

The British Society of Rehabilitation Medicine represents medical professionals involved in vocational rehabilitation services, who are an important part of the rehabilitation process. However, it is widely understood that the responsibility for the success of vocational rehabilitation services is largely with the employer. This includes creating healthy workplace environments, providing mentors, creating stable work hours and providing a large variety of workplace necessities. As a result, the Vocational Rehabilitation Association supports businesses who facilitate vocational rehabilitation for their employees. In 2016, the NHS released “Commissioning Guidance for Rehabilitation” which served as an official document for rehabilitation providers. It outlined clear guidelines on expectations and policies in regard to administering rehabilitation services, including vocational rehabilitation.

JobCentre Plus provides people in vocational rehabilitation programs with a variety of services to support their rehabilitation process. Firstly, they provide Disability Employment Advisors which supervise the process of somebody returning to and staying in the workplace. They also provide the Alternative and Augmentative Communication scheme to facilitate those with limited communication skills in the workplace, and the Access to Work Scheme which provides employers of people with disabilities with suitable resources.

==== Criticisms ====
Only 14% of brain injury patients in the UK successfully remain at full-time work 30 months after their injury, even after the use of vocational rehabilitation services. Whilst a large amount of money is put into such services, the average payback period for people who successfully maintain employment is as long as 20 months.

=== Vocational rehabilitation in Australia ===
==== History ====
The ‘Disability Services Act’ in 1986 created standards for Australians with disabilities and was later amended, in 1993, to include financial support. In 2014, it became the ‘Disability Inclusion Act’ which officially recognised the human rights of people with disabilities. In 2007, the ‘Disability Services (Rehabilitation Services) Guidelines’ was developed to create outlines on how to provide rehabilitation services in Australia. In 2017, it was amended and included further guidelines on the facilitation of rehabilitation processes. In 1990 the Australian government created the ‘Disability Reform Package’ which improved financial support for disability related issues.

Vocational rehabilitation is also made available to veterans in Australia, with the ‘Veterans’ Vocational Rehabilitation Scheme’ being created under the ‘Veterans’ Entitlement Act 1986’ which focused on stable employment and further, employment retention for veterans. The importance of recognising not only physical but mental disabilities of veterans, however, is a recent revelation that has led to an increased focused in programs to support such disabilities.

==== Current ====
From 2006, the Australian government introduced a policy where people who were capable of seeking and maintaining employment had an obligation to do so. In return countless services and financial support options are made available to facilitate the return to work.

To be eligible for vocational rehabilitation services an individual must have some form of a disability that is preventative of employment retention. Some people may be eligible for counselling services, as well as guidance and rehabilitation services. Financial and housing services and assistants in the workplace are further available to those who qualify for such level of rehabilitation. The differing levels of support offered are determined through a Job Capacity Assessment in which an individual's needs are assessed and then appropriately met.

Typically, vocational rehabilitation services are offered through independent organisations associated with workplaces, or individual workplaces themselves with occupational therapists, psychologists, physiotherapists and exercise physiologists often utilised in the process.

The National Disability Insurance Scheme was introduced in 2013 as a means of providing better financial support for people with disability. It was an important factor in better improving job security for people with disability by providing them with increased social and economic freedom.

The ‘Employer Incentive Scheme’ (Australian Government, 2016) provides financial support to employers who actively participate in vocational rehabilitation; however, such support is only available if employers comply with ‘Disability Services (Rehabilitation Services) Guidelines’.

==== Criticisms ====
In Australia, there has been limited research dedicated to vocational rehabilitation, with most of the research coming from the United States. Furthermore, providers of vocational rehabilitation in Australia are not required to obtain any form of certifications. Resultantly, the teaching of vocational rehabilitation at universities needs to be improved in order to improve the state of vocational rehabilitation in Australia.

== By disability or condition ==
=== For common mental disorders ===
Many workers have an increased risk of developing common mental disorders (CMDs) in the workplace due to job stressors such as job insecurity, bullying or psychological harassment, low social support at work, employee perceptions of fairness in the workplace, and an imbalance between job demands and rewards. These CMDs may include anxiety disorders, alcohol dependence, addiction-related disorders, suicidal ideation, and depression

A symptom of CMDs is having disorganized and deteriorated habits. Therefore, during work rehabilitation, occupational therapists and/or other rehabilitation professionals often use a graded environment, intentionally eliminating barriers to increase individuals' performance and self-esteem. An integrative approach, based on the three key disciplines of medicine, public health, and psychology, is being utilized by occupational therapists to reduce job stressors and improve the psychological well-being of employees with CMDs. The purpose of an integrative approach is to prevent further harm to the employee and to learn how to manage the illness through health promotion, occupational psychology, positive psychology management, psychiatry, and occupational medicine.

Cognitive work hardening programs administered by occupational therapists using the Canadian Model of Client-Centered Enablement (CMCE) improve return to work outcomes of employees who have depression. Cognitive work hardening incorporates meaningful occupations or work tasks that are graded to fit individual needs within an environment that is supportive in order to improve self-worth. Cognitive work hardening programs are individualized to promote interpersonal communication and coping skills within a real-life work setting.

The "stimulating healthy participation and relapse prevention" (SHARP) approach is used for individuals with CMDs who experience many sick absences from work. This approach encompasses five steps: listing positive and negative situations encountered in the workplace, finding solutions to negative situations or problems, supporting need for solutions, planning how to implement solutions, and evaluating of implementation.

== See also ==
- European Platform for Rehabilitation
- Psychiatric rehabilitation
- Rehabilitation counseling
- Vocational education
- Vocational Rehabilitation and Employment (Disabled Persons) Convention, 1983
