= Earl G. Harrison =

American lawyer (1899–1955)

Earl Harrison

Commissioner of the Immigration and Naturalization Service
- In office July 20, 1942 – July 20, 1944
- President: Franklin Roosevelt
- Preceded by: Lemuel Schofield
- Succeeded by: Ugo Carusi

Personal details
- Born: Earl Grant Harrison; April 27, 1899 Philadelphia, Pennsylvania, U.S.
- Died: July 28, 1955 (aged 56) Adirondack Mountains, New York, U.S.
- Party: Democratic
- Education: University of Pennsylvania (BA, LLB)

Earl Grant Harrison (April 27, 1899 – July 28, 1955) was an American attorney, academic, and public servant. He worked on behalf of displaced persons in the aftermath of the Second World War, when he brought attention to the plight of Jewish refugees in a report, commonly known as the Harrison Report, that he produced for President Harry S. Truman. He was Dean of the University of Pennsylvania Law School from 1944 to 1948. He also had a distinguished career as an attorney in the Philadelphia area and was a name partner in the law firm of Schnader Harrison Segal & Lewis LLP.

== Early life and education ==
Harrison was born in the Frankford section of Philadelphia, Pennsylvania, on April 27, 1899, the son of grocer Joseph Layland Harrison (born in England) and stock-company Scotch-Irish actress Anna MacMullen (born in Northern Ireland). During World War I he was a Second Lieutenant of Infantry in 1918. He graduated from Frankford High School and earned his A.B from University of Pennsylvania as a valedictorian in 1920, and his LLB from the University of Pennsylvania Law School in 1923, where he was Case Editor of the University of Pennsylvania Law Review. He practiced law at the firm of Saul, Ewing, Remick, and Saul from 1923 to 1945, becoming a partner in 1932. In 1944 he became Dean of the University of Pennsylvania Law School.

== Government career ==
Harrison served in the administration of President Franklin D. Roosevelt, first as Director of Alien Registration in the United States Department of Justice for six months from July 1940 to January 1941. He was the United States Commissioner of Immigration and Naturalization from 1942 to 1944. During his tenure, the United States Immigration and Naturalization Service experienced significant reform and restructuring following its transfer from the Department of Labor to the Department of Justice.

== Harrison Report ==
President Roosevelt appointed him the U.S. representative on the Intergovernmental Commission on Refugees on March 15, 1945. He became Vice-President of the University of Pennsylvania and dean of its law school the same year. On June 22, President Truman asked Harrison to conduct an inspection tour of camps holding displaced persons (DPs) in Europe. He left in early July as the head of a small delegation that split up to visit more than two dozens camps for DPs. He produced a report on his findings dated August 24.

== Later years ==
In the spring of 1946, Harrison testified on behalf of a black student denied admission to the University of Texas Law School and isolated in a one-student school in the case of Sweatt v. Painter, a forerunner of Brown v. Board of Education.

Harrison resigned as dean in 1948, effective August 31, when the University of Pennsylvania's board of trustees named Harold Stassen university president, a post for which Harrison had been considered a likely candidate. He joined the law firm of Schnader Harrison Segal & Lewis in 1948 as a name partner, where he worked until his death in 1955.

== Other activities ==
Harrison was recognized for his unfailing responsiveness to the needs of the community and his dedication to public service. He was described by his contemporaries as "spare-framed, square-jawed, red haired," "a Roosevelt Republican," and "an almost indefatigable worker." In addition to his work for the United States government and his professional career, he was an officer and director of the World Affairs Council of Philadelphia and general campaign chairman of the Philadelphia United War Chest, a predecessor of the United Way. Harrison also served as director of the Philadelphia Area Council of the National Conference of Christians and Jews, the American Civil Liberties Union and the NAACP. He was a trustee of the Carnegie Endowment for International Peace and of the University of Pennsylvania. He was considered for nomination as a candidate for governor of Pennsylvania in 1946.

He died on July 28, 1955 during a holiday to the Adirondack Mountains.

Political offices
Preceded by Lemuel Schofield	Commissioner of the Immigration and Naturalization Service; 1942–1944	Succeeded by Ugo Carusi
Academic offices
Preceded by Edwin R. Keedy	Dean of the University of Pennsylvania Law School; 1945–1948	Succeeded by Owen Roberts
