= Orientation and Mobility =

Training for the blind and visually impaire

A 1964 educational film on O&M and vocational rehabilitation made with assistance from the California Department of Rehabilitation.

Orientation and Mobility, or O&M, is a profession which focuses on instructing individuals who are blind or visually impaired with safe and effective travel through their environment. Individual O&M specialists can work for schools, government agencies or work as private contractors. The Academy for Certification of Vision Rehabilitation and Education Professionals (ACVREP) offers certification for vision rehabilitation professionals in the United States.

== History ==
Orientation and Mobility training began after World War II, when techniques were developed to help blind veteransr. Soldiers who had been blinded in battle were sent to recuperate at Valley Forge General Hospital before entering Avon Old Farms Convalescent Hospital, the U.S. Army's former experimental rehabilitation center for blind soldiers in Avon, Connecticut. In the 1960s, universities started training programs for Orientation and Mobility specialists who were to work with adults and school-age children. In the 1980s, the O&M field recognized the benefit of providing services to preschool-aged children, and began to do so. Today, O&M specialists have developed strategies and approaches for serving even younger populations so that O&M training may begin in infancy.

== Techniques and training ==
An Orientation and Mobility (O&M) Specialist provides training that is designed to develop or relearn the skills and concepts a blind or visually impaired person needs to travel safely and independently through his or her environment. O&M specialists provide services across the life span, teaching infants and children in preschool and school programs, as well as adults in a variety of community-based and rehabilitation settings. Although O&M specialists are primarily responsible for O&M training, their work may not always be done directly with the child. When the child is very young, for example, the O&M may provide consultation to the teacher of students with blindness or visual impairment, vision rehabilitation therapists, occupational therapists, physical therapists, early intervention specialists and the family.

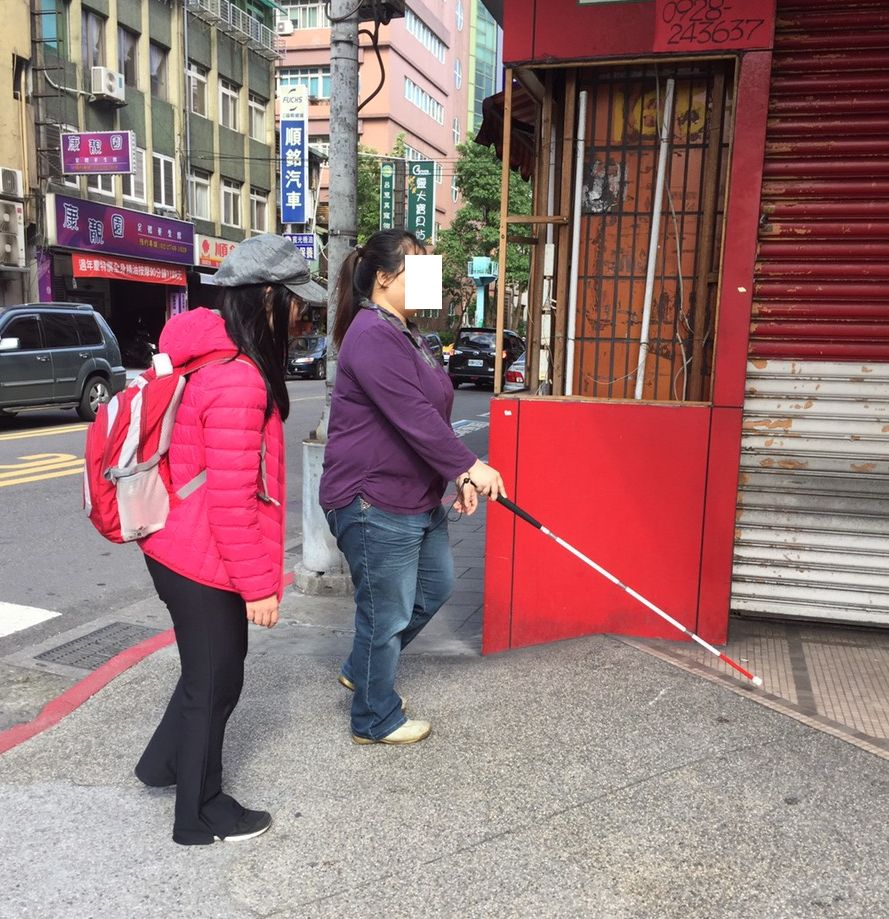
Blind person learning to use a cane

O&M training focuses on cues that can be observed by a blind or visually impaired person to allow them to understand their location and how to navigate between familiar locations. O&M training is complex in structure and wide in scope. All O&M specialists in the United States who are employed with government agencies are required to obtain certification from ACVREP. O&M certification preparation programs are relatively few in number throughout the United States and in general. Techniques communicated to the trainee vary based on the trainee's life situation. For example, techniques for navigating city streets would be irrelevant for a trainee living in a rural area, and would be skipped.

O&M services are commonly sought multiple times through the life of a blind or visually impaired person, because they are specific to certain locations, such as homes, workplaces and other necessary destinations that are prone to change throughout life. In the United States, O&M services are typically provided by state governments as part of larger vocational rehabilitation programs. In Texas, the Texas Workforce Commission contracts with individual O&M specialists and companies employing several O&M specialists in order to provide services to blind and visually impaired individuals at no cost to them, with the goal that the skills gained through such training will enable the blind or visually impaired person to gain stable employment in the future.

Common techniques taught include cane travel, trailing, locating dropped objects, and navigating street crossings.

A systematic review trying to determine the best type of O&M training for people with low vision did not find any significant differences when comparing O&M training delivered by a trained volunteer versus physical exercise, but they had little power to do so because of the small sample size and poor methodological quality.

== See also ==
- Travel training, service for those with intellectual or developmental disability
