= Lemuel Braddock Schofield =

American lawyer

Lemuel Schofield

Commissioner of the Immigration and Naturalization Service
- In office October 1, 1940 – July 19, 1942
- President: Franklin Roosevelt
- Preceded by: James Houghteling
- Succeeded by: Earl G. Harrison

Personal details
- Born: Lemuel Braddock Schofield; October 21, 1892 Warren, Pennsylvania, U.S.
- Died: July 3, 1955 (aged 62) Phoenixville, Pennsylvania, U.S.
- Education: University of Pennsylvania (BA, LLB)

Lemuel Braddock Schofield was born in Warren, Pennsylvania, in 1892. He received his undergraduate degree from the University of Pennsylvania, graduated from its law school in 1916, and was admitted to the Pennsylvania Bar that year.

Schofield joined the U.S. Army during World War I. He served in the Infantry, rising to the rank of major. Following the Armistice, Schofield returned to private law practice.

A prominent Philadelphia attorney, Schofield specialized in criminal law, representing clients in high-profile cases. He also held many public offices including Assistant District Attorney for Philadelphia from 1919 to 1926, the city's Director of Public Safety in the late 1920s, and Special Assistant to the U.S. Attorney General.

Schofield led the U.S. Immigration and Naturalization Service (INS) during its transition from the Department of Labor to the Department of Justice and through the opening years of World War II. During his tenure, INS grew significantly in size and assumed many new wartime national security duties. While Commissioner, Schofield oversaw the Alien Registration program, which began in the fall of 1940 after passage of the Smith Act, and the internment of enemy aliens.

After leaving federal service, Schofield returned to his private law practice and taught at the University of Pennsylvania and Temple law schools. Schofield died at the age of 63 at his home near Phoenixville, Pennsylvania, on July 3, 1955.

Schofield was attorney for the defense of John J. O'Malley in the O'Malley Case.

Political offices
Preceded by James Houghteling	Commissioner of the Immigration and Naturalization Service; 1940–1942	Succeeded by Earl G. Harrison
