= United States Immigration and Naturalization Service =

U.S. federal government agency (1933–2003)

- Seal of the U.S. Immigration and Naturalization Service

- Flag of the U.S. Immigration and Naturalization Service

Agency overview
- Formed: June 10, 1933; 93 years ago
- Dissolved: 2003
- Superseding agency: USCIS, ICE, CBP
- Jurisdiction: U.S. federal government
- Headquarters: Washington, D.C., U.S.
- Parent agency: Department of Justice
- Website: ins.gov (archived)

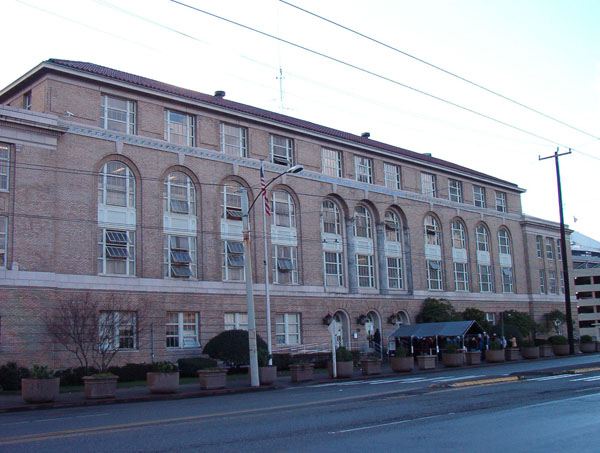
Old INS building in Seattle

The United States Immigration and Naturalization Service (INS) was a United States federal government agency under the United States Department of Labor from 1933 to 1940 and under the United States Department of Justice from 1940 to 2003.

Referred to by some as former INS and by others as legacy INS, the agency ceased to exist under that name on March 1, 2003, when most of its functions were transferred to three new entities – United States Citizenship and Immigration Services (USCIS), U.S. Immigration and Customs Enforcement (ICE), and U.S. Customs and Border Protection (CBP) – within the newly created United States Department of Homeland Security (DHS), as part of a major government reorganization following the September 11 attacks of 2001.

Prior to 1933, there were separate offices administering immigration and naturalization matters, known as the Bureau of Immigration and the Bureau of Naturalization, respectively. The INS was established on June 10, 1933, merging these previously separate areas of administration. In 1890, the federal government, rather than the individual states, regulated immigration into the United States, and the Immigration Act of 1891 established a Commissioner of Immigration in the Treasury Department. Reflecting changing governmental concerns, immigration was transferred to the purview of the United States Department of Commerce and Labor after 1903 and the Department of Labor after 1913. In 1940, with increasing concern about national security, immigration and naturalization was organized under the authority of the Department of Justice.

In 2003 the administration of immigration services, including permanent residence, naturalization, asylum, and other functions, became the responsibility of the Bureau of Citizenship and Immigration Services (BCIS), which existed under that name only for a short time before changing to the United States Citizenship and Immigration Services (USCIS). The investigative and enforcement functions of the INS (including investigations, deportation, and intelligence) were combined with the U.S. Customs investigators to create U.S. Immigration and Customs Enforcement (ICE). The border functions of the INS, which included the Border Patrol and INS Inspectors, were combined with U.S. Customs Inspectors to create U.S. Customs and Border Protection (CBP).

== Mission ==
The INS (Immigration and Naturalization Service) administered federal immigration laws and regulations including the Immigration and Nationality Act (Title 8, United States Code). Its officers inspected foreigners arriving at an official Port of Entry (POE), detecting and deterring illegal entry between the ports (with the assistance of the Border Patrol, a component of the INS) and by sea, and conducting investigations of criminal and administrative violations of the Act. The INS also adjudicated applications for permanent residency ("green cards"), change of status, naturalization (the process by which an alien [foreign-born person] becomes a citizen), and similar matters.

== Structure ==
The INS was led by a commissioner, who was appointed by the President and reported to the Attorney General in the Department of Justice. The INS worked closely with the United Nations, the Department of State, and the Department of Health and Human Services. The INS was a large and complex organization with four main divisions: Programs, Field Operations, Policy and Planning, and Management.

The operational functions of the INS included the Programs and Field Operations divisions. The Programs division was responsible for handling all the functions involved with enforcement and examinations, including the arrest, detaining, and deportation of illegal immigrants as well as controlling illegal and legal entry.

The Field Operations division was responsible for overseeing INS' many offices operating throughout the country and the world. The Field Operations division implemented policies and handled tasks for its three regional offices, which in turn oversaw 33 districts and 21 border areas throughout the country. Internationally, the Field Operations division oversaw the Headquarters Office of International Affairs which in turn oversaw 16 offices outside the country.

Managerial functions of the INS included the Policy and Planning and Management divisions. The Office of Policy and Planning coordinated all information for the INS and communicated with other cooperating government agencies and the public. The office was divided into three areas: the Policy Division; the Planning Division; and the Evaluation and Research Center. The second managerial division, called the Management division, was responsible for maintaining the overall mission of the INS throughout its many offices and providing administrative services to these offices. These duties were handled by the offices of Information Resources Management, Finance, Human Resources and Administration, and Equal Employment Opportunity.

== History ==
Shortly after the U.S. Civil War, some states started to pass their own immigration laws, which prompted the U.S. Supreme Court to rule in 1876 that immigration was a federal responsibility. The Immigration Act of 1891 established an Office of the Superintendent of Immigration within the Treasury Department. This office was responsible for admitting, rejecting, and processing all immigrants seeking admission to the United States and for implementing national immigration policy. 'Immigrant Inspectors', as they were called then, were stationed at major U.S. ports of entry collecting manifests of arriving passengers. Its largest station was located on Ellis Island in New York Harbor. Among other things, a 'head tax' of fifty cents was collected on each immigrant.

Paralleling some contemporary immigration concerns, in the early 1900s Congress's primary interest in immigration was to protect American workers and wages: the reason it had become a federal concern in the first place. This made immigration more a matter of commerce than revenue. In 1903, Congress transferred the Bureau of Immigration to the newly created (now-defunct) Department of Commerce and Labor, and on June 10, 1933, the agency was established as the Immigration and Naturalization Service.

After World War I, Congress attempted to stem the flow of immigrants, still mainly coming from Europe, by passing a law in 1921 and the Immigration Act of 1924 limiting the number of newcomers by assigning a quota to each nationality based upon its representation in previous U.S. census figures. Each year, the U.S. State Department issued a limited number of visas; only those immigrants who could present valid visas were permitted entry.

There were a number of predecessor agencies to INS between 1891 and 1933. The Immigration and Naturalization Service (INS) was formed in 1933 by a merger of the Bureau of Immigration and the Bureau of Naturalization.

Both those bureaus, as well as the newly created INS, were controlled by the Department of Labor. President Franklin Roosevelt moved the INS from the Department of Labor to the Department of Justice in 1940, citing a need for "more effective control over aliens" as the United States moved closer to joining World War II.

By July 1941, Justice Department officials had decided that the INS would oversee the internment of enemy aliens arrested by the FBI should the U.S. enter the war, and immediately after the attack on Pearl Harbor these plans went into effect. By December 10, three days after the attack, the INS had 1,291 Japanese, 857 German, and 147 Italian nationals in custody. These "enemy aliens," many of whom had resided in the United States for decades, were arrested without warrants or formal charges. They were held in immigration stations and various requisitioned sites, often for months, before receiving a hearing (without the benefit of legal counsel or defense witnesses) and being released, paroled, or transferred to a Department of Justice internment camp. Starting in 1942, the INS also interned German, Italian, and Japanese Latin Americans deported from Peru and other countries. It is estimated that 17,477 persons of Japanese ancestry, 11,507 of German ancestry, 2,730 of Italian ancestry, and 185 others were interned by the Immigration and Naturalization Service during the war.

In November 1979, Attorney General Benjamin Civiletti announced that INS raids would only take place at places of work, not at residences where suspected illegal immigrants were suspected of living.

=== Agency succession ===
The agency names and overseeing departments are listed below.

Agency	Department	Start	End
Office of Immigration	Treasury	1891	1903
Bureau of Immigration	Commerce and Labor	1903	1906
Bureau of Immigration and Naturalization	Commerce and Labor	1906	1913
Bureau of Immigration	Labor	1913	1933
Bureau of Naturalization	Labor	1913	1933
Immigration and Naturalization Service	Labor	1933	1940
Immigration and Naturalization Service	Justice	1940	2003
Citizenship and Immigration Services	Homeland Security	2003	present
Customs and Border Protection	Homeland Security	2003	present
Immigration and Customs Enforcement	Homeland Security	2003	present

== List of commissioners ==
A list of former INS commissioners and its predecessors is below.

Denotes acting capacity.

Superintendents of Immigration (1891–1895)

Name	Start	End	President(s)
William Owen	July 1, 1891	April 7, 1893	Benjamin Harrison (1889–1893)
Herman Stump	April 8, 1893	March 1, 1895	Grover Cleveland (1893–1897)

Commissioners General of Immigration (1895–1933)

Name	Start	End	President(s)
Herman Stump	March 2, 1895	June 30, 1897	Grover Cleveland (1893–1897)
Terence Powderly	July 1, 1897	June 24, 1902	William McKinley (1897–1901)
Terence Powderly	July 1, 1897	June 24, 1902	Theodore Roosevelt (1901–1909)
Frank Sargent	June 25, 1902	September 4, 1908	Theodore Roosevelt (1901–1909)
Daniel Keefe	July 1, 1909	May 31, 1913	William Taft (1909–1913)
Anthony Caminetti	June 1, 1913	March 13, 1921	Woodrow Wilson (1913–1921)
William Husband	March 15, 1921	May 15, 1925	Warren Harding (1921–1923)
William Husband	March 15, 1921	May 15, 1925	Calvin Coolidge (1923–1929)
Harry Hull	May 16, 1925	April 26, 1933	Calvin Coolidge (1923–1929)
Harry Hull	May 16, 1925	April 26, 1933	Herbert Hoover (1929–1933)
Daniel MacCormack	April 27, 1933	August 9, 1933	Franklin Roosevelt (1933–1945)

Commissioners of Naturalization (1913–1933)

Name	Start	End	President(s)
Richard Campbell	March 4, 1913	December 21, 1922	Woodrow Wilson (1913–1921)
Richard Campbell	March 4, 1913	December 21, 1922	Warren Harding (1921–1923)
Raymond Crist	January 1, 1923	August 9, 1933	Warren Harding (1921–1923)
Raymond Crist	January 1, 1923	August 9, 1933	Calvin Coolidge (1923–1929)
Raymond Crist	January 1, 1923	August 9, 1933	Herbert Hoover (1929–1933)
Raymond Crist	January 1, 1923	August 9, 1933	Franklin Roosevelt (1933–1945)

Commissioners of Immigration and Naturalization Services (1933–2003)

Name	Start	End	President(s)
Daniel MacCormack	August 10, 1933	January 1, 1937	Franklin Roosevelt (1933–1945)
James Houghteling	August 26, 1937	July 31, 1940	Franklin Roosevelt (1933–1945)
Lemuel Schofield	October 1, 1940	July 19, 1942	Franklin Roosevelt (1933–1945)
Earl Harrison	July 20, 1942	July 20, 1944	Franklin Roosevelt (1933–1945)
Ugo Carusi	January 9, 1945	August 26, 1947	Franklin Roosevelt (1933–1945)
Ugo Carusi	January 9, 1945	August 26, 1947	Harry Truman (1945–1953)
Watson Miller	August 27, 1947	June 9, 1950	Harry Truman (1945–1953)
Argyle Mackey	April 23, 1951	May 23, 1954	Harry Truman (1945–1953)
Argyle Mackey	April 23, 1951	May 23, 1954	Dwight Eisenhower (1953–1961)
Joe Swing	May 24, 1954	January 5, 1962	Dwight Eisenhower (1953–1961)
Joe Swing	May 24, 1954	January 5, 1962	John F. Kennedy (1961–1963)
Raymond Farrell	February 5, 1962	March 31, 1973	John F. Kennedy (1961–1963)
Raymond Farrell	February 5, 1962	March 31, 1973	Lyndon Johnson (1963–1969)
Raymond Farrell	February 5, 1962	March 31, 1973	Richard Nixon (1969–1974)
Leonard Chapman	November 29, 1973	May 12, 1977	Richard Nixon (1969–1974)
Leonard Chapman	November 29, 1973	May 12, 1977	Gerald Ford (1974–1977)
Leonel Castillo	May 13, 1977	October 1, 1979	Jimmy Carter (1977–1981)
Alan Nelson	February 22, 1982	June 16, 1989	Ronald Reagan (1981–1989)
Gene McNary	October 26, 1989	January 20, 1993	George H. W. Bush (1989–1993)
Doris Meissner	October 18, 1993	November 18, 2000	Bill Clinton (1993–2001)
James Ziglar	August 6, 2001	November 30, 2002	George W. Bush (2001–2009)
Michael Garcia; Acting	November 30, 2002	March 1, 2003	George W. Bush (2001–2009)

== INS in popular culture ==
The work of the immigration service has been dramatized or depicted in literature, music, art, and theatre. Films using its work as a theme include The Immigrant (1917), The Strong Man (1926), Ellis Island (1936), Paddy O'Day (1936), Gateway (1938), Secret Service of the Air (1939), Exile Express (1939), Five Came Back (1939), Illegal Entry (1949), Deported (1950), Gambling House (1951), Born in East L.A. (1987), Die Hard (1988), Coneheads (1993), My Fellow Americans (1996), Men in Black (1997), Fun with Dick and Jane (2005) and Ip Man 4: The Finale (2019).

== See also ==
- U.S. Citizenship and Immigration Services
- U.S. Immigration and Customs Enforcement
- U.S. Customs and Border Protection
- Immigration
- Asylum in the United States
- Well-Founded Fear
