= Laurence Howard Eldredge =

Laurence Howard Ledredge
- Born: March 18, 1902; Cold Spring, New Jersey, U.S.
- Died: July 17, 1982 (aged 80)
- Education: Lafayette College (BS); University of Pennsylvania (LLB)
- Occupations: Lawyer; educator; author
- Spouse: Helen Biddle Gans (m. 1926)
- Children: 3
- Parent(s): Irvin H. Eldredge; Mary Louise Benton

Laurence Howard Eldredge (March 18, 1902 – July 17, 1982) was an American lawyer, educator and author. His specialty was the law of torts.

== Early life and education ==
Eldredge was born in Cold Spring, Cape May County, New Jersey on March 18, 1902 to Irvin H. and Mary Louise (Benton) Eldridge. He received a Bachelor of Science from Lafayette College in 1924 and a Bachelor of Laws from the University of Pennsylvania in 1927. In 1970, he completed a Doctor of Letters.

== Career ==
Eldredge was a reporter for the Public Ledger in Philadelphia from 1924–25 and then a writer of syndicated news articles. He was admitted to the Pennsylvania Bar in 1927 and worked as an associated with Montgomery and McCracken until 1938. He was a member of the firm Norris, Lex, Hart & Eldredge from 1944 to 1956.

Eldredge was a professor of law at Temple University from 1928–33 and an adjunct professor from 1947-52. He was Special Deputy Attorney General of Pennsylvania from 1948 to 1949.

During the 1970s Eldridge taught torts at Hastings College of Law in San Francisco as a member of that school's 65 Club consisting of professors who were past retirement age and unable to teach elsewhere.

== Bibliography ==
- Eldredge on Modern Tort Problems, 1941
- Pennsylvania Annotations to Restatement, Torts, Vols. I and II, 1938
- Trials of a Philadelphia Lawyer, 1968
- The Law of Defamation, 1978.
- Revising reporter, Restatement of the Law of Torts, 1946-47.
- Reporter of decisions Supreme Court of Pennsylvania, 1942-68.
- Editor: Pennsylvania Bar Assn. Quar., 1938-42.

== Personal life ==
Eldredge married Helen Biddle Gans on September 30, 1926 and they had three daughters.
