= Hans Yost Creek =

Physical characteristics
- Source
  - location: large valley in Foster Township, Schuylkill County, Pennsylvania
  - elevation: 1,491 ft (454 m)
- Mouth
  - location: Deep Creek in Barry Township, Schuylkill County, Pennsylvania near Weishample
  - coordinates: 40°41′09″N 76°26′15″W
  - elevation: 787 ft (240 m)
- Length: 3.52 mi (5.66 km)
- Basin size: 3.52 mi^{2} (9.1 km^{2})

Basin features
- Progression: Deep Creek → Mahantango Creek → Susquehanna River → Chesapeake Bay

Hans Yost Creek is a tributary of Deep Creek in Schuylkill County, Pennsylvania, in the United States. It is approximately 3.4 miles (5.5 km) long and flows through Foster Township and Barry Township. The watershed of the creek has an area of 3.52 square miles (9.1 km^{2}). The creek is designated as an impaired waterbody, with the causes being metals and pH and the probable source being abandoned mine drainage. It has no named tributaries, but two abandoned mine discharges flow into it. The creek's watershed was extensively mined in the late 1800s and early 1900s, but the only remaining active mining permits are for remining.

== Course ==
Hans Yost Creek begins in a large valley in Foster Township. It flows in a westerly direction through the valley for several tenths of a mile, entering Barry Township. The creek then turns southwest for a short distance before turning west. After a few tenths of a mile, it turns southwest for several tenths of a mile, entering a much narrower valley. The creek eventually turns in a westerly direction for several tenths of a mile — briefly turning northwest and then southwest along the way — before reaching the end of its valley and turning northwest. A short distance further downstream, the creek reaches its confluence with Deep Creek.

Hans Yost Creek joins Deep Creek 14.96 miles (24.08 km) upstream of its mouth.

=== Tributaries ===
Hans Yost Creek has no named tributaries, nor are any tributaries visible on the United States Geological Survey map of the Tremont quadrangle. However, a few small intermittent streams do flow into the creek's headwaters.

== Hydrology ==
Hans Yost Creek is designated as an impaired waterbody for its entire length. The causes of the impairment are metals and pH and the probable source of impairment is abandoned mine drainage. There are two abandoned mine discharges in the creek's watershed. One is known as the Moser Mine Pool Discharge and enters the creek in its upper reaches. The estimated flow of this discharge is 0.259 million gallons per day. The other is known locally as Rattling Run and is formed from the Collapsed Tunnel Discharge and the Buck Mountain Vein Overflow Discharge. This discharge enters the creek in its lower reaches.

The average discharge of Hans Yost Creek above the Moser Discharge has been estimated to be 0.259 million gallons per day, while below the discharge, it has been estimated at 0.518 million gallons per day. Above the Rattling Run discharge, the creek's discharge was found to average at 1.49 million gallons per day, while below the discharge, it was 3.59 million gallons per day.

In the 1980s and/or 1990s, the iron concentration in Hans Yost Creek upstream of the Moser Discharge ranged from 0.07 to 1.12 milligrams per liter (7.0×10^{−5} to 0.001119 oz/cu ft), with an average of 0.56 milligrams per liter (0.00056 oz/cu ft). Below the discharge, it ranged from less than 0.04 milligrams per liter (4.0×10^{−5} oz/cu ft) to 2.3 milligrams per liter (0.0023 oz/cu ft), with an average of 1.05 milligrams per liter (0.00105 oz/cu ft). Above the Rattling Run discharge, the iron concentration ranged from 0.4 to 23.8 milligrams per liter (0.00040 to 0.02377 oz/cu ft), with an average of 15.22 milligrams per liter (0.01520 oz/cu ft). Below this discharge, the concentration ranged between 0.4 and 6.2 milligrams per liter (0.00040 and 0.00619 oz/cu ft), with an average of 2.68 milligrams per liter (0.00268 oz/cu ft).

The manganese concentration in Hans Yost Creek upstream of the Moser Discharge ranged from less than 0.03 milligrams per liter (3.0×10^{−5} oz/cu ft) to 0.92 milligrams per liter (0.00092 oz/cu ft), with an average of 0.54 milligrams per liter (0.00054 oz/cu ft). Below the discharge, it ranged from 0.16 to 0.87 milligrams per liter (0.00016 to 0.00087 oz/cu ft) with an average of 0.53 milligrams per liter (0.00053 oz/cu ft). Above the Rattling Run discharge, the manganese concentration ranged from 0.28 to 2.7 milligrams per liter (0.00028 to 0.00270 oz/cu ft), with an average of 1.78 milligrams per liter (0.00178 oz/cu ft). Below this discharge, the concentration ranged between 0.28 and 3.5 milligrams per liter (0.00028 and 0.00350 oz/cu ft), with an average of 1.11 milligrams per liter (0.00111 oz/cu ft).

== Geography, geology, and watershed ==
The elevation near the mouth of Hans Yost Creek is 787 feet (240 m) above sea level. The elevation near the creek's source is 1,491 feet (454 m) above sea level.

Part of a steep valley between Broad Mountain and Mahantango Mountain is drained by Hans Yost Creek. The creek flows through the Southern Anthracite Coal Field.

The watershed of Hans Yost Creek has an area of 3.52 square miles (9.1 km^{2}). The creek is entirely within the United States Geological Survey quadrangle of Tremont. Its mouth is located within 1 mile (1.6 km) of Weishample.

The headwaters of Hans Yost Creek flow through forested land and are difficult to access.

The watershed of Hans Yost Creek is located 39 miles (63 km) northeast of Harrisburg and 4 miles (6.4 km) north of Tremont. Pennsylvania Route 901 and Interstate 81 are partially in the vicinity of the creek's watershed.

== History ==
Hans Yost Creek was entered into the Geographic Names Information System on August 2, 1979. Its identifier in the Geographic Names Information System is 1176486. The creek is also known as Hanyost Creek. This variant name appears in a Pennsylvania Department of Transportation map of Schuylkill County dating to 1975.

The watershed of Hans Yost Creek experienced extensive mining during the late 1800s and early 1900s. There are still active mining permits in the watershed, as of 2001. However, they are remining permits and thus do not involve discharges into the creek. In 1976, the Schuylkill County Sportsmen's Association began a drive to construct a fish nursery with a capacity for 30,000 trout on the creek. This was despite the M.S.W. Coal Company proposing to mine at the headwaters of Deep Creek and discharge treated water into the watershed of Hans Yost Creek; the Schuylkill County Sportsmen's Association opted to believe that the coal mining operation would not pollute anything.

At least two biological studies have been conducted on Hans Yost Creek. In 1972, the Pennsylvania Department of Environmental Resources found the macroinvertebrate community to be satisfactory. However, in 1997, a study by the Pennsylvania Department of Environmental Protection found the creek to be impaired. The Tri-Valley Watershed Association, which operates in the watersheds of Deep Creek, Pine Creek, and Mahantango Creek, has dosed the Moser Mine Pool Discharge with limestone to increase the creek's alkalinity. Treatment for the lower reaches of Hans Yost Creek are also being considered by the Tri-Valley Watershed Association.

== Biology ==
The drainage basin of Hans Yost Creek is classified as a Coldwater Fishery. The designated use for Hans Yost Creek is aquatic life.

In the 1970s, Hans Yost Creek was found to have "good stream conditions", with the abandoned mine drainage discharges causing little or no impact to the macroinvertebrate community in the creek.

== See also ==
- List of rivers of Pennsylvania
