= Rausch Creek (Pine Creek tributary) =

Physical characteristics
- Source
  - location: confluence of East Branch Rausch Creek and West Branch Rausch Creek between two mountains in Hegins Township, Schuylkill County, Pennsylvania
  - elevation: 875 ft (267 m)
- Mouth
  - location: Pine Creek on the border of Valley View, in Hegins Township, Schuylkill County, Pennsylvania
  - coordinates: 40°38′22″N 76°33′29″W
  - elevation: 676 ft (206 m)
- Length: 1.7 mi (2.7 km)

Basin features
- Progression: Pine Creek → Mahantango Creek → Susquehanna River → Chesapeake Bay
- Tributaries: East Branch Rausch Creek, West Branch Rausch Creek

Rausch Creek is a tributary of Pine Creek in Schuylkill County, Pennsylvania, in the United States. It is approximately 1.7 miles (2.7 km) long and flows through Hegins Township. The watershed of the creek has an area of 9.55 square miles (24.7 km^{2}). The creek has two named tributaries: East Branch Rausch Creek and West Branch Rausch Creek. Rausch Creek is designated as an impaired waterbody, with the cause of the impairment being metals and the probable source being abandoned mine drainage.

Rausch Creek flows through a water gap, and several mountains are in the vicinity of the creek. The watershed of Rausch Creek experienced extensive deep mining in the early 20th century. There are still several active mining permits in the watershed. A treatment plant was constructed for the creek by the early 1970s.

== Course ==
Rausch Creek begins at the confluence of the tributaries East Branch Rausch Creek and West Branch Rausch Creek in between two mountains in Hegins Township. It flows in a northerly direction for approximately a mile, passing through a water gap. The creek then reaches the end of the water gap and turns north-northwest, flowing through the valley of Pine Creek. Several tenths of a mile further downstream, it reaches its confluence with Pine Creek on the border of the census-designated place of Valley View.

Rausch Creek joins Pine Creek 13.32 miles (21.44 km) upstream of its mouth.

=== Tributaries ===
Rausch Creek has two named tributaries: East Branch Rausch Creek and West Branch Rausch Creek. West Branch Rausch Creek joins Rausch Creek 1.67 miles (2.69 km) upstream of its mouth near Tower City and drains an area of 4.78 square miles (12.4 km^{2}).

== Hydrology ==
Rausch Creek is designated as an impaired waterbody throughout its entire length. The cause of the impairment is metals and the probable source is abandoned mine drainage. The creek is a major contributor of abandoned mine drainage to Pine Creek, the largest tributary of Mahantango Creek. The iron load in the creek requires a 92 percent reduction to meet the creek's total maximum daily load requirements, while the manganese load requires a 78 percent reduction and the aluminum load requires an 83 percent reduction. The acidity load require a 91 percent reduction.

The discharge of Rausch Creek can be as high as 150,000,000 US gallons (570,000 m^{3}) per day during heavy rainstorms. A study found the average discharge of the creek at the influent to the Rausch Creek Treatment Plant was 8,100,000 US gallons (31,000 m^{3}) per day, ranging from 3,000,000 to 17,000,000 US gallons (11,000 to 64,000 m^{3}) per day. The average discharge at the creek's effluent between 1981 and 1999 was 8,700,000 US gallons (33,000 m^{3}) per day.

The pH of Rausch Creek at the influent of the Rausch Creek Treatment Plant has been measured to range from 3.9 to 8.8, with an average of 5.44. At the effluent of the treatment plant, the pH ranged from 6.2 to 8.0, with an average of 6.60. At the influent, the alkalinity ranged from 0 to 24 milligrams per liter (0.000 to 0.024 oz/cu ft), with an average of 4.98 milligrams per liter (0.00497 oz/cu ft). The alkalinity concentration at the effluent ranged from 7 to 12.2 milligrams per liter (0.0070 to 0.0122 oz/cu ft) and averaged 9.82 milligrams per liter (0.00981 oz/cu ft).

At the influent of the Rausch Creek Treatment Plant, the iron concentration has been measured to range from 8.74 to 16.1 milligrams per liter (0.00873 to 0.01608 oz/cu ft), with an average of 12.28 milligrams per liter (0.01227 oz/cu ft). At the effluent, the iron concentration ranged from 0.27 to 1.64 milligrams per liter (0.00027 to 0.00164 oz/cu ft), with an average of 0.63 milligrams per liter (0.00063 oz/cu ft). At the influent of the treatment plant, the manganese concentration ranged from 1.46 to 4.02 milligrams per liter (0.00146 to 0.00402 oz/cu ft), with an average of 2.98 milligrams per liter (0.00298 oz/cu ft). The manganese concentration at the effluent ranged from 0.19 to 2.09 milligrams per liter (0.00019 to 0.00209 oz/cu ft), and averaged 1.04 milligrams per liter (0.00104 oz/cu ft). The aluminum concentration of the influent ranged from 0.776 to 4.86 milligrams per liter (0.000775 to 0.004854 oz/cu ft) and averaged 1.33 milligrams per liter (0.00133 oz/cu ft), while the effluent concentration ranged from less than 0.200 milligrams per liter (0.000200 oz/cu ft) to 0.61 milligrams per liter (0.00061 oz/cu ft).

== Geography and geology ==
The elevation near the mouth of Rausch Creek is 676 feet (206 m) above sea level. The elevation near the creek's source is 875 feet (267 m) above sea level.

Rausch Creek flows through a water gap known as Kohlers Gap (or Bear Gap), where it is flanked by steep slopes. A number of abandoned deep mine openings occur in this reach. The tributary East Branch Rausch Creek flows between Big Lick Mountain and Good Springs Mountain, while the tributary West Branch Rausch Creek flows between Big Lick Mountain and Bear Mountain.

There are five large abandoned mine pools in the watershed of Rausch Creek. They are known as Brookside, Good Spring No. 1, Good Spring No. 3, Markson, and Williamstown-Lykens. However, the last of these does not discharge into the watershed, but instead goes through the Big Lick Tunnel to the watershed of Wiconisco Creek, and the Good Spring No. 3 pool discharges into Good Spring Creek, a tributary of Swatara Creek. Abandoned mine drainage discharges provide the bulk of the flow of the streams in the watershed of Rausch Creek.

== Watershed and biology ==
The watershed of Rausch Creek has an area of 9.55 square miles (24.7 km^{2}). The mouth of the creek is in the United States Geological Survey quadrangle of Valley View. However, its source is in the quadrangle of Tower City. The creek's mouth is located at Valley View.

The watershed of Rausch Creek is situated in the southwestern part of Schuylkill County. The watershed can be accessed by taking Interstate 81 to US Route 209 and US Route 209 to State Route 4011. Most of the watershed of the creek is contained within the subwatersheds of the tributaries East Branch Rausch Creek and West Branch Rausch Creek. The watershed has been described as having "rugged contours", reducing the viability of development, but is suitable for mining, hunting, and lumbering.

The designated use of Rausch Creek is aquatic life. The creek is classified as a Coldwater Fishery. The mouth of the creek is on the border of a Wild Pheasant Recovery Area.

Open thickets have been observed in the vicinity of Rausch Creek. In the early 1940s, Menziesia pilosa was observed in these thickets.

== History ==
Rausch Creek was entered into the Geographic Names Information System on August 2, 1979. Its identifier in the Geographic Names Information System is 1184704.

A concrete slab bridge carrying State Route 4011 was constructed over Rausch Creek 1.7 miles (2.7 km) south of Valley View in 1912 and repaired in 1995. This bridge is 33.1 feet (10.1 m) long. Another bridge of the same type and length, and carrying the same road was also constructed over the creek 1.3 miles (2.1 km) south of Valley View in 1912 and was repaired in 1995. In 1960, a concrete tee beam bridge carrying Schwenks Road over the creek was built south of Valley View; this bridge is 26.9 feet (8.2 m) long. A steel stringer/multi-beam or girder bridge carrying T-474 (Gap School Road) was built over the creek in 1967 and is 22.0 feet (6.7 m) long.

Extensive deep mining took place in the watershed of Rausch Creek in the early 20th century. In particular, anthracite coal has been mined extensively in the watershed of the creek. In March 1969, the Pennsylvania Department of Mines and Mineral Resources commissioned Anthracite Research and Development Company, Inc. to devise a method to remedy abandoned mine drainage in the watershed. The Rausch Creek Treatment Plant was completed 0.8 miles (1.3 km) upstream of the mouth of the creek in 1973. The treatment plant was one of 16 abandoned mine drainage treatment plants constructed by the Commonwealth of Pennsylvania, the Pennsylvania Department of Environmental Protection, the Pennsylvania Department of Environmental Resources, and the Department of Mines & Mineral Industries in the Anthracite and Bituminous Regions between 1967 and 1992. It is designed to treat up to 16,000,000 US gallons (61,000 m^{3}) per day, though the creek's flow sometimes exceeds this during heavy rainstorms.

By the early 2000s, plans were underway to increase the capacity of the treatment plant on Rausch Creek to 20,000,000 US gallons (76,000 m^{3}) per day, while improving its efficiency. As of 2001, there are eight active mining permits in the watershed of Rausch Creek. Five of them have neither an NPDES permit nor an NPDES discharge, while one has a permit but no discharge, and two have neither permits nor discharges.

== See also ==
- Deep Creek (Pine Creek), next tributary of Pine Creek going downstream
- List of rivers of Pennsylvania
