= Rough and Ready, Pennsylvania =

Unincorporated community in Pennsylvania, US

Rough and Ready
- Unincorporated community
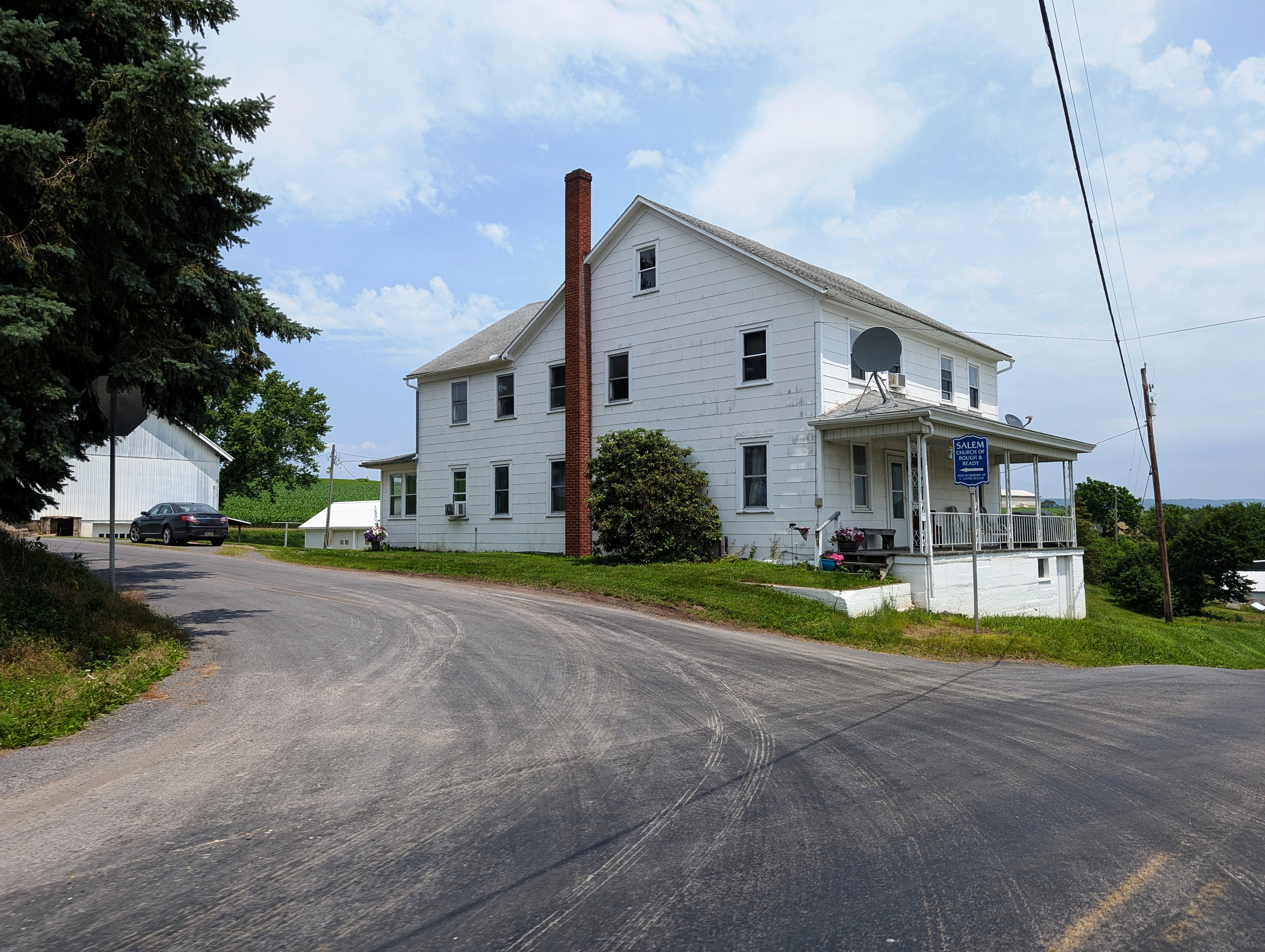
- House at the intersection of Ridge Road and Erdman Road

- Location within the U.S. state of Pennsylvania Rough and Ready (the United States)
- Coordinates: 40°40′46″N 76°37′40″W
- Country: United States
- State: Pennsylvania
- County: Schuylkill
- Elevation: 732 ft (223 m)
- Time zone: UTC-5 (Eastern (EST))
  - Summer (DST): UTC-4 (EDT)
- ZIP codes: 17941
- Area code: 570
- GNIS feature ID: 1204550

Rough and Ready is a cross-roads located in Upper Mahantongo Township, Schuylkill County, Pennsylvania, United States, west of Hepler, near the confluence of Little Mahantango Creek and Mahantango Creek, which flows west into the Susquehanna River. It uses the Klingerstown, Pennsylvania ZIP Code of 17941. The place, which consists of two homes and a church, was named for the gold-rush town of Rough and Ready, California, which in turn was named by a mining company also named in honor of Zachary Taylor's nickname, "Old Rough and Ready."
