= Snow Creek (Mahantango Creek tributary) =

Physical characteristics
- Source
  - location: hill in Upper Mahanoy Township, Northumberland County, Pennsylvania
  - elevation: 955 ft (291 m)
- Mouth
  - location: Mahantango Creek in Jordan Township, Northumberland County, Pennsylvania near Klingerstown
  - coordinates: 40°39′49″N 76°42′00″W
  - elevation: 512 ft (156 m)
- Length: 3.8 mi (6.1 km)

Basin features
- Progression: Mahantango Creek → Susquehanna River → Chesapeake Bay
- Tributaries
  - left: three unnamed tributaries
  - right: four unnamed tributaries

Snow Creek is a tributary of Mahantango Creek in Northumberland County, Pennsylvania, in the United States. It is approximately 3.8 miles (6.1 km) long and flows through Upper Mahanoy Township and Jordan Township. The watershed of the creek has an area of 4.72 square miles (12.2 km^{2}). The creek has no named tributaries and is not designated as an impaired waterbody in any stream segment.

== Course ==
Snow Creek begins on a hill in Upper Mahanoy Township. It flows south-southwest for a few tenths of a mile before turning south for a few tenths of a mile, passing through a small pond, reaching the bottom of the hill, and receiving an unnamed tributary from the left. The creek then turns west-southwest for a few tenths of a mile before receiving an unnamed tributary from the right and entering a valley. In the valley, it continues to flow west-southwest for more than a mile before entering Jordan Township. Upon entering this township, the creek gradually turns south for a few tenths of a mile, receiving one unnamed tributary from the right and one from the left. It then turns south-southwest for several tenths of a mile, receiving one unnamed tributary from the right and another from the left before turning southwest and crossing Klingerstown Road. A short distance further downstream, the creek receives another unnamed tributary from the right and reaches its confluence with Mahantango Creek on the border between Northumberland County and Schuylkill County.

Snow Creek joins Mahantango Creek 16.88 miles (27.17 km) upstream of its mouth.

== Hydrology, geography and geology ==
The elevation near the mouth of Snow Creek is 512 feet (156 m) above sea level. The elevation near the creek's source is 955 feet (291 m) above sea level.

As of 2004, no reach of Snow Creek or any of its unnamed tributaries are designated as impaired waterbodies.

== Watershed ==
The watershed of Snow Creek has an area of 4.72 square miles (12.2 km^{2}). The creek is entirely within the United States Geological Survey quadrangle of Klingerstown. Its mouth is located within 1 mile (1.6 km) of Klingerstown. There are approximately 10.75 miles (17.30 km) of streams in the creek's watershed.

A 6.4-mile (10.3 km) long greenway along Snow Creek has been proposed.

== History ==
Snow Creek was entered into the Geographic Names Information System on August 2, 1979. Its identifier in the Geographic Names Information System is 1187945.

A concrete tee beam bridge carrying State Route 3018 across Snow Creek was constructed 6 miles (9.7 km) east of Pillow in 1938 and is 35.1 feet (10.7 m) long.

== See also ==
- Deep Creek (Mahantango Creek), next tributary of Mahantango Creek going downstream
- Pine Creek (Mahantango Creek), next tributary of Mahantango Creek going upstream
- List of rivers of Pennsylvania
