= Little Mahantango Creek =

Physical characteristics
- Source
  - location: near Line Mountain in Eldred Township, Schuylkill County, Pennsylvania
  - elevation: 1,004 ft (306 m)
- Mouth
  - location: Mahnatango Creek in Upper Mahanoy Township, Pennsylvania near Valley View
  - coordinates: 40°40′26″N 76°36′54″W
  - elevation: 604 ft (184 m)
- Length: 9.6 mi (15.4 km)
- Basin size: 15.1 mi^{2} (39 km^{2})

Basin features
- Tributaries
  - left: four unnamed tributaries
  - right: thirteen unnamed tributaries

Little Mahantango Creek is a tributary of Mahantango Creek in Schuylkill County and Northumberland County, in Pennsylvania, in the United States. It is approximately 9.6 miles (15.4 km) long and flows through Eldred Township and Upper Mahantongo Township in Schuylkill County and Upper Mahanoy Township in Northumberland County. The watershed of the creek has an area of 15.1 square miles (39 km^{2}). The creek has many unnamed tributaries and sub-tributaries; all of them, as well as the main stem, are impaired. The cause of impairment in Little Mahantango Creek is sedimentation/siltation and the probable source of impairment is agriculture.

The main rock formations in the vicinity of Little Mahantango Creek include the Irish Valley Member, the Trimmers Rock Formation, the Duncannon Member, and the Sherman Creek Member. The main soils in the vicinity of the creek include the Leck Kill-Minersville-Calvin soil, the Berks-Weikert-Beddington soil, and the Hazelton-Dekalb-Buchnnan soil. The main land use near it is agricultural land, but forested land and developed land are also present. A number of bridges have been constructed across the creek.

== Course ==
Little Mahantango Creek begins near Line Mountain, in Eldred Township, Schuylkill County. It flows south-southeast for a short distance before turning west-southwest, receiving an unnamed tributary from the right. After several tenths of a mile, the creek turns south for a few tenths of a mile, receiving an unnamed tributary from the right and two unnamed tributaries from the left. It then flows in a generally west-southwesterly direction for a few miles, occasionally flowing west-northwest for short distances, and receiving one unnamed tributary from the right and two from the left before turning northwest. Several tenths of a mile further downstream, the creek turns west-northwest, receiving two more unnamed tributaries from the right (in the process crossing Pennsylvania Route 125) and entering Upper Mahanoy Township, Northumberland County.

Upon entering Northumberland County, Little Mahantango Creek soon receives an unnamed tributary from the right and turns south, reentering Eldred Township, Schuylkill County. The creek flows southwest for several tenths of a mile and receives an unnamed tributary from the right and another from the left before entering Upper Mahantongo Township, where it turns west-southwest, receiving another unnamed tributary from the right before turning west-northwest. A few tenths of a mile further downstream, the creek turns west-southwest for several tenths of a mile, receiving three unnamed tributaries from the right. It then turns south for a few tenths of a mile before turning west and then west-southwest, receiving two unnamed tributaries from the right. The creek then gradually turns south-southeast, receiving one more unnamed tributary from the right in the process. After several tenths of a mile of flowing south-southeast, it reaches its confluence with Mahantango Creek.

Little Mahantango Creek joins Mahantango Creek 23.24 miles (37.40 km) upstream of its mouth.

== Hydrology ==
Reaches of Little Mahantango Creek are designated as an impaired waterbody. The cause of the impairment is sedimentation/siltation and the probable source is agriculture. The entirety of the creek and all of its unnamed tributaries and sub-tributaries are designated as impaired.

In July 1998, the water temperature of Little Mahantango Creek near Pitman was once measured to be 20.7 °C (69.3 °F), while at Line Mountain, it was measured to be 19.8 °C (67.6 °F). The instantaneous discharge of the creek was 1.4 cubic feet per second (0.040 m^{3}/s) near Pitman and 1.9 cubic feet per second (0.054 m^{3}/s) at Line Mountain. The specific conductance was 199 micro-siemens per centimeter at 25 °C (77 °F) near Pitman and 188 micro-siemens per centimeter at 25 °C (77 °F) at Line Mountain. The concentration of nitrogen in nitrate in the creek was 7.06 milligrams per liter (0.00705 oz/cu ft) near Pitman and 6.98 milligrams per liter (0.00697 oz/cu ft) at Line Mountain.

== Geography and geology ==
The elevation near the mouth of Little Mahantango Creek is 604 feet (184 m) above sea level. The elevation near the creek's source is 1,004 feet (306 m) above sea level.

The geology surrounding most of the length of Little Mahantango Creek consists of the Irish Valley Member and the Trimmers Rock Formation. However, the Sherman Creek Member is present near parts of the creek's middle and upper reaches, as well as at the mouth. The geology at the headwaters of the creek consists of rock of the Duncannon Member.

The main soil occurring in the vicinity of Little Mahantango Creek is the Leck Kill-Minersville-Calvin soil. However, the Berks-Weikert-Beddington soil occurs near the middle reaches of the creek and the Hazelton-Dekalb-Buchanan soil occurs near its headwaters.

== Watershed ==
The watershed of Little Mahantango Creek has an area of 15.1 square miles (39 km^{2}). The mouth of the creek is in the United States Geological Survey quadrangle of Valley View. However, its source is in the quadrangle of Tremont. The creek's mouth is situated near Valley View.

The main land use in the vicinity of Little Mahantango Creek is agricultural land. However, there are some areas of forested land and some small patches of developed land as well.

The designated use for Little Mahantango Creek is aquatic life.

== History ==
Little Mahantango Creek was entered into the Geographic Names Information System on August 2, 1979. Its identifier in the Geographic Names Information System is 1192805.

In 1793, David Klock received a warranty deed for a 343-acre (139 ha) tract of land nicknamed "Beauty" on Little Mahantango Creek. Historically, there was a carding or fulling mill on the creek.

A steel stringer/multi-beam or girder bridge carrying Pennsylvania Route 125 was constructed across Little Mahantango Creek in 1932 and repaired in 1956. This bridge is 29.9 feet (9.1 m) long. A steel girder and floorbeam system bridge carrying State Route 4014 was constructed over the creek in 1949 and is 54.1 feet (16.5 m) long. In 1963, a steel stringer/multi-beam or girder bridge carrying Tannenbaum Road was constructed over the creek and is 29.9 feet (9.1 m) long. A concrete slab bridge carrying Mill Road across the creek was built in 1973 and is 32.2 feet (9.8 m) long. A concrete frame bridge carrying T-468 (Hepler Road) over the creek was built in 2009 and is 34.1 feet (10.4 m) long.

== See also ==
- Pine Creek (Mahantango Creek), next tributary of Mahantango Creek going downstream
- List of rivers of Pennsylvania
