= West Branch Rausch Creek =

Physical characteristics
- Source
  - location: Valley between Bear Mountain and Big Lick Mountain, in Hegins Township, Schuylkill County, Pennsylvania
  - elevation: 1,194 ft (364 m)
- Mouth
  - location: Rausch Creek in Hegins Township, Schuylkill County, Pennsylvania, near Tower City
  - coordinates: 40°37′05″N 76°33′00″W
  - elevation: 879 ft (268 m)
- Length: 3.7 mi (6.0 km)
- Basin size: 4.78 sq mi (12.4 km^{2})

Basin features
- Progression: Rausch Creek → Pine Creek → Mahantango Creek → Susquehanna River → Chesapeake Bay

West Branch Rausch Creek is a tributary of Rausch Creek in Schuylkill County, Pennsylvania. It is approximately 3.7 miles (6.0 km) long and flows through Hegins Township. The watershed of the creek has an area of 4.78 square miles (12.4 km^{2}). The creek is designated as an impaired waterbody due to metals from abandoned mine drainage. It has no named tributaries.

West Branch Rausch Creek primarily flows through a valley between two mountains: Bear Mountain and Big Lick Mountain. The dominant land use in the watershed of the creek is deciduous forest, although there are more than 100 acres (40 ha) each of mixed forest and disturbed land. Mining has been done in the watershed, and two mine pools are present within its boundaries, though one discharges into another watershed. At least one bridge has been constructed across the creek.

== Course ==
West Branch Rausch Creek begins in a large valley between Bear Mountain and Big Lick Mountain, in Hegins Township, near the Schuylkill County/Dauphin County line. It flows east-northeast for several tenths of a mile before passing through a wetland. From the eastern edge of the wetland, the creek continues flowing east-northeast for more than a mile. It then turns northeast for a few tenths of a mile, passing through two ponds, reaching the end of its valley, and joining East Branch Rausch Creek to form Rausch Creek.

West Branch Rausch Creek joins Rausch Creek 1.67 miles (2.69 km) upstream of its mouth.

== Hydrology ==
The entire length of West Branch Rausch Creek is designated as an impaired waterbody. The cause of the impairment is metals and the probable source is abandoned mine drainage. Despite being impacted by abandoned mine drainage, the creek is not impacted by sediment, unlike the nearby East Branch Rausch Creek.

The average discharge of West Branch Rausch Creek near its mouth is 4,100,000 US gallons (16,000 m^{3}) per day. The pH of the creek has been measured to range from 6.1 to 6.5, with an average of 6.3. The alkalinity concentration ranged from 19.0 to 30.0 milligrams per liter (0.0190 to 0.0300 oz/cu ft), with an average of 25.5 milligrams per liter (0.0255 oz/cu ft).

The iron concentration in West Branch Rausch Creek near its mouth ranges from 9.54 to 26.80 milligrams per liter (0.00953 to 0.02677 oz/cu ft), with an average of 15.14 milligrams per liter (0.01512 oz/cu ft). The concentration of manganese ranges from 1.19 to 1.89 milligrams per liter (0.00119 to 0.00189 oz/cu ft), with an average of 1.62 milligrams per liter (0.00162 oz/cu ft). The aluminum concentration ranges between less than 0.2 milligrams per liter (0.00020 oz/cu ft) and 1.02 milligrams per liter (0.00102 oz/cu ft), and averages 0.37 milligrams per liter (0.00037 oz/cu ft).

The iron load of West Branch Rausch Creek requires a 94 percent reduction to meet the total maximum daily load requirements for the creek. However, the manganese and aluminum loads only require 55 percent and 28 percent reductions, respectively.

The total sediment load in West Branch Rausch Creek is 9,300,750.0 pounds (4,218,749.2 kg) per year, considerably less than in East Branch Rausch Creek. The largest contributor of sediment to West Branch Rausch Creek is disturbed land, which accounts for 7,104,785.3 pounds (3,222,676.4 kg) per year, while the second-largest contributor is deciduous forest, accounting for 1,694,107.5 pounds (768,434.2 kg). Annually, cropland accounts for 343,104.8 pounds (155,629.7 kg), unpaved roads contribute 151,860.1 pounds (68,882.6 kg) of sediment, mixed forest contributes 6,480.6 pounds (2,939.6 kg), and coniferous forest contributes 411.7 pounds (186.7 kg). Hay and pastures contribute no sediment to the creek.

== Geography and geology ==
The elevation near the mouth of West Branch Rausch Creek is 879 feet (268 m) above sea level. The elevation near the creek's source is 1,194 feet (364 m) above sea level.

West Branch Rausch Creek drains an area of land between Bear Mountain and Big Lick Mountain. A mine pool known as the Williamstown-Lykens pool is located in the western portion of the creek's watershed. However, it does not discharge in the watershed, but instead discharges into the watershed of Wiconisco Creek via the Big Lick Tunnel. Another mine pool, the Brookside Mine pool, is located in the watershed of West Branch Rausch Creek and actually does discharge into the creek at 915 feet (279 m) above sea level, via the Valley View Tunnel. The discharge of this pool ranges from 700,000 to 5,200,000 US gallons (2,600 to 19,700 m^{3}) per day, with an average of 2,840,000 US gallons (10,800 m^{3}) per day, making it the largest single source of water and abandoned mine drainage in the watershed.

Some small deep mines and strip mines line the mountain slopes to the north and south of West Branch Rausch Creek. The significant majority of these have not been reclaimed.

== Watershed and biology ==
The watershed of West Branch Rausch Creek has an area of 4.78 square miles (12.4 km^{2}). The creek is entirely within the United States Geological Survey quadrangle of Tower City. Its mouth is located near Tower City.

The dominant land use in the watershed of West Branch Rausch Creek is deciduous forest, which accounts for 2,658.8 acres (1,076.0 ha) of the watershed's 2,960.3 acres (1,198.0 ha). The second-largest and third-largest land uses are disturbed land and mixed forest, which account for 126.0 and 116.1 acres (51.0 and 47.0 ha), respectively. Cropland occupies 29.7 acres (12.0 ha) of the watershed, while coniferous forest occupies 17.3 acres (7.0 ha). Unpaved roads occupy 7.4 acres (3.0 ha), while hay/pastures occupy 4.9 acres (2.0 ha).

West Branch Rausch Creek flows through a swamp in its upper reaches. This swamp is situated in Pennsylvania State Game Lands.

The designated use for West Branch Rausch Creek is aquatic life. The creek is classified as a Coldwater Fishery.

== History ==
West Branch Rausch Creek was entered into the Geographic Names Information System on August 2, 1979. Its identifier in the Geographic Names Information System is 1190927.

A concrete slab bridge carrying Bear Valley Road was constructed across West Branch Rausch Creek in 1973 and is 25.9 feet (7.9 m) long.

In 1996, two companies—Wenrich Coal Co. and D. and F. Deep Mine Coal Co.—applied for renewal of permits for existing anthracite deep mine operations for which the receiving waterbody was West Branch Rausch Creek. One company has a deep mining permit allowing it to discharge into the creek, as of 2001. However, this discharge is only intermittent.

In 2015, Pennsylvania State Game Lands 264 received an additional tract of 86 acres (35 ha) near the headwaters of West Branch Rausch Creek from PPL Corporation.

== See also ==
- East Branch Rausch Creek, the other named tributary of Rausch Creek
- List of rivers of Pennsylvania
