= East Branch Rausch Creek =

Physical characteristics
- Source
  - location: abandoned strip mine in a valley in Porter Township, Schuylkill County, Pennsylvania
  - elevation: 1,303 ft (397 m)
- Mouth
  - location: Rausch Creek in Hegins Township, Schuylkill County, Pennsylvania
  - coordinates: 40°37′05″N 76°33′00″W
  - elevation: 869 ft (265 m)
- Length: 2.3 mi (3.7 km)
- Basin size: 4.21 mi^{2} (10.9 km^{2})
- Discharge
  - average: 1,500,000 US gallons per day (5,700 m^{3}/d)

Basin features
- Progression: Rausch Creek → Pine Creek → Mahantango Creek → Susquehanna River → Chesapeake Bay
- Tributaries
  - right: one unnamed tributary

East Branch Rausch Creek is a tributary of Rausch Creek in Schuylkill County, Pennsylvania, in the United States. It is approximately 2.3 miles (3.7 km) long and flows through Porter Township and Hegins Township. The watershed of the creek has an area of 4.21 square miles (10.9 km^{2}). The creek is impacted by metals, pH, and siltation due to abandoned mine drainage and resource extraction. It drains an area between two mountains: Good Springs Mountain and Big Lick Mountain. There are also two mine pools in the watershed.

The main land use in the watershed of East Branch Rausch Creek is deciduous forest. However, disturbed land is the second-largest land use and accounts for the significant majority of the sediment loading in the creek. As of 2001, there are seven active mining permits in its watershed.

== Course ==
East Branch Rausch Creek begins in a valley on a mountain in Porter Township. It flows north for a few tenths of a mile before turning west—receiving an unnamed tributary from the right—and then northwest, soon crossing a road and entering Hegins Township. Here, the creek begins flowing in a roughly westerly or west-northwesterly direction through a larger valley for several tenths of a mile before heading in a southwesterly direction. After a short distance, it crosses a road and turns west for a short distance before turning west-northwest. Several tenths of a mile further downstream, the creek joins West Branch Rausch Creek to form Rausch Creek.

== Hydrology ==
Reaches of East Branch Rausch Creek are designated as impaired waterbodies. The causes of impairment in these reaches include siltation, metals, and pH, while the sources include abandoned mine drainage and resource extraction.

The average discharge of East Branch Rausch Creek near its mouth was measured to be 1,500,000 US gallons (5,700 m^{3}) per day. The pH of the creek near its mouth ranged from 4.5 to 6.8, with an average of 5.75. The concentration of alkalinity ranged from 0 to 30 milligrams per liter (0.000 to 0.030 oz/cu ft), with an average of 8.81 milligrams per liter (0.00880 oz/cu ft).

The iron concentration in East Branch Rausch Creek near its mouth was found to range from 0.33 to 19.90 milligrams per liter (0.00033 to 0.01988 oz/cu ft), with an average of 4.40 milligrams per liter (0.00439 oz/cu ft). The manganese concentration ranged from 1.84 to 4.28 milligrams per liter (0.00184 to 0.00428 oz/cu ft). The concentration of aluminum ranged between 0.23 and 11.10 milligrams per liter (0.00023 and 0.01109 oz/cu ft), and averaged 3.15 milligrams per liter (0.00315 oz/cu ft). The aluminum load requires a 95 percent reduction to meet the creek's total maximum daily load requirements, while the iron load requires a 94 percent reduction and the manganese load requires a 78 percent reduction. The acidity load requires an 84 percent reduction to meet its total maximum daily load requirements.

The annual load of sediment in East Branch Rausch Creek is 17,628,454.6 pounds (7,996,132.5 kg). By far the largest contributor is disturbed land, which accounts for 16,795,923.8 pounds (7,618,502.9 kg) per year. Other contributors include deciduous forest (486,781.7 pounds (220,800.5 kg) per year), cropland (333,228.2 pounds (151,149.8 kg) per year), high-intensity urban land (9,571.8 pounds (4,341.7 kg) per year), mixed forest (2,342.3 pounds (1,062.4 kg) annually), coniferous forest (493.4 pounds (223.8 kg) per year), and hay/pastures (113.4 pounds (51.4 kg) per year).

== Geography and geology ==
The elevation near the mouth of East Branch Rausch Creek is 869 feet (265 m) above sea level. The elevation near the creek's source is 1,303 feet (397 m) above sea level.

The watershed of East Branch Rausch Creek is situated between Good Springs Mountain and Big Lick Mountain. The headwaters of the creek are in a large abandoned strip mine.

There are two mine pools in the watershed of East Branch Rausch Creek: the Good Spring No. 1 Pool and the Good Spring No. 3 Pool. The former discharges into the creek via the Orchard Airway at an elevation of 1,104 feet (336 m) above sea level and has discharges ranging from 180,000 to 2,700,000 US gallons (680 to 10,220 m^{3}) per day, with an average of 320,000 US gallons (1,200 m^{3}) per day. The latter mine pool does not discharge into the watershed of East Branch Rausch Creek, but instead discharges via the Tracy Airway into the watershed of Good Spring Creek, a tributary of Swatara Creek.

== Watershed and biology ==
The watershed of East Branch Rausch Creek has an area of 4.21 square miles (10.9 km^{2}). East Branch Rausch Creek is entirely within the United States Geological Survey quadrangle of Tower City. There are approximately 2.52 miles (4.06 km) of streams in the watershed. The headwaters of the creek are about two miles (three kilometers) from the village of Good Spring, via State Route 4011.

The dominant land use in the watershed of East Branch Rausch Creek is forested land. Of the 2,458.6 acres (995.0 ha) of land in the creek's watershed, 1,949.6 acres (789.0 ha) is occupied by deciduous forest. Disturbed land is the second-largest land use, accounting for 306.4 acres (124.0 ha). Cropland occupies 93.9 acres (38.0 ha), mixed forest occupies 64.2 acres (26.0 ha), and deciduous forest occupies 24.7 acres (10.0 ha). A total of 17.3 acres (7.0 ha) in the watershed is high-intensity urban development, and 2.5 acres (1.0 ha) are hay/pastures.

The drainage basin of East Branch Rausch Creek is designated as a Coldwater Fishery.

== History ==
East Branch Rausch Creek was entered into the Geographic Names Information System on August 2, 1979. Its identifier in the Geographic Names Information System is 1173763.

As of 2001, there are seven permitted mining operations in the watershed of East Branch Rausch Creek. Only two of them have an NPDES permit, and only one of those two has an active discharge.

== See also ==
- West Branch Rausch Creek, the other named tributary of Rausch Creek
- List of rivers of Pennsylvania
