= Deep Creek (Mahantango Creek tributary) =

Physical characteristics
- Source
  - location: pond in Lykens Township, Duaphin County, Pennsylvania
  - elevation: 741 ft (226 m)
- Mouth
  - location: Mahantango Creek in Pillow, Duaphin County, Pennsylvania
  - coordinates: 40°38′27″N 76°47′41″W
  - elevation: 482 ft (147 m)
- Length: 5.9 mi (9.5 km)
- Basin size: 10.6 mi^{2} (27 km^{2})

Basin features
- Progression: Mahantango Creek → Susquehanna River → Chesapeake Bay
- Tributaries
  - left: five unnamed tributaries, one unnamed distributary
  - right: four unnamed tributaries

Deep Creek is a tributary of Mahantango Creek in Dauphin County, Pennsylvania, in the United States. It is approximately 5.9 miles (9.5 km) long and flows through Lykens Township and Pillow. The watershed of the creek has an area of 10.6 square miles (27 km^{2}). It is not designated as an impaired waterbody, but is nevertheless observed to have high nitrate concentrations. Major land uses in the creek's watershed include agricultural land and forested land. The creek's watershed is classified as a Warmwater Fishery.

== Course ==
Deep Creek begins in a pond in Lykens Township. It flows north for several tenths of a mile, passing through three more ponds, before turning west-northwest. After several tenths of a mile, the creek turns west-southwest for several tenths of a mile before receiving an unnamed tributary from the right and heading in a westerly direction for several tenths of a mile. In this reach, it receives one unnamed tributary from the right and one from the left. It then meanders west-northwest for several tenths of a mile before turning west-southwest for more than a mile. In this reach, the creek receives one unnamed tributary from the right and one from the left. It eventually makes several meanders in a northwesterly direction, receiving three unnamed tributaries from the left and one from the right. The creek then flows north-northwest through a water gap in Mahantango Mountain for a few tenths of a mile, entering Pillow. Here, an unnamed distributary of the creek splits off from the left bank to the north and the creek itself turns north-northeast. A few tenths of a mile further downstream, it reaches its confluence with Mahantango Creek.

Deep Creek joins Mahantango Creek 10.30 miles (16.58 km) upstream of its mouth.

== Hydrology ==
Deep Creek is not designated as an impaired waterbody as of 2004. However, the Dauphin County conservation District has observed that nitrate concentrations in the creek are among the highest in Dauphin County. It is also likely that sediment loads are relatively high.

== Geography and geology ==
The elevation near the mouth of Deep Creek is 482 feet (147 m) above sea level. The elevation near the creek's source is 741 feet (226 m) above sea level.

Deep Creek cuts through Mahantango Mountain on its course. This makes the creek's watershed one of the few areas where the watershed of Mahantango Creek extend south of Mahantango Mountain.

== Watershed and biology ==
The watershed of Deep Creek has an area of 10.6 square miles (27 km^{2}). The mouth of the creek is in the United States Geological Survey quadrangle of Pillow. However, its source is in the quadrangle of Lykens. The creek also passes through the quadrangle of Klingerstown. Its mouth is located at Pillow.

The main land use in the upper reaches of the watershed of Deep Creek is agricultural land. However, there are blocks of various other land uses in this area as well. In the lower reaches, forested land dominates, except for an area in the vicinity of the creek's mouth.

Deep Creek is one of the main tributaries of Mahantango Creek in Dauphin County, along with Pine Creek.

== History ==
Deep Creek was entered into the Geographic Names Information System on August 2, 1979. Its identifier in the Geographic Names Information System is 1173058.

A cotton mill and a saw mill historically existed on Deep Creek.

A concrete frame bridge carrying State Route 1009/N. Cross Road over Deep Creek was constructed 1 mile (1.6 km) south of Pillow in 1985 and is 24.0 feet (7.3 m) long. In 2013, it was proposed that the $610,432 Growing Greener County Environmental Initiative Program be redesignated to several projects, including the protection and repair of stream banks along the creek. In 2015, a permit was issued to discharge stormwater into Deep Creek during construction operations.

== Biology ==
The drainage basin of Deep Creek is classified as a Warmwater Fishery. Macroinvertebrate samples from the creek encountered eleven types per sample, but only four that were pollution-sensitive.

Deep Creek generally lacks adequate riparian buffers, although the main stem of Mahantango Creek has greater buffering. In 2008, a site on the creek near Luxembourg Road was classified as being in "poor" health. Hilsenhoff Biotic Index values indicated that organic pollution in the watershed was likely.

== See also ==
- Snow Creek (Mahantango Creek), next tributary of Mahantango Creek going upstream
- List of rivers of Pennsylvania
