= Eldred Township, Schuylkill County, Pennsylvania =

Township in Pennsylvania, US

Coordinates: 40°45′01″N 76°24′59″W

- Township
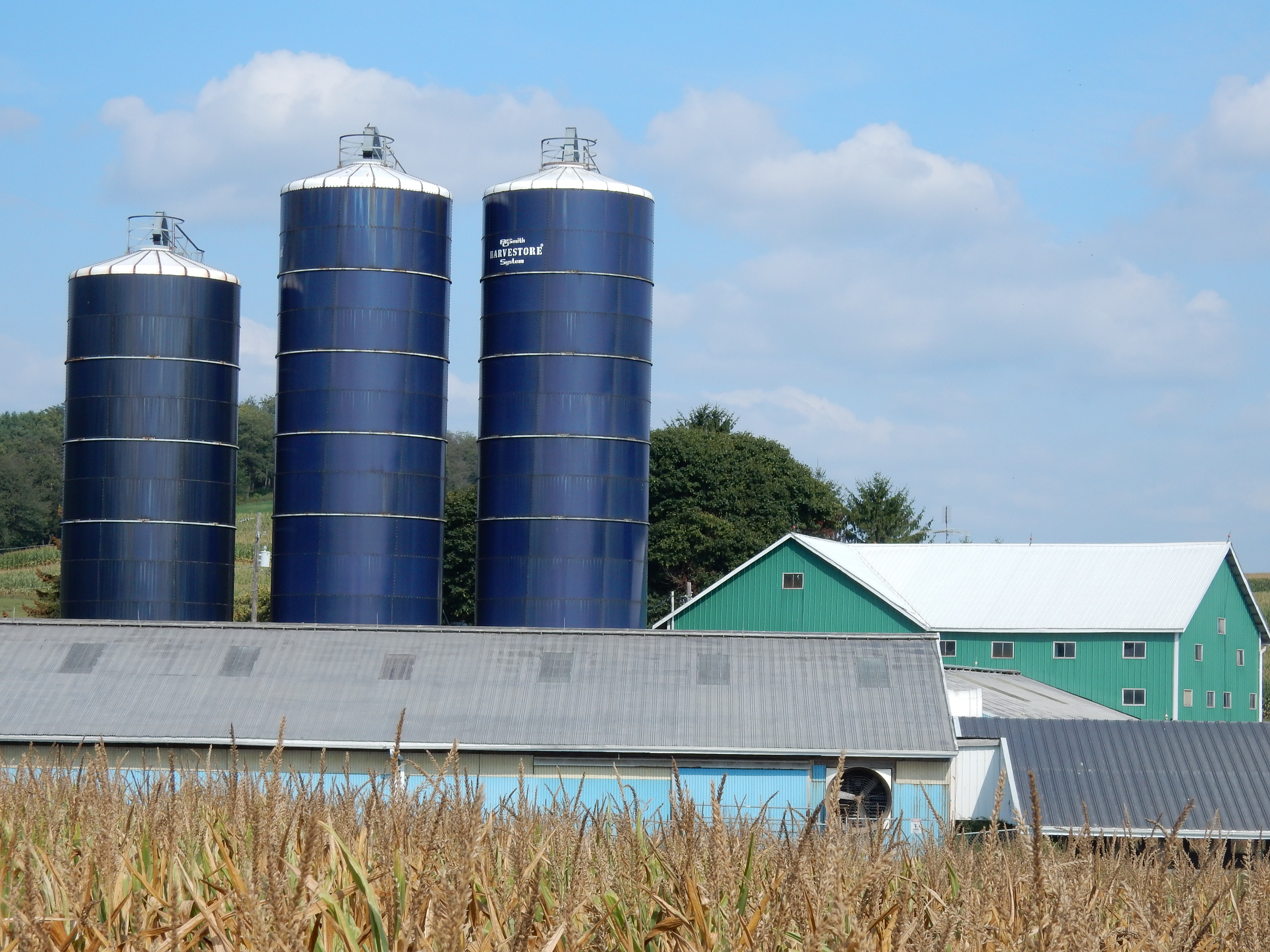
- Farm on Zion Church Rd., Eldred Township.

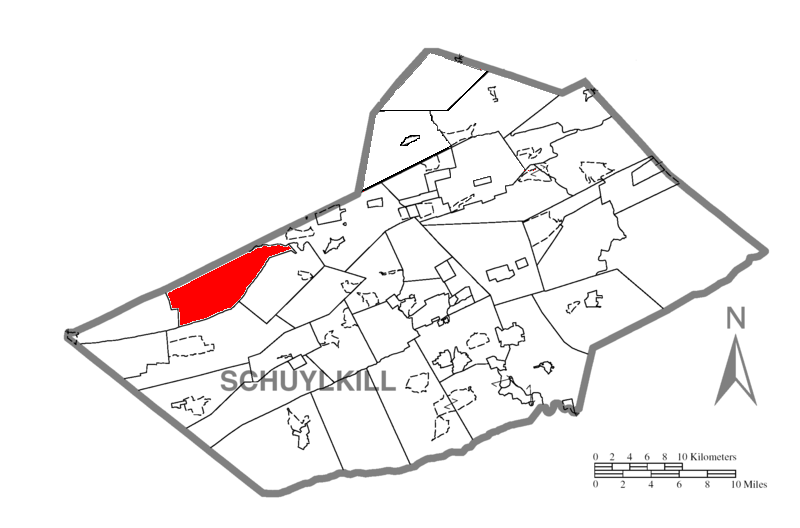
- Map of Schuylkill County, Pennsylvania Highlighting Eldred Township

- Map of Schuylkill County, Pennsylvania
- Country: United States
- State: Pennsylvania
- County: Schuylkill
- Settled: 1805
- Incorporated: 1849

Area
  - Total: 22.25 sq mi (57.63 km^{2})
  - Land: 22.25 sq mi (57.63 km^{2})
  - Water: 0 sq mi (0.00 km^{2})

Population (2020)
  - Total: 710 ▼
  - Estimate (2023): 714
  - Density: 33.1/sq mi (12.79/km^{2})
- Time zone: UTC-5 (Eastern (EST))
  - Summer (DST): UTC-4 (EDT)
- FIPS code: 42-107-22912

Eldred Township is a township in Schuylkill County, Pennsylvania, United States. Settled in 1805 and incorporated in 1849 from part of Upper Mahantongo Township, it is named for Judge Nathaniel Eldred. The population was 710 at the 2020 census.

== Geography ==
According to the United States Census Bureau, the township has a total area of 22.2 square miles (57 km^{2}), all land. Part of the Weiser State Forest is located in the township.

== Demographics ==
Historical population
| Census | Pop. | Note | %± |
|---|---|---|---|
| 2010 | 758 | | — |
| 2020 | 710 | | −6.3% |
| 2023 (est.) | 714 | | 0.6% |
U.S. Decennial Census

As of the census of 2000, there were 719 people, 271 households, and 208 families residing in the township. The population density was 32.4 inhabitants per square mile (12.5/km^{2}). There were 289 housing units at an average density of 13.0/sq mi (5.0/km^{2}). The racial makeup of the township was 99.30% White, 0.14% African American and 0.56% Asian. Hispanic or Latino of any race were 0.42% of the population.

There were 271 households, out of which 29.2% had children under the age of 18 living with them, 67.5% were married couples living together, 5.2% had a female householder with no husband present, and 23.2% were non-families. 21.0% of all households were made up of individuals, and 10.3% had someone living alone who was 65 years of age or older. The average household size was 2.65 and the average family size was 3.09.

In the township the population was spread out, with 20.7% under the age of 18, 8.9% from 18 to 24, 27.3% from 25 to 44, 24.8% from 45 to 64, and 18.4% who were 65 years of age or older. The median age was 41 years. For every 100 females, there were 109.6 males. For every 100 females age 18 and over, there were 111.9 males.

The median income for a household in the township was $34,667, and the median income for a family was $37,083. Males had a median income of $27,632 versus $20,962 for females. The per capita income for the township was $16,743. About 5.7% of families and 6.2% of the population were below the poverty line, including 5.5% of those under age 18 and 11.3% of those age 65 or over.

== Gallery ==
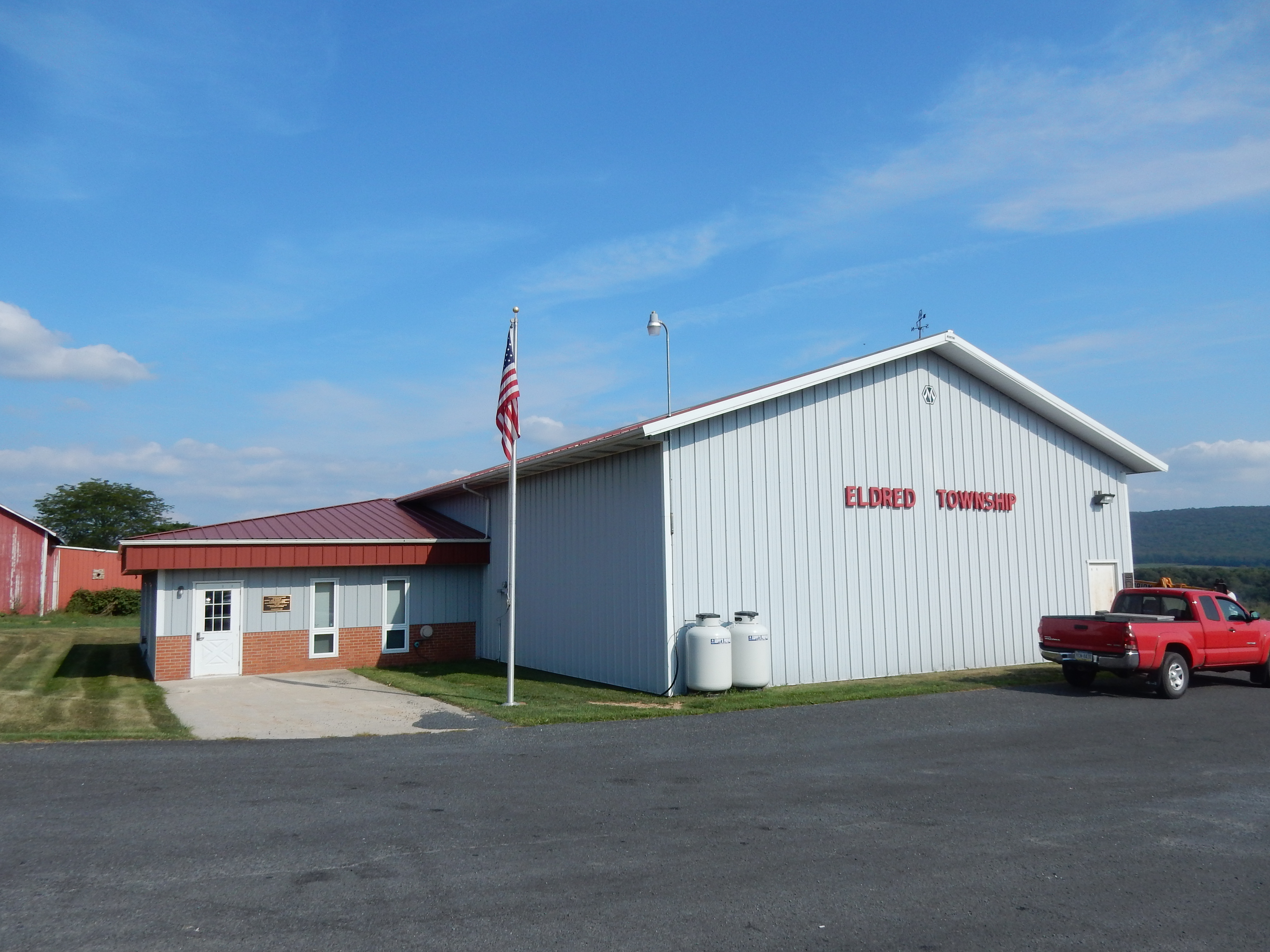
Eldred Township Office.

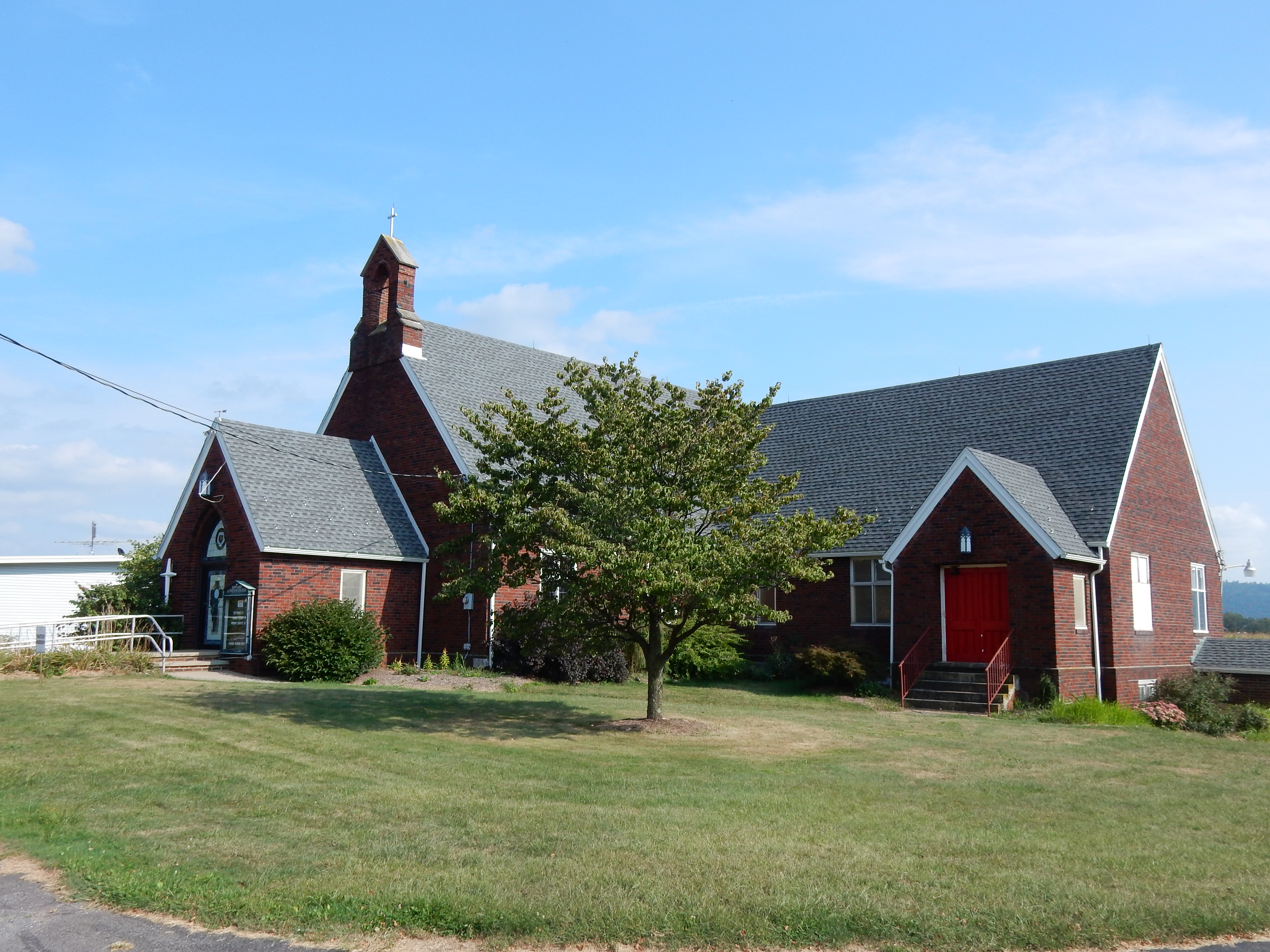
St. James Lutheran Church in Pitman.

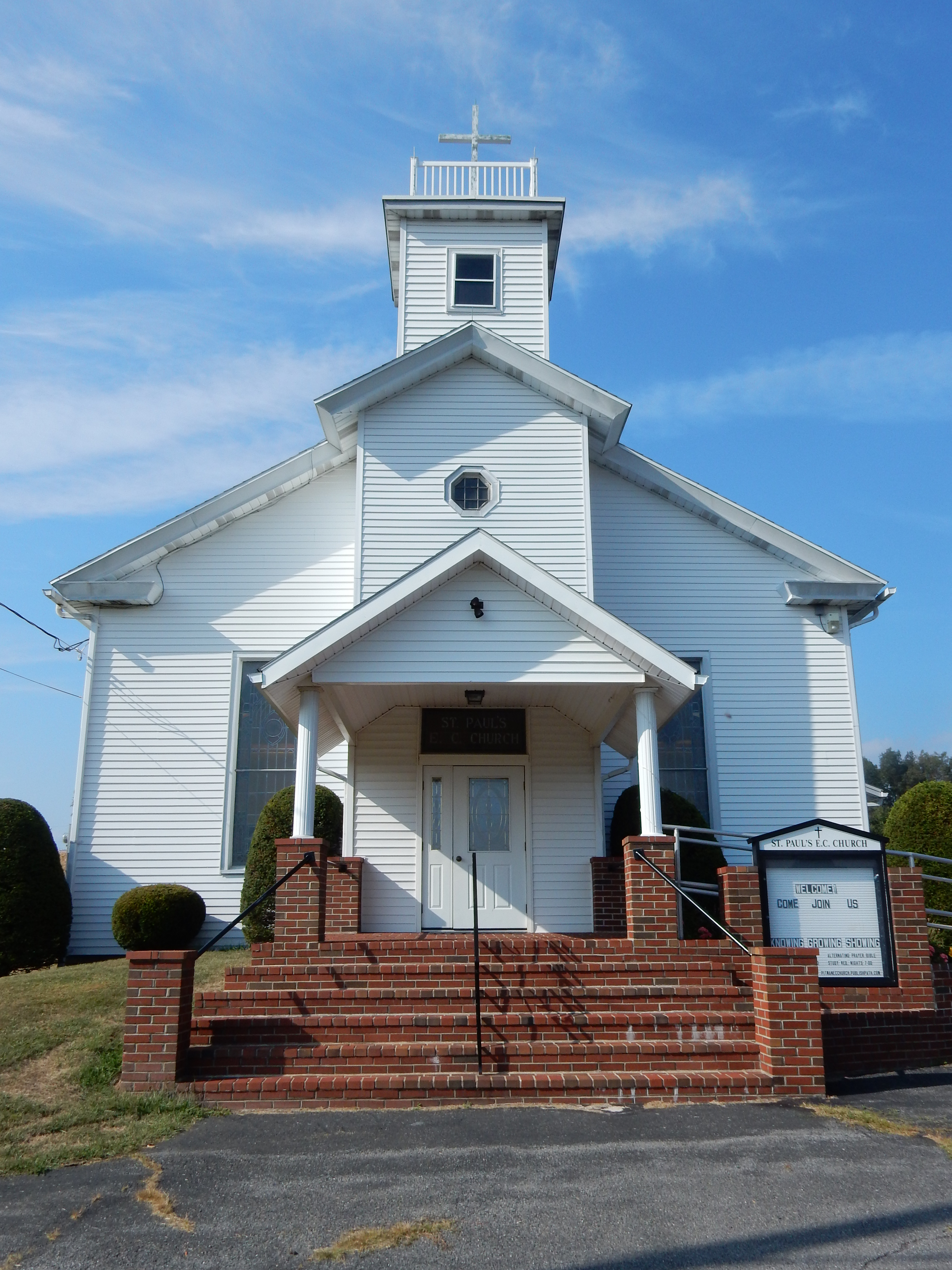
St. Paul's Church.

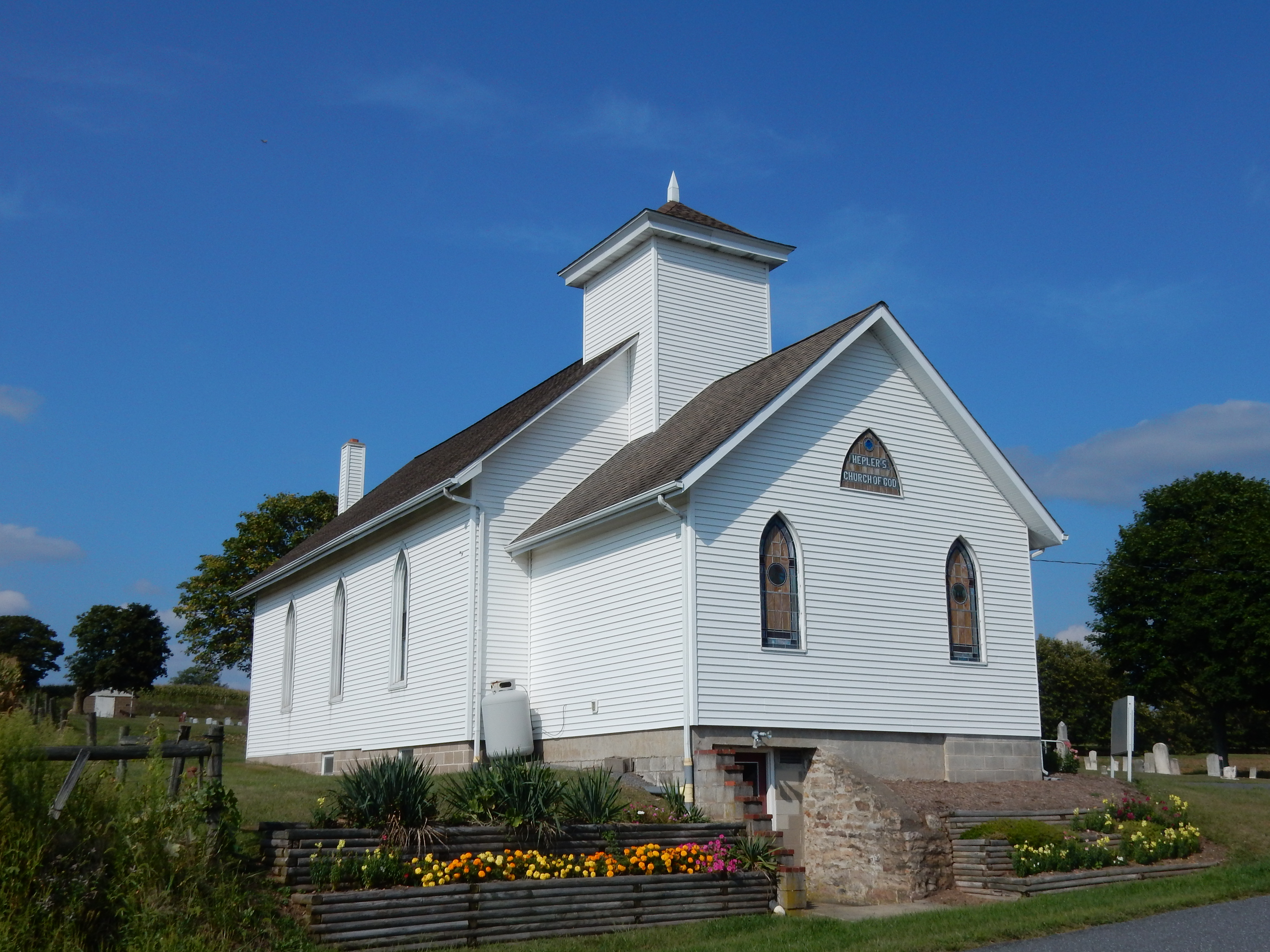
Hepler's Church of God.
