= Beurys Lake, Pennsylvania =

Unincorporated community in Pennsylvania, US

Beurys Lake Moon Lake
- Census-designated place
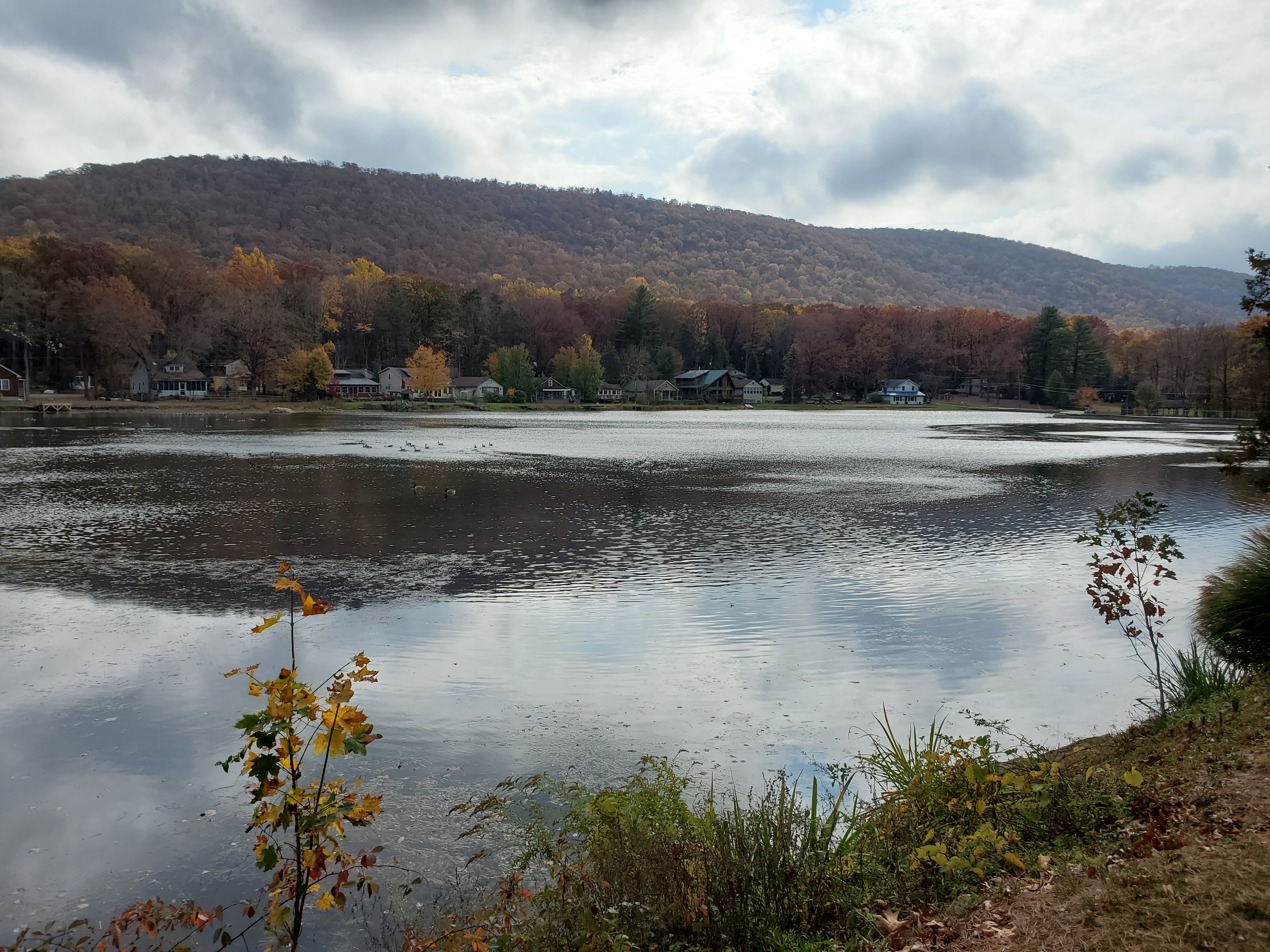

- Location within the U.S. state of Pennsylvania Beurys Lake (the United States)
- Coordinates: 40°43′5″N 76°22′46″W
- Country: United States
- State: Pennsylvania
- County: Schuylkill

Area
  - Total: 0.41 sq mi (1.05 km^{2})
  - Land: 0.39 sq mi (1.01 km^{2})
  - Water: 0.015 sq mi (0.04 km^{2})

Population (2020)
  - Total: 132
  - Density: 338.0/sq mi (130.52/km^{2})
- Time zone: UTC-5 (Eastern (EST))
  - Summer (DST): UTC-4 (EDT)
- FIPS code: 42-06171

Beurys Lake (/ˈbɛriz/) is a census-designated place in Barry Township, Pennsylvania, United States. The population was 132 at the 2020 census.

For the Moon Lake located in Luzerne County, Pennsylvania, see Moon Lake Park.

While Beurys Lake is the official name of the census-dedicated place encompassing the lake and homes in the general lake area, the lake has been known as Moon Lake since 1984 when it was acquired by the residents of the lake community. The lake is privately owned by Moon Lake Association, Inc. and there is no public access.

== Geography ==
Beurys Lake is located at 40°43′5″N 76°22′46″W (40.717942, -76.379373).

According to the United States Census Bureau, the CDP has a total area of 0.4 square miles (1.0 km^{2}), of which 0.4 square miles (1.0 km^{2}) is land and 2.50% is water.

== Demographics ==
Historical population
Census	Pop.	Note	%±
2020	132		—
U.S. Decennial Census

At the 2000 census there were 133 people, 58 households, and 38 families living in the CDP. The population density was 342.7 inhabitants per square mile (132.3/km^{2}). There were 128 housing units at an average density of 329.8 per square mile (127.3/km^{2}). The racial makeup of the CDP was 100.00% White. Of the 58 households 29.3% had children under the age of 18 living with them, 62.1% were married couples living together, 3.4% had a female householder with no husband present, and 32.8% were non-families. 27.6% of households were one person and 6.9% were one person aged 65 or older. The average household size was 2.29 and the average family size was 2.82.

The age distribution was 20.3% under the age of 18, 6.0% from 18 to 24, 30.1% from 25 to 44, 30.8% from 45 to 64, and 12.8% 65 or older. The median age was 42 years. For every 100 females, there were 98.5 males. For every 100 females age 18 and over, there were 112.0 males.

The median household income was $45,000 and the median family income was $55,833. Males had a median income of $38,750 versus $18,750 for females. The per capita income for the CDP was $24,247. There were 8.8% of families and 7.3% of the population living below the poverty line, including 11.1% of under eighteens and none of those over 64.

== History ==
=== Beury's Grove ===
Harvey E Beury (1871–1965) and his wife Alice Hubler Beury (1871–1952) began creating the Beury's Lake in 1920 by creating a dam on Deep Creek (then also known as Buckhorn Creek) and removing the trees and stumps from the surrounding area. "Beury's Grove" opened in 1923 as a swimming attraction at "Beury's Lake" with a 10 cent admission fee. Later additions included cottages for rent or sale, boating, canoeing, fishing, and camping. Facilities included a picnic area, dance hall, and band shell. Entertainment included local bands and as well as celebrities such as the Lone Ranger.

=== Mountain Valley Lake ===
Beury's Grove, Inc began seeking a buyer for the grove in 1957 which culminated in the sale to a group of private investors called Mountain Valley Lake, Inc in 1962. Despite the corporation changing the attraction's name to "Mountain Valley Lake," most references included the parenthetical "Formerly Beury's Grove" since that name remained in common use. Competition from other area attractions (for example, Knoebel's Grove which started as a similar summer swimming site and continued to expand into an amusement park with thrill rides) and changing social interests led to decreasing attendance and financial difficulties for Mountain Valley Lake. The corporation faced a sheriff's sale in 1970. The lake closed for the 1971 season and permanently in 1974. The corporation then tried to sell the location which contained the lake and a few surrounding lands and buildings from 1974 through 1983.

=== Moon Lake Association ===
In 1984 the lake property was purchased by Moon Lake Association, Inc. The lake proper was also renamed "Moon Lake" at this time and is shown as such in the Census-designated place map of Barry Township This was a homeowner's association created by a group of homeowners surrounding the lake who were interested in preserving the lake. This voluntary association continues to represent the interests of those living in the area around the lake.

== Education ==
The school district is Tri-Valley School District.
