= Deep Creek (Pine Creek tributary) =

Coordinates: 40°38′14″N 76°37′00″W

Deep Creek is a tributary of Pine Creek in Schuylkill County, Pennsylvania, in the United States. It is approximately 22.9 miles (36.9 km) long and flows through Barry Township, Hegins Township, and Hubley Township. Its watershed has an area of 31.80 square miles (82.4 km^{2}). Major tributaries of the creek include Hans Yost Creek.

== Course ==
Deep Creek begins in Beury's Lake, a lake in Barry Township. For several miles, the creek flows southwest in a valley between two mountains. Along the way, it receives the tributary Hans Yost Creek. A short distance downstream of that, it exits Barry Township. Upon leaving Barry Township, the creek enters Hegins Township. Here, it flows through a valley between Little Mountain and Mahantango Mountain. Once the creek passes the end of Little Mountain, it enters a valley between Good Spring Mountain and Mahantango Mountain. It shares this valley with Pine Creek. Deep Creek meanders west for several miles, eventually leaving Hegins Township. Upon leaving Hegins Township, the creek enters Hubley Township. It continues meandering west for a few miles until it reaches its confluence with Pine Creek in the central part of the township.

Deep Creek joins Pine Creek 8.14 miles (13.10 km) upstream of its mouth.

== Geography, geology, and climate ==
The elevation near the mouth of Deep Creek is 577 feet (176 m) above sea level. From river mile 18 to river mile 15.5, the creek's elevation decreases at a rate of 8 feet (2.4 m) per mile. From river mile 15.5 to the mouth, its elevation decreases at a rate of 20.6 feet (6.3 m) per mile.

Deep Creek is relatively shallow. It has pools and riffles and its bottom is cobbled.

The topography of the watershed of Deep Creek is described as "rough and hilly" in a 1921 book. The creek's channel is tortuous. Rock formations made of limestone and shale are present along it.

The average level of precipitation in the watershed of Deep Creek ranges from 45 to 50 inches (110 to 130 cm) per year.

== Watershed ==
The watershed of Deep Creek has an area of 31.80 square miles (82.4 km^{2}). The watershed is in western Schuylkill County. It is part of the middle main Susquehanna basin. The creek mostly is in rural areas and is surrounded by forest for large portions of its length. Mountain ranges flank the watershed.

A weir is located on Deep Creek.

== History and recreation ==
In the early 1900s, agriculture was the main industry in the watershed of Deep Creek. In 1921, the major communities in the watershed included Valley View, Hegins, and Sacramento. These communities had populations of 580, 400, and 202, respectively.

At least 9.9 miles (15.9 km) of Deep Creek are usable for canoeing. Edward Gertler describes the scenery along the creek as "good" in his book Keystone Canoeing.

== See also ==
- List of rivers of Pennsylvania
