= Pitman, Pennsylvania =

Unincorporated community in Pennsylvania, US

Pitman
- Unincorporated community
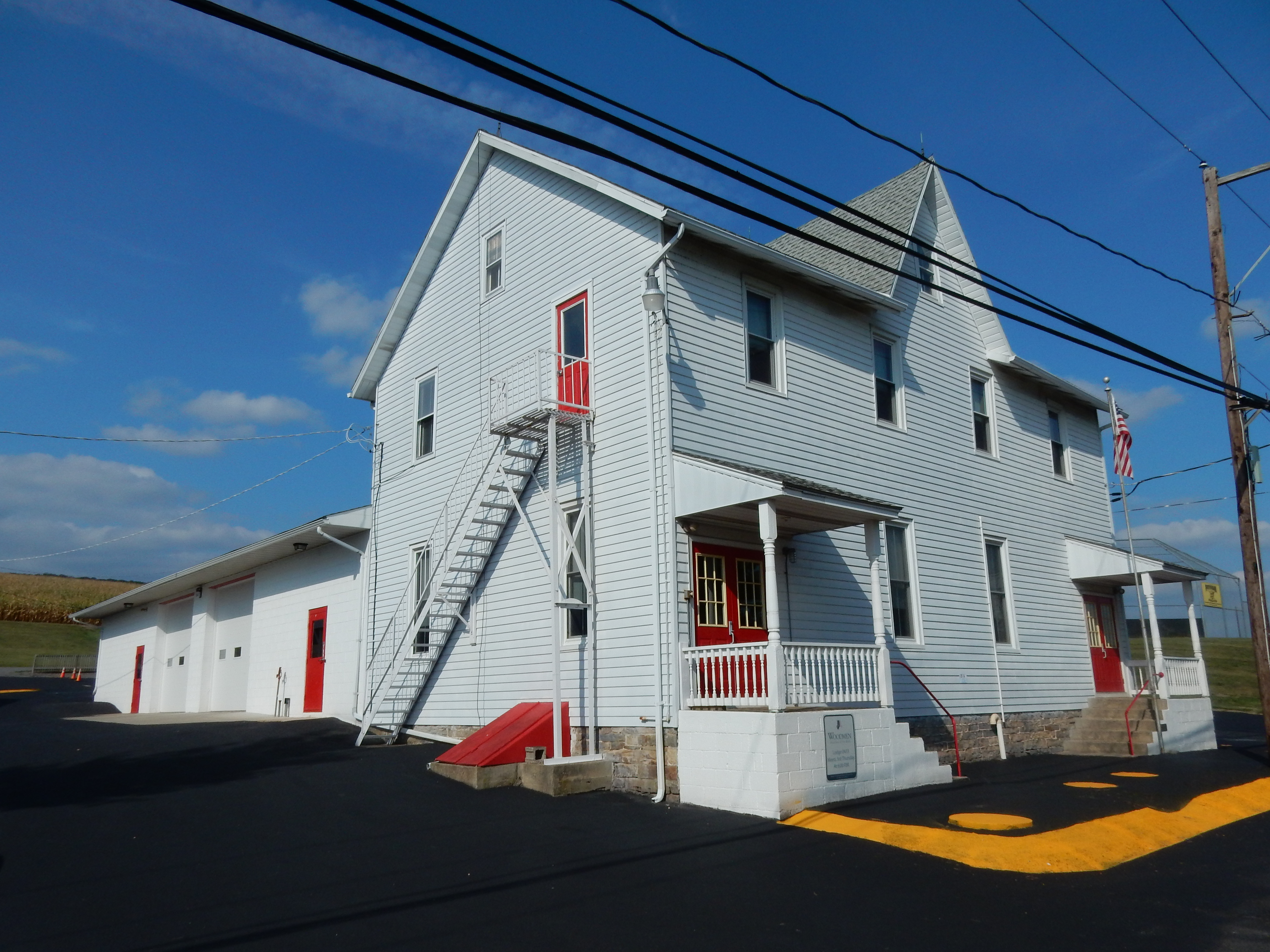
- Mahantongo Fire Co. in Pitman.

- Location within the state of Pennsylvania Pitman (the United States)
- Coordinates: 40°42′54″N 76°31′15″W
- Country: United States
- State: Pennsylvania
- County: Schuylkill
- Elevation: 928 ft (283 m)
- Time zone: UTC-5 (Eastern (EST))
  - Summer (DST): UTC-4 (EDT)
- ZIP codes: 17964
- Area code: 570
- GNIS feature ID: 1183975

Pitman is a small, unincorporated community that is located in Eldred Township, Schuylkill County, Pennsylvania, United States.

The village center lies on state route 4022 and includes approximately twenty-five residences.

== History ==
The earliest settlements in the vicinity of Pitman were established circa 1800. The village was originally known as Zimmermanstown.

== Geography ==
Pitman is located in the far eastern end of the Mahantongo valley where Mahantango Mountain and Line Mountain meet. The Little Mahantango Creek, a tributary within the Susquehanna River basin, begins in the vicinity of Pitman and flows westward into Mahantango Creek.

== Notable features ==
Agriculture is the primary industry.

A U.S. Post Office is located in the village. Because the 17964 postal code extends over nearly all of Eldred Township, area residents refer to the entire township as Pitman.

== Gallery ==
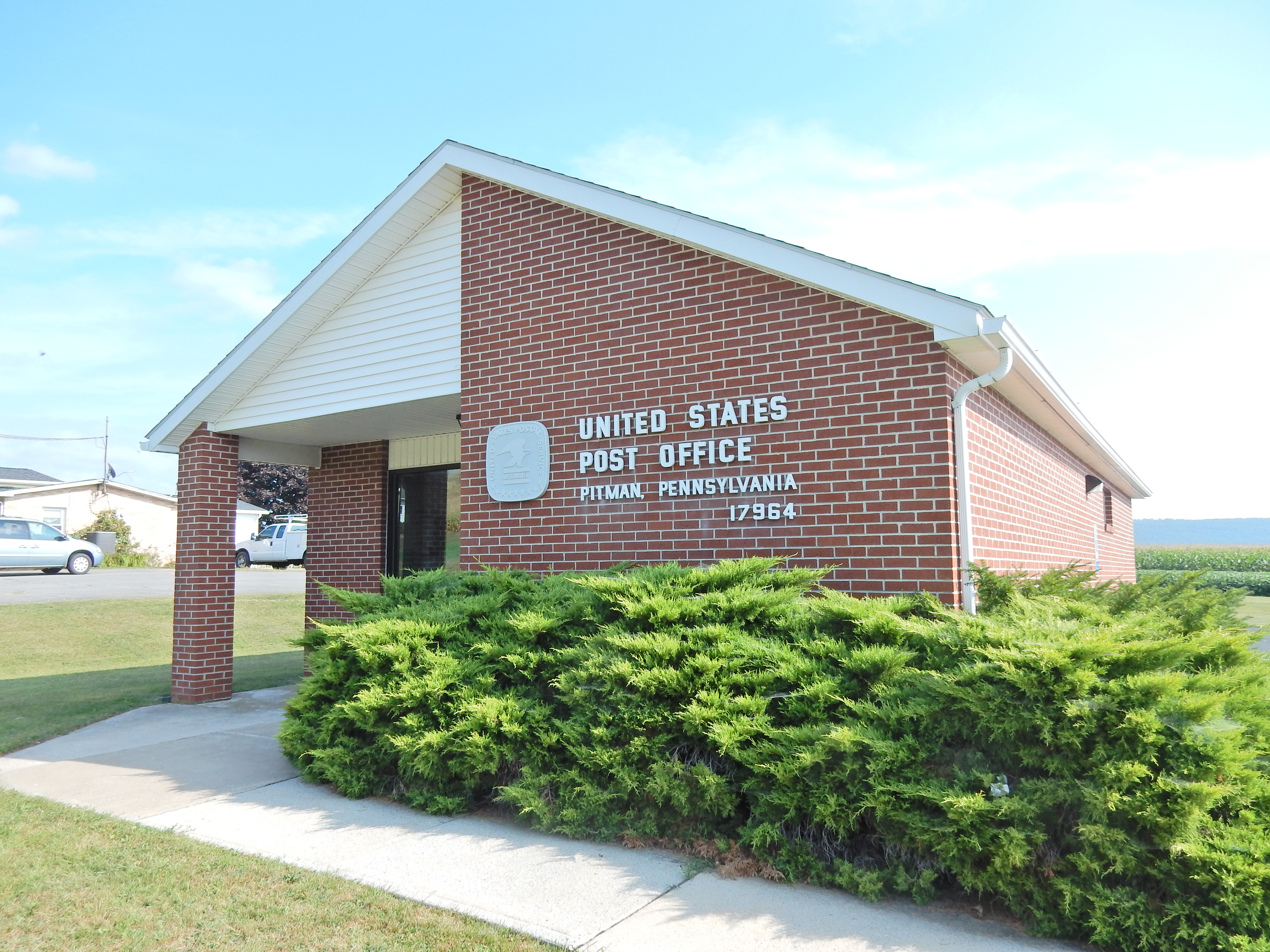
Post Office.

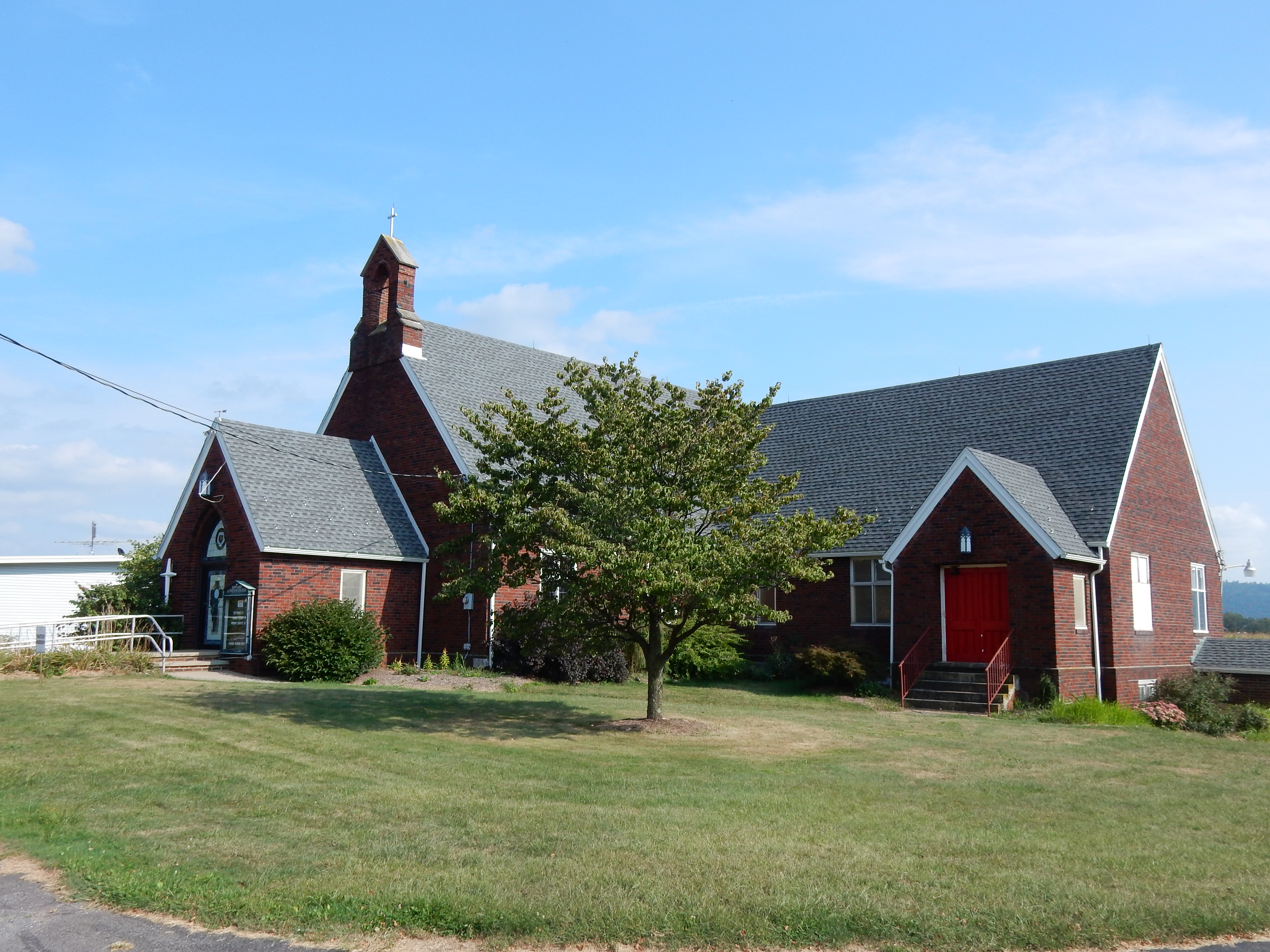
St. James Lutheran Church.
