= Barry Township, Pennsylvania =

Township in Pennsylvania, US

Coordinates: 40°45′06″N 76°23′59″W

- Township
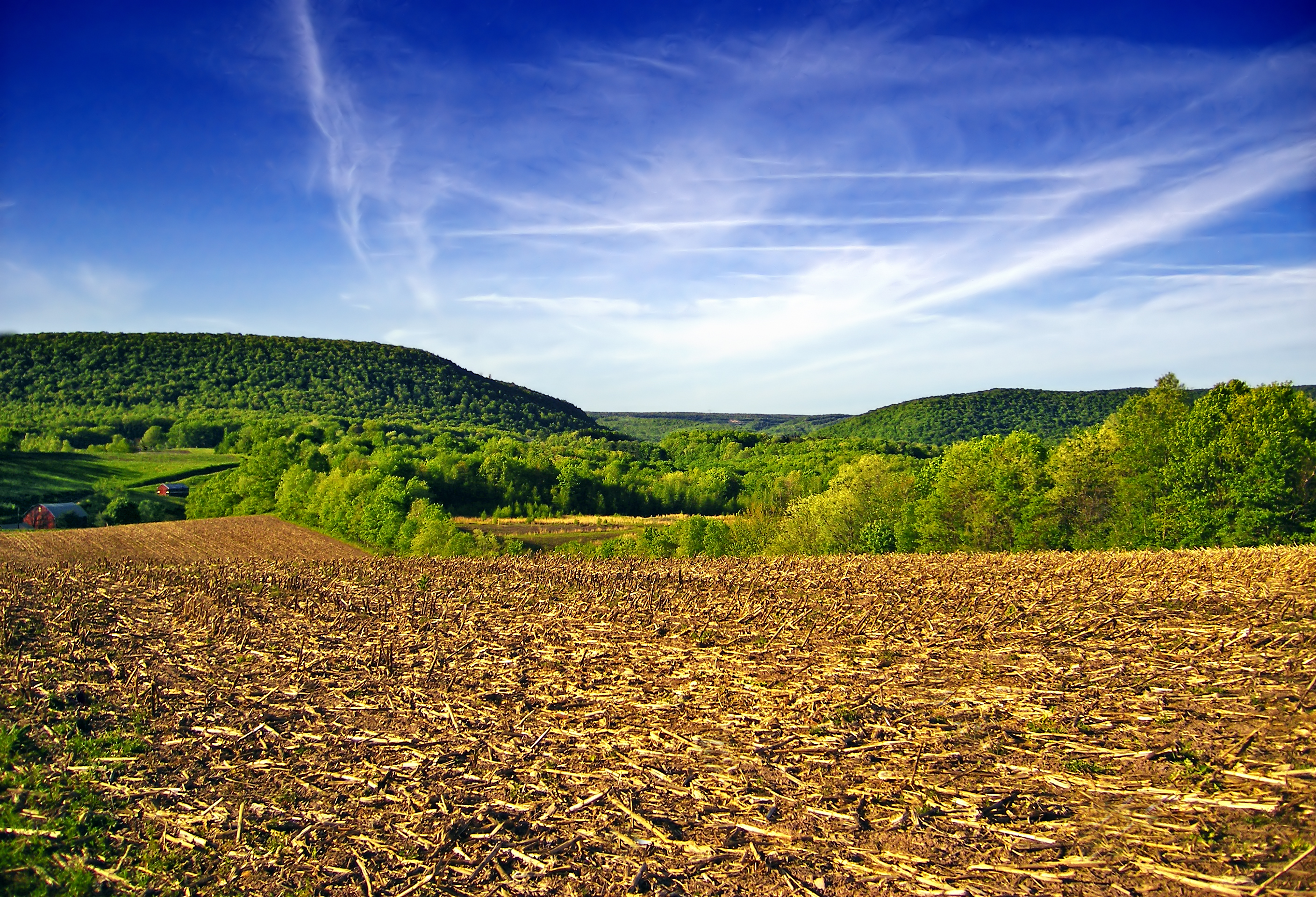
- A farm in Barry Township

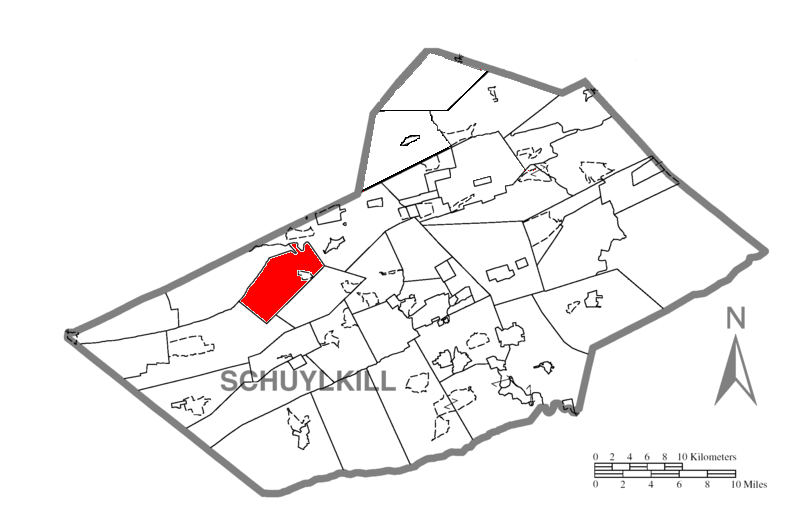
- Map of Schuylkill County, Pennsylvania Highlighting Barry Township

- Map of Schuylkill County, Pennsylvania
- Country: United States
- State: Pennsylvania
- County: Schuylkill
- Settled: 1808
- Incorporated: 1822

Area
  - Total: 16.80 sq mi (43.52 km^{2})
  - Land: 16.78 sq mi (43.46 km^{2})
  - Water: 0.023 sq mi (0.06 km^{2})

Population (2020)
  - Total: 914 ▼
  - Estimate (2023): 918
  - Density: 53.5/sq mi (20.66/km^{2})
- Time zone: UTC-5 (Eastern (EST))
  - Summer (DST): UTC-4 (EDT)
- FIPS code: 42-107-04352

Barry Township is a township in Schuylkill County, Pennsylvania. Formed in 1822, it is named for American Revolutionary War Commander John Barry and was formed from parts of Norwegian and Schuylkill Townships.

== Geography ==
According to the U.S. Census Bureau, the township has a total area of 16.8 square miles (44 km^{2}), of which 16.7 square miles (43 km^{2}) is land and 0.04 square miles (0.10 km^{2}) (0.12%) is water. It contains part of the census-designated place of Beurys Lake.

== Demographics ==
Historical population
Census	Pop.	Note	%±
2010	932		—
2020	914		−1.9%
2023 (est.)	918		0.4%
U.S. Decennial Census

At the 2000 census there were 967 people, 362 households, and 275 families living in the township. The population density was 57.8 inhabitants per square mile (22.3/km^{2}). There were 451 housing units at an average density of 26.9 per square mile (10.4/km^{2}). The racial makeup of the township was 100.00% White. Of the 362 households, 31.5% had children under the age of 18 living with them, 66.3% were married couples living together, 6.1% had a female householder with no husband present, and 24.0% were non-families. 20.4% of households were one person and 10.8% were one person aged 65 or older. The average household size was 2.55 and the average family size was 2.96.

The age distribution was 21.8% under the age of 18, 5.5% from 18 to 24, 30.3% from 25 to 44, 22.6% from 45 to 64, and 19.8% 65 or older. The median age was 41 years. For every 100 females, there were 88.1 males. For every 100 females age 18 and over, there were 84.8 males.

The median household income was $39,861 and the median family income was $45,658. Males had a median income of $37,813 versus $21,964 for females. The per capita income for the township was $17,539. About 4.7% of families and 5.2% of the population were below the poverty line, including 5.1% of those under age 18 and 2.4% of those age 65 or over.
