= Klingerstown, Pennsylvania =

Unincorporated community in Pennsylvania, US

Klingerstown
- Census-designated place
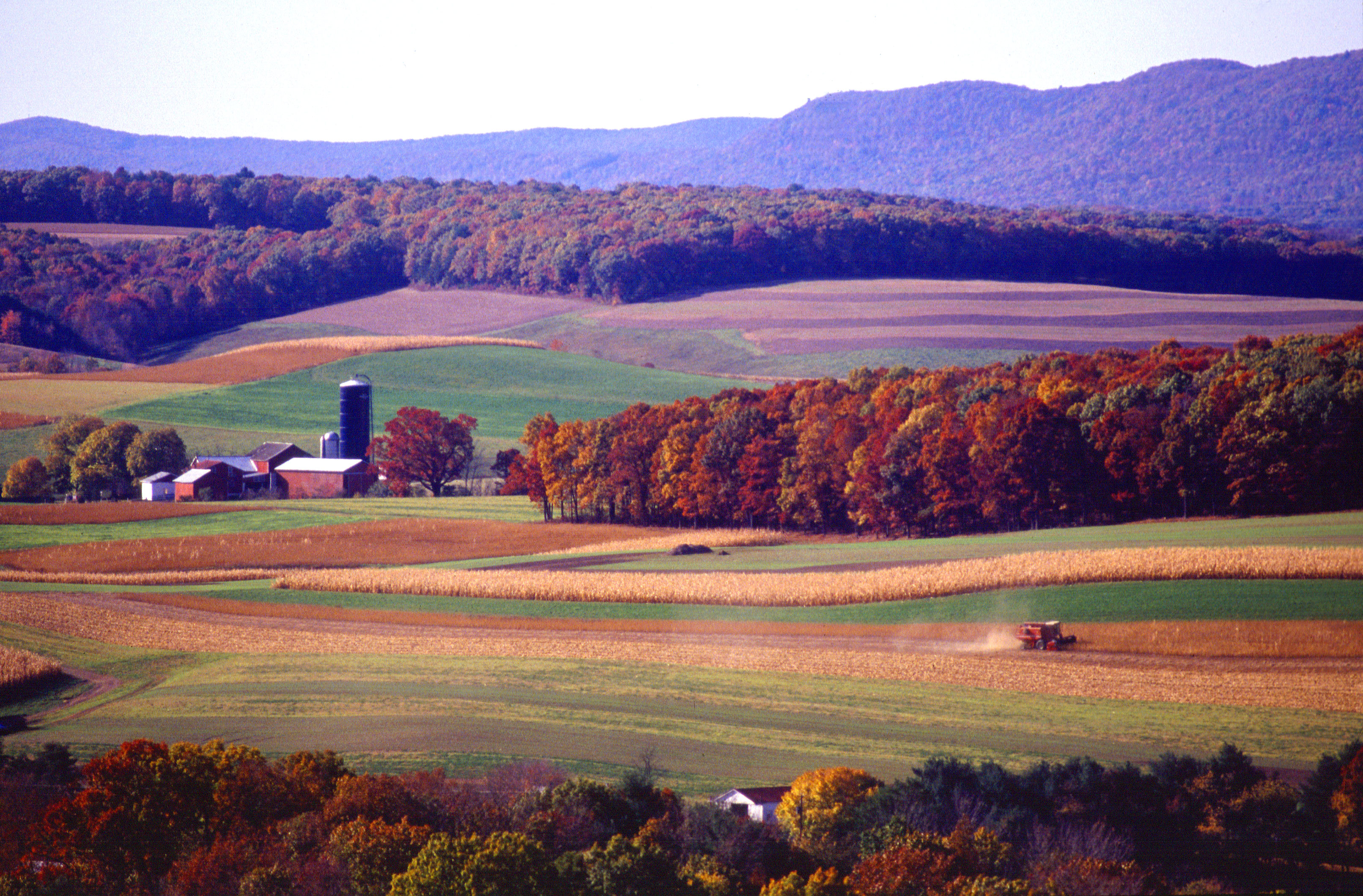
- A farm near Klingerstown
- Nickname: Spread Eagle
- Location within the U.S. state of Pennsylvania Klingerstown (the United States)
- Coordinates: 40°39′39″N 76°41′37″W
- Country: United States
- State: Pennsylvania
- County: Schuylkill
- Township: Upper Mahantongo

Area
  - Total: 0.48 sq mi (1.25 km^{2})
  - Land: 0.48 sq mi (1.25 km^{2})
  - Water: 0 sq mi (0.00 km^{2})

Population (2020)
  - Total: 101
  - Density: 208.6/sq mi (80.54/km^{2})
- Time zone: UTC-5 (Eastern (EST))
  - Summer (DST): UTC-4 (EDT)
- ZIP codes: 17941
- Area code: 570
- FIPS code: 42-40136

Klingerstown (Pennsylvania German: Glingerschteddel) is a census-designated place (CDP) in Upper Mahantongo Township, Schuylkill County, Pennsylvania, United States. As of the 2000 census, the CDP population was 102.

== Geography ==
Klingerstown is located at 40°39′39″N 76°41′37″W (40.660835, -76.693498).

According to the United States Census Bureau, the CDP has a total area of 0.4 square miles (1.0 km^{2}), all land.

== Demographics ==
Historical population
Census	Pop.	Note	%±
2020	101		—
U.S. Decennial Census

At the 2000 census there were 102 people, 40 households, and 26 families living in the CDP. The population density was 242.2 inhabitants per square mile (93.5/km^{2}). There were 45 housing units at an average density of 106.8 per square mile (41.2/km^{2}). The racial makeup of the CDP was 100.00% White. Of the 40 households 35.0% had children under the age of 18 living with them, 50.0% were married couples living together, 10.0% had a female householder with no husband present, and 35.0% were non-families. 27.5% of households were one person and 25.0% were one person aged 65 or older. The average household size was 2.55 and the average family size was 2.92.

The age distribution was 24.5% under the age of 18, 5.9% from 18 to 24, 33.3% from 25 to 44, 12.7% from 45 to 64, and 23.5% 65 or older. The median age was 36 years. For every 100 females, there were 78.9 males. For every 100 females age 18 and over, there were 79.1 males.

The median household income was $30,833 and the median family income was $31,667. Males had a median income of $23,750 versus $18,750 for females. The per capita income for the CDP was $12,276. There were 11.5% of families and 15.6% of the population living below the poverty line, including 21.4% of under eighteens and 15.0% of those over 64.

== Education ==
Klingerstown is part of the Tri-Valley School District, which has elementary buildings in Klingerstown and Valley View. The high school building is located in Hegins.

== Local events ==
Every year the town sponsors a Fireman's Parade and Carnival and a fishing rodeo. The town church, St. Michael's Lutheran Church, sponsors various activities in the town also. Recently church members volunteered to repaint houses in town.
