= Upper Mahantongo Township, Pennsylvania =

Township in Pennsylvania, US

Coordinates: 40°40′00″N 76°37′59″W

- Township
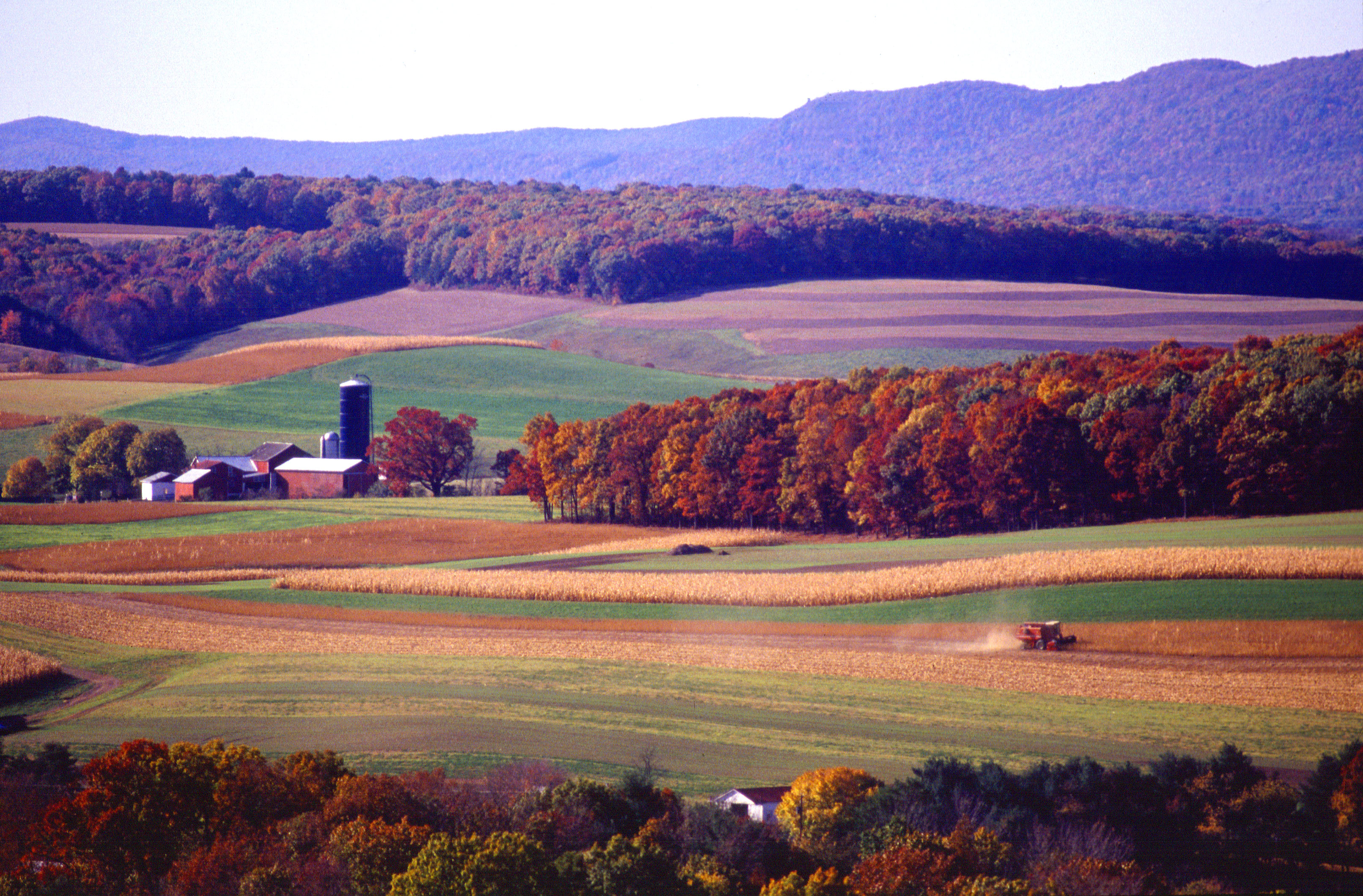
- A farm near Klingerstown

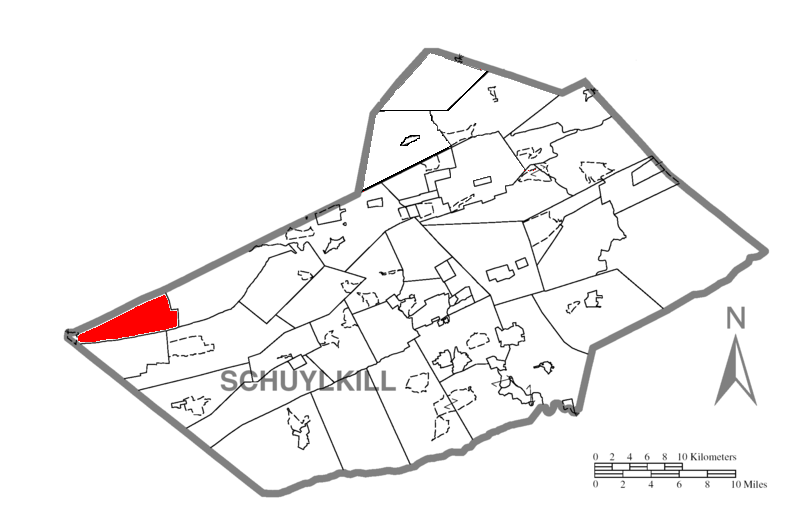
- Map of Schuylkill County, Pennsylvania Highlighting Upper Mahantongo Township

- Map of Schuylkill County, Pennsylvania
- Country: United States
- State: Pennsylvania
- County: Schuylkill
- Settled: 1780
- Incorporated: 1811

Area
  - Total: 14.85 sq mi (38.46 km^{2})
  - Land: 14.85 sq mi (38.46 km^{2})
  - Water: 0 sq mi (0.00 km^{2})

Population (2020)
  - Total: 614 ▼
  - Estimate (2021): 614
  - Density: 42/sq mi (16.3/km^{2})
- Time zone: UTC-5 (Eastern (EST))
  - Summer (DST): UTC-4 (EDT)
- FIPS code: 42-107-79120

Upper Mahantongo Township is a township that is located in Schuylkill County, Pennsylvania, United States. The population was 614 at the time of the 2020 census.

== Geography ==
According to the United States Census Bureau, the township has a total area of 14.8 square miles (38.4 km^{2}), all land. It contains the census-designated place of Klingerstown.

== Demographics ==
Historical population
Census	Pop.	Note	%±
2010	655		—
2020	614		−6.3%
2021 (est.)	614		0.0%
U.S. Decennial Census

At the 2000 census, there were 652 people, 250 households and 193 families living in the township. The population density was 44.0 inhabitants per square mile (17.0/km^{2}). There were 276 housing units at an average density of 18.6/sq mi (7.2/km^{2}). The racial makeup of the township was 100.00% White. Hispanic or Latino of any race were 0.61% of the population.

There were 250 households, of which 32.0% had children under the age of 18 living with them, 65.6% were married couples living together, 6.0% had a female householder with no husband present, and 22.4% were non-families. 18.0% of all households were made up of individuals, and 12.8% had someone living alone who was 65 years of age or older. The average household size was 2.61 and the average family size was 2.91.

22.1% of the population were under the age of 18, 8.3% from 18 to 24, 28.2% from 25 to 44, 22.9% from 45 to 64, and 18.6% who were 65 years of age or older. The median age was 39 years. For every 100 females, there were 98.2 males. For every 100 females age 18 and over, there were 94.6 males.

The median household income was $35,658 and the median family income was $37,500. Males had a median income of $34,125 versus $21,488 for females. The per capita income for the township was $14,478. About 10.0% of families and 11.8% of the population were below the poverty line, including 11.0% of those under age 18 and 17.9% of those age 65 or over.
