= Pine Creek (Mahantango Creek tributary) =

River in Pennsylvania

Coordinates: 40°39′46″N 76°41′43″W

Pine Creek is a tributary of Mahantango Creek in Schuylkill and Dauphin counties, Pennsylvania, in the United States. It is approximately 23.7 miles (38.1 km) long. The creek flows through Foster Township, Hegins Township, Hubley Township, and Upper Mahantango Township in Schuylkill County and Lykens Township in Dauphin County. The creek's watershed has an area of 76.8 square miles (199 km^{2}) and its tributaries include Rausch Creek and Deep Creek. Pine Creek is considered by the Pennsylvania Department of Environmental Protection to be impaired by abandoned mine drainage and resource extraction. However, it is designated as a coldwater fishery.

== Course ==
Pine Creek begins in southwestern Foster Township, Schuylkill County, near Interstate 81. The creek heads west-southwest into a valley, entering Hegins Township, where it passes through Dell Lake. Some distance downstream, the valley broadens significantly and the creek turns west. The creek continues west for many miles, flowing parallel to Good Spring Mountain. It passes by the community of Valley View and receives the tributary Rausch Creek and continues west, entering Hubley Township. In Hubley Township, the creek passes near the community of Sacramento. A few miles further on, it crosses Pennsylvania Route 25, passes through the community of Spring Glen, and begins meandering northwest, away from Good Spring Mountain. The creek receives the tributary Deep Creek there. Further downstream, Pine Creek leaves Schuylkill County.

Upon leaving Schuylkill County, Pine Creek enters Lykens Township, Dauphin County. Here, the creek flows west for a short distance before turning north. It then cuts through a ridge and re-enters Schuylkill County, this time in Upper Mahantango Township. A short distance downstream, the creek reaches its confluence with Mahantango Creek.

Pine Creek joins Mahantango Creek 17.16 miles (27.62 km) upstream of its mouth.

=== Tributaries ===
Tributaries of Pine Creek include Rausch Creek and Deep Creek. Rausch Creek joins Pine Creek 13.32 miles (21.44 km) upstream of its mouth and its watershed has an area of 9.55 square miles (24.7 km^{2}). Deep Creek reaches its confluence with Pine Creek 8.14 miles (13.10 km) upstream of the latter creek's mouth. The watershed of this tributary has an area of 31.80 square miles (82.4 km^{2}).

== Hydrology and metals ==
Pine Creek is considered by the Pennsylvania Department of Environmental Protection to be impaired by abandoned mine drainage and resource extraction. Most of the creek is considered to be impaired, as is the entirety of the tributary Rausch Creek. One of Pine Creek's subtributaries in the Deep Creek sub-watershed is also impaired. The rest of the steams in the watershed are not considered by the Pennsylvania Department of Environmental Protection to be impaired.

South of the community of Fountain, the daily load of aluminum in the waters of Pine Creek is 29.86 pounds (13.54 kg). At the Gap School Road Bridge, the aluminum load is 109.64 pounds (49.73 kg) per day and the daily load is 237.48 pounds (107.72 kg) at the Schwenks Road bridge. At the Pennsylvania Route 25 Bridge near the community of Spring Glen, the daily load is 269.67 pounds (122.32 kg). At the end of State Route 4015, the daily load of aluminum is 531.36 pounds (241.02 kg) and at the Michaels Food Products Bridge in Klingerstown, it is 380.03 pounds (172.38 kg).

South of the community of Fountain, the daily load of manganese in the waters of Pine Creek is 0.77 pounds (0.35 kg). At the Gap School Road Bridge, the aluminum load is 8.57 pounds (3.89 kg) per day and the daily load is 135.97 pounds (61.67 kg) at the Schwenks Road Bridge. At the Pennsylvania Route 25 Bridge near the community of Spring Glen, the daily load is 75.73 pounds (34.35 kg). At the end of State Route 4015, the daily load of aluminum is 79.30 pounds (35.97 kg) and at the Michaels Food Products Bridge in Klingerstown, it is 54.53 pounds (24.73 kg).

South of the community of Fountain, the daily load of iron in the waters of Pine Creek is 4.26 pounds (1.93 kg). At the Gap School Road Bridge, the aluminum load is 24.84 pounds (11.27 kg) per day and the daily load is 114.58 pounds (51.97 kg) at the Schwenks Road Bridge. At the Pennsylvania Route 25 Bridge near the community of Spring Glen, the daily load is 110.90 pounds (50.30 kg). At the end of State Route 4015, the daily load of aluminum is 147.08 pounds (66.71 kg) and at the Michaels Food Products Bridge in Klingerstown, it is 132.83 pounds (60.25 kg).

== Hydrology, pH, acidity, and discharge ==
South of the community of Fountain, the daily load of acidity in the waters of Pine Creek is 272.61 pounds (123.65 kg). At the Gap School Road bridge, the aluminum load is 1,045.61 pounds (474.28 kg) per day and the daily load is 4,479.76 pounds (2,031.98 kg) at the Schwenks Road bridge. At the Pennsylvania Route 25 bridge near the community of Spring Glen, the daily load is 5,085.31 pounds (2,306.66 kg). At the end of State Route 4015, the daily load of aluminum is 10,250.18 pounds (4,649.40 kg) and at the Michaels Food Products Bridge in Klingerstown, it is 9,801.75 pounds (4,446.00 kg).

The pH of Pine Creek south of the community of Fountain ranges from 6.2 to 7.1. The creek's pH ranges from 6.5 to 7 at the Gap School Road bridge and at the Schwenks Road bridge, the pH ranges from 6.65 to 6.9. The pH ranges between 6.2 and 6.9 at the Pennsylvania Route 25 bridge near the community of Spring Glen and it ranges from 6.5 to 7 at the end of State Route 4015. At the Michaels Food Products Bridge in Klingerstown, the pH ranges between 6.3 and 6.9.

The discharge of Pine Creek south of the community of Fountain is 2364.5 gallons per minute. The creek's discharge is 8,706.47 US gallons (32,957.6 L; 7,249.65 imp gal) per minute at the Gap School Road bridge and at the Schwenks Road Bridge, the discharge is 18,807.06 US gallons (71,192.5 L; 15,660.15 imp gal) per minute. It is 20,099.86 US gallons (76,086.2 L; 16,736.63 imp gal) per minute at the Pennsylvania Route 25 Bridge near the community of Spring Glen and is 42,252.4 US gallons (159,943 L; 35,182.5 imp gal) per minute at the end of State Route 4015. At the Michaels Food Products Bridge in Klingerstown, the discharge is 48,122.62 US gallons (182,163.9 L; 40,070.46 imp gal) per minute.

== Geography and geology ==
The elevation near the mouth of Pine Creek is 440 feet (130 m) above sea level. The elevation of the creek's source is between 1,560 feet (480 m) and 1,580 feet (480 m). The elevation of the creek decreases at a rate of 180 feet (55 m) per mile from its source to 18 river miles. From that point to the mouth, the rate of elevation decrease is 16 feet (4.9 m) per mile.

The watershed of Pine Creek is within the Anthracite Uplands section of the Ridge-and-Valley Appalachians physiological province.

The headwaters of Pine Creek are located in Hegins Valley. This valley is situated between Mahantango Mountain and Broad Mountain. The tributary Deep Creek is also in Hegins Valley, being separated from Pine Creek by a low ridge within the valley. Pine Creek also flows through a water gap in Mahantango Mountain near its mouth.

The main rock types in the watershed of Pine Creek are interbedded sedimentary rock and sandstone. The soils in the watershed are well-drained and permeable. The Lykens Valley coal seam, which is part of the Pottsville Formation, is found in the watershed's southeastern portion. This is the only coal seam in the watershed.

The channel of Pine Creek is tortuous. The creek's bottom is rocky or sandy. Riffles and pools occur along it.

== Watershed ==
The watershed of Pine Creek has an area of 76.8 square miles (199 km^{2}). The watershed is on the United States Geological Survey 7.5 minute quadrangles of Klingerstown, Lykens, Minersville, Tower City, Tremont, and Valley View. The watershed of Pine Creek is situated in western Schuylkill County and northeastern Dauphin County.

The topography of the Pine Creek watershed is described as "rough and hilly" in a 1921 book.

The communities in the watershed of Pine Creek include Valley View, Hegins, Klingerstown, and Sacramento. In 1921, these communities had populations of 580, 400, 204, and 202, respectively.

== History ==
Underground mining of anthracite was being done in the watershed of Pine Creek by the middle of the nineteenth century. In the twenty-first century, there is one mining permit in the watershed. It belongs to the Pine Creek Coal Company.

In the early 1900s, the main industries in the watershed of Pine Creek were coal mines and agriculture. The creek was also used as water power for a number of mills.

== Biology ==
Pine Creek is designated for use by aquatic life. It is also designated as a coldwater fishery.

There are few pine trees along Pine Creek, with groves of hemlock being present instead. Some of the hemlock trees along the creek have trunks that are over 3 feet (0.91 m).

== Recreation ==
It is possible to canoe on at least 13.5 miles (21.7 km) of Pine Creek during the winter, during snowmelts or soon after heavy rains. Edward Gertler describes the creek as a "diminutive novice run" in his book Keystone Canoeing. Gertler describes the scenery along the creek as "good". However, there are electric fences and deadfalls on it.

== See also ==
- List of rivers of Pennsylvania
