= Joanne Stehr =

American politician

Member of the Pennsylvania House of Representatives from the 107th district
- Incumbent
- Assumed office January 3, 2023
- Preceded by: Kurt Masser

Personal details
- Party: Republican
- Spouse: Divorced
- Children: 2
- Occupation: Nurse
- Website: repstehr.com

Joanne C. Stehr is an American politician serving as a member of the Pennsylvania House of Representatives for the 107th district. Elected in November 2022, she assumed office on January 3, 2023. She is noted as being the first female legislator to ever represent any part of Schuylkill County, Pennsylvania.

== Early life ==
Stehr attended Tri-Valley Junior/Senior High School graduating as part of their class of 1982. She then attended the Schuylkill county area vocational technical school where she received her license to become a practicing nurse.

== Political career ==
Stehr ran on a platform of lowering taxes, implementing term limits, and protecting the second amendment. In what many considered an upset, she defeated a primary challenger, Ron Tanney, with almost a 7% margin before facing Democrat Ryan Mock in the general election. She would defeat him with almost a 50% margin.

Since being elected, she has opened two district offices, one in Shamokin, Pennsylvania and another in Hegins, Pennsylvania.

== Comments Calling Human Beings Trash ==
In January 2026, at a townhall event in her constituency held over concerns about the planned conversion of a warehouse into an I.C.E. detention facility, Stehr compared people arrested by ICE to trash and was booed by the locals in attendance: "Do I think it should be going in our backyard? Probably not ... I'm saying ICE has a job to do, and it's going to get done. We are taking out the trash.”

== Personal life ==
Stehr is divorced and lives in a home she inherited from her parents. She has two sons, Eli and Beau.

The name Stehr is of German origin, and Stehr is descendant from immigrants.

== Electoral history ==
PA House election, 2022 Republican Primary: Pennsylvania House, District 107
Party	Candidate	Votes	%
Republican	Joanne Stehr	5,029	53.3%
Republican	Ron Tanney	4,382	46.44%
Margin of victory		647	6.86%
Turnout		9,411	100%

PA House election, 2022: Pennsylvania House, District 107
Party	Candidate	Votes	%
Republican	Joanne Stehr	18,246	74.4%
Democratic	Ryan Mock	6,025	24.6%
Margin of victory		12,221	49.8%
Turnout		24,271	100%
