= Hegins, Pennsylvania =

Unincorporated community in Pennsylvania, US

Coordinates: 40°39′05″N 76°29′51″W

Hegins, Pennsylvania pronounced Hēgins
- Census-designated place
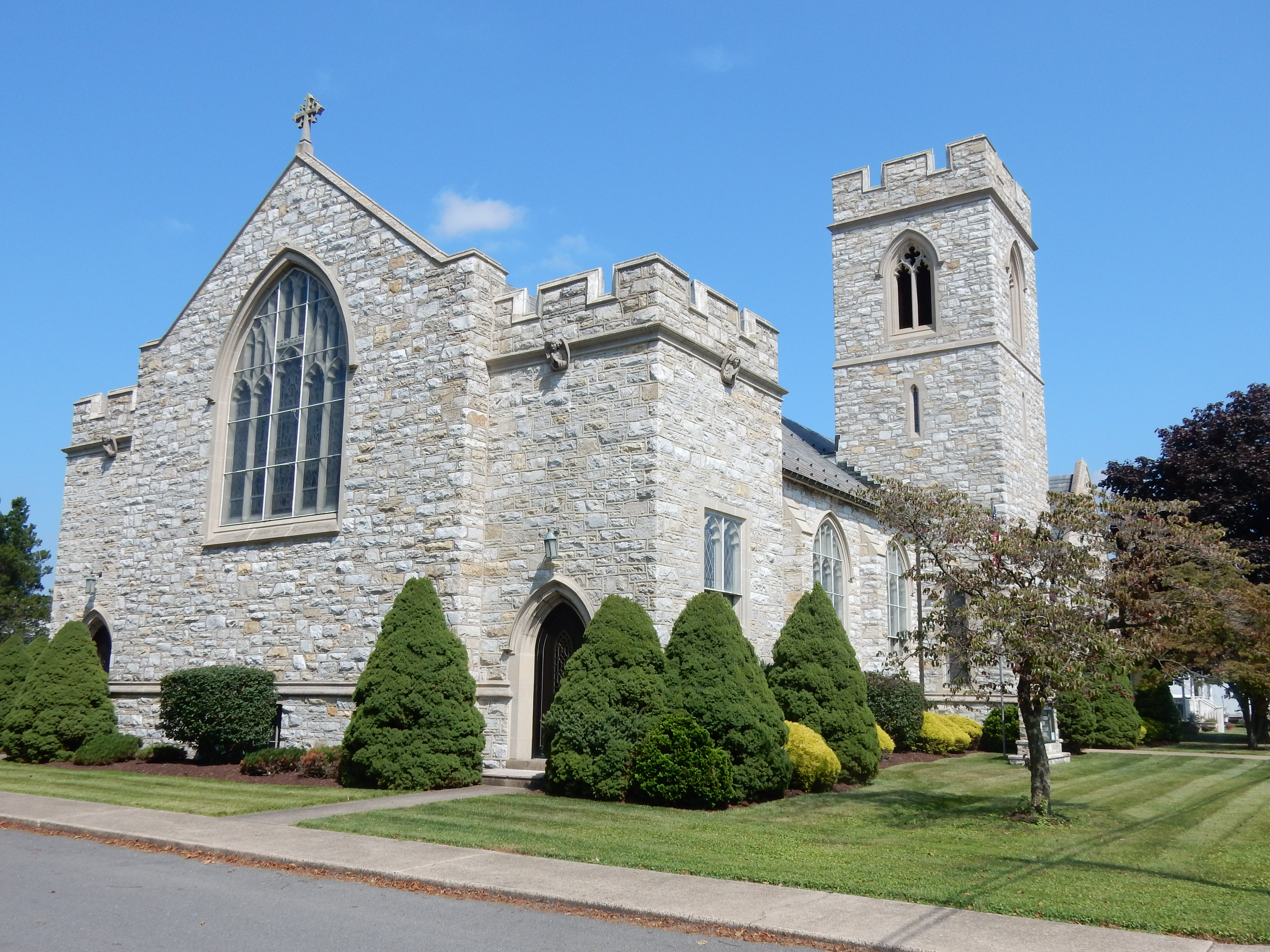
- Friedens United Church of Christ in Hegins.
- Interactive map of Hegins, Pennsylvania pronounced Hēgins
- Country: United States
- State: Pennsylvania
- County: Schuylkill

Area
  - Total: 2.00 sq mi (5.17 km^{2})
  - Land: 2.00 sq mi (5.17 km^{2})
  - Water: 0 sq mi (0.00 km^{2})

Population (2020)
  - Total: 798
  - Density: 399.9/sq mi (154.41/km^{2})
- Time zone: UTC-5 (Eastern (EST))
  - Summer (DST): UTC-4 (EDT)
- ZIP code: 17938
- Area code: 570
- FIPS code: 42-33576

Hegins (pronounced Higgins) is a census-designated place located in Hegins Township, Schuylkill County in the state of Pennsylvania, United States. The community is located near the community of Valley View at the intersection of Pennsylvania Routes 25 and 125 and is approximately 50 miles northeast of Harrisburg. As of the 2020 census the population was 798 residents.

Historical population
Census	Pop.	Note	%±
2020	798		—
U.S. Decennial Census

== Education ==
The school district is Tri-Valley School District.

== Gallery ==
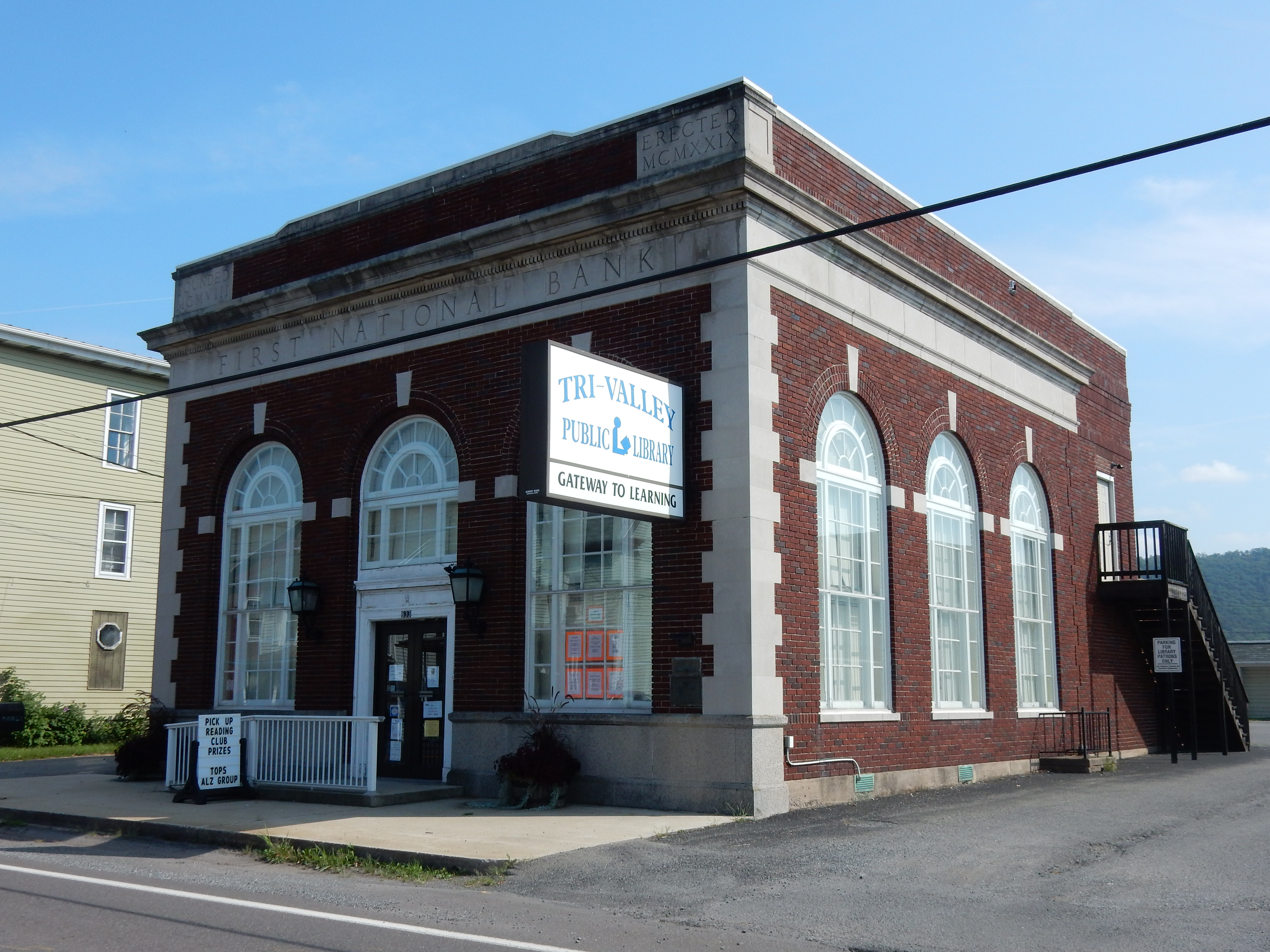
Tri-Valley Public Library.

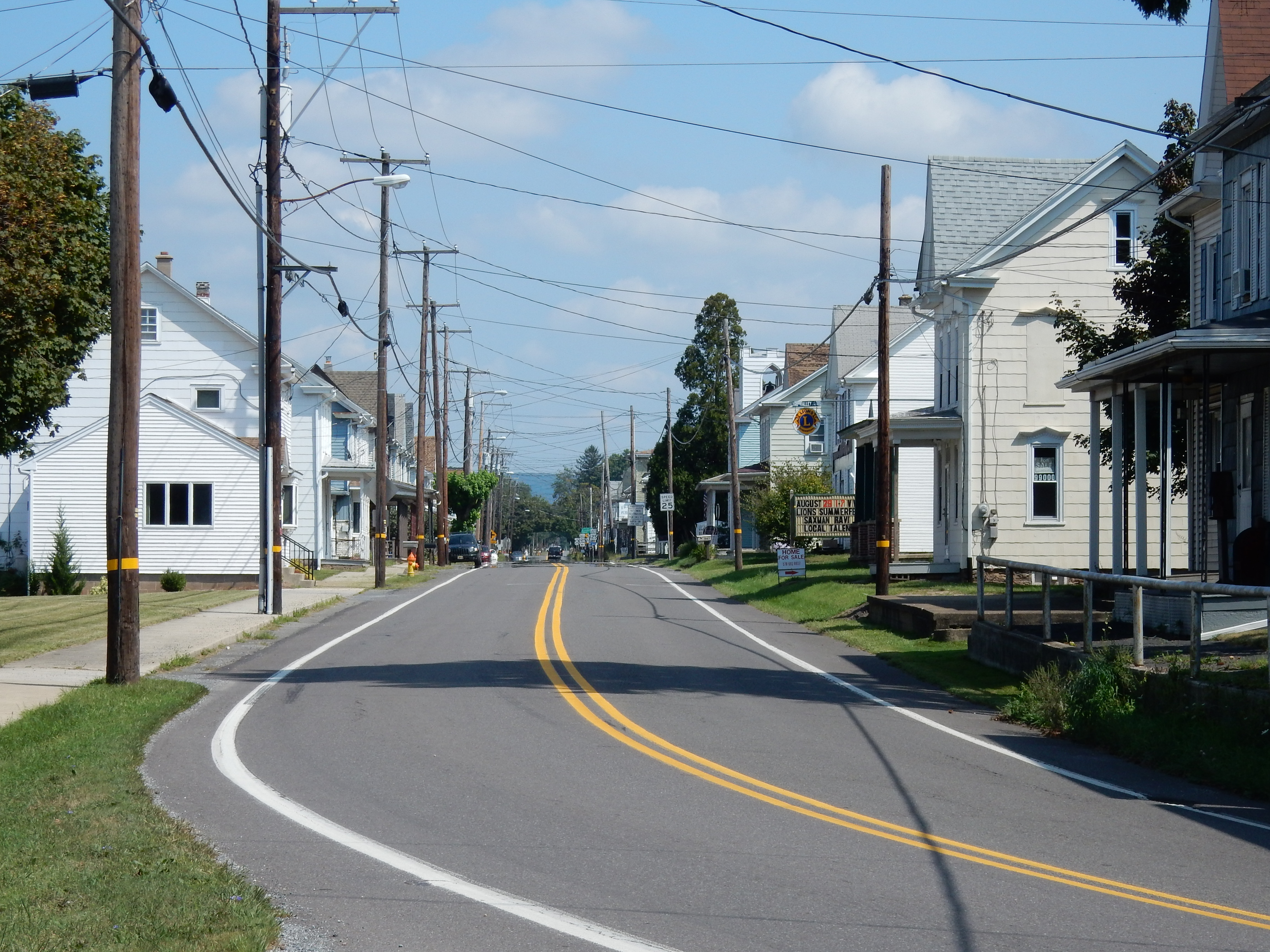
East Main Street in Hegins.

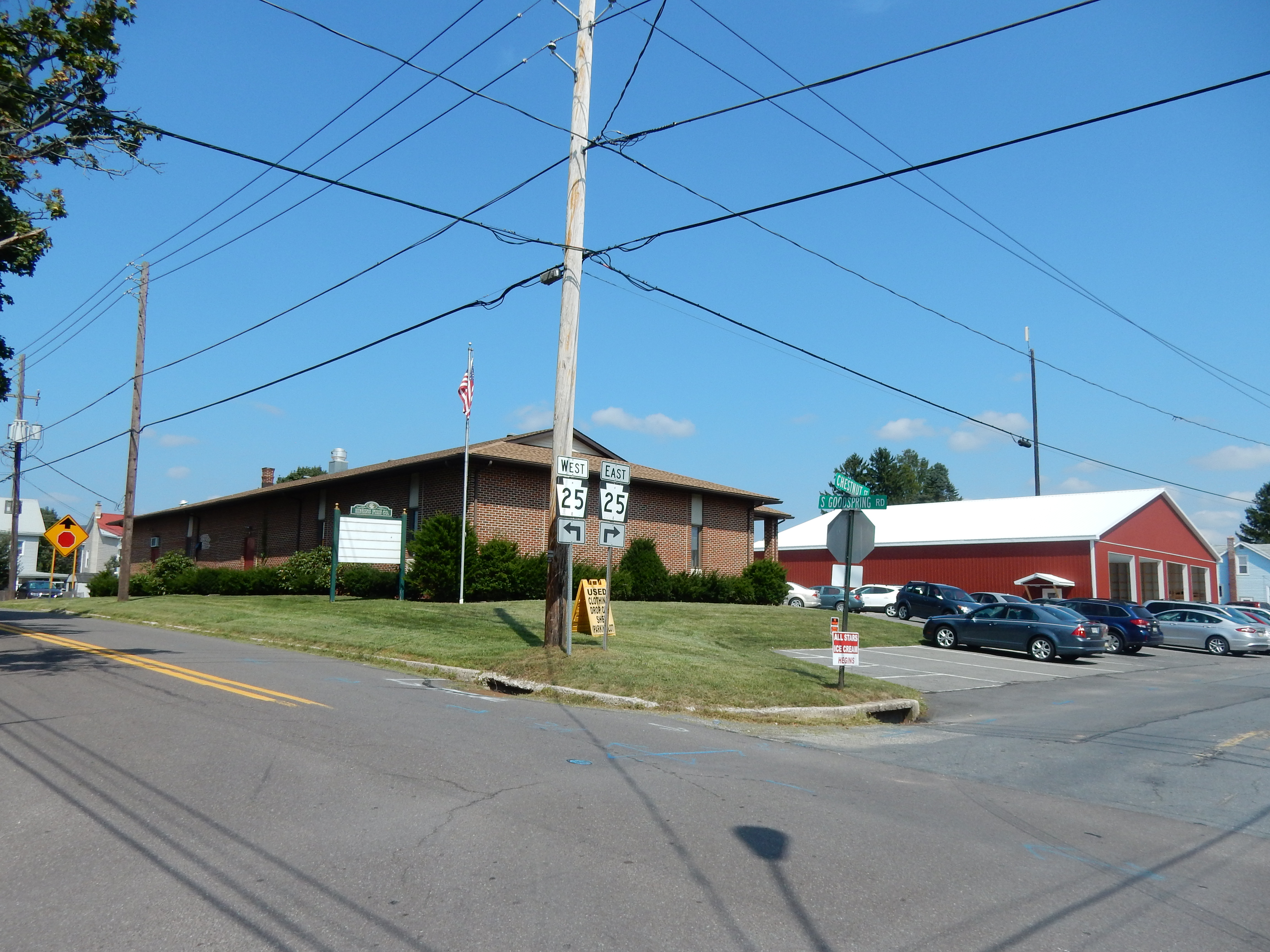
Hegins Fire Co.
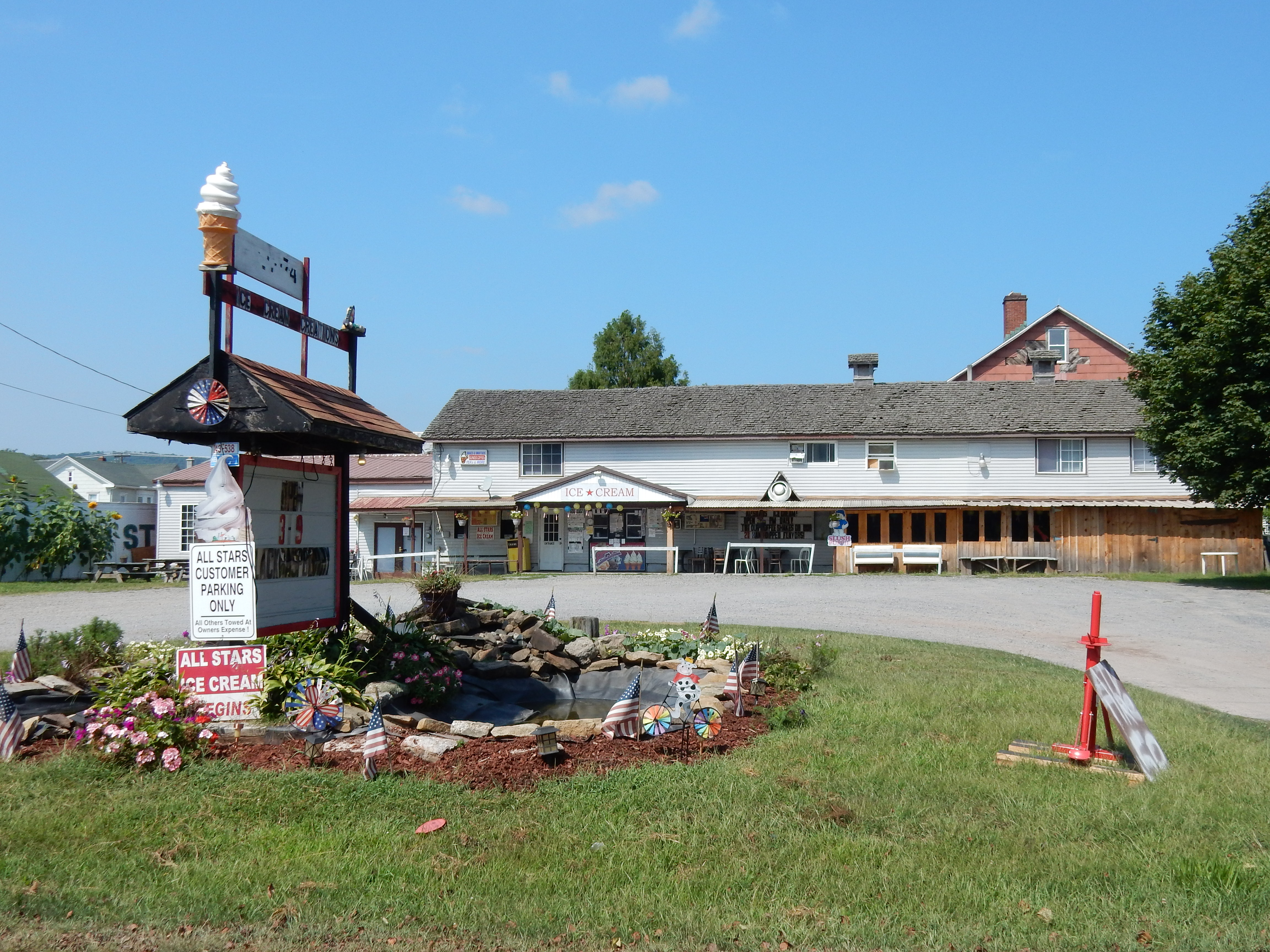
Cafe on Chestnut St.

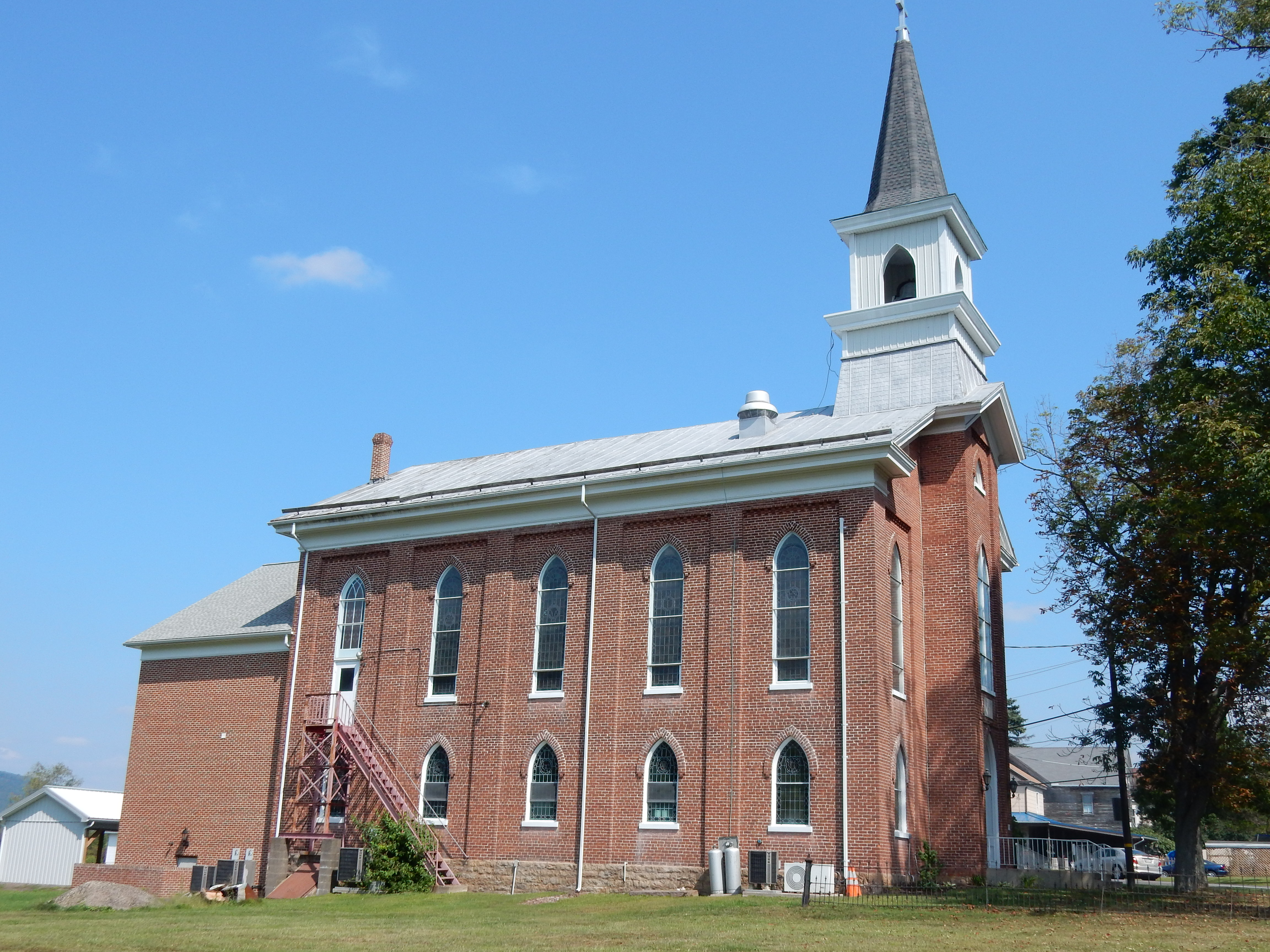
Friedens Evangelical Lutheran Church.

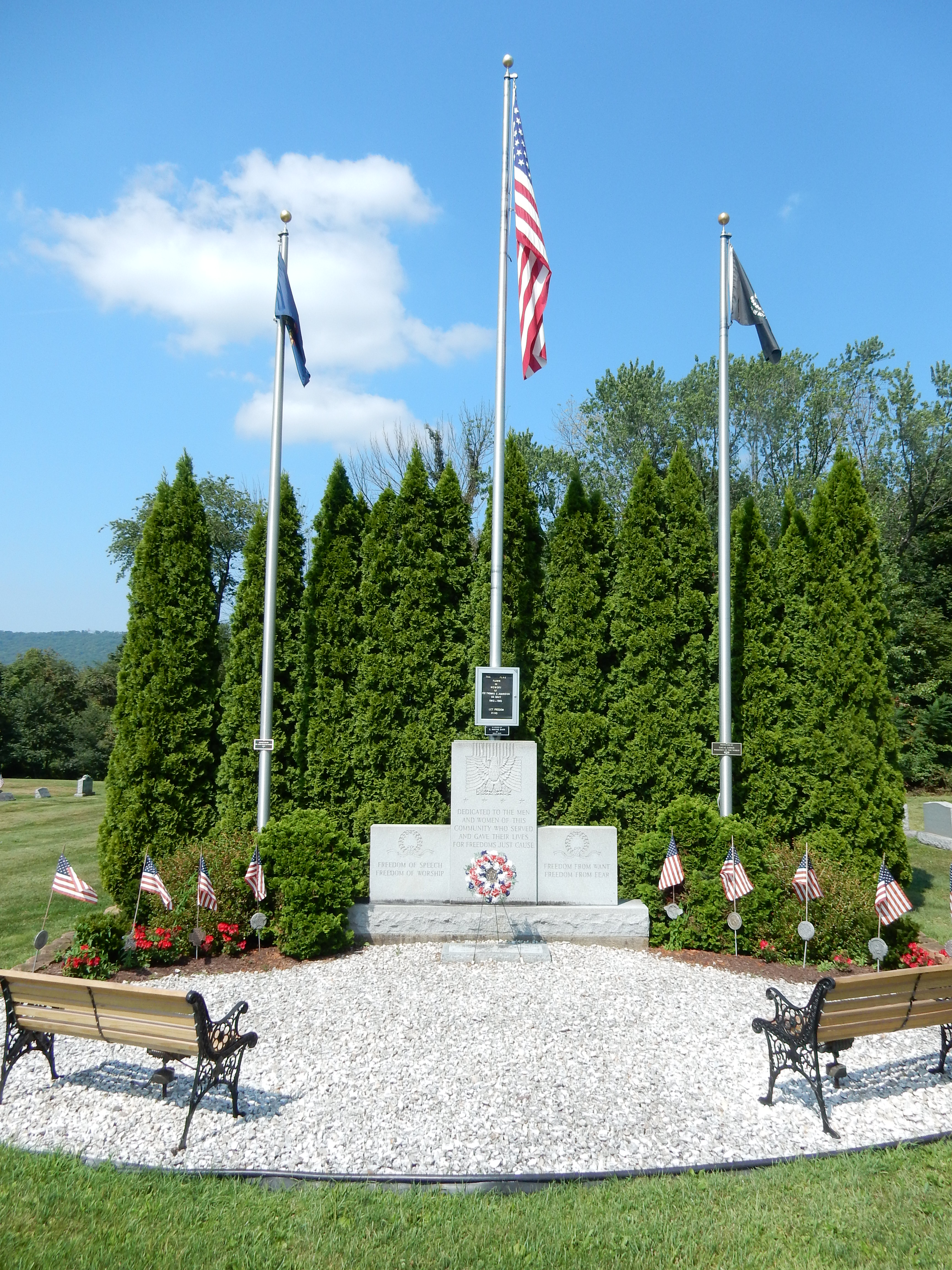
War Memorial at Friedens Cemetery.
