= Pennsylvania House of Representatives, District 107 =

Legislative district in Pennsylvania, United States

Pennsylvania's 107th State House of Representatives district
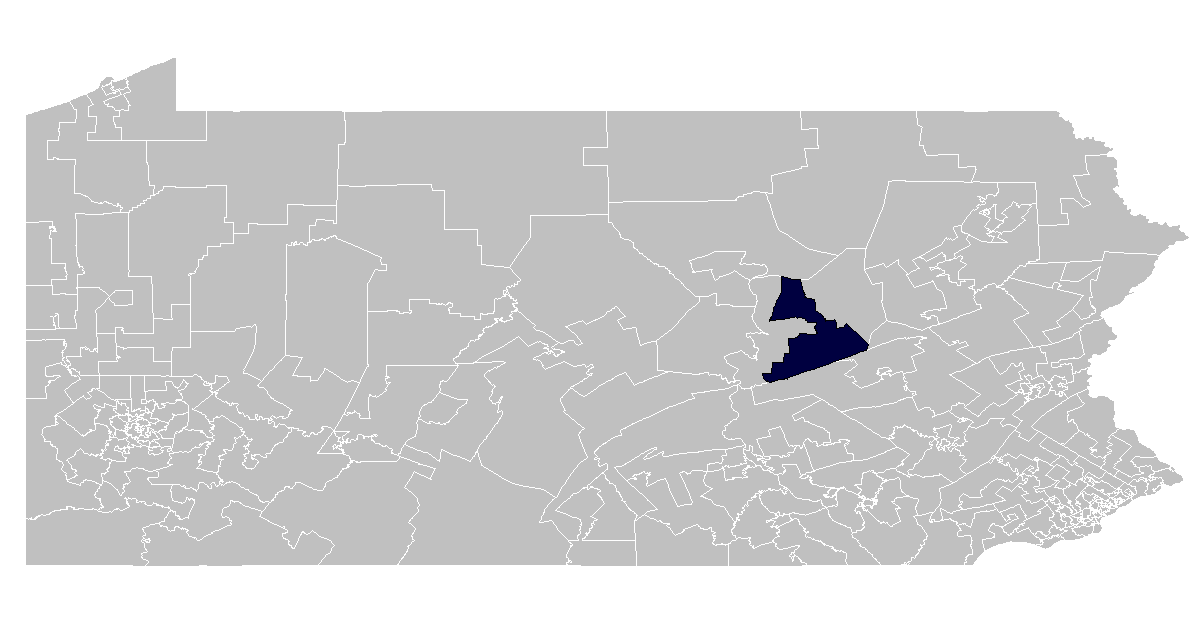
Representative
Joanne Stehr; R–Hegins Township
- Demographics: 95.5% White; 2.3% Black; 1.6% Hispanic
- Population (2011) • Citizens of voting age: 64,693; 51,623

The 107th Pennsylvania House of Representatives District is located in the Coal Region and has been represented since 2023 by Joanne Stehr.

== District profile ==
The 107th Pennsylvania House of Representatives District is located in Northumberland County and Schuylkill County. It is made up of the following areas:

- Northumberland County
  - Coal Township
  - East Cameron Township
  - Jackson Township
  - Jordan Township
  - Herndon
  - Little Mahanoy Township
  - Lower Augusta Township
  - Lower Mahanoy Township
  - Kulpmont
  - Marion Heights
  - Mount Carmel
  - Mount Carmel Township
  - Ralpho Township
  - Shamokin
  - Shamokin Township
  - Upper Mahanoy Township
  - Washington Township
  - West Cameron Township
  - Zerbe Township
- Schuylkill County
  - Barry Township
  - Eldred Township
  - Foster Township
  - Frailey Township
  - Hegins Township
  - Hubley Township
  - Pine Grove
  - Pine Grove Township
  - Porter Township
  - Reilly Township
  - Tower City
  - Tremont
  - Tremont Township
  - Upper Mahantongo Township
  - Washington Township

== Representatives ==
Representative	Party	Years	District home	Note
Prior to 1969, seats were apportioned by county.
Paul G. Ruane	Republican	1969 – 1974		
Joseph P. Bradley, Jr.	Democrat	1975 – 1976		
Edward Helfrick	Republican	1977 – 1980		
Robert E. Belfanti, Jr.	Democrat	1981 – 2010	Mount Carmel	
Kurt Masser	Republican	2010 – 2023		
Joanne Stehr	Republican	2023 – present		

== Recent election results ==
PA House election, 2010: Pennsylvania House, District 107
Party	Candidate	Votes	%	±%
Republican	Kurt Masser	543	72.02	
Democratic	George Zalar	211	27.98	
Margin of victory		332	44.22	
Turnout		754	100	

PA House election, 2012: Pennsylvania House, District 107
Party	Candidate	Votes	%	±%
Republican	Kurt Masser	597	60.79	
Democratic	Ted Yeager	385	39.21	
Margin of victory		212	21.58	▼22.64
Turnout		982	100	

PA House election, 2014: Pennsylvania House, District 107
Party	Candidate	Votes	%	±%
Republican	Kurt Masser	817	78.63	
Democratic	John Burd	222	21.37	
Margin of victory		595	57.26	▲35.68
Turnout		1,039	100	

PA House election, 2016: Pennsylvania House, District 107
Party	Candidate	Votes	%	±%
Republican	Kurt Masser	1,329	76.03	
Democratic	Michael Krankowski	419	23.97	
Margin of victory		910	52.06	▼5.20
Turnout		1,748	100	
