= Tri-Valley School District =

School district in Pennsylvania, United States

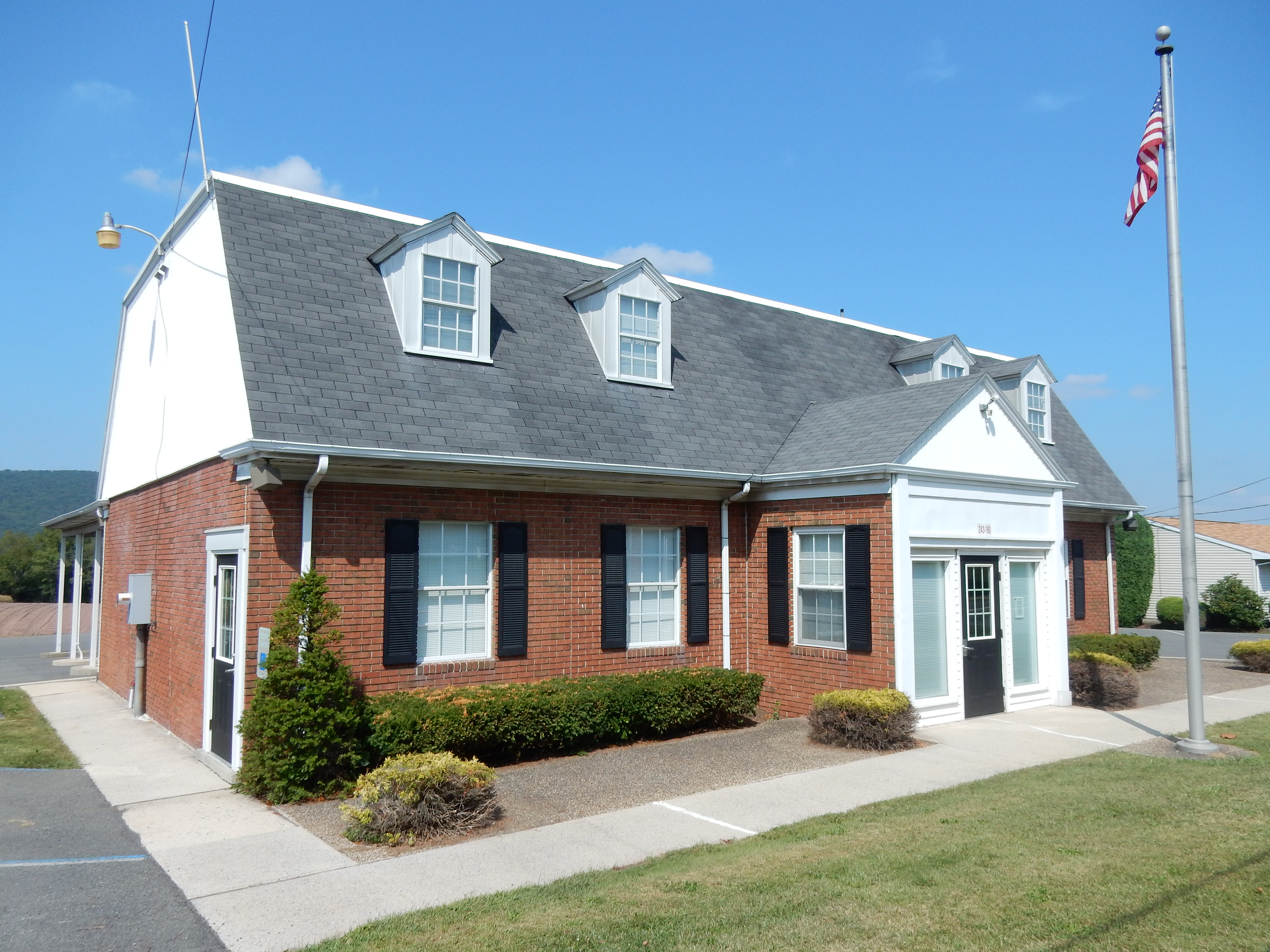
- District offices

Address
- 110 West Main Street Valley View, Schuylkill County, Pennsylvania, 17983; United States

District information
- Type: Public

Other information
- Website: www.tri-valley.k12.pa.us

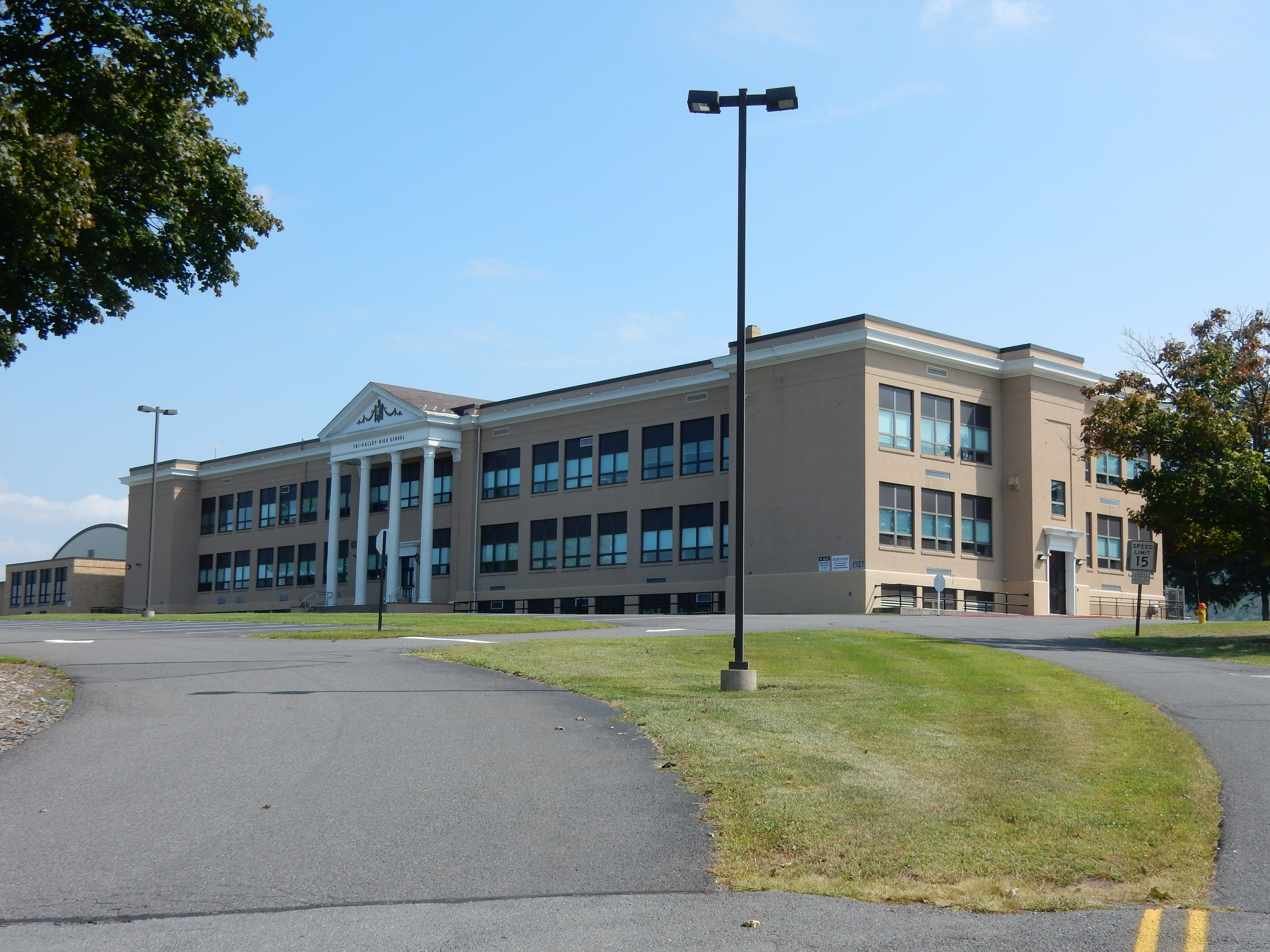
Tri-Valley High School

The Tri-Valley School District is a public school district in Schuylkill County, Pennsylvania. It serves the municipalities of Eldred, Hegins, Hubley, Barry, and Upper Mahantongo Townships. The district features two elementary schools and one combined junior/senior high school.
