= Paul Ruane =

American politician

Paul G. Ruane

Member of the Pennsylvania House of Representatives from the 107th district
- In office 1969–1974
- Preceded by: District created
- Succeeded by: Joseph P. Bradley, Jr.

Member of the Pennsylvania House of Representatives from the Northumberland County district
- In office 1965–1968

Personal details
- Born: July 31, 1933 Carbondale, Pennsylvania
- Died: August 23, 2000 (aged 67) Coal Township, Northumberland County, Pennsylvania
- Party: Republican

Paul G. Ruane (July 31, 1933 – August 23, 2000) was a former Republican member of the Pennsylvania House of Representatives.
