= Joseph P. Bradley Jr. =

American politician

Member of the Pennsylvania House of Representatives from the 107th district
- In office 1975–1976
- Preceded by: Paul Ruane
- Succeeded by: Edward Helfrick

Personal details
- Born: November 27, 1926 Shamokin, Pennsylvania
- Died: January 8, 1994 (aged 67) Northumberland County, Pennsylvania
- Party: Democratic

Joseph P. Bradley Jr. (November 27, 1926 – January 8, 1994) is a former Democratic member of the Pennsylvania House of Representatives. He graduated from Mount Carmel Catholic High School and later attended Scranton University. He was elected as a Democrat to the Pennsylvania House of Representatives for the 1975 term; unsuccessful campaign for reelection to the House (1976). He was born in 1926 in Shamokin, Pennsylvania. Joseph P. Bradley Jr. died January 8, 1994 in Mount Carmel, Northumberland County, Pennsylvania.
