= Robert Belfanti =

American politician

Member of the Pennsylvania House of Representatives from the 107th district
- In office January 2, 1979 – 2010
- Preceded by: Edward Helfrick
- Succeeded by: Kurt Masser

Personal details
- Born: October 15, 1948 Danville, Pennsylvania, U.S.
- Died: October 29, 2016 (aged 68) Mount Carmel, Pennsylvania, U.S.
- Party: Democratic
- Spouse: Cecilia Belfanti
- Children: Robert Belfanti III, Eric Belfanti
- Occupation: Politician

Robert E. Belfanti Jr. (October 15, 1948 – October 29, 2016) was a Democratic member of the Pennsylvania House of Representatives.

== Background ==
Born in Danville, Pennsylvania, Belfanti graduated from Mount Carmel High School. From 1967 to 1971, Belfanti served in the United States Marine Corps. In 1970 and 1971, Belfanti went to University of North Carolina. He was a residential contractor. He died on October 29, 2016, at the age of 68.

== Arson of district office ==
On March 23, 2008, Belfanti's district office was damaged by fire in an arson set by a man who had been upset about the results of a child custody case in Huntingdon County, Pennsylvania.
