= Kurt Masser =

American politician

Kurt A. Masser
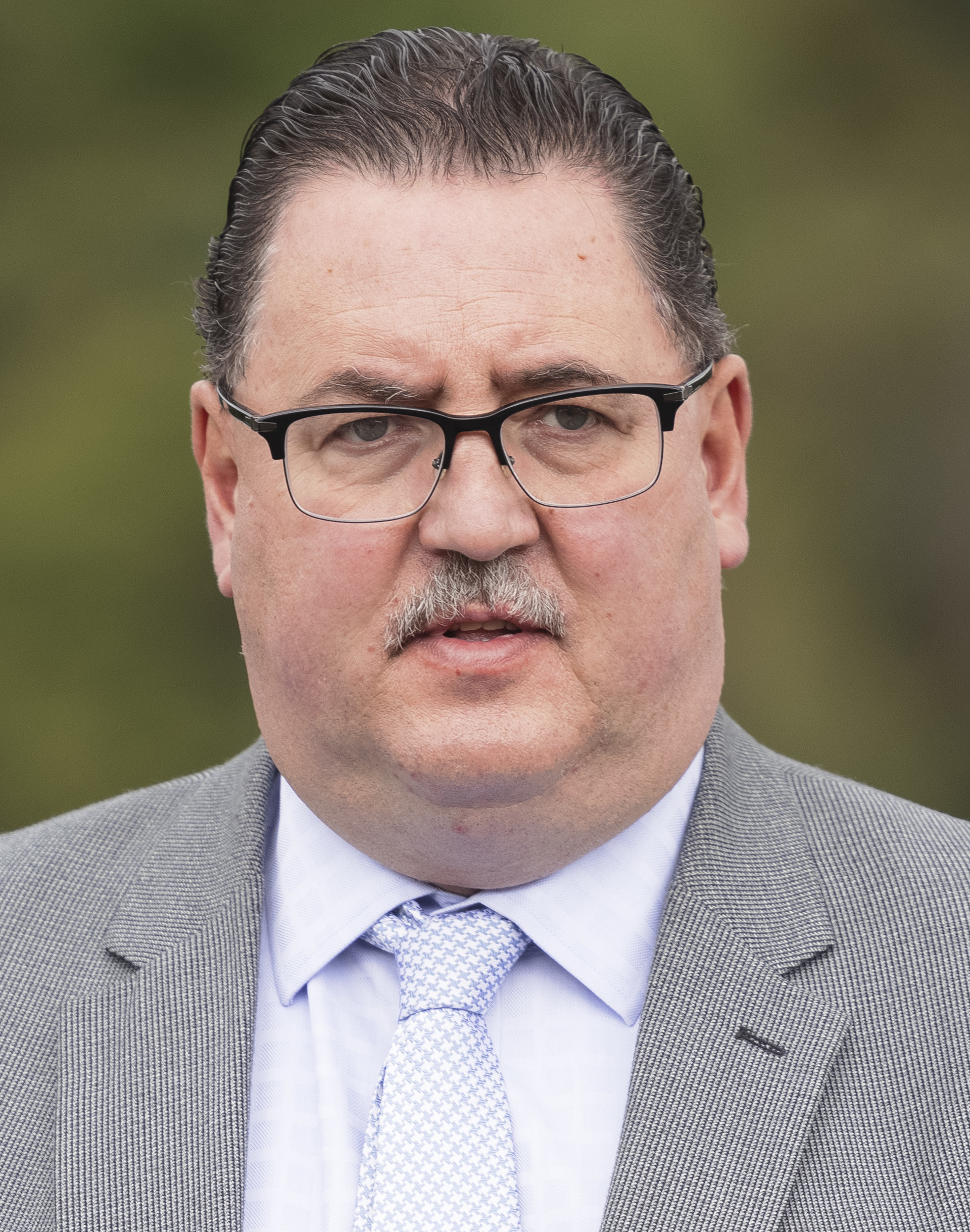

Member of the Pennsylvania House of Representatives from the 107th district
- In office January 4, 2011 – December 30, 2022
- Preceded by: Robert Belfanti
- Succeeded by: Joanne Stehr

Personal details
- Born: 1965 (age 60–61) Sunbury, Pennsylvania
- Party: Republican
- Spouse: Divorced
- Children: 1

Kurt A. Masser is a politician from the U.S. commonwealth of Pennsylvania. A member of the Republican Party, he was a member of the Pennsylvania House of Representatives for the 107th district. Masser served as the Majority Caucus Administrator. He sat on the Rules Committee and the Committee on Committees.

He is also a former Northumberland County Commissioner.
