= Valley View, Schuylkill County, Pennsylvania =

Unincorporated community in Pennsylvania, US

Valley View
- Census-designated place
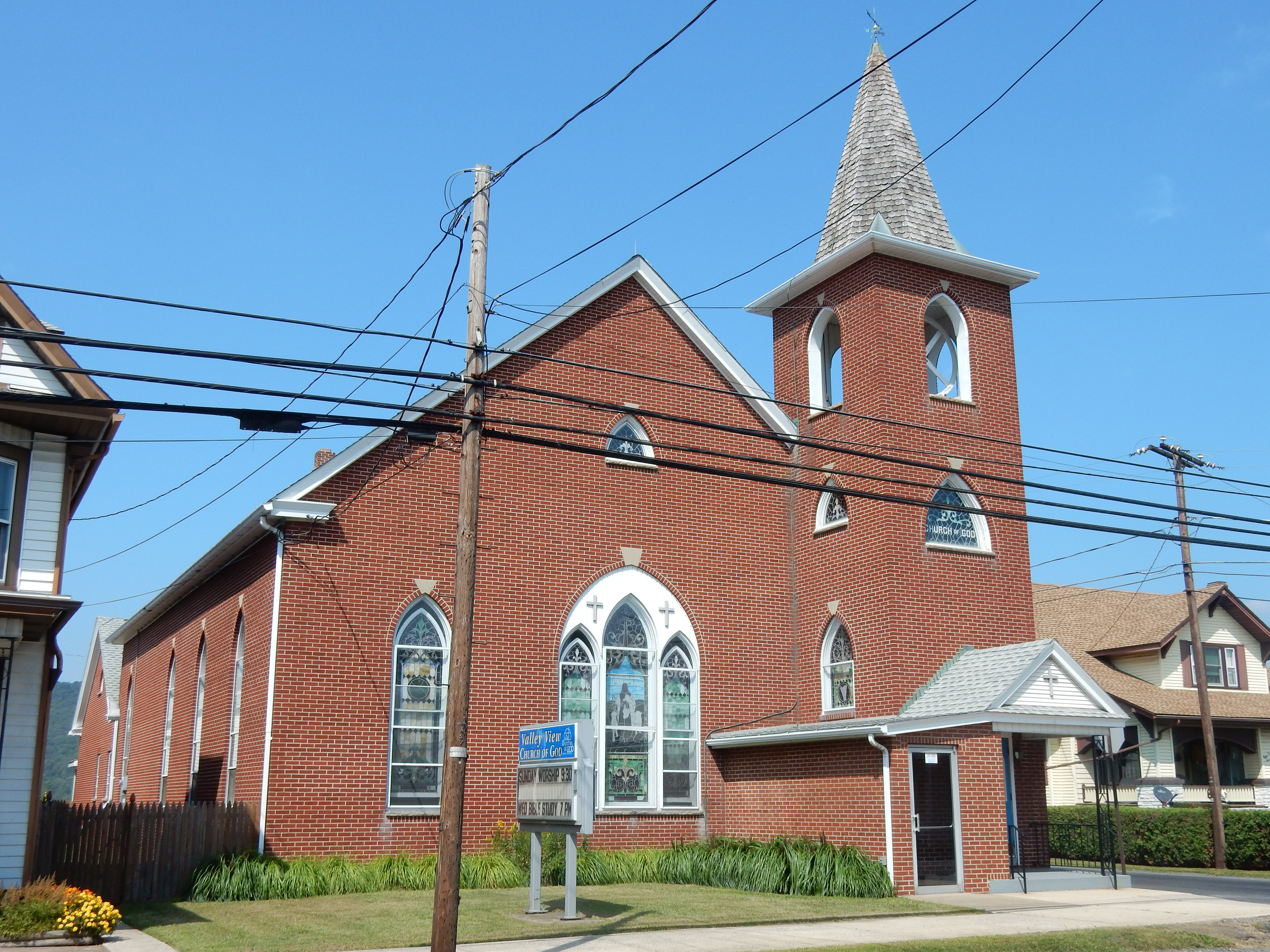
- Church of God in Valley View.

- Location within the state of Pennsylvania Valley View (the United States)
- Coordinates: 40°38′42″N 76°32′17″W
- Country: United States
- State: Pennsylvania
- County: Schuylkill

Area
  - Total: 3.3 sq mi (8.5 km^{2})
  - Land: 3.3 sq mi (8.5 km^{2})

Population (2000)
  - Total: 1,677
  - Density: 510/sq mi (200/km^{2})
- Time zone: UTC-5 (Eastern (EST))
  - Summer (DST): UTC-4 (EDT)
- ZIP code: 17983
- Area code: 570

Valley View is a census-designated place (CDP) in Hegins Township, Pennsylvania, United States. The population was 1,677 at the 2000 census.

== Geography ==
Valley View is located at 40°38′42″N 76°32′17″W (40.645118, -76.538053).

According to the United States Census Bureau, the CDP has a total area of 3.3 square miles (8.5 km^{2}), all land.

== Demographics ==
At the 2000 census there were 1,677 people, 713 households, and 491 families living in the CDP. The population density was 512.3 inhabitants per square mile (197.8/km^{2}). There were 756 housing units at an average density of 230.9 per square mile (89.2/km^{2}). The racial makeup of the CDP was 98.63% White, 0.12% African American, 0.30% Asian, 0.12% Pacific Islander, 0.48% from other races, and 0.36% from two or more races. Hispanic or Latino of any race were 0.83%.

Of the 713 households 25.5% had children under the age of 18 living with them, 59.0% were married couples living together, 6.2% had a female householder with no husband present, and 31.0% were non-families. 27.1% of households were one person and 16.7% were one person aged 65 or older. The average household size was 2.35 and the average family size was 2.83.

The age distribution was 19.3% under the age of 18, 8.5% from 18 to 24, 25.6% from 25 to 44, 23.5% from 45 to 64, and 23.0% 65 or older. The median age was 43 years. For every 100 females, there were 94.3 males. For every 100 females age 18 and over, there were 92.2 males.

The median household income was $37,838 and the median family income was $43,558. Males had a median income of $30,071 versus $26,161 for females. The per capita income for the CDP was $17,817. About 1.2% of families and 4.1% of the population were below the poverty line, including 3.9% of those under age 18 and 8.4% of those age 65 or over.

== Education ==
The school district is Tri-Valley School District.

== Gallery ==
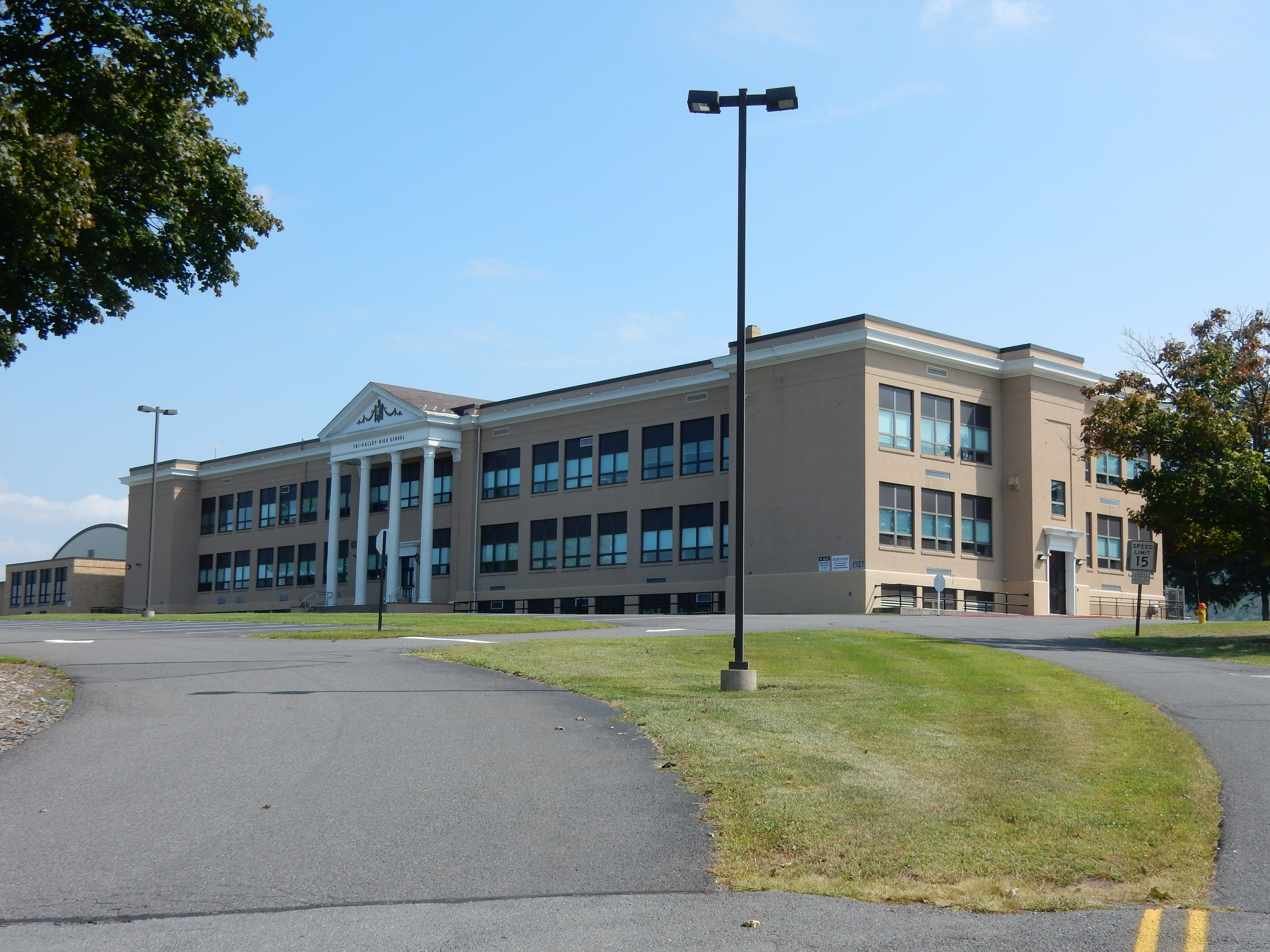
Tri-Valley High School.

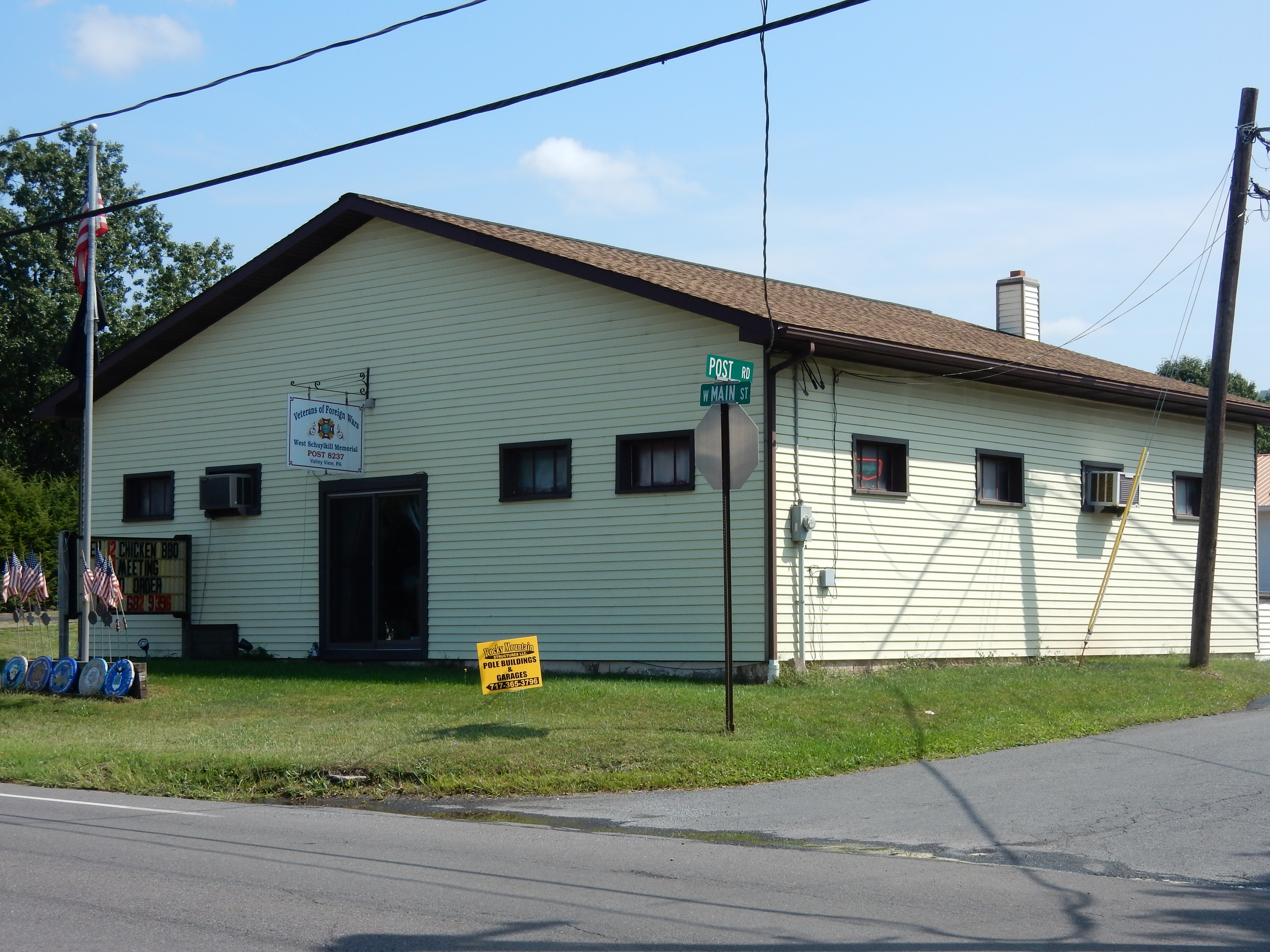
VFW Post in Valley View.

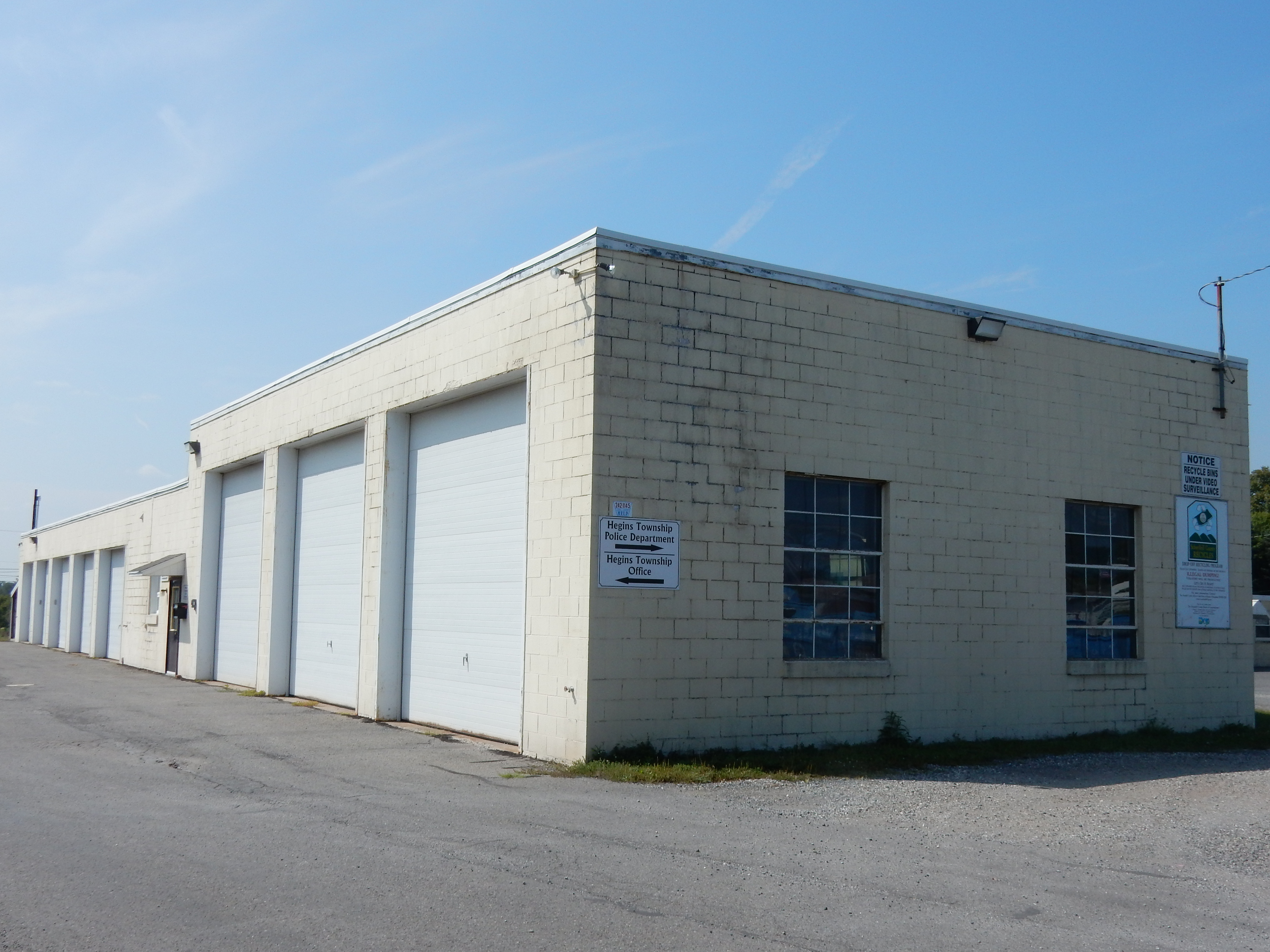
Hegins Township Municipal Bldg.
