= Hegins Township, Pennsylvania =

Township in Pennsylvania, US

Coordinates: 40°37′00″N 76°32′59″W

- Township
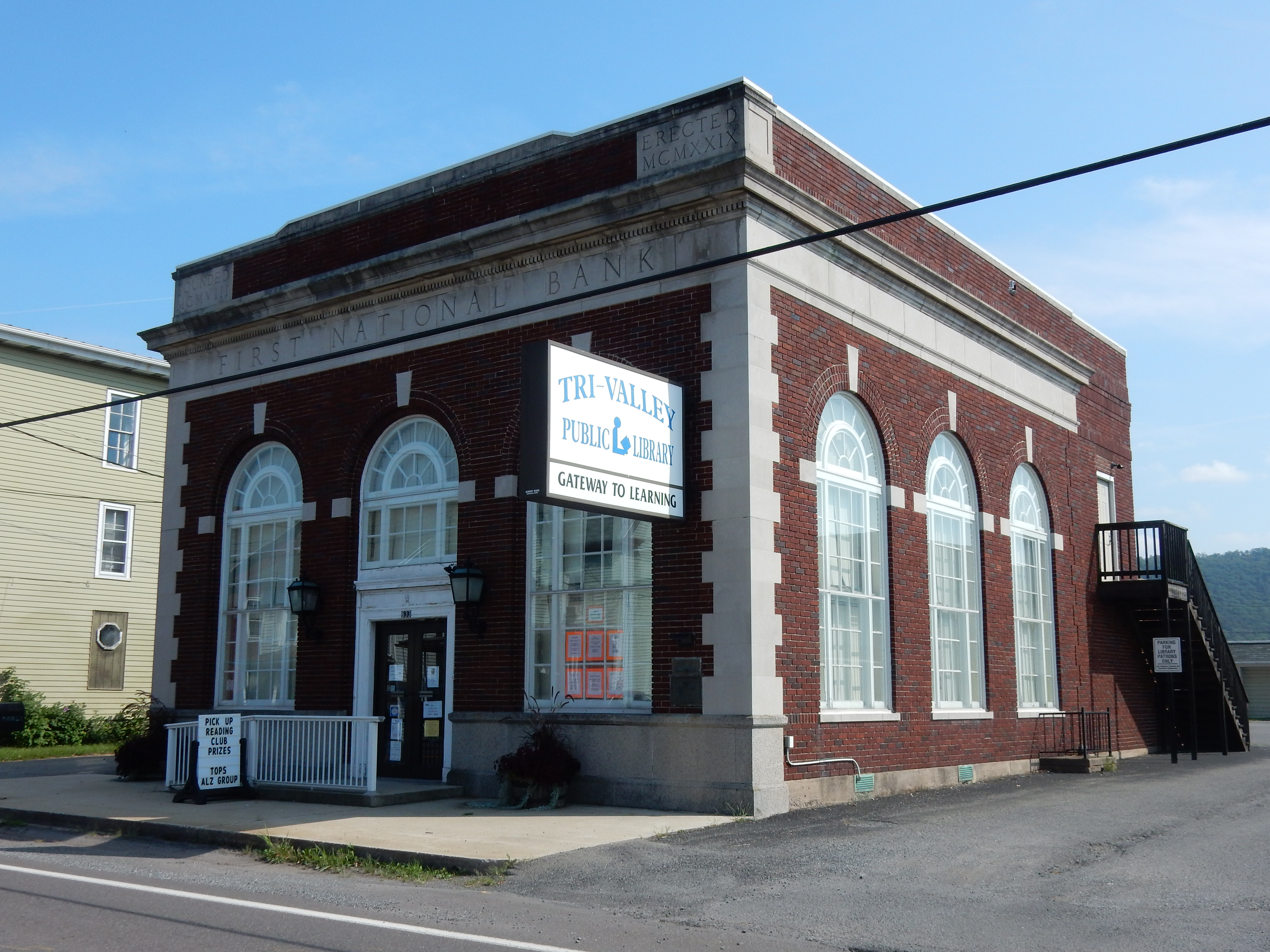
- Tri-Valley Public Library in Hegins.

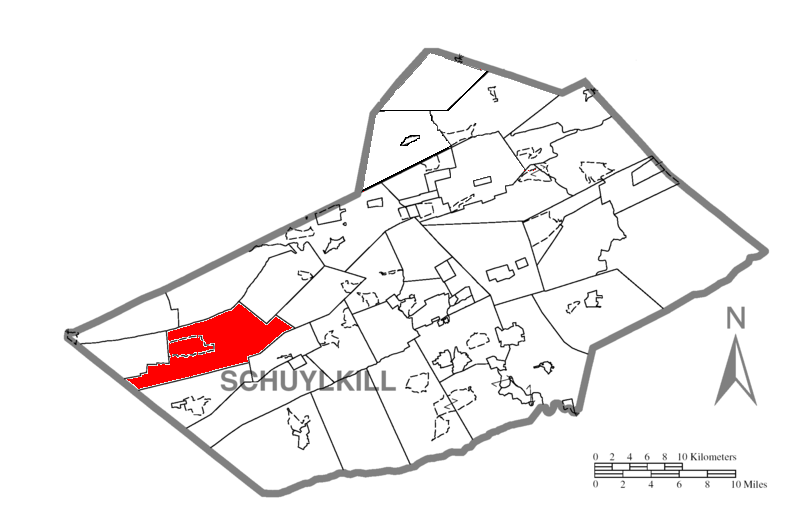
- Map of Schuylkill County, Pennsylvania Highlighting Hegins Township

- Map of Schuylkill County, Pennsylvania
- Country: United States
- State: Pennsylvania
- County: Schuylkill
- Settled: 1775
- Incorporated: 1853

Area
  - Total: 31.92 sq mi (82.67 km^{2})
  - Land: 31.92 sq mi (82.66 km^{2})
  - Water: 0.0039 sq mi (0.01 km^{2})

Population (2020)
  - Total: 3,341 ▼
  - Estimate (2023): 3,347
  - Density: 108.1/sq mi (41.75/km^{2})
- Time zone: UTC-5 (Eastern (EST))
  - Summer (DST): UTC-4 (EDT)
- FIPS code: 42-107-33584
- Website: https://heginstwp.com/

Hegins Township (pronounced Higgins) is a township in Schuylkill County, Pennsylvania, United States. The population was 3,341 at the 2020 census.

== Geography ==
According to the United States Census Bureau, the township has a total area of 32.0 square miles (83 km^{2}), all land. It contains the census-designated places of Hegins and Valley View.

== Demographics ==
Historical population
Census	Pop.	Note	%±
2010	3,516		—
2020	3,347		−4.8%
2023 (est.)	3,347		0.0%
U.S. Decennial Census

At the 2000 census there were 3,519 people, 1,447 households, and 1,021 families living in the township. The population density was 109.9 inhabitants per square mile (42.4/km^{2}). There were 1,540 housing units at an average density of 48.1 per square mile (18.6/km^{2}). The racial makeup of the township was 99.01% White, 0.09% African American, 0.23% Asian, 0.06% Pacific Islander, 0.34% from other races, and 0.28% from two or more races. Hispanic or Latino of any race were 0.57%.

Of the 1,447 households 28.2% had children under the age of 18 living with them, 60.7% were married couples living together, 6.2% had a female householder with no husband present, and 29.4% were non-families. 25.9% of households were one person and 15.5% were one person aged 65 or older. The average household size was 2.43 and the average family size was 2.91.

The age distribution was 21.3% under the age of 18, 7.9% from 18 to 24, 27.0% from 25 to 44, 23.8% from 45 to 64, and 19.9% 65 or older. The median age was 41 years. For every 100 females, there were 98.6 males. For every 100 females age 18 and over, there were 96.0 males.

The median household income was $36,091 and the median family income was $43,207. Males had a median income of $30,673 versus $24,704 for females. The per capita income for the township was $17,571. About 3.0% of families and 6.3% of the population were below the poverty line, including 11.9% of those under age 18 and 7.5% of those age 65 or over.

== Gallery ==
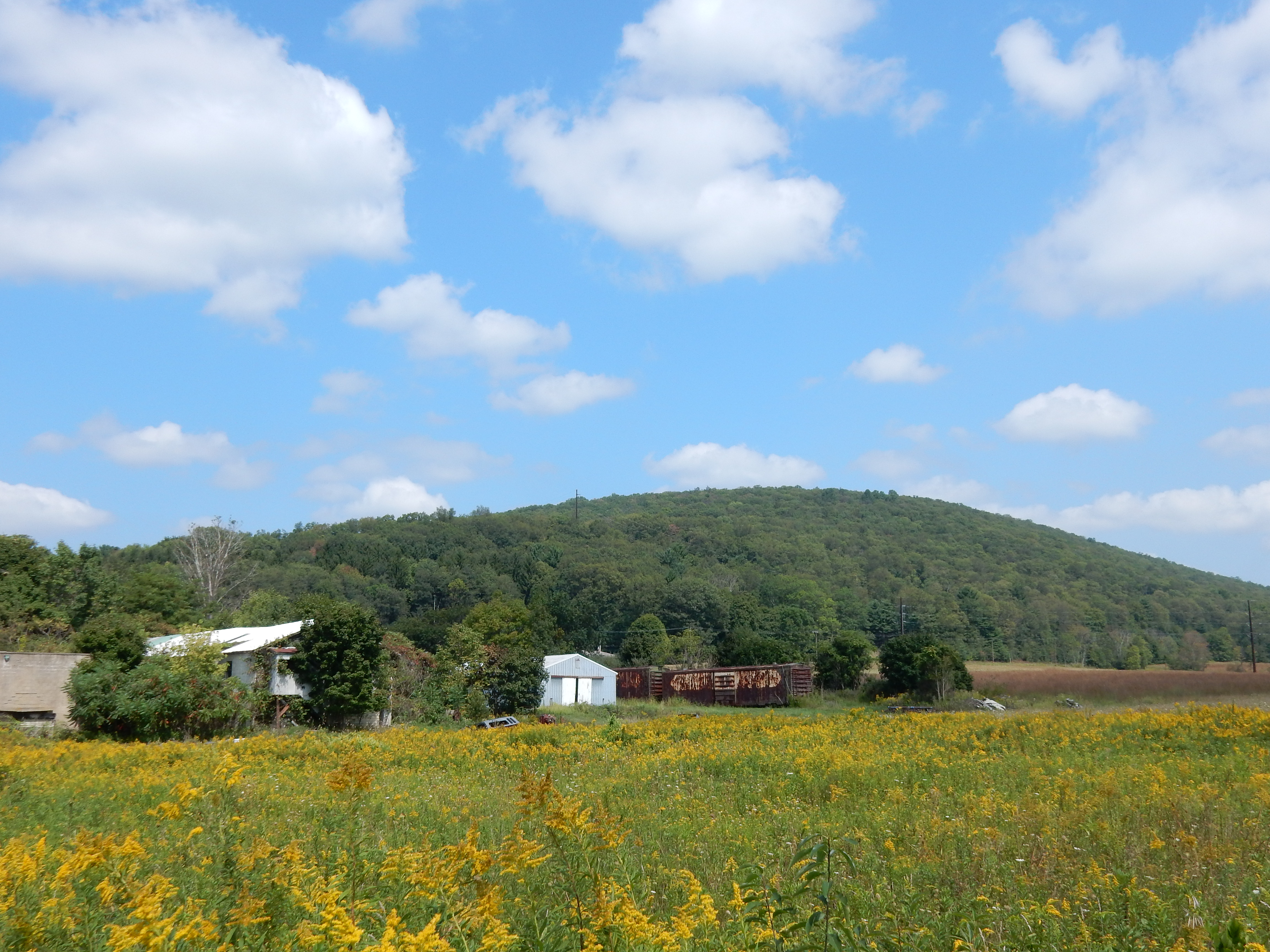
Village of Fountain.

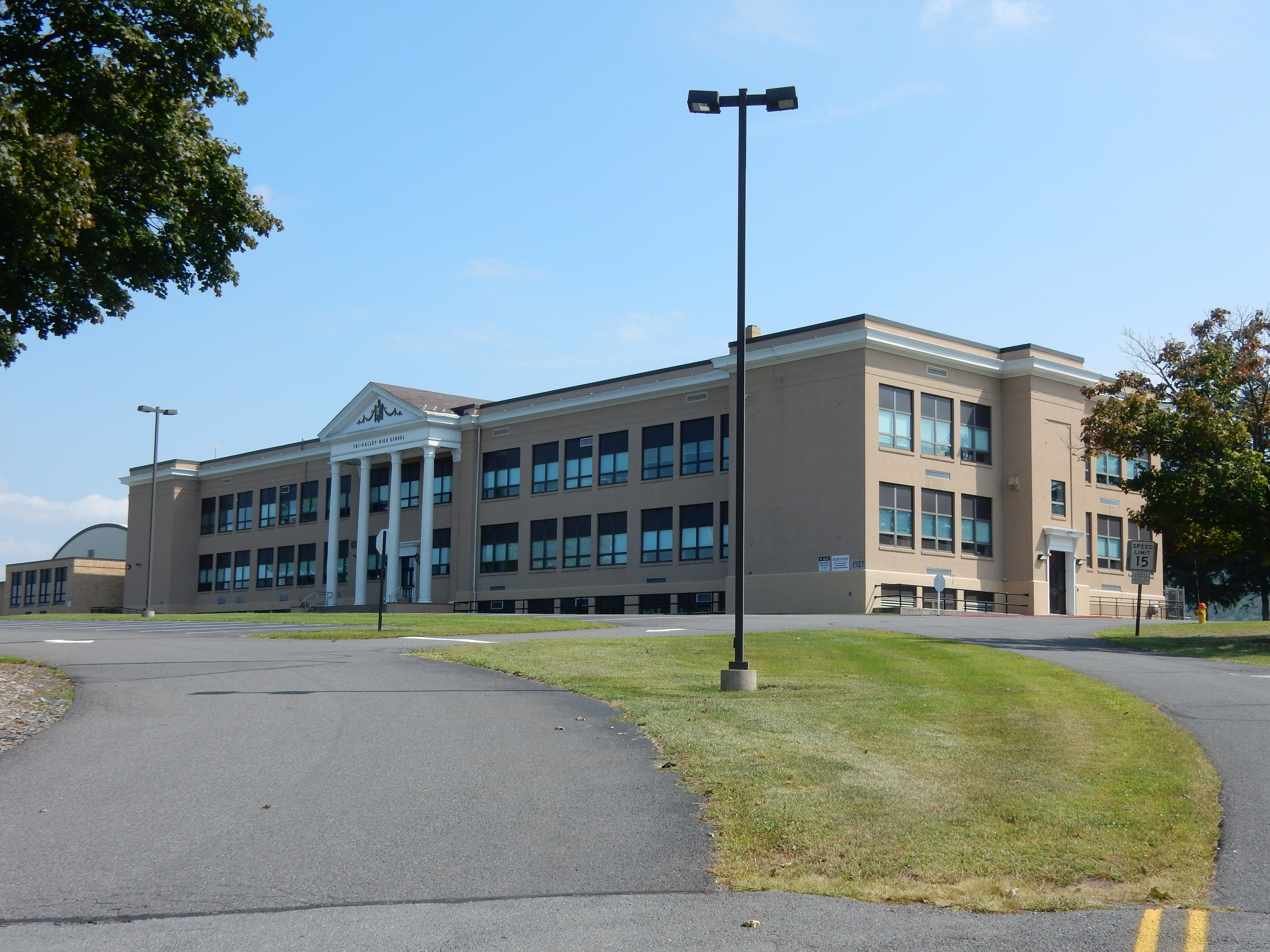
Tri-Valley High School in Hegins.

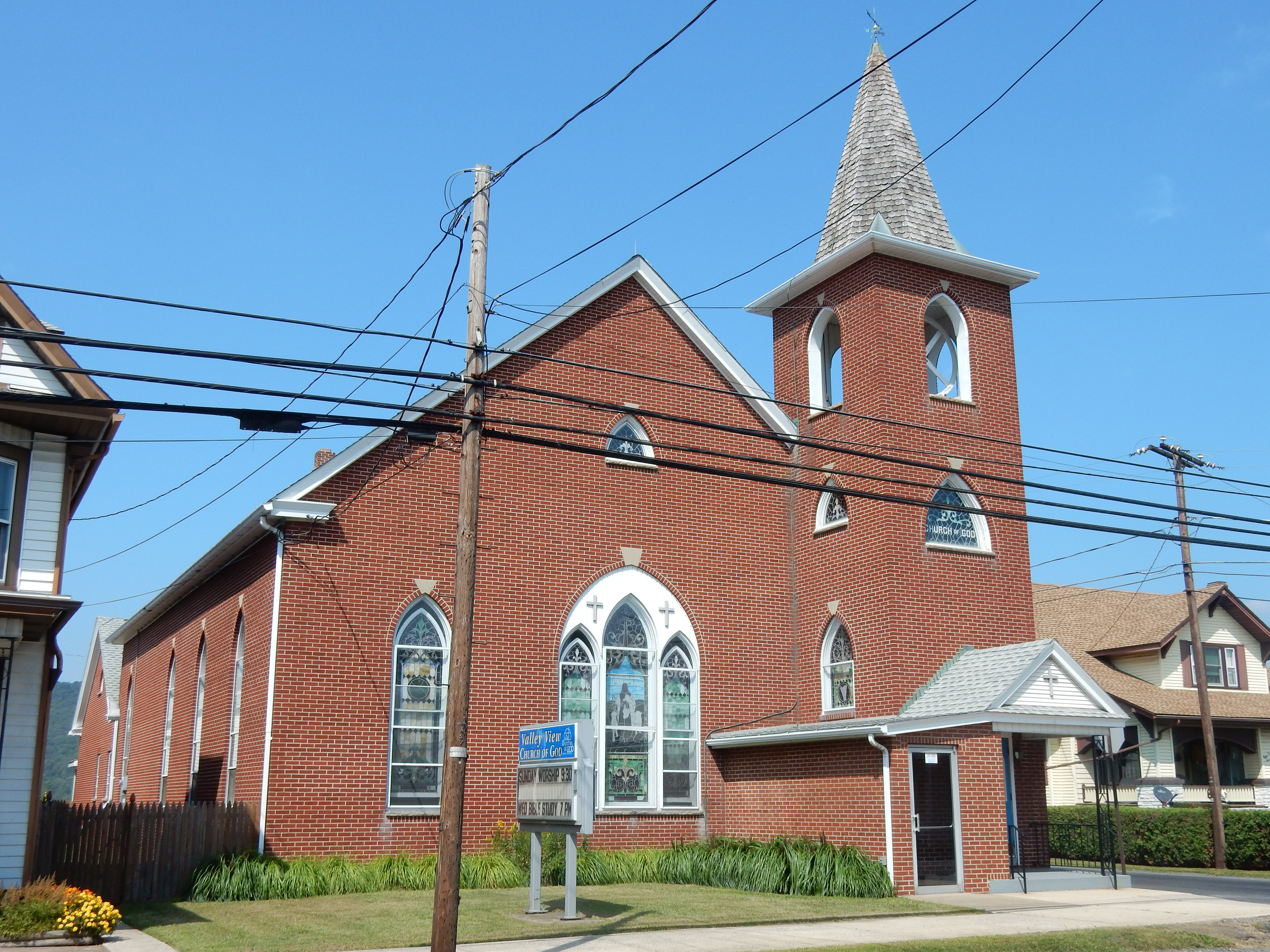
Church of God in Valley View.
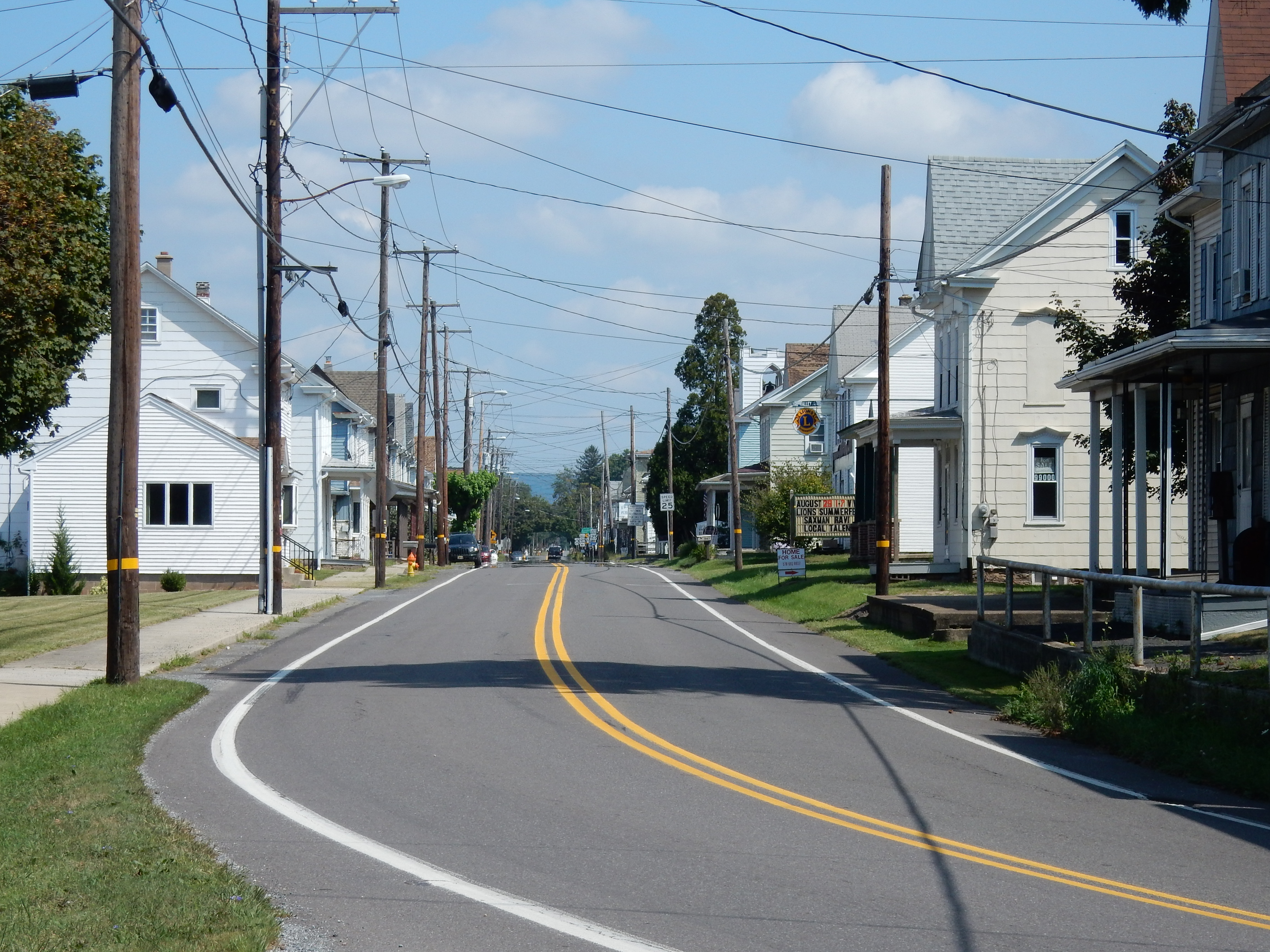
Main Street in Hegins.

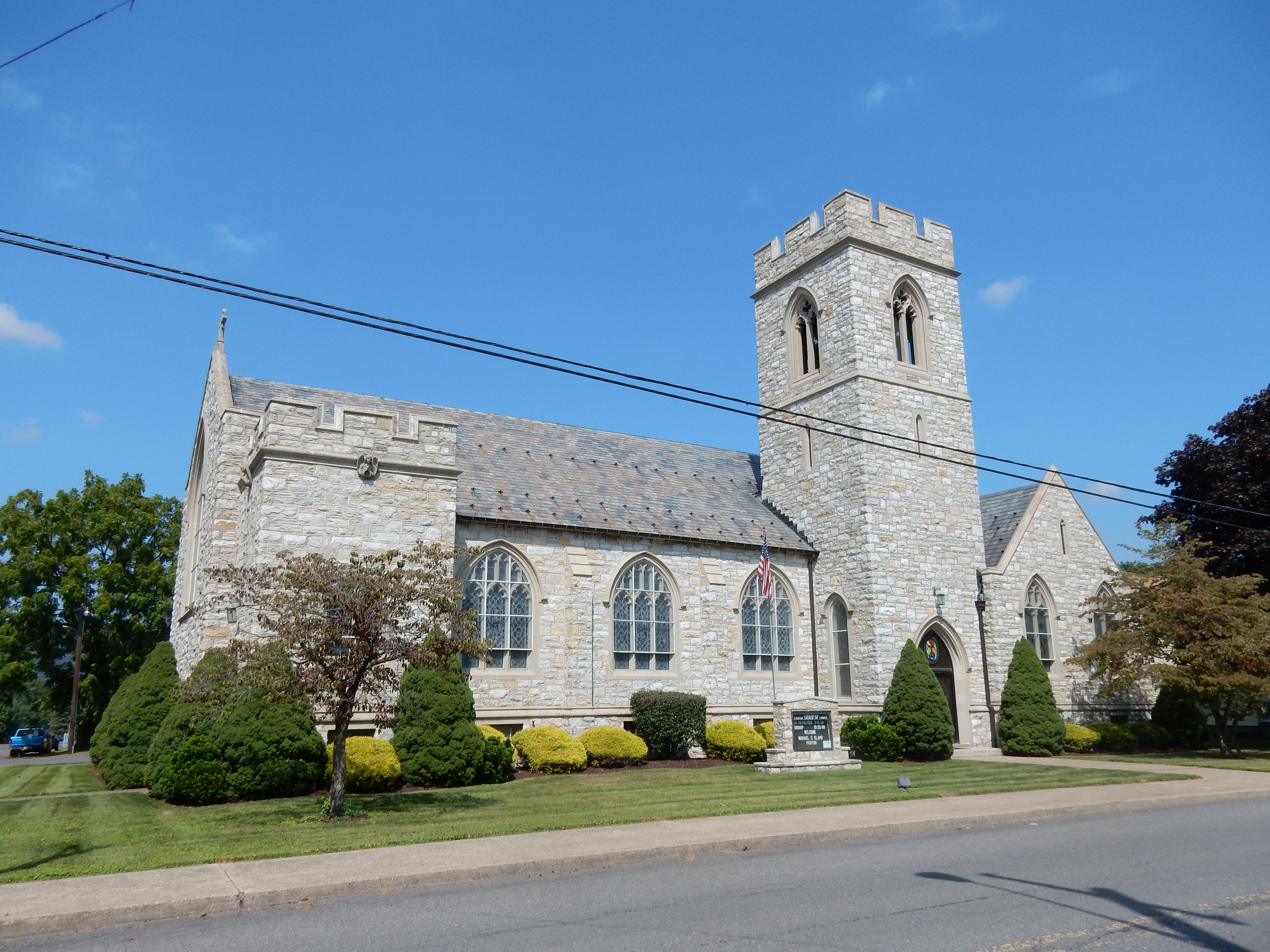
Friedens UCC in Hegins.

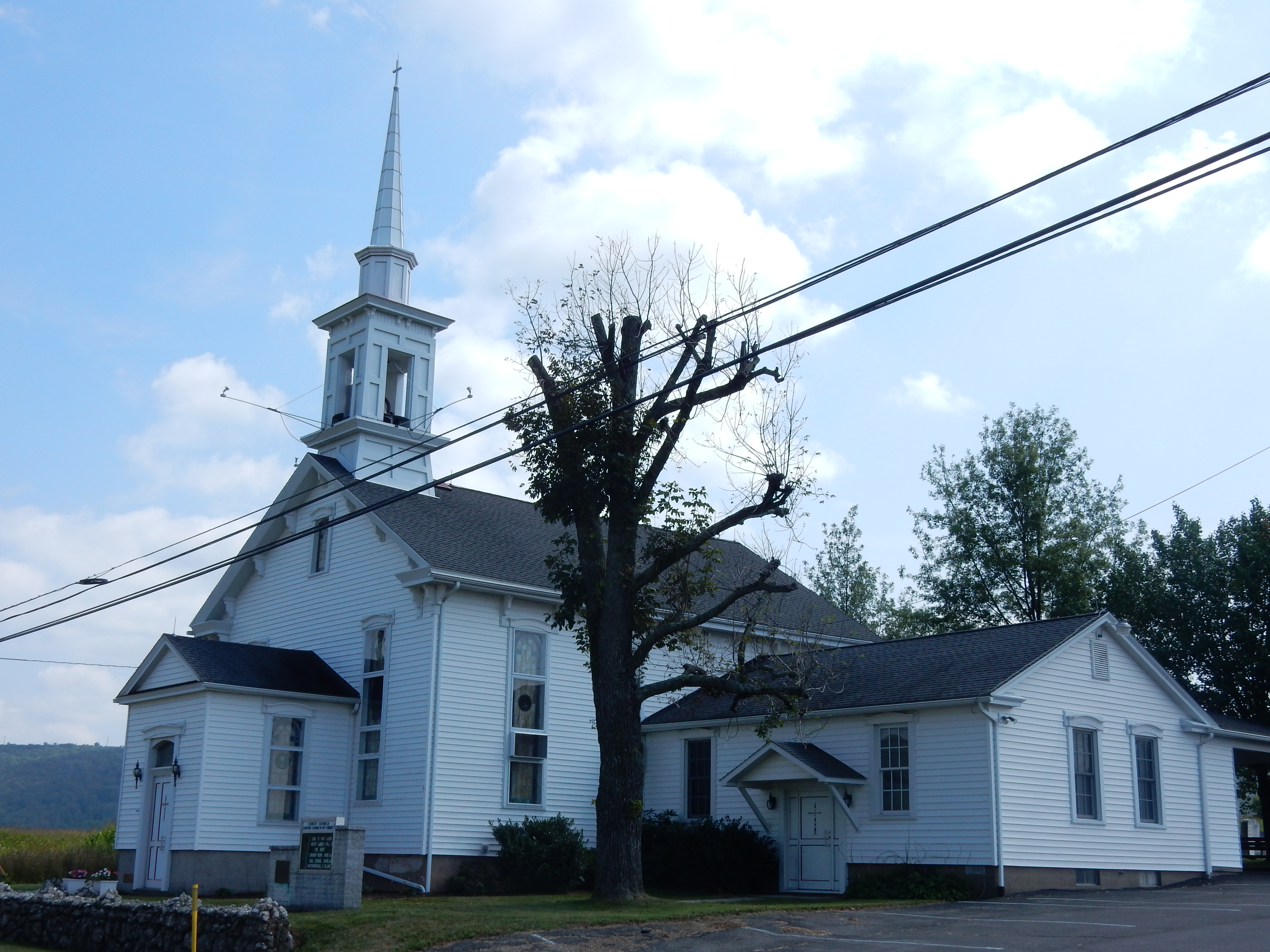
Christ Church UCC in Fountain.

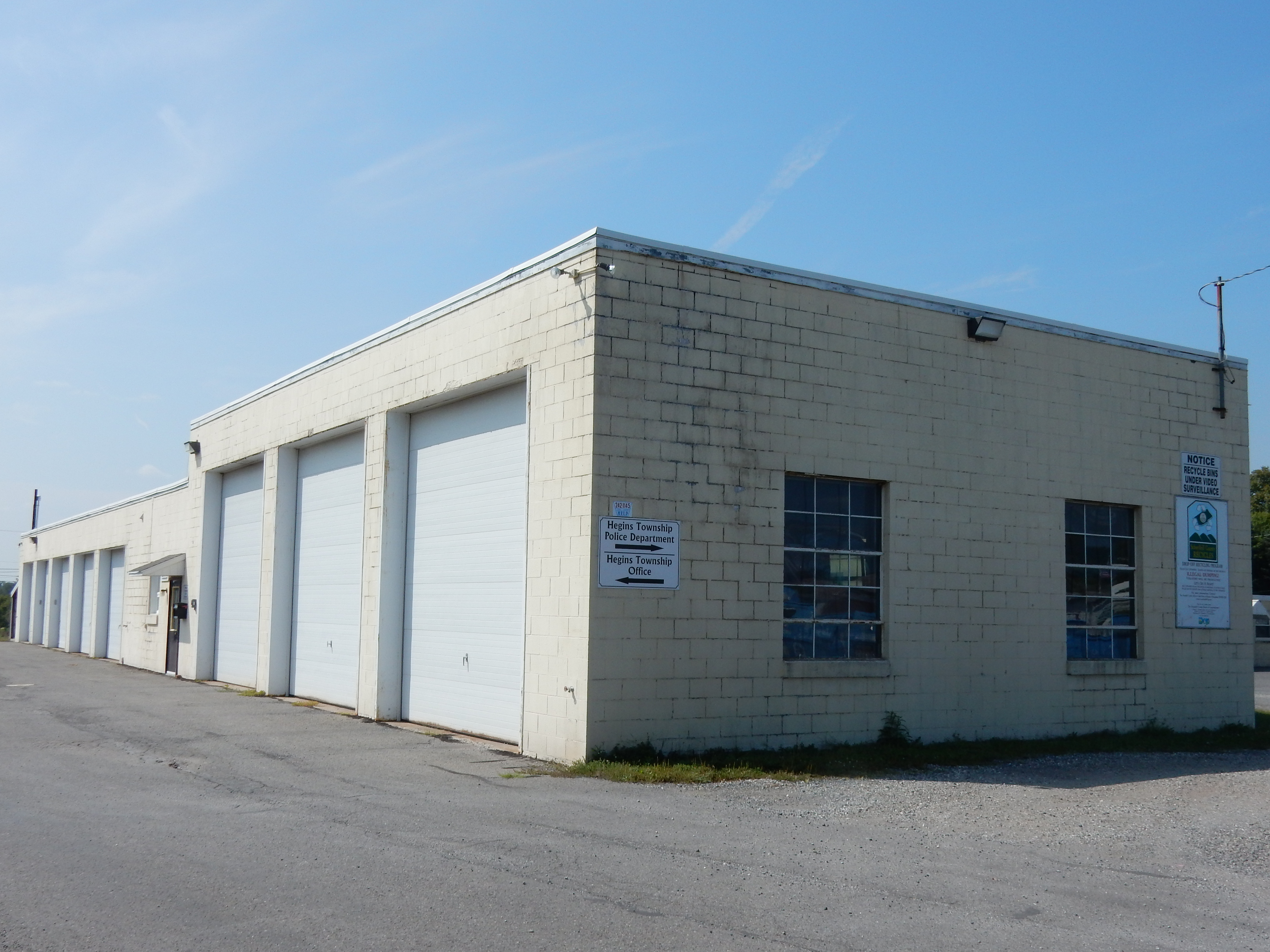
Hegins Township Municipal Bldg.
